= Kalamandalam Sindhu =

Indian classical dancer

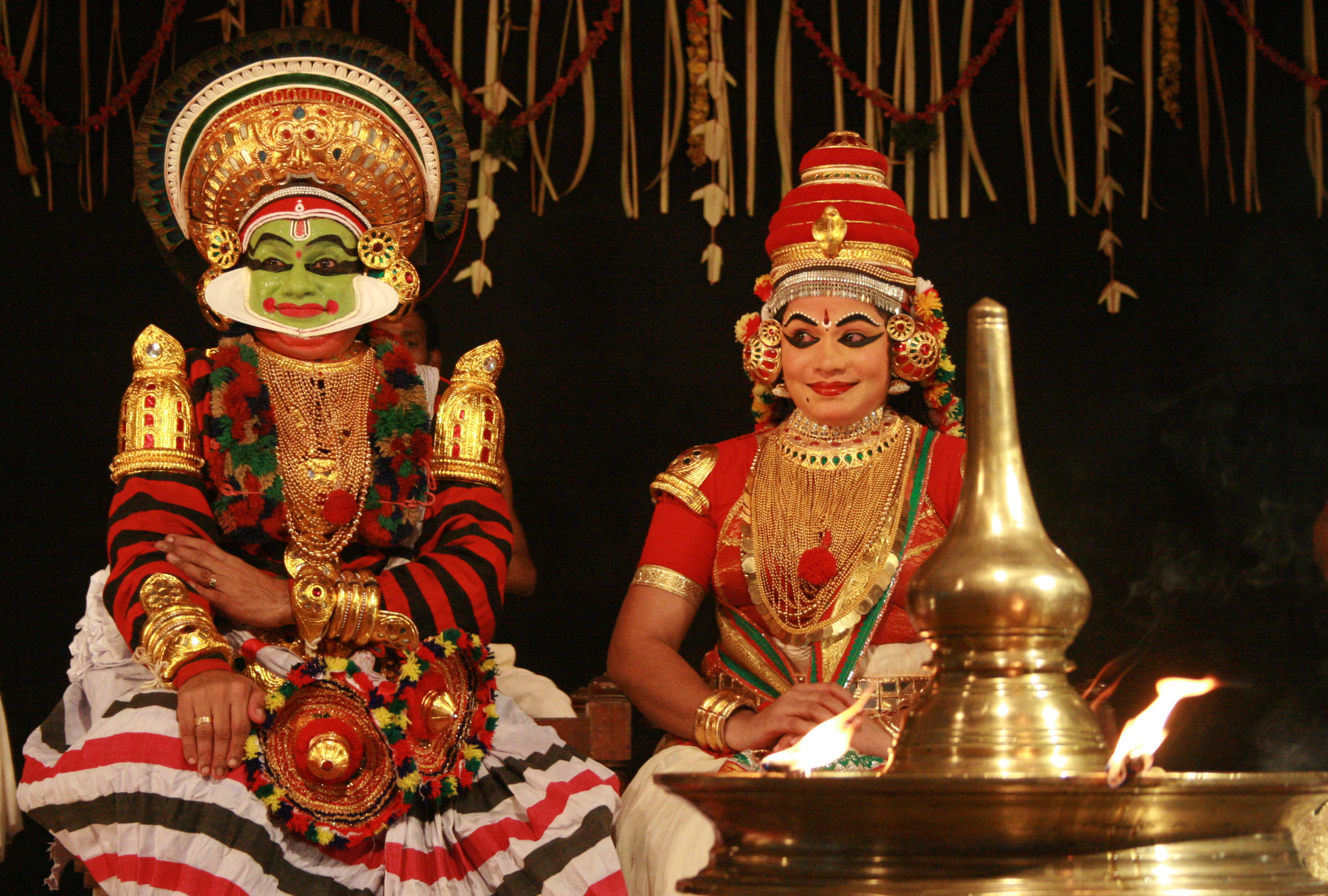
- Kalamandalam Sindhu (right side) performing Koodiyattam
- Born: Sindhu; 1977 (age 48–49); Thrissur, Kerala
- Occupation: Koodiyattam-Nangiar koothu dancer
- Awards: Kerala Sangeetha Nataka Akademi Award

Kalamandalam Sindhu (born 1977) is an Indian Koodiyattam-Nangiar koothu artist from Kerala. An ICCR empaneled artiste, she is the recipient of Kerala Sangeetha Nataka Akademi Award in 2019.

== Biography ==
Sindhu was born in Thrissur district as the daughter of Mukundan Nair and Parukutty Amma. She joined Kalamandalam in 1992 at the age of fifteen and got training under Kalamandalam Ramachakyar, Kalamandalam Sivan Namboothiri, Kalamandalam Girija and Kalamandalam Shailaja. Sindhu obtained a scholarship from the Ministry of Human Resource Development and trained for two years under Usha Nangyar. She has also played the lead role in the play Punarjani of Niriksha theater, Thiruvananthapuram.

After working at Kalamandalam for a year, she then worked at the Painkulam Ramu Chakyar Memorial Kalapeeth for a year. Later she worked at the Mani Madhava Chakyar Memorial Gurukulam. Sindhu has performed Koodiyattam-Nangyarkuth in France, Germany, Holland, Russia, Siberia, Japan and Singapore and has also performed in Russia on the invitation of UNESCO. In 2020, she won the for Kerala Sangeetha Nataka Akademi Award for Nangiyarkoothu. She has also won the Bhagavatar Kunjunnithampuran Award, Thiruvananthapuram Swaralaya Award, Thrissur Doctor T. I Radhakrishnan Foundation Award and Sri Ramakrishna Ashramam Award.
