= Kerala Sangeetha Nataka Akademi Award =

Award given by the Kerala Sangeetha Nataka Akademi Award

- Award for contributions to Performing arts
- Awarded for: Award for performing arts in Kerala
- Sponsored by: Kerala Sangeetha Nataka Akademi
- First award: 1962
- Final award: 2022

Kerala Sangeetha Nataka Akademi Award is an award given by the Kerala Sangeetha Nataka Akademi, an autonomous organisation for the encouragement, preservation, and documentation of the performing arts of Kerala. Instituted by the Department of Cultural Affairs of the Government of Kerala in 1962, the awards are given in the categories of music, dance, theatre, other traditional arts, and for contribution/scholarship in performing arts. The award consists of Rs. 30,000, a citation and a plaque. The recipients are also conferred the title Kalasree.

== List of recipients ==
The recipients of the Kerala Sangeetha Nataka Akademi Award in various categories of performing arts have been listed below:

=== Classical Music ===
- 1962 – M. A. Kalyanakrishna Bhagavathar
- 1962 – K. S. Narayanaswamy (Veena)
- 1964 – Ambalapuzha Sankaranarayana Panicker
- 1964 – Ambalapuzha Gopalakrishna Panicker
- 1966 – M. D. Ramanathan
- 1969 – Kottaram Sankunny Nair (Harmonium)
- 1971 – Palghat K. V. Narayanaswamy
- 1971 – Mavelikkara Krishnankutty Nair (Mridangam)
- 1972 – C. S. Krishna Iyer
- 1972 – Parur Sundaram Iyer (Violin)
- 1972 – Thiruvizha Raghavan Pillai (Nadaswaram)
- 1973 – Vaikom Vasudevan Nair
- 1973 – Chunangad Appu Iyer (Mridangam)
- 1974 – Puthucode Krishnamoorthy
- 1975 – Kaviyoor C. K. Revamma
- 1976 – Cherthala Gopalan Nair
- 1976 – Chittoor Sankara Panicker (Nadaswaram)
- 1977 – Parassala B. Ponnammal
- 1978 – L. P. R. Varma
- 1979 – K. R. Kedaranathan
- 1981 – Neyyattinkara Vasudevan
- 1981 – Mavelikkara Velukkutty Nair (Mridangam)
- 1982 – Trivandrum R. Venkataraman (Veena)
- 1982 – Kamala Kailasanathan
- 1982 – Mavelikkara Sankarankutty Nair (Mridangam)
- 1983 – P. Leela
- 1983 – M. K. Kalyana Krishna Bhagavathar (Veena)
- 1983 – T. V. Gopalakrishnan (Mridangam)
- 1983 – P. K. Sankaran (Nadaswaram)
- 1985 – Mavelikkara Prabhakara Varma
- 1985 – Mavelikkara S. R. Raju (Mridangam)
- 1986 – Vechoor Harihara Subramania Iyer
- 1987 – Trichur V. Ramachandran
- 1988 – V. V. Subrahmanyam (Violin)
- 1989 – Mangad K. Natesan
- 1990 – Renuka Girijan
- 1991 – K. G. Jayan
- 1992 – Palkulangara Ambika Devi
- 1992 – Tripunithura G. Narayana Swamy (Mridangam)
- 1993 – P. R. Kumara Kerala Varma
- 1993 – Rajeswari Menon (Veena)
- 1994 – A. K. Raveendranath
- 1994 – S. Hariharan Nair
- 1995 – Trivandrum R. Krishnaswamy
- 1995 – Puthukode S. Krishna (Mridangam)
- 1996 – Pala C. K. Ramachandran
- 1996 – Aranmula Govindankutty (Thakil)
- 1996 – Malabar Sukumaran Bhagavathar
- 1997 – K. Omanakutty (Vocal)
- 1997 – Tripunithura N. Radhakrishnan (Ghatam)
- 1997 – Pappukutty Bhagavathar
- 1998 – Neyyattinkara Mohanachandran (Vocal)
- 1998 – T. S. Babu (Violin)
- 1998 – Trivandrum V. Surendran (Mridangam)
- 1999 – K. S. Gopalakrishnan (Pullamkuzhal)
- 1999 – Tripunithura Lalitha (Vocal)
- 2000 – Sukumari Narendra Menon (Vocal)
- 2000 – Parassala Ravi (Mridangam)
- 2000 – Nedumangad Sivanandan (Violin)
- 2000 – Ambilikuttan (Vocal)
- 2001 – Gopalan Nair (Ganjira)
- 2001 – Vettikavala K. N. Sasikumar (Nadaswaram)
- 2002 – Ananthalakshmi Venkitaraman (Vocal)
- 2002 – Aryanad G. Sadasivan (Vocal)
- 2002 – V. Balakrishnan Potty (Veena)
- 2003 – N. P. Ramaswami (Vocal)
- 2003 – Mathangi Sathyamoorthy (Vocal)
- 2003 – T. V. Ramani (Violin)
- 2004 – Leelamani Radhakrishnan (Vocal)
- 2004 – Thiruvizha Sivanandan (Violin)
- 2004 – S. Sai Babu (Violin)
- 2004 – K. R. Anto (Flute)
- 2004 – Cherthala N. Sreekumar Varma (Mridangam)
- 2005 – Malini Hariharan (Vocal)
- 2005 – A. Ananthapadmanabhan (Veena)
- 2005 – Guruvayur Dwari (Mridangam)
- 2005 – Trichur P. Govindankutty (Nadaswaram)
- 2006 – G. Seethalakshmi Ammal (Vocal)
- 2006 – Pazhayannur K. G. Krishnankutty (Nadaswaram)
- 2006 – Trichur C. Rajendran (Violin)
- 2006 – Alappuzha Chandrasekharan Nair (Thalavadyam)
- 2007 – Chalakudy N. S. Balakrishnan
- 2007 – Varkala C. S. Jayaram
- 2007 – Thuravoor R. Narayana Panicker (Nadaswaram)
- 2007 – N. Hari (Mridangam)
- 2008 – Mukhathala Sivaji
- 2008 – T. M. Abdul Azeez (Violin)
- 2008 – Neyyattinkara Krishnan (Mukharsangh)
- 2008 – Kalyani Menon
- 2009 – Ayamkudi Mani
- 2009 – T. H. Subramaniam (Violin)
- 2009 – R. Karuna Moorthy (Thakil)
- 2009 – Palakkad K. Jayakrishnan (Mridangam)
- 2010 – Shertallay K. N. Renganatha Sharma (Vocal)
- 2010 – K. V. Prasad (Mridangam)
- 2010 – T. H. Lalitha (Violin)
- 2011 – Kavalam Sreekumar
- 2011 – Ramesh Narayan
- 2011 – Orumanayoor O. K. Gopi (Nadaswaram)
- 2012 – Trivandrum Krishnakumar
- 2012 – Binni Krishnakumar
- 2012 – Vanaja Sankar
- 2013 – Sreevalsan J. Menon
- 2013 – M. K. Sankaran Namboothiri
- 2013 – Kuzhalmannam G. Ramakrishnan (Mridangam)
- 2013 – Adichanallur Anilkumar (Ghatam)
- 2014 – P. Unnikrishnan (Carnatic Music)
- 2014 – Paul Poovathingal (Carnatic Music)
- 2014 – Attukal Balasubramaniam (Violin)
- 2014 – G. Babu (Mridangam)
- 2015 – Mavelikkara P. Subramaniam
- 2015 – S. R. Mahadeva Sarma (Violin)
- 2015 – S. R. Rajasree (Violin)
- 2015 – Nanjil A. R. Arul (Mridangam)
- 2016 – V. V. Ravi (Violin)
- 2016 – Trivandrum R. Vaidhyanathan (Mridangam)
- 2016 – Adoor P. Sudarsanan (Carnatic Music)
- 2017 – M. Narmadha (Violin)
- 2017 – Cherthala R Jayadevan (Mridangam)
- 2017 – Thamarakkad Govindan Namboothiri (Carnatic Music)
- 2018 – Arakkal Nandakumar (Music)
- 2018 – Retnasree Iyer (Tabla)
- 2019 – Nemmara N. R. Kannan (Nadaswaram)
- 2019 – Anayadi Prasad (Music)
- 2020 – K. Venkitaraman (Vocal)
- 2020 – Babu Narayanan (Violin)
- 2020 – Premkumar Vadakara (Music Direction)
- 2021 – Kollam V. Sajikumar (Vocal)
- 2021 – N. P. Prabhakaran (Music)
- 2022 – Palakkad Sreeram (Classical Music)
- 2022 – Thiruvizha Viju S. Anand (Violin)
- 2022 – Alappuzha S. Vijayakumar (Thavil)
- 2022 – Prakash Ulleri (Harmonium/Keyboard)
- 2023 – Nisa Azeezi (Music & Music Direction)
- 2023 – Sharreth (Music Direction)
- 2023 – Sampath Narayanan (Violin)

=== Drama ===
- 1962 – Mavelikkara Ponnamma
- 1966 – Sebastian Kunjukunju Bhagavathar
- 1969 – Artist P. J. Cherian
- 1969 – N. N. Pillai
- 1971 – Kodungallur Ammini Amma
- 1972 – Swami Brahmavruthan
- 1973 – N. Krishna Pillai
- 1973 – Oachira P. K. Sankarankutty Nair
- 1974 – Pariyanampatta Divakaran
- 1974 – C. K. Rajam
- 1975 – T. R. Sukumaran Nair
- 1975 – K. P. A. C. Sulochana
- 1976 – K. V. Neelakantan Nair (Green Room)
- 1976 – Vijayakumari
- 1977 – Kunjandi
- 1977 – Omana
- 1978 – Kalaikkal Kumaran
- 1978 – Kozhikode Santha Devi
- 1978 – Artist Kesavan (Rangasilpam)
- 1979 – Thoppil Krishna Pillai
- 1979 – Chachappan
- 1980 – Vasu Pradeep
- 1980 – Mavelikkara Kamalamma
- 1981 – K. M. Raghavan Nambiar
- 1981 – M. S. Namboothiri
- 1981 – Sudharma
- 1982 – Vaikom Mani
- 1982 – N. S. Ittan
- 1982 – O. Madhavan
- 1982 – T. P. Gopalan
- 1982 – Adoor Bhavani
- 1983 – Jagathy N. K. Achary
- 1983 – Nellimoodu K. Ramakrishna Pillai (Green Room)
- 1985 – V. T. Vikraman Nair
- 1986 – K. G. Sethunath
- 1987 – D. K. Chellappan
- 1989 – Changanassery Natarajan
- 1990 – Vakkom Shakeer
- 1991 – Pappukutty Bhagavathar
- 1991 – William D'Cruz
- 1991 – S. L. Puram Sadanandan
- 1991 – P. N. Nanappan
- 1992 – Sreemoolanagaram Mohan
- 1993 – P. R. Chandran
- 1993 – T. M. Abraham
- 1994 – Kadavoor G. Chandran Pillai
- 1994 – Madavoor Bhasi
- 1994 – Trichur Elsi
- 1995 – P. K. Venukuttan Nair
- 1995 – Ibrahim Vengara
- 1996 – P. K. Raghavan
- 1996 – K. G. Devaki Amma
- 1997 – K. Thayat
- 1997 – Maya Narayanan
- 1997 – Saithan Joseph
- 1998 – T. V. Gopinath (Direction)
- 1998 – N. G. Panicker
- 1999 – K. M. Dharman (Direction)
- 1999 – K. P. A. C. Rajamma (Actress)
- 2000 – K. K. Jacob
- 2000 – N. Somasundaram
- 2001 – K. S. Namboothiri (Script)
- 2002 – Nilambur Ayisha
- 2002 – Vayala Vasudevan Pillai
- 2002 – P. V. Kuriakose (Script)
- 2003 – A. A. Chandrahasan
- 2003 – V. Chandransekharan Vaidyar
- 2004 – Paravur George
- 2004 – K. P. A. C. Sunny
- 2004 – Krishnakumari
- 2005 – M. S. Warrier
- 2005 – Ammini Ernest
- 2005 – Nelson Fernandez (Script, Direction)
- 2006 – Sreedharan Nileshwaram
- 2006 – Leela Panicker
- 2006 – Karivellur Murali (Script)
- 2007 – Haridas Cherukunnu
- 2007 – V. R. Santha
- 2008 – C. L. Jose (Script)
- 2008 – Karakulam Chandran (Direction)
- 2008 – P. Balachandran (Script)
- 2008 – Sreekala V. K.
- 2009 – P. Gangadharan (Direction)
- 2009 – Savithri Sreedharan (Actress)
- 2009 – Sathish Sangamithra (Actor, Direction)
- 2009 – G. Gopalakrishnan (Script)
- 2010 – Geetha Salam
- 2010 – Jayaraj Warrier (Drama, Caricature)
- 2010 – K. P. Gopalan (Direction)
- 2010 – A. E. Ashraf (Light)
- 2011 – Meenambalam Santhosh
- 2011 – Deepan Sivaraman
- 2011 – K. G. Ramu (Make-up)
- 2012 – Adv. Manilal (Script)
- 2012 – Abhilash Pillai (Director)
- 2012 – Pattanam Rasheed (Make-up)
- 2013 – Ramesh Varma (Direction)
- 2013 – Rajan Kizhakkanela (Script)
- 2014 – Prof. Aliyar V. Kunju
- 2014 – Manu Jose
- 2014 – R. Sudhakaran
- 2014 – Shibu S. Kottaram
- 2015 – Sherly Somasundharam (Children's Drama)
- 2015 – Geetha Rangaprabhath (Children's Drama)
- 2015 – Francis T. Mavelikkara
- 2015 – Girish Sopanam
- 2015 – Sreekanth
- 2015 – Jose Koshy (Lighting)
- 2015 – Pradeep Thalayal (Sound arrangement)
- 2016 – Kozhikode Sarada (Actress)
- 2016 – A. Santha Kumar (Script, Direction)
- 2016 – C. K. Sasi (Script)
- 2017 – Jayaprakash Karyal
- 2017 – Kannur Vasutti
- 2017 – Pradeep Roy
- 2017 – Sandhya Rajendran
- 2018 – K. R. Ramesh
- 2018 – P. J. Unnikrishnan
- 2018 – Sasikumar Souparnika
- 2018 – M. V. Sherly
- 2019 – John Fernadaz
- 2019 – Narippatta Raju
- 2019 – K. P. Suveeran
- 2019 – Saheerali
- 2019 – Sajitha Madathil
- 2020 – Rajani Meloor
- 2020 – E. A. Rajendran
- 2020 – Pradeep Malavika
- 2020 – Sureshbabu T.
- 2020 – Gopalan Adat
- 2020 – C. N. Sreevalsan
- 2021 – Mangalan K. P. A. C. (Actor)
- 2021 – Maniyappan Aranmula
- 2021 – Babu Pallassery (Script, Direction, Actor)
- 2021 – A. N. Murugan (Actor)
- 2021 – Rajmohan Neeleswaram (Script, Direction)
- 2021 – Sudhi Nireeksha (Actress, Direction)
- 2022 – Valsan Nisari
- 2022 – Babu Annur
- 2022 – Suresh Babu Sreestha
- 2022 – Lenin Edakochi
- 2022 – Rajitha Madhu
- 2022 – Kottakkal Murali

=== Kathakali ===
- 1962 – Chenganoor Raman Pillai
- 1964 – Kurichi Kunjan Panicker
- 1964 – Manjeri Sankunni Nair (Madhalam)
- 1969 – Champakulam Pachu Pillai
- 1969 – Kalamandalam Krishnan Nair
- 1969 – Kudamaloor Karunakaran Nair
- 1971 – Kalamandalam Neelakantan Nambisan
- 1971 – Kalamandalam Krishnankutty Poduval (Chenda)
- 1972 – Guru Gopala Panicker
- 1973 – Kadathanattu Kochu Govindan Asan
- 1973 – Kottakkal Kuttan Marar (Chenda)
- 1973 – Kalamandalam Appukutty Poduval (Madhalam)
- 1974 – Kavungal Sankarankutty Panicker
- 1976 – Keezhpadam Kumaran Nair
- 1977 – Cherthala Kuttappa Kurup (Music)
- 1978 – Pallippuram Gopalan Nair
- 1979 – Kottakkal Vasu Nedungadi (Music)
- 1980 – Kalamandalam Govinda Warrier (Make-up)
- 1981 – Thakazhi Kuttan Pillai (Music)
- 1981 – Chalakudy Narayanan Nambeesan (Madhalam)
- 1982 – K. P. Ramakrishna Panicker (Make-up)
- 1982 – Kalamandalam Achunni Poduval (Chenda)
- 1983 – Mekkara Narayanan Nair
- 1985 – Kalamandalam Ramankutty Nair
- 1985 – Chandra Mannadiyar (Chenda)
- 1986 – Oyoor Kochugovinda Pillai
- 1987 – Kana Kannan Nair
- 1988 – Kannan Pattali
- 1989 – Mankompu Sivasankara Pillai
- 1991 – Guru Krishnankutty
- 1991 – Kalamandalam Padmanabhan Nair
- 1992 – Guru Kelu Nair
- 1993 – Cherthala Thankappa Panicker
- 1994 – Chandramana Govindan Namboothiri
- 1995 – Kalamandalam Gopi
- 1996 – Kottakkal Sivaraman
- 1997 – Kalamandalam Kesavan (Melam)
- 1998 – Kalamandalam Gangadharan (Music)
- 1999 – Nelliyode Vasudevan Namboodiri (Vesham)
- 2000 – Kottakkal Krishnankutty Nair (Vesham)
- 2001 – Pandalam Kerala Varma
- 2001 – Sadanam Sreedharan (Madhalam)
- 2001 – Varanasi Madhavan Namboothiri (Chenda)
- 2002 – Sadanam Krishnankutty (Vesham)
- 2003 – Kalamandalam Vasu Pisharody
- 2003 – Thonnakkal Peethambaran
- 2005 – Mudakkal Gopinathan Nair (Music)
- 2006 – Kalamandalam K. G. Vasudevan Nair (Vesham)
- 2009 – Kottakal Nandakumaran Nair (Vesham)
- 2009 – Kalanilayam Unnikrishnan (Music)
- 2010 – FACT Padmanabhan (Vesham)
- 2010 – Madambi Subramanian Namboodiri (Music)
- 2010 – Kalamandalam Narayanan Nair (Madhalam)
- 2010 – Mathoor Govindan Kutty (Vesham)
- 2011 – Inchakkattu Ramachandran Pillai
- 2011 – Sreenarayanapuram Appu Marar (Chenda)
- 2012 – Kalamandalam V. Subramanian
- 2014 – Sadanam K. Harikumaran
- 2015 – Kuroor Vasudevan Namboodiri (Chenda)
- 2016 – Kottakkal Chandrasekhara Warrier (Vesham)
- 2016 – Kottakkal Madhu (Music)
- 2017 – Kalamandalam Oyur Ramachandran
- 2018 – Kalamandalam C. M. Balasubramanian
- 2018 – Kalamandalam Unnikrishnan (Chenda)
- 2018 – Pathiyoor Sankarankutty (Music)
- 2019 – Kalamandalam Rajasekharan
- 2019 – Kalamandalam C. V. Sukumaran

=== Mohiniyattam ===
- 1972 – Chinnammu Amma
- 1974 – Kalamandalam Kalyanikutty Amma
- 1976 – Kalamandalam Satyabhama
- 1983 – Kalamandalam Ambika
- 1985 – Kalamandalam Sugandhi
- 1988 – Kalamandalam Sumathi
- 1990 – Kalamandalam Leelamma
- 1991 – Kalamandalam Vimala Menon
- 1993 – Kalamandalam Lakshmi
- 1997 – Kalamandalam Chandrika
- 1998 – Kala Vijayan
- 2003 – Nirmala Panicker
- 2004 – Kalamandalam Radhika
- 2005 – Shyamala Surendran
- 2006 – Deepti Omchery Bhalla
- 2007 – Neena Prasad
- 2008 – Gopika Varma
- 2008 – Pallavi Krishnan
- 2009 – Vinitha Nedungadi
- 2010 – Methil Devika
- 2011 – Sunanda Nair
- 2012 – Sreedevi Rajan
- 2013 – Vijayalakshmi
- 2014 – Smitha Rajan
- 2015 – Jayaprabha Menon
- 2016 – Kalamandalam Hymavathy
- 2017 – Kalamandalam Husnabhanu
- 2019 – Kalamandalam Rajalakshmi
- 2020 – Kavitha Krishnakumar
- 2021 – R. L. V. Ramakrishnan
- 2022 – Kalamandalam Sheeba Krishnakumar

=== Bharatanatyam ===
- 1975 – Kalamandalam Kshemavathy
- 1983 – Kalamandalam Saraswathy
- 1995 – Kalakshetra Vilasini
- 1996 – Kalamandalam Chandrika
- 2011 – Girija Chandran
- 2012 – Rajashree Warrier
- 2013 – Rama Vaidyanathan
- 2018 – Aswathy V. Nair
- 2019 – Uma Sathyanarayanan

=== Dance ===
- 1966 – Guru Gopinath
- 1973 – P. K.Poduval (Ottan Thullal)
- 1977 – Guru Chandrasekharan
- 1978 – Kottayam Chellappan
- 1979 – Chemancheri Kunhiraman Nair
- 1980 – Vechoor Thankamani Pillai (Ottamthullal)
- 1981 – Shadow Gopinath
- 1982 – Tripunithura Madhava Menon
- 1986 – Dancer Sankarankutty
- 1987 – P. K. Vijayabhanu
- 1987 – K. T. Kumaran Asan (Ottan Thullal)
- 1988 – A. K. Sivaram
- 1989 – Kalamandalam Gangadharan
- 1989 – Thiruvalla Ponnamma (Ottan Thullal)
- 1990 – Tripunithura Aravindaksha Menon
- 1991 – K. S. Divakaran Nair (Ottan Thullal)
- 1992 – Nattuvar Parameswara Menon
- 1993 – Saraswathy Malhotra
- 1994 – Bhavani Chellappan
- 1996 – Kalamandalam Prabhakaran (Ottan Thullal)
- 1997 – Kalamandalam Devaki (Ottan Thullal)
- 1998 – N. V. Krishnan
- 1998 – Evoor Damodaran Nair (Ottan Thullal)
- 1999 – Guru Gopalakrishnan
- 1999 – Kusumam Gopalakrishnan
- 1999 – Oachira P. R. Sankarankutty
- 2000 – Ennakkad Narayanankutty
- 2000 – Manorama Balakrishnan
- 2000 – Kalamandalam Geethanandan (Ottan Thullal)
- 2001 – V. Mydhili
- 2002 – Kalamandalam Vanaja
- 2005 – Kalanilayam Govindankutty
- 2008 – S. Lekha Thankachi (Kerala Natanam)
- 2013 – Kalamandalam Vasudevan (Ottan Thullal)
- 2014 – Manju Warrier (Kuchipudi)
- 2015 – Sreelakshmy Govardhanan (Kuchipudi)
- 2017 – Kalamandalam Mohanakrishnan (Ottan Thullal)
- 2018 – Gayathri Subramanian (Kerala Natanam)
- 2020 – Manalur Gopinath (Ottan Thullal)
- 2020 – Vinayachandran (Kerala Natanam)
- 2021 – Kalamandalam Sathyavrathan (Kerala Natanam)
- 2021 – Geetha Padmakumar (Kuchipudi)
- 2022 – Bijula Balakrishnan (Kuchipudi)
- 2022 – Kalamandalam Radhamani (Thullal)

=== Koothu–Koodiyattam ===
- 1964 – Ammannur Chachu Chakyar
- 1971 – Painkulam Narayana Chakyar
- 1972 – Painkulam Rama Chakyar
- 1979 – Subhadra Nangiyaramma
- 1981 – Irinjalakuda Narayanan Nambiar (Padakam)
- 1982 – Haripad Achuthadas (Padakam)
- 1983 – Ammannur Parameswara Chakyar
- 1985 – C. K. Krishnan Nambiar (Mizhavu)
- 1986 – Puthiyedath Mani Neelakanda Chakyar
- 1992 – K. K. Rajendran
- 1993 – P. K. Narayanan Nambiar (Mizhavu)
- 1998 – Kalamandalam Sivan Namboodiri (Koodiyattam)
- 2001 – Mani Damodara Chakyar (Chakyarkoothu)
- 2001 – P. K. G.Nambiar (Koodiyattam)
- 2001 – Kalamandalam Girija (Koodiyattam)
- 2002 – Margi Sathi (Koodiyattam)
- 2003 – Ammannur Parameswaran (Kuttan Chakyar) (Koodiyattam)
- 2005 – G. Venu
- 2006 – Painkulam Damodara Chakyar
- 2008 – Kalamandalam Rama Chakyar (Koodiyattam)
- 2009 – Painkulam Narayana Chakyar (Koodiyattam)
- 2011 – Margi Madhu
- 2013 – Mani Vasudeva Chakyar
- 2014 – Usha Nangiar
- 2014 – V. K. K. Hariharan (Koodiyattam)
- 2017 – Kalamandalam Kanakakumar (Koodiyattam)
- 2018 – Kalamandalam Shylaja (Koodiyattam, Nangiar koothu)
- 2019 – Kalamandalam Sindhu (Nangiar koothu)
- 2020 – Kalamandalam Jishnu Prathap (Koodiyattam)

=== Krishnanattam ===
- 1975 – A. Gopalan Nair
- 1977 – V. P. Narayana Pisharody
- 1983 – K. Velayudhan Nair
- 2012 – T. P. Aravinda Pisharody
- 2015 – K. Sukumaran

=== Keraleeya Vadyangal ===
- 1969 – Annamanada Achutha Marar (Panchavadyam)
- 1972 – Thiruvegappura Rama Marar
- 1974 – T. S. Ramaswamy Iyer (Chenda)
- 1979 – Chithali Rama Marar (Chenda)
- 1981 – Neetiyath Govindan Nair (Panchavadyam)
- 1983 – Annamanada Parameswara Marar (Timila)
- 1983 – Kadavallur Aravindakshan (Madhalam)
- 1983 – Pallavur Appu Marar (Idakka)
- 1986 – Kombath Kuttan Panicker (Kurumkuzhal)
- 1986 – Nireechan Kanjan Poojari (Thudi)
- 1987 – Chottanikkara Narayana Marar (Timila)
- 1988 – Kuzhur Kuttappa Marar (Panchavadyam)
- 1989 – Aliparambu Sivarama Poduval (Chenda)
- 1990 – Othikunnath Kuttykrishnan Nair (Kurumkuzhal)
- 1991 – Kuzhur Narayana Marar (Panchavadyam)
- 1995 – Pallavur Maniyan Marar (Timila)
- 1996 – Mattannoor Sankarankutty (Chenda - Thayambaka)
- 1997 – Thrippekulam Achutha Marar (Melam)
- 1999 – Thrithala Kunjikrishna Poduval (Thayambaka)
- 1999 – Edappal Appunni (Madhalam)
- 2000 – Chakkumkulam Appu Marar (Melam)
- 2001 – Cherpulassery Sivan (Madhalam)
- 2002 – M. Sankaranarayanan
- 2001 – Peruvanam Kuttan Marar (Chenda)
- 2003 – Kadanad V. K. Gopi (Mridangam)
- 2003 – Cherthala A. K. Ramachandran (Mridangam)
- 2004 – Chengamanad Appu Nair (Kombu)
- 2005 – Aliparambu Sivarama Poduval (Chenda, Idakka)
- 2006 – Margi Somadas (Chenda)
- 2007 – Kalamandalam Narayanan Nambisan (Madhalam)
- 2008 – Thrikkur Rajan (Panchavadyam - Madhalam)
- 2009 – Kalpathy Balakrishnan (Thayambaka)
- 2010 – Machad Ramakrishnan Nair (Kombu)
- 2010 – Cheruthazham Chandran (Thayambaka)
- 2011 – Kelath Aravindaksha Marar (Chenda)
- 2012 – Kalanilayam Babu (Madhalam)
- 2012 – Elanjimel P. Susheel Kumar (Mridangam)
- 2012 – Kelath Kuttappan Marar (Timila)
- 2013 – Kallekulangara Achuthankutty Marar (Thayambaka)
- 2014 – E. P. Vijayan Marar (Vadya Kala)
- 2015 – Malamary Sasi (Drums)
- 2016 – Kottakkal Ravi (Madhalam)
- 2016 – Kalamandalam Krishnadas (Chenda)
- 2017 – Peruvanam Satheesan Marar (Chenda)
- 2017 – Kunissery Chandran (Madhalam)
- 2017 – Kongad Madhu (Timila)
- 2018 – Machad Manikandan (Kombu)
- 2018 – Porur Unnikrishnan (Thayambaka)
- 2018 – Kariyannur Narayanan Namboodiri (Timila)
- 2019 – Velappaya Nandanan (Kurumkuzhal)
- 2019 – Thichur Mohanan (Idakka)
- 2020 – Peringode Chandran (Timila)
- 2021 – P. C. Chandra Bose (Instrumental Music)
- 2021 – Peringode Subramanyan (Idakka)
- 2021 – Pazhuvil Reghu Marar (Melam)
- 2021 – Thamarakudi R. Rajasekharan (Mukharsangh)
- 2022 – Kalamandalam Rajeev (Mizhavu)

=== Sopana Sangeetham ===
- 1981 – Njeralattu Rama Poduval (Sopana Sangeetham)
- 1985 – Mankombu Viswanatha Kurup (Ashtapathi)
- 1993 – Janardhanan Nedungadi (Sopana Sangeetham)
- 2016 – Njeralathu Harigovindan (Sopana Sangeetham)

=== Light Music ===
- 1982 – Thoppil Anto
- 1983 – M. S. Baburaj (Posthumous)
- 1983 – Kamukara Purushothaman
- 1985 – Thrissur P. Radhakrishnan
- 1986 – K. P. Udhayabhanu
- 1987 – Santha P. Nair
- 1990 – P. Gokulapalan
- 1992 – M. K. Arjunan
- 1993 – A. P. Gopalan
- 1994 – Perumbavoor G. Raveendranath
- 1995 – M. G. Radhakrishnan
- 1996 – Kanhangad Ramachandran
- 1997 – M. S. Naseem
- 1997 – Sara Gul Mohammed (Special Award)
- 1998 – C. O. Anto (Overall contribution)
- 1998 – Amachal Ravi
- 1998 – Kalavoor Balan (Music Direction)
- 1999 – A. K. Sukumaran
- 1999 – P. K. Medini (Janakeeya Sangeetham)
- 2000 – Kumarakom Rajappan
- 2000 – Dharman Ezhome
- 2000 – Kallara Gopan
- 2001 – Jerry Amaldev
- 2002 – K. P. Brahmanandan
- 2003 – Vadakara Krishnadas
- 2003 – Darsan Raman
- 2004 – Vidyadharan
- 2004 – Ayiroor Sadasivan
- 2005 – Zero Babu
- 2005 – Sibella Sadanandan
- 2006 – K. P. A. C. Chandrasekharan
- 2006 – Poovachal Khader (Lyrics)
- 2007 – V. T. Murali
- 2007 – Haripad K. P. N. Pillai (Direction)
- 2008 – Latha Raju
- 2008 – Cheravally Sasi (Lyrics)
- 2009 – Murali Sithara
- 2009 – B. Arundhathi
- 2010 – Tripunithura Girija Varma
- 2011 – Selma George
- 2011 – Poochakkal Shahul Hameed (Lyrics)
- 2012 – Alleppey Vivekanandan (Direction)
- 2012 – Rajeev Alunkal
- 2013 – R. K. Damodaran
- 2013 – Vaikom Vijayalakshmi
- 2014 – Kottayam K. Veeramani
- 2014 – M. D. Rajendran
- 2015 – S. Ramesan Nair
- 2016 – Chengannur Sreekumar
- 2017 – Vijayan Poonjar
- 2019 – R. K. Ramadas
- 2020 – Raana Murali
- 2020 – Natesh Shankar
- 2021 – Manju Menon
- 2022 – Vijayan Kovoor
- 2022 – N. Lathika

=== Keraleeya Kalakal ===
- 1969 – Chandu Peruvannan (Theyyam)
- 1974 – Chirukanda Panicker (Poorakkali)
- 1975 – Kannan Peruvannan (Theyyam)
- 1976 – Pazhoor Kunjan Marar (Mudiyett)
- 1977 – Kadammanitta Raman Nair (Padayani)
- 1978 – Ahmed Musaliar (Duffmuttu)
- 1979 – Palanthoni Velayudhan Asan (Porattu Natakam)
- 1980 – Madathil Sivasankan Nair (Kanyarkali)
- 1981 – Kunjambu Panicker Karivellur (Poorakkali)
- 1981 – Athiyadam P. P. Kanna Peruvannan (Theyyam)
- 1982 – P. K. Madhavan Pillai (Padayani)
- 1982 – P. P. Koru (Thirra)
- 1983 – A. V. Kunhirama Panicker (Theyyam)
- 1983 – Marangattil Thomman Lookka (Margamkali)
- 1985 – Guru Kalliassery Gopal Pillai (Padayani)
- 1986 – Kannan Perumalayan (Theyyam)
- 1987 – M. Krishna Panicker (Poorakkali)
- 1988 – P. P. Madhava Panicker (Poorakkali)
- 1988 – C. A. Aboobakkar (Mappilakalakal)
- 1989 – Kurichi P. S. Kumaran (Arjuna Nritham)
- 1990 – Nalakath Khasim (Mappilappattu)
- 1990 – Pallikulathil Chindan Peruvannan (Theyyam)
- 1991 – Rayarath Ummer (Oppana)
- 1992 – Valiyakath Kuttyali (Cheenimuttu)
- 1992 – Chummar Choondal (Natankala)
- 1992 – V. P. Damodara Panicker (Poorakkali)
- 1992 – V. P. Kannan Muthoodan (Theyyam)
- 1993 – Sheni Gopalakrishna Bhat (Yakshaganam)
- 1993 – C. K. Panicker (Theyyam)
- 1993 – T. V. Sankara Panicker (Poorakkali)
- 1993 – N. P. Abdul Gurukkal (Kolkali)
- 1994 – G. Bharghavan Pillai (Natankala)
- 1994 – Pazhoor Damodara Marar (Mudiyett)
- 1994 – Chandpasha (Mappilappattu)
- 1994 – Eshi Joseph (Chavittu Natakam)
- 1995 – Chandragiri Ambu (Yakshaganam)
- 1995 – K. P. Dharman Panicker (Theyyam)
- 1995 – Kadammanitta Vasudevan Pillai (Padayani)
- 1996 – Vengara Krishnan Panicker (Poorakkali)
- 1996 – Kizhara Othena Peruvannan (Theyyam)
- 1997 – Edakkottil Appukutty Asan (Thirra)
- 1997 – P. Raghavan Panicker (Poorakkali)
- 1997 – V. M. Kutty (Mappilappattu)
- 1998 – Kannan Karnamoorthy (Theyyam)
- 1998 – Savithri Brahmaniyamma (Brahmanippattu)
- 1999 – Edavalath Kannapoduval (Kolkali)
- 1999 – Pappinissery Kunhiraman Panicker (Poorakkali)
- 1999 – Joseph Moly (Chavittu Natakam)
- 2000 – Andol Balakrishna Panicker (Poorakkali)
- 2001 – P. M. Charles (Chavittu Natakam)
- 2001 – P. T. Kesavan Embranthiri (Thidambu Nritham)
- 2002 – Chippar Krishnayya Balla (Yakshaganam)
- 2002 – S. A. Jameel (Mappilappattu)
- 2002 – Maneek Manakil (Chavittu Natakam)
- 2002 – V. Balan (Poothamkali)
- 2003 – K. Dwaraka Krishnan (Kanyarkali)
- 2003 – Bakker Edakkazhiyoor (Arabanamuttu)
- 2004 – A. G. Nair (Yakshaganam)
- 2004 – K. G. Sathar (Mappilappattu)
- 2004 – Mathukutti Asan (Parichamuttukali)
- 2005 – Kurian Chacko (Margamkali)
- 2006 – P. V. Krishnan Anjoottan Nileshwaram (Theyyam)
- 2006 – Jhansi Sebastian Tripunithura (Margamkali)
- 2007 – Kurichi Natesan (Arjuna Nritham)
- 2009 – Eranjoli Moosa (Mappilappattu)
- 2011 – Thampi Payyappilly (Chavittu Natakam)
- 2011 – Sreedharan Asan (Kakkarissi Natakam)
- 2013 – Britto Vincent (Chavittu Natakam)
- 2013 – Vakkom Sajeev (Samudra Natanam)
- 2013 – Madhu Gopinath (Samudra Natanam)
- 2014 – Puthumana Govindan Namboothiri (Thidambu Nritham)
- 2014 – Kunjiraman Vaidar (Theyyam)
- 2015 – Janardhanan Puthusseri (Natanpattu)
- 2016 – Kuttur Prasannakumar (Padayani)
- 2016 – Mannur Chandran (Porattu Natakam)
- 2016 – Keezhillam Unnikrishnan (Mudiyett)
- 2017 – Roy Georgekutty (Chavittu Natakam)
- 2018 – Palamthoni Narayanan (Porattu Natakam)
- 2019 – Madikai Unnikrishnan (Thidambu Nritham, Melam)

=== Kathaprasangam ===
- 1966 – Sathyadevan
- 1978 – Joseph Kaimaparamban
- 1979 – Kollam Babu
- 1986 – Kadaikodu Viswambharan
- 1987 – V. Harshakumar
- 1989 – Vadakara V. Ashokan
- 1990 – Ochira Ramachandran
- 1991 – H. Ramlabeegam
- 1992 – Harippad Saraswathi Ammal
- 1994 – Thevarthottam Sukumaran
- 1995 – Kadavoor Balan
- 1996 – Cherthala Balachandran
- 1998 – K. P. Chandrahasan
- 1999 – Edakkochi Prabhakaran
- 2001 – Gopinath
- 2002 – Thodiyoor Vasanthakumari
- 2003 – Niranam Rajan
- 2004 – Vayalar Baburaj
- 2005 – Seena Pallikkara
- 2006 – Manamboor D. Radhakrishnan
- 2007 – Ayilam Unnikrishnan
- 2008 – Pala Nandakumar
- 2009 – Chirakkara Salimkumar
- 2010 – Marayamuttom Johny
- 2012 – Edakochi Salimkumar
- 2013 – Vinod Champakara
- 2015 – Kannur Ratnakumar
- 2016 – Sooraj Sathyan K.
- 2017 – Pulimath Sreekumar
- 2018 – M. R. Payyattam
- 2019 – Vasanthakumar Sambasivan
- 2020 – Trikkulam Krishnan Kutty
- 2021 – Vanchiyoor Praveen Kumar
- 2022 – S. Noval Raj

=== Prakshepana Kala ===
- 1975 – T. P. Radhamani
- 1981 – K. Padmanabhan Nair
- 1983 – C. S. Radhadevi
- 1987 – Rajam K. Nair
- 1990 – R. Rajakumari
- 1991 – K. V. Manikandan Nair
- 1991 – C. P. Rajasekharan
- 1992 – A. Prabhakaran
- 1993 – Nagavally R. S. Kurup
- 1994 – N. K. Sebastian
- 1999 – K. S. Ranaprathapan
- 2004 – M. Thankamani
- 2005 – K. A. Muralidharan
- 2006 – Beban Kaimaparamban
- 2007 – S. Radhakrishnan
- 2008 – Satheesh Chandran
- 2010 – T. T. Prabhakaran
- 2012 – Ravi Vallathol
- 2013 – Leelamma Mathew

=== Magic ===
- 1995 – Gopinath Muthukad
- 1997 – Padmaraj
- 2000 – Magician Samraj
- 2001 – Pradeep Hudino
- 2002 – P. M. Mithra
- 2003 – Nilambur Pradeep Kumar
- 2011 – R. K. Malayath
- 2014 – Shamsudheen Cherpulassery (Street Magic)

=== Mimicry ===
- 2010 – Kottayam Nazeer

== See also ==
- Kerala Sangeetha Nataka Akademi Fellowship
- Sangeet Natak Akademi Award
- Sangeet Natak Akademi Fellowship
