= Pathiyoor Sankarankutty =

Kathakali musician

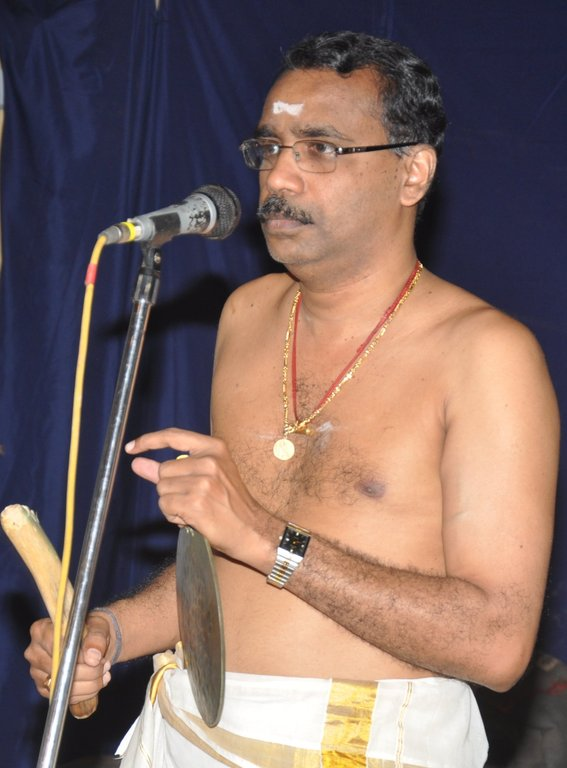
- Pathiyoor Sankarankutty
- Born: 30 December 1964 (age 61); Kayamkulam, Alappuzha, Kerala, India
- Occupation: Kathakali musician
- Spouse: Manju
- Children: 2
- Awards: Kerala Sangeetha Nataka Akademi Award; Kerala Kalamandalam Award

Pathiyoor Sankarankutty is a Kathakali musician from Kerala, India. He received many awards including the Kerala Sangeetha Nataka Akademi Award in 2018 and the Kerala Kalamandalam Award in 2009.

== Biography ==
Sankarankutty was born on December 30, 1964, as the fourth child of Mathiltheketil Krishna Pillai who was a Kathakali singer and Mazhupeil Lakshmikuttyamma in Keerikad, Kayamkulam, Alappuzha district. Although Krishna Pillai was not interested to teach his son Kathakali music, seeing his love for Kathakali he decided that the stage would be better for him. While studying in the 5th standard, he studied Kathakali acting under the tutelage of Parameswaran Nair and Shankarapilla. In 1978, he made his Kathakali acting debut as Sri Krishna in 'Gurudakshina' at the Avur Sri Krishna Swamy Temple. After that, he played many child roles in various Kathakali programmes.

After his pre-degree studies in commerce, he passed Ganabhushanam diploma from RLV College of Music and Fine Arts and then attended a short term music class at Kerala Kalamandalam to study Kathakali music. It was his guru Gangadharan who encouraged him to take Kathakali music seriously. At Kalamandalam he studied Kathakali music under many noted artists including Madambi Subramanian Namboodiri, Kalamandalam Ramawaryar and Kalamandalam Gangadharan.

=== Personal life ===
Sankarankutty and his wife Manju have two sons Shyamkrishna and Yadukrishna.

== Career ==
Pathiyoor Sankarankutty is one of the disciple of Kalamandalam Hyderali. Sankarankutty also followed the Carnatic touch given to Kathakali music by musicians including his guru Hyderali. Besides performing in Kerala and outside Kerala, he has also performed in countries like Spain, Brazil, Netherlands, Germany and France. For nearly twenty five years he has sung the accompaniment music for Kathakali performances of Kalamandalam Gopi.

In 1990, Shankarankutty became a music teacher in Pakalkuri near Kottarakkara. From 2003, he is working as a music teacher at Sandarshan Kathakali Vidyalaya, Ambalapuzha.

== Awards and honours ==
- Kerala Sangeetha Nataka Akademi Award 2018
- Kerala Kalamandalam award 2009
- The Pannissery Award 2021, given by the Pannissery Nanupilla Memorial Kathakali Club for overall contribution to Kathakali.
