= Kalamandalam Girija =

Indian Kutiyattam dancer

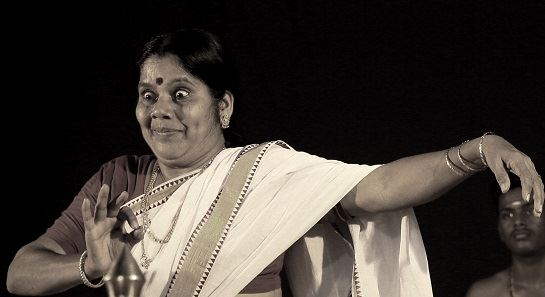
- Guru Kalamandalam Girija
- Born: 1958 (age 67–68); Kadavallur, Thrissur district, Kerala, India
- Occupation: Kutiyattam-Nangyarkoothu artist

Kalamandalam Girija is an Indian Kutiyattam dancer who is a recipient of Indian Government Award by Sangeet Natak Academy in the year 2021. She was trained by Natyakala Sarvabhouman Guru Painkulam Rama Chakyar, who played a key role in the renaissance of this genre of Indian Sanskrit Theatre & Dance. Girija was chosen by her Guru to be the first non-Nangiar student to learn Kutiyattam and she became the part of the history as the first Kutiyattam actress to perform the art outside the temple premises. She is an empanelled artist of the ICCR.

== Early life ==
Kalamandalam Girija was born (1958) in Kadavallur, Thrissur district, Kerala, in a family who depended on temples for their livelihood. Girija's father Pakshiyil Narayanan Moosad was a Pathakam exponent and her mother Devaki Manayamma played Tiruvatirakkali. Girija was familiar with the stories from Ramayana and Mahabharata which helped her accept Kutiyattam. She joined the Kerala Kalamandalam in 1971, and successfully completed her Diploma and Post Diploma in Kutiyattam within 6 years and had further training with a scholarship from Ministry of Culture, India. Apart from Painkulam Rama Chakyar she was also trained by Kunjipillakutty Nangiaramma, P. K. Narayanan Nambyar and Sanskrit scholar Unnikrishnan Ilayath. Even during her period of study she was the recipient of rewards like Dr. K. N. Pisharoti Award, and Margi Award.

Girija strengthened her name in Kutiyattam history in being the first artist to perform Nangiarkuttu outside the temples in 1984 at Kalamandalam. She has since performed internationally, and in India her stages of performance include the Sangeet Natak Akademi and Indian Council for Cultural Relations. She has influenced many of her students all over the globe to come to Kalamandalam and learn Kutiyattam and Nangiarkuttu. Her knowledge of the intrinsic acting techniques of Kutiyattam acquired during her training times in Kalamandalam kalari along with great actors like Kalamandalam Shivan Nambootiri and Kalamandalam Rama Chakyar add to her uniqueness as the only female artist in the history of Kutiyattam who is well versed both male and female characters of the art.

In 2001, the Kerala Government awarded Girija the Kerala Sangeetha Nataka Akademi Award. She received the Painkulam Rama Chakyar Smaraka Award in 2008, Kerala Kalamandalam Award in 2009 Kalasagar Award in 2012, Kendra Sangeet Natak Academy Award in 2021, Keraleeya Nrutha Natya Puraskaram in 2026 & Sree Guruvayoorappam Kshetra Kala Puraskaram in 2026. She has choreographed Kutiyattam (plays like Venisamharam Act I - 2007, Balacharitam Act II- Bhagavathy Pravesham 2010, Naganandam Act IV- Parakkumkoothu- 2013, Veneesamharam 2015, Thapatheesamwaranam -Ozhukum Nangiar -2016 ), Swapanavasavadhatham- 2017, Naishadhanandaham- 2019 as well as Nangiarkoothus (like Gandharivilapam- 2005, Karnolpathi -2007, Madhavi -2010, Kaikaseeyam 2013).

Girija has been working as Kutiyattam and Nangiarkuttu instructor at Kerala Kalamandalam since 1981 and now retired from official services in 2014 as the Head of the Department. She continues to be the "Guru" or main instructor of Mrunmaya Centre for Theatrical Research, with initiatives to disseminate the art of Koodiyattam and also serves as visiting faculty for various Indian and International Theatre departments. In 2016, she was re invited to Kerala Kalamandalam Deemed University of Art, Kerala as the Visiting Faculty Head for Kutiyattam Department where her skills as a teacher and a director would be utilized to develop Post Graduation and Research Students.

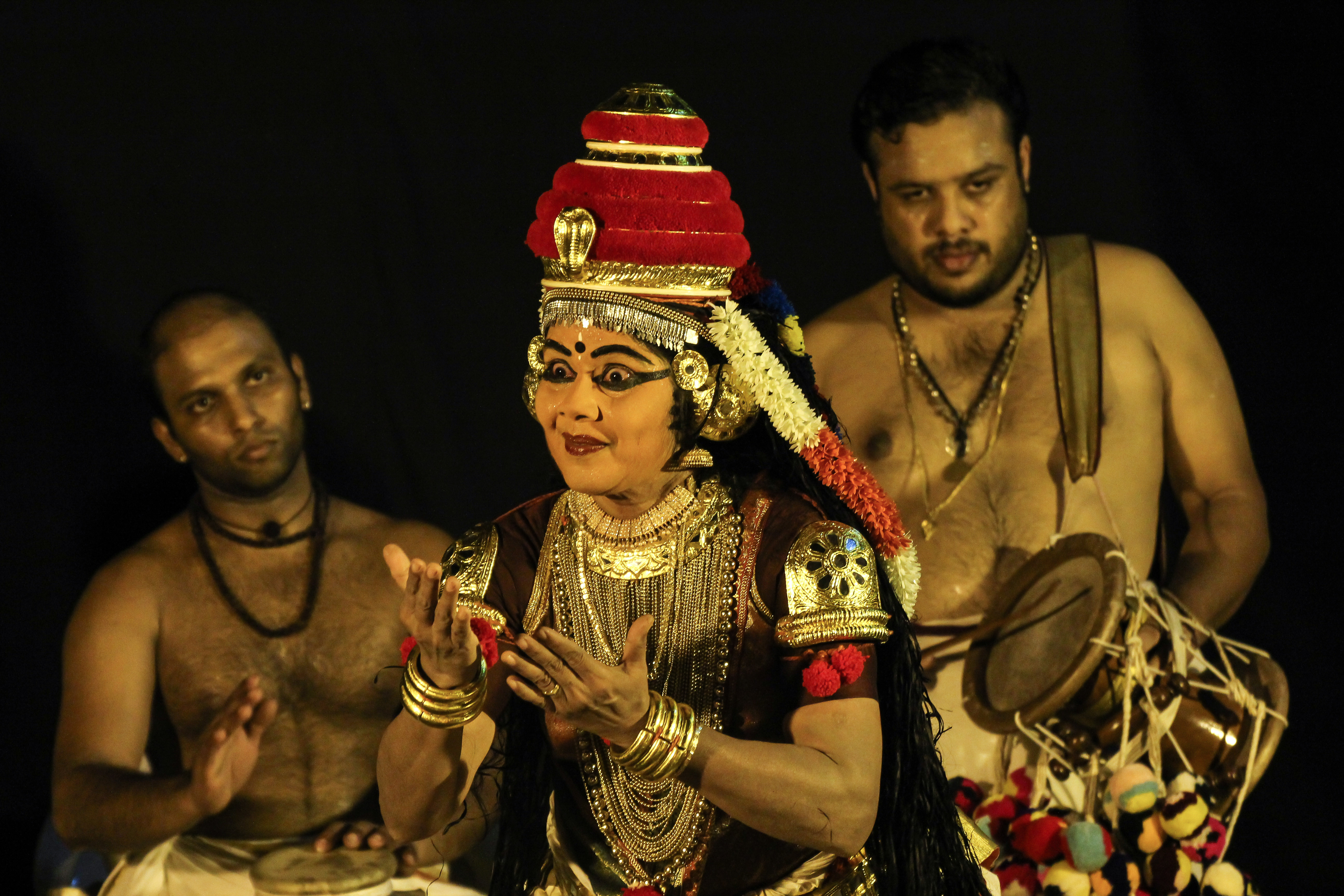
Kalamandalam Girija 1

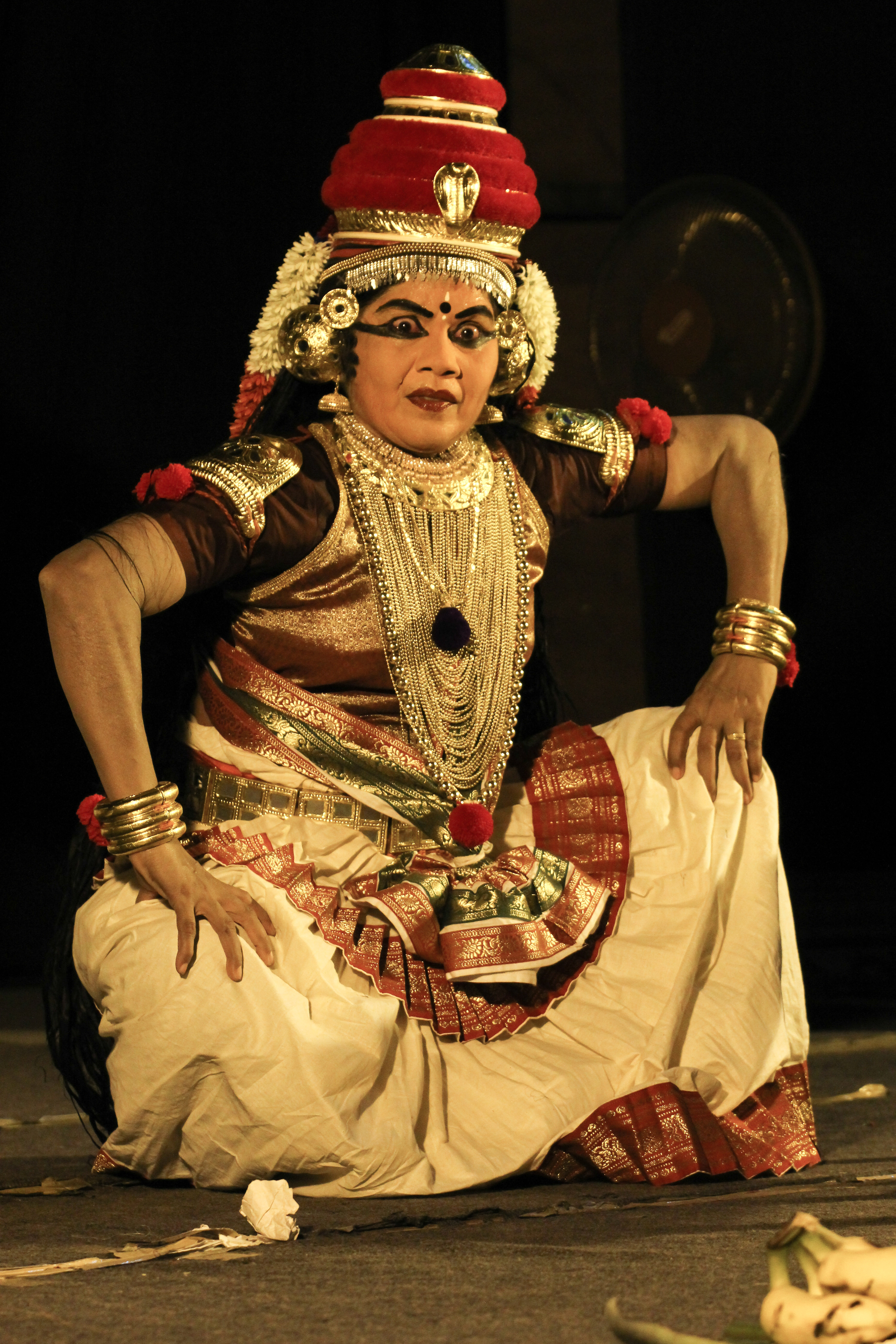
Kalamandalam Girija 2

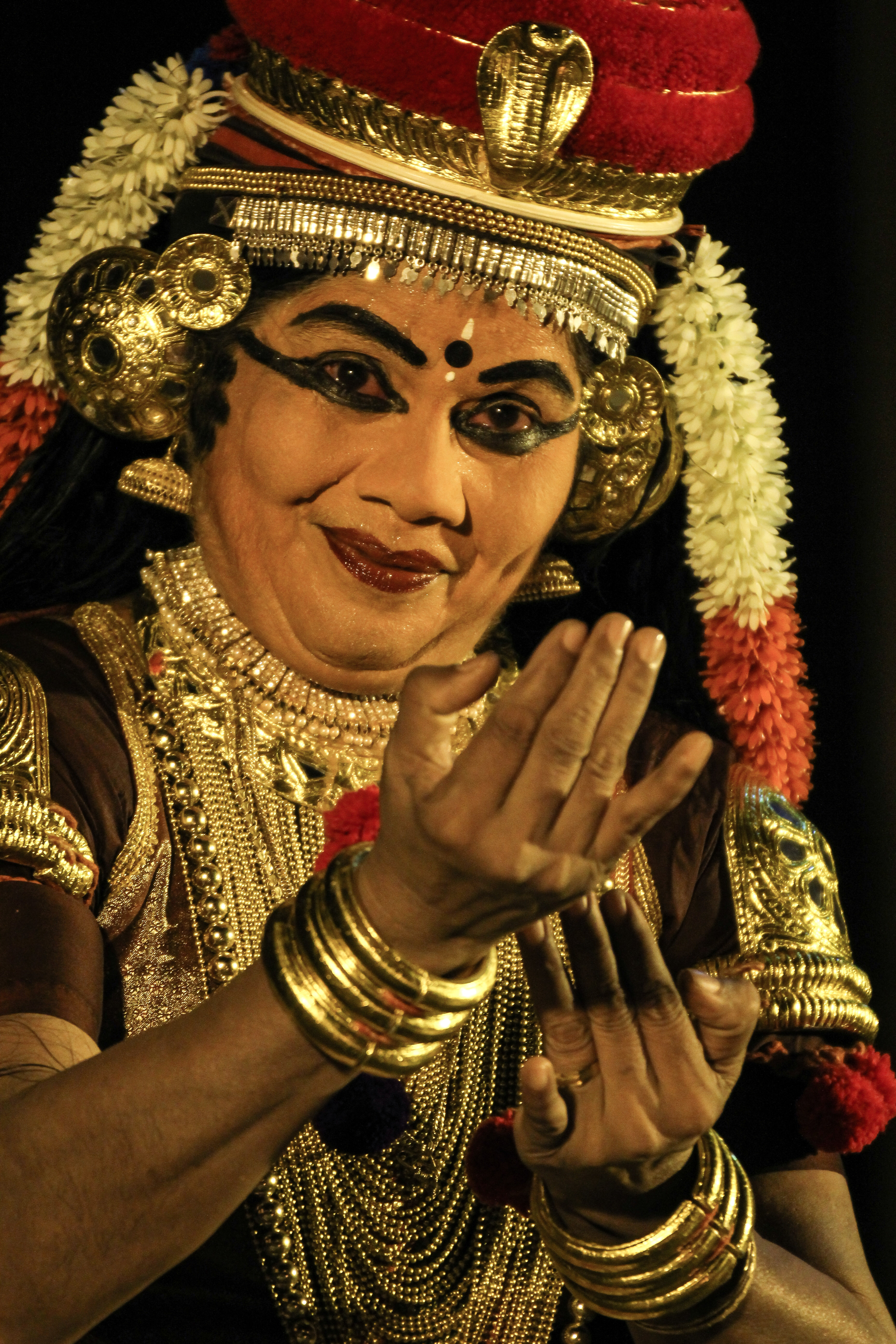
Kalamandalam Girija

== See also ==
- Koodiyattam
- Kerala Kalamandalam
