= Kalamandalam K. G. Vasudevan Nair =

Indian dancer (born 1937)

Kalamandalam K.G. Vasudevan Nair
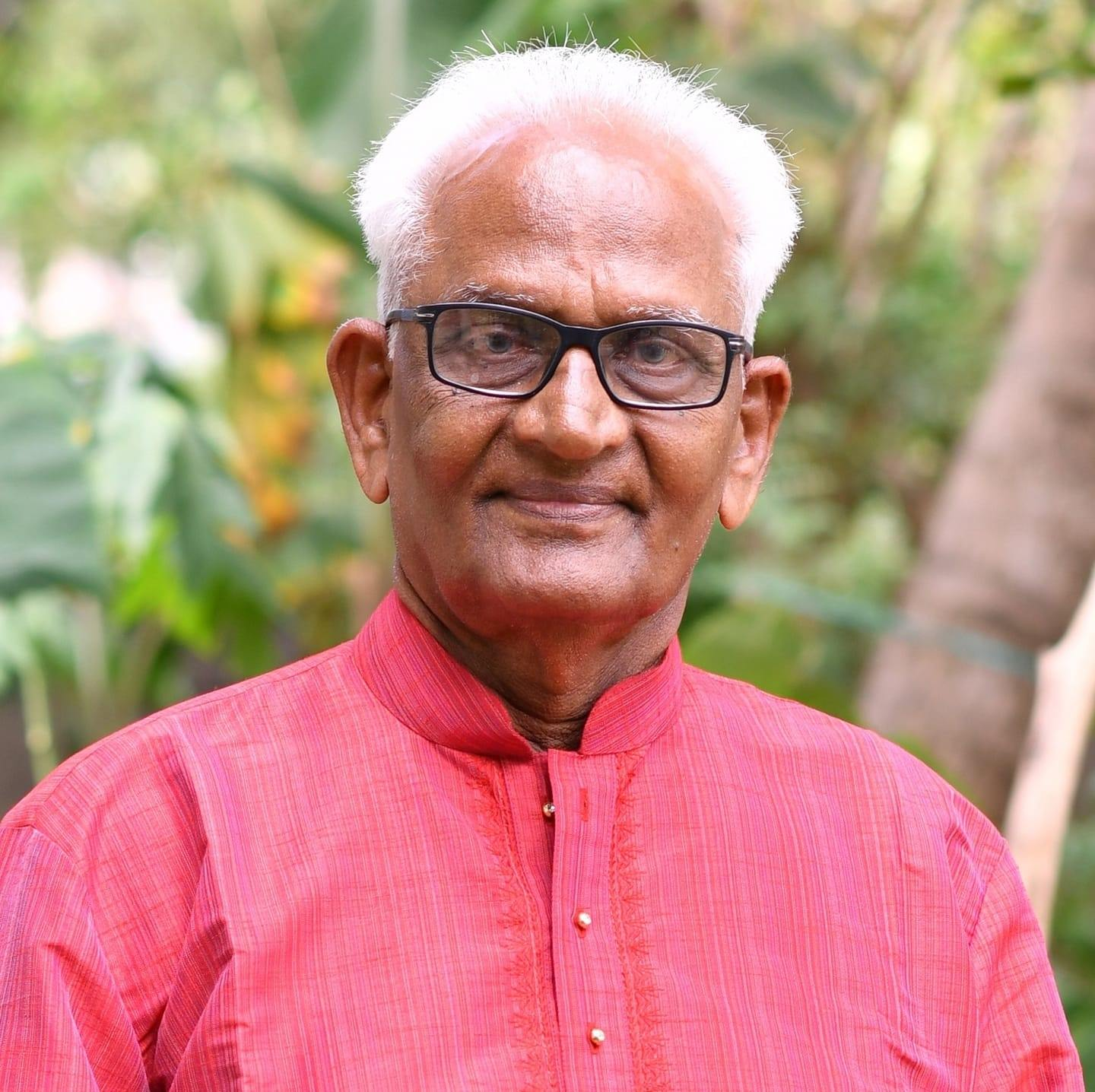
- K. G. Vasudevan Nair
- Born: K.G. Vasudevan Nair; 1937 (age 88–89); Keerikkad, British India (present-day Kerala, India)
- Awards: Sangeet Natak Akademi Award (2010); Kerala Sangeetha Nataka Akademi Award (2006); Kerala Kalamandalam Award and Fellowship

Kalamandalam K.G. Vasudevan Nair is a Kathakali dancer from Kerala in India. He is a recipient of Kerala Kalamandalam Award, Takazhi Kunju Kurup Fellowship by Kerala Kalamandalam, Kerala Sangeetha Nataka Akademi Award and Sangeet Natak Akademi Award by Sangeet Natak Akademi, Government of India.

== Biography ==
Kalamandalam Kombil Gopalan Vasudevan Nair was born in 1937 in the Keerikkad in present-day Alappuzha district in Kerala. Vasudevan Nair began his Kathakali training at a very early age under Kathakali guru Evoor Raghavan Pillai, who lived in his neighborhood. At the age of 11, he made his debut as Krishna in Gurudakshina at the Evur Sree Krishna Temple. Later, he started playing small roles with Kalamandalam Krishnan Nair, Chengannur Raman Pillai, Mankulam Krishnan Namboothiri, Haripad Ramakrishnan, and Chennithala Chellappan Pillai.

He then studied under K. R. Kumaran Nair and Vazhenkada Kunchu Nair and later joined Kerala Kalamandalam at the age of 14, for a post-diploma in Kathakali, where he studied Kathakali under Ramankutty Nair and Padmanabhan Nair.

=== Personal life ===
Vasudevan Nair is married to Prema Kumari and they have two children, Latha and Latheesh.

== Career ==
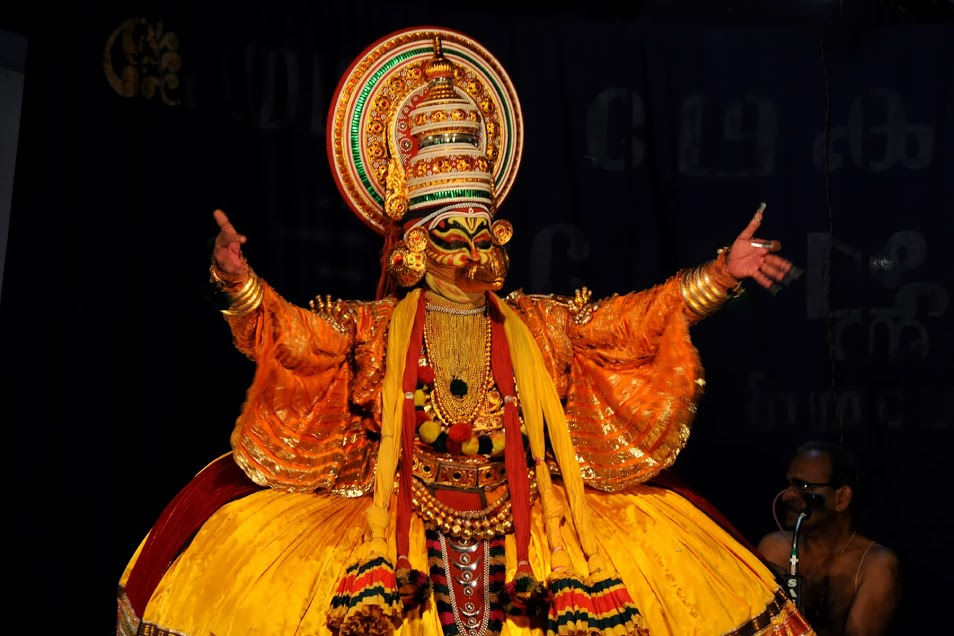
Vasudevan Nair during a Kathakali performance

Vasudevan Nair is a master of the Kalluvazhi style of Kathakali, and his roles in Pacha (pious, gentle, and noble characters) and Kathi (anti-heroes and negative characters) are notable. He has excelled in portraying male roles such as Rukmangada, Nala, Krishna, Kichaka, and Ravana, and in portraying female roles such as Urvashi, Lalitha, Damayanti, and Mohini. He has traveled to various places in India, several European countries, and the United States for lectures and performances.

Vasudevan Nair has also worked as a Kathakali teacher at the Gandhi Seva Sadan Kathakali Academy and Vellinezhi Government High School. Sadanam Krishnankutty and Sadanam P. V. Balakrishnan are his disciples. He is currently a member of the Governing Body of the Kerala Sangeetha Nataka Akademi.

== Awards and honors ==
Vasudevan Nair is a recipient of Kerala Kalamandalam Award, Kerala Sangeetha Nataka Akademi Award and Sangeet Natak Akademi Award by Sangeet Natak Akademi, Government of India. He received the first Kathakali Acharya Award, instituted by the Barnassery Mudra Kalakshetram in memory of Kathakali Acharya Kalamandalam Sankaranarayanan Nair, in February 2024. He received the Takazhi Kunju Kurup Fellowship by the Kerala Kalamandalam in January 2025. In 2025 June, he received the Madhavapriya Award 2025, instituted by the Thiruvilvamala Ivarmatham Madhav Warrior Memorial Trust in memory of Pampady Ivarmatham Madhav Warrior.
