= Krithika Subrahmanian =

Indian entrepreneur, architect, designer, aesthete, hotelier, author and dancer

- Born: Chennai, Tamil Nadu
- Education: Anna University Chennai, Graduate School of Business Stanford Seed, Harvard Business School SELP
- Occupations: Architect Designer Aesthete, hotelier and author
- Known for: Architecture, Indian classical dance

Krithika Subrahmanian is a serial entrepreneur, architect, designer, aesthete, hotelier, author and Indian classical dancer.

== Early life and education ==
Krithika Subrahmanian was born in Chennai, Tamil Nadu. She graduated as an architect from Anna University, Chennai SAP School of Architecture and Planning. An alumnus of Harvard Business School, Boston Massachusetts. Krithika and Transform group are an alumnus of Graduate School of Business Stanford University in the SEED.

== Career ==
Subrahmanian is the co-founder and director of Sreshta Leisure, Hospitality company, Metafore and Transform an architecture company based in Chennai. She is also the founder of Svatma, boutique hotel in Tamil Nadu.

=== Dance career ===
Krithika, a classical dancer in the Tanjore style of Bharatanatyam, has performed at performing arts venues and for dance festivals such as the Delhi International Arts Festival, the London International Dance Festival, NJPAC, and MACH.

In 2017, Krithika founded the Namaargam dance group, through which she has collaborated on works with musician Ilaiyaraaja, actor Suhasini Maniratnam and dancer Gopika Varma, orator Dushyanth Sridhar, to name a few.

== Publications ==
- Subrahmanian, Krithika (2019). The Next Big Thing Thanjavur. Notion Press. ISBN 978-9352915088.
