= Sadanam K. Harikumaran =

Indian-American artist (born 1958)

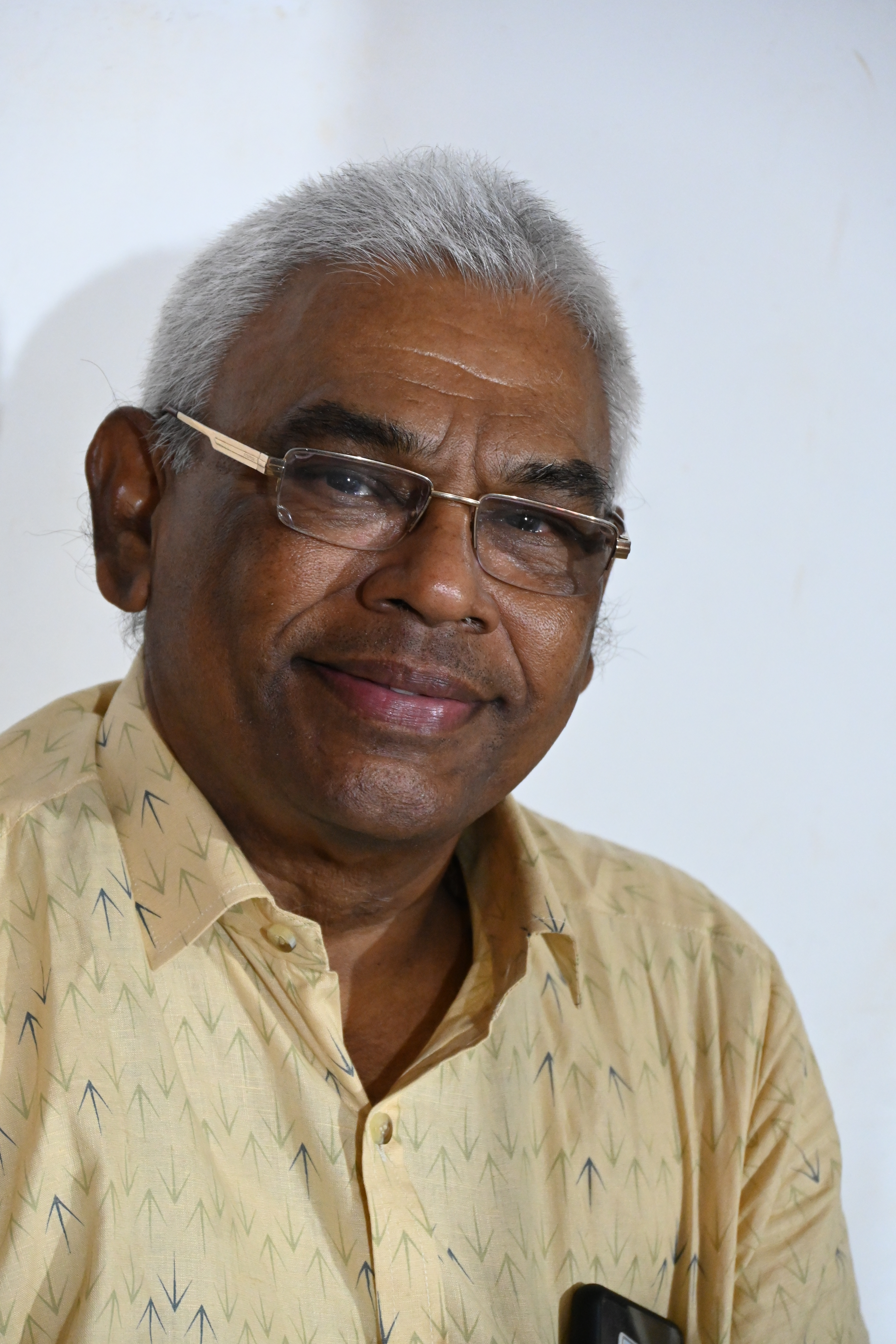
- Born: Kerala, India
- Occupations: Art historian, author, cultural administrator

Sadanam K. Harikumaran (also written as Harikumar) is a versatile artiste from Kerala in south India, known for his engagements with Indian classical dances and music, besides painting, sculpting and literature.

== Early life ==
Harikumaran was born on 8 February 1958, in Peroor village of Palakkad district. His father, K. Kumaran, was a freedom fighter and founder of Gandhi Seva Sadan. His mother, Sarojini Amma, was the daughter of Kakkad Karanavappad, one of the founders of Kerala Kalamandalam. He took to Kathakali at an early age, but parallelly did his formal education, completing his masters in his mother tongue Malayalam in the process.

== Career ==
Harikumaran had left Kerala for a while when he worked as a professor in Kathakali at the Visva-Bharati University, Santiniketan, in West Bengal for five years since 1989. It was during that stint that he began doing painting and sculpting in a prolific way. Back in Kerala, he continued his experiments with plastic arts even as he rejoined Sadanam and subsequently became its principal. For over a decade, Harikumaran has also been making Kathakali costumes (koppu), sometimes in an innovative way, and also experimenting with its make-up (chutti). He also delivers talks at seminars on Kathakali.

As of 2008 he is principal of Gandhi Seva Sadan (Sadanam Kathakali Akademi), he is basically an actor-dancer of Kathakali, but also sings for it besides writing storyplays for the classical dance-drama. Padma Shri Keezhpadam Kumaran Nair is his main Kathakali guru.

Harikumaran is an All India Radio-certified Carnatic musician, having been chiefly guided in that art by the late Prof C.S. Krishna Iyer. He regularly performs Carnatic concerts throughout Kerala, an important place being Chembai Sangeetholsavam at Guruvayoor. He has also written around 50 compositions, mostly in Malayalam. He also used to perform Bharatanatyam and Mohiniyattam (guru: Kalamandalam Leelamma) during his college days.

Harikumaran has penned 19 Kathakali story-plays (attakathas). They include Sapamochanam, Karnaparvam, Abhimanyu, Manikantacharitam, Charudattam (based on the story of Julius Caesar), Chitrangada, Puruvamsodayam, Kadraveyam, Karnaparithyagam, Namami Shankaram, Karthaveerarjuna Nigraham, Maagadheyam, Soorpankhaangam, Hindumbi, Kaali and Sikhandi.

In 2014, he received the Kerala Sangeetha Nataka Akademi Award in the category Kathakali.
