= Kuzhur Narayana Marar =

Indian musician

- Born: 25 May 1925; Kuzhur, Thrissur, Kerala, India
- Died: 11 August 2011 (aged 86); Ernakulam
- Occupations: Musician, percussionist
- Awards: Padmabhushan; Pallavur Appu Marar Puraskaram; Kerala Sangeetha Nataka Academy Award; Panchvadya Kulapathi

Kuzhur Narayana Marar (25 May 1925 – 11 August 2011) was an Indian musician, considered to be one of the masters of Panchavadyam. He was awarded Padmabhushan by Government of India for his contributions to the propagation of Panchavadyam in 2010. He is the first Panchavadyam exponent to receive Padmabhushan award.

== Biography ==
Narayana Marar was born in Kuzhur, a tiny hamlet near Mala in Thrissur district in Kerala to Manikyamangalam Vadakkini Kochupilla Kurup and Kuzhur Neduparambath Kunjipilla Amma on 25 May 1925. He started learning Panchavadyam at the early age of five under the tutelage of his father. Later he learned Keli from Eravipurath Appu Marar, Thimila from Perumpilli Kesava Marar and Thayambaka from Manikyamangalam Narayana Marar.

Narayan Marar died at the age of 86 on 11 August 2011.

== Legacy ==
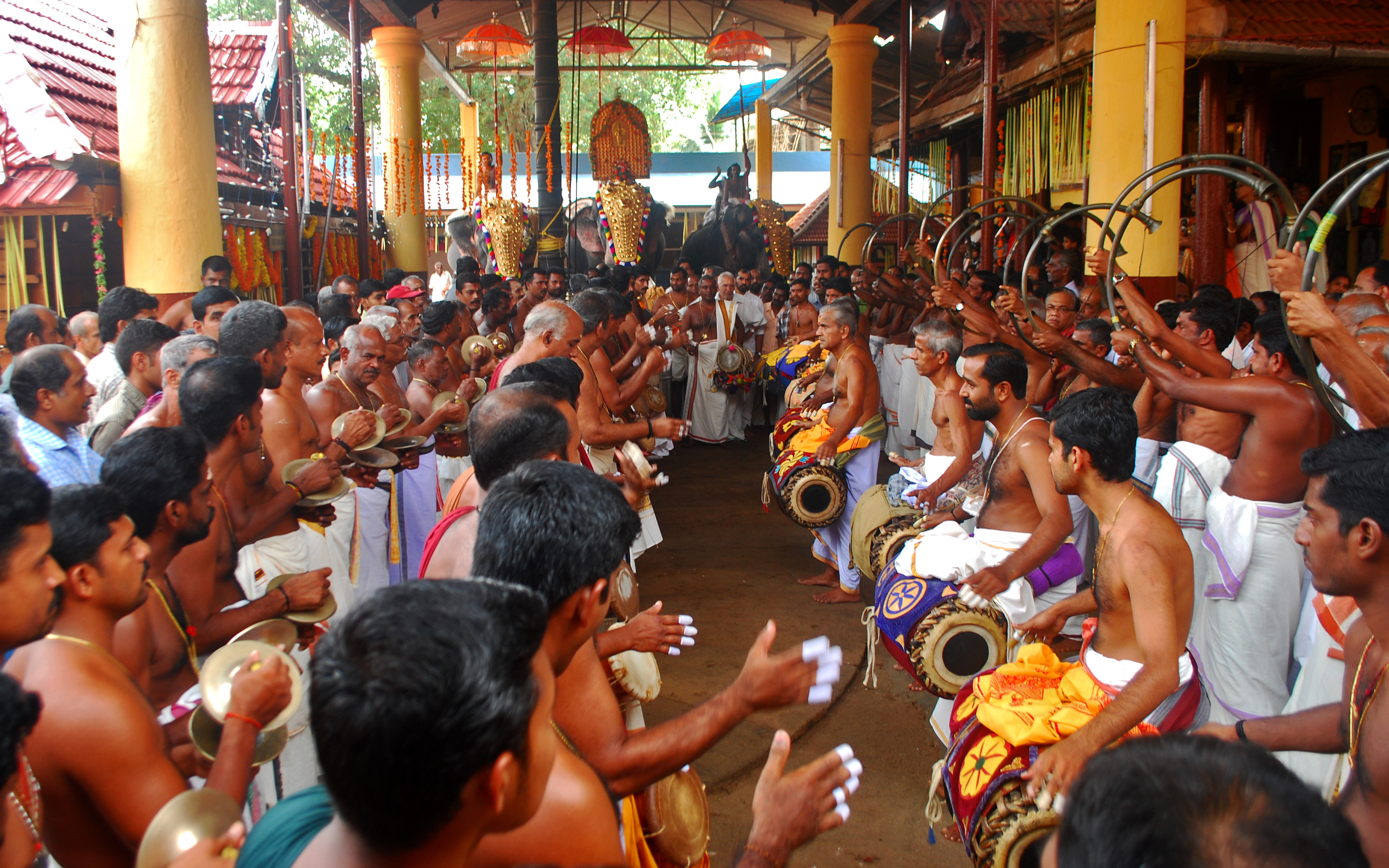
Panchavadyam Cherpulasseri Ayyappan Kaavu, Kerala, India

Narayana Marar along with his two elder brothers, Kuttappa Marar and Chandran Marar were called Kuzhur triumvirate. They together created a new style in Panchavadyam rendition and were a regular presence at the Pooram festivals of Kerala. Narayana Marar started participating in Thrissur Pooram from the age of 19 and was a regular till retired at the age of 60.

== Awards ==
- Pallavur Appu Marar Puraskaram - 2005
- Kerala Sangeetha Nataka Akademi Award - 1991
- Panchvadya Kulapathi Puraskaram
