= Kalamandalam Sugandhi =

Indian Mohiniyattam dancer

- Born: Sugandhi; 2 December 1950 (age 75); Thuravoor, Alappuzha district, Kerala, India
- Other name: Sugandhi Prabhu
- Occupations: Dancer, choreographer, Dance teacher
- Known for: Indian Classical Dance/ Mohiniyattam
- Spouse: K. R. Damodara Prabhu
- Children: 2, Nanditha Prabhu and Naveen D. Prabhu
- Parent(s): G. Sreenivasa Kamath; Anandi Kamath
- Awards: Sangeet Natak Akademi Award; Kerala Sangeetha Nataka Akademi Fellowship; Kerala Sangeetha Nataka Akademi Award; Kerala Konkani Sahitya Academy Award; Kerala Kalamandalam Award

Kalamandalam Sugandhi is a Mohiniyattam dancer, choreographer and dance teacher from Kerala, India. She received several awards including Sangeet Natak Akademi Award, Kerala Sangeetha Nataka Akademi Award, Kerala Sangeetha Nataka Akademi Fellowship, Kerala Konkani Sahitya Academy Award and Kerala Kalamandalam Award.

== Biography ==
Kalamandalam Sugandhi was born on 1950 December 2, in a Konkani family at Valamgalam near Thuravoor in Alappuzha district to G. Sreenivasa Kamath and Anandi Kamath. The family had given her considerable support in making her a dancer. She started learning Bharathanatyam at the age of seven from Sathidevi, a graduate of Thrippunithura RLV College of Music and Fine Arts. After two years, she trained Bharathanatyam under Palluruthy Surendranath.

At the suggestion of K. N. Pisharody, Guru Gopinath, Tripunithura Madhava Menon and Kavalam Narayana Panicker, her father added Sugandhi to study in the Kerala Kalamandalam. At the time of joining, her basic interest was on Bharathanatyam. In Kalamandalam she studied under Kalamandalam Satyabhama, Kalamandalam Chandrika and A. B. R. Bhaskar. She studied Mohinayattam in 1968, as part of the last phase of the Bharathanatyam diploma course.

After completing the course in 1969, at the age of 19, M. K. K. Nair the then chairman of Kalamandalam, who was also the chairman of FACT, appointed her as Mohiniyattam teacher in the art department of FACT. That is how she gets closer to Mohiniyattayam. Realizing Sugandhi's fascination with classical dance forms, Nair sent her to Vedanta Prahlad Sharma to study Kuchipudi.

Sugandhi met Bharathanatyam exponent Padma Subramaniam at a dance event in FACT and their relationship turned into a deep friendship.

Later, in her 50s, she studied B.A in Malayalam from University of Calicut, and M.A in Mohiniyattam from Kerala Kalamandalam. At the age of 71, Sugandhi done her Doctorate in "Development of Pedagogy for Mohiniyattam Based on Natya Sastra" from Thanjavur Sastra University under Padma Subramaniam. Currently she is working as the Academic Dean in Kerala Kalamandalam.

=== Personal life ===
Sugandhi and her husband K. R. Damodara Prabhu have two children, Nanditha Prabhu, who is the founder of Mythri Centre for Arts, Chennai, and Naveen D. Prabhu who is a colonel in Indian Army. Prabhu was an employee of FACT where she first joined as a Mohiniyattam teacher. They reside in Vidyanagar, near Cochin University campus in Ernakulam district.

== Noted performances ==
Some of her performances include a full-length Mohiniyattam concert based on works of Swathi Thirunal Rama Varma, Radha Madhavam based on Ashtapadi and Chithrangam, a dance Self-composed and taught to over a thousand dancers, on the occasion of the arrival of Sri Sri Ravi Shankar to Kerala.

== Notable disciples ==
Her disciples include Neena Prasad, Gopika Varma, Pallavi Krishnan, Swetha Mangalath, Priya Nair.

== Books written ==
- Bharata Kala Lakshanam (Malayalam translation of Padma Subrahmanyam's Tamil book Bharata Kalai Kotpadu)
- Natyavedu-Panchovo Vedu (in Konkani)
- Now she is writing a book Hasta Ratnakaram which deals with hand gestures in Mohiniyattam

== Awards and honours ==
- Kerala State Schools Youth Festival 1962, First in Bharathanatyam
- First in Kerala Kalamandakam Bharathanatyam competition 1962
- Pundareenath Bhuvanendra Award of the Kerala Konkani Sahitya Academy 1971
- Kerala Sangeetha Nataka Akademi Award 1985
- ITC Golden Greats Award 1990
- Senior Fellowship from Human Resource Development Ministry, Govt of India 1990
- Pundareenath Bhuvanendra Puraskar from Kerala Konkini Sahithya Academy 1997
- Award from Tapasya Sahithya Vedi and New Delhi Samskrita Bharati 1997
- Kerala Kalamandalam Award 1999
- Senior Fellowship from Ministry of Culture, Govt. of India 2003
- Dr.T.M.A Pai Foundation Award 2003
- Sangeet Natak Akademi Award 2004
- Kerala Sangeetha Nataka Akademi Fellowship 2011
- Kalaratna award from Kerala Sangeetha Nataka Akademi 2012
