= Sadanam Krishnankutty =

Indian Kathakali performer (born 1941)

- സദനം കൃഷ്ണൻകുട്ടി
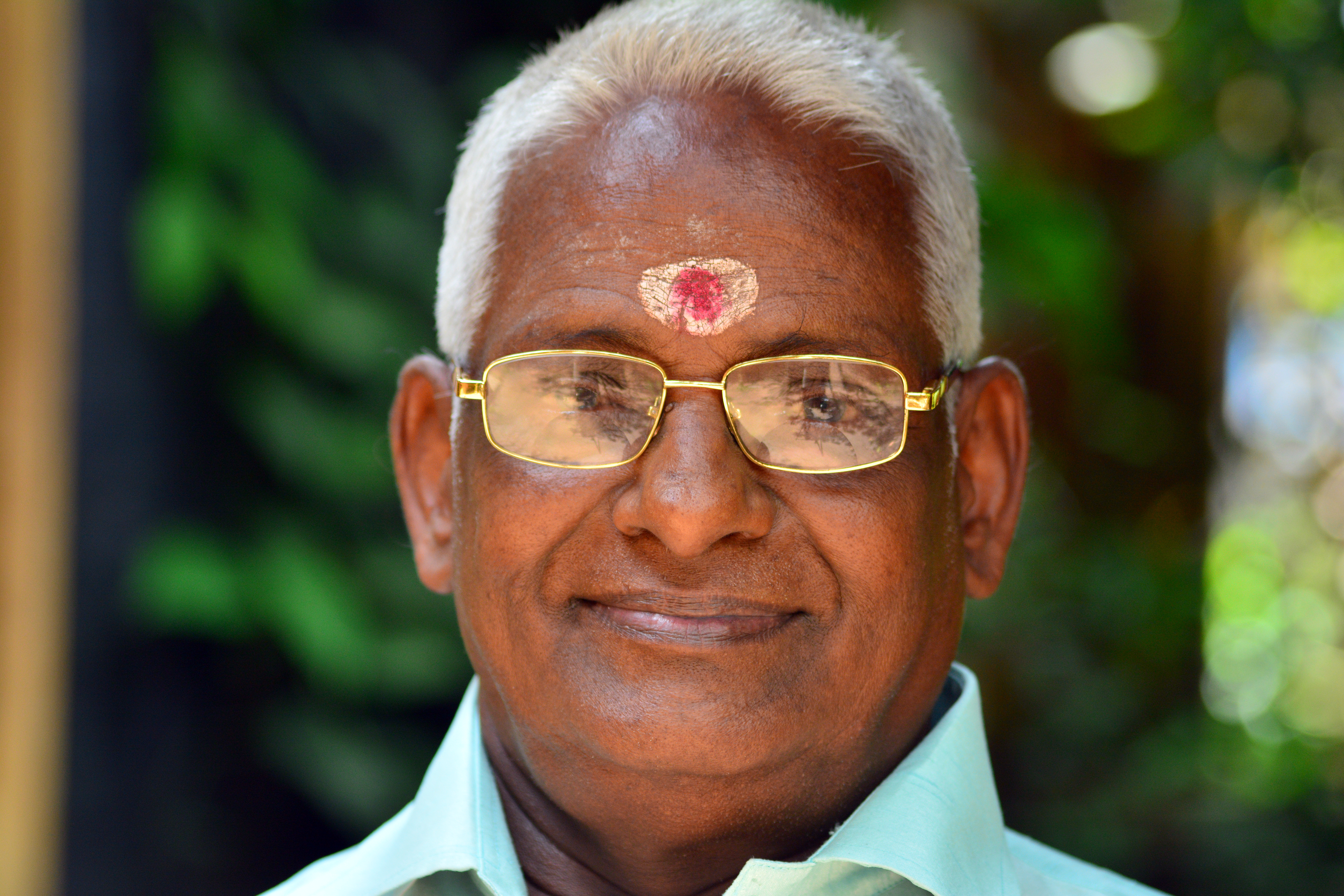
- Sadanam Krishnankutty
- Born: 1941 (age 84–85); Cherpulassery, Palakkad, Kerala, India
- Occupations: Kathakali Performer and Trainer

Sadanam Krishnankutty (born Cherpulassery, 1941) is a performer of Kathakali, a classical dance-drama form of Kerala, South India. A recipient of Kerala State Kathakali award and Kalamandalam fellowship, he has played a wide range of characters in his acts. He received the Kerala Sangeetha Nataka Akademi Award in 2002, the Sangeet Natak Akademi Award in 2007, Honorary D.litt from Thunchath Ezhuthachan Malayalam University, Thirur, Kerala in 2021 and the Sangeet Natak Akademi Fellowship in 2021.

== Early life ==
A native of Cherpulassery in Palakkad district, the 1941-born Krishnankutty was a disciple of Keezhpadam Kumaran Nair. He had his initial lessons under Thekkinkatil Ramunni Nair, and has also taken eye exercise and Rasa-Abhinaya classes from Mani Madhava Chakyar.

Krishnakutty had his Kathakali lessons at Sadanam Kathakali Akademi (Gandhi Seva Sadan) east of Ottapalam. He was, for a brief while, Kathakali tutor at the Kerala Kalamandalam, Unnayi Varier Smaraka Kalanilayam in Irinjalakuda and Kala Mandir in Patna. A winner of the Kerala Sangeetha Nataka Akademi Award (2002) and the Central Sangeet Natak Akademi Award (2006), he is known for his portrayal of roles in classical stories as well as newly staged Kathakali plays.

Krishnankutty lives in Irinjalakuda town of Thrissur district.

== See also ==
- Kathakali
- Kutiyattam
- Mani Madhava Chakyar
