= Kalamandalam Unnikrishnan =

Indian Chenda exponent (born 1958)

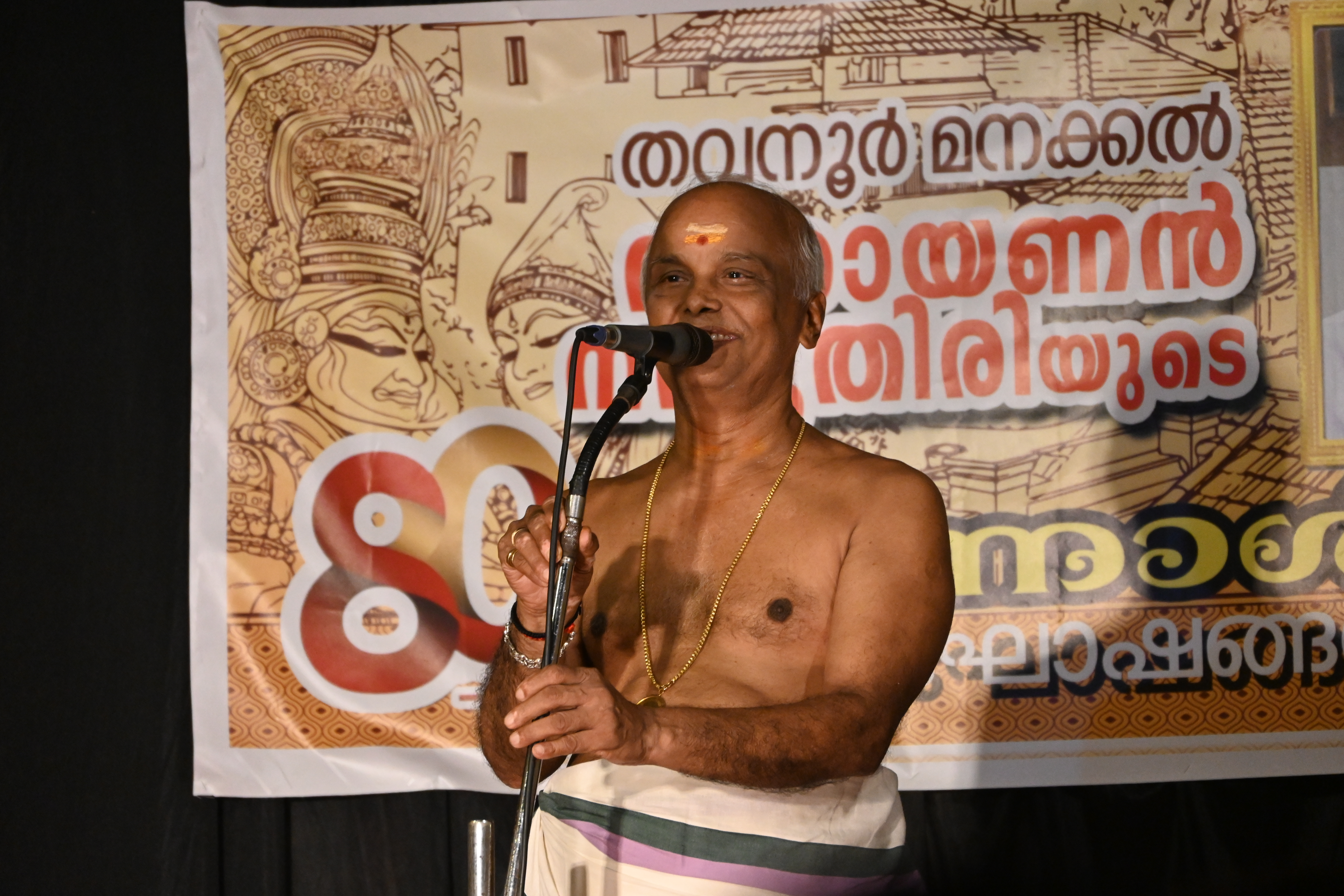
- Born: M. Unnikrishnan; October 10, 1958 (age 68); Kolathur in Malappuram district, Kerala, India
- Occupations: Chenda exponent and teacher
- Spouse: Kalamandalam Sudha
- Children: 2
- Awards: Kerala Sangeetha Nataka Akademi Award (2018); Kerala Kalamandalam Fellowship (2022)

Kalamandalam Unnikrishnan is an Indian percussionist from Kerala. He is an exponent of Chenda. He received the Kerala Sangeetha Nataka Akademi Award for Kathakali Chenda in 2019 and Kerala Kalamandalam Fellowship for Chenda in 2022.

== Biography ==
M. Unnikrishnan popularity known as Kalamandalam Unnikrishnan was born on October 10, 1958, as eldest of six children of Ramakrishnan Nair and Maniattu Dakshayani Amma, in Kolathur in Malappuram district of Kerala. His father who was a daily-wage labourer in Kolathur was also a part-time ritualistic chenda player at a temple near his house. His brother Kottakkal Ravi is a Maddalam exponent at the Kottakkal PSV Natya Sangh. He started learning Chenda under Narayana Kurup at the age of eight. Later he joined Kerala Kalamandalam and studied chenda under Chandra Mannadiyar and Achunni Pothuval.

=== Personal life ===
Unnikrishnan and his wife Kalamandalam Sudha, who is a classical dancer, have two daughters, Sreeranjini and Kavyashree.

== Career ==
After completing studies, Unnikrishnan joined his alma mater Kerala Kalamandalam as a Chenda teacher in 1982. He retired as principal of Kerala Kalamandalam Deemed University in 2015.

Unnikrishnan also served as the president of the Kathakali Artists Association.

As a performer Unnikrishnan mainly plays Chenda as background music for Kathakali performances.

== Works on him ==
Melaprayanam: The Saga of a Drummer directed by filmmaker Vinu Vasudevan is a documentary on the life of Kalamandalam Unnikrishnan.

== Awards and honors ==
In 2019, Unnikrishnan received the Kerala Sangeetha Nataka Akademi Award for Kathakali Chenda for the year 2018. In 2022, he has been awarded the Kerala Kalamandalam Fellowship for Chenda, for the year 2021.
