= Kalamandalam Rama Chakyar =

Indian Koodiyattam dancer

Kalamandalam Rama Chakyar (also spelled as Kalamandalam Ramanchakyar) is a Koodiyattam artist from Kerala, India.

== Biography ==
He was born in 1950, to Koyppa Chakyar Madam Kavutty Illodamma and Ammannoor Parameswara Chakyar at Painkulam village in Thrissur district. His father was a great scholar of "Kramadeepika" and "Attaprakaram". At the age of twelve, he started learning Koodiyattam from his maternal grand uncle Painkulam Rama Chakyar. When his uncle joined in Kerala Kalamandalam in 1965, he continued learning Koodiayattam in Kerala Kalamandalam, and later he became Chairman of the Koodiyattam department of the Kerala Kalamandalam. He is currently a visiting professor at Kerala Kalamandalam.

== Awards and honours ==
- 2013: Kerala Government's Nrithanatya Award.
- 2008: Kerala Sangeetha Nataka Akademi Award
- A group of Koodiyattam artists are making a detailed documentary film based on Guru Kalamandalam Rama Chakyar.
