= Karakulam Chandran =

Indian actor (1950–2018)

- Born: 19 April 1950; Karakulam, Thiruvananthapuram district Kerala
- Died: 7 December 2018 (aged 68); Thiruvananthapuram district Kerala
- Occupations: drama director, drama-television serial-movie actor
- Partner: Soosan Chandran
- Children: Nitheesh Chandran (son); Nithin Chandran (son)
- Parents: Narayana Pillai; Vishalakshi Amma

Karakulam Chandran is a Malayalam language drama, television serial, film actor and drama director from Kerala, India. He has directed 118 plays and acted in over fifty plays. He has also acted in 88 television serials and five movies. He has won more than eighty state level awards, including the state award for best drama director (in 1997, 1998, 1999, 2000 years), Kerala Sangeetha Nataka Akademi Award for Best Drama Director (2008), the State Government's special jury award for best serial actor (2015) and the Ramu Karyat Award for outstanding contribution (2008).

== Biography ==
He was born on 19 April 1950, to Narayana Pillai and Vishalakshi Amma at Nellivila House, Karakulam, near Nedumangad in Thiruvananthapuram district.

At the age of four, he began his acting career as a child actor in a play in a rural library. After joining as a student in Prof. G. Sankara Pillai's drama school, he became active in the field of professional drama in 1968. Vayala Vasudevan Pillai's Theerthadanam was his first professional play.

=== Personal life ===
Karakulam Chandran and his wife Susan Chandran have two sons Nithish Chandran and Nitin Chandran, both journalists under Malayala Manorama group.

== Career ==
Karakulam Chandran excelled in the field of theater under Thoppil Bhasi for more than a decade. He worked for KPAC from 1970 to 1981 and formed the Ajanta drama troupe from Kollam in 1985. Ajantha performed about twenty plays. He has directed 118 plays and acted in over fifty plays. He has also acted in 88 television serials and five Malayalam movies. The last play he acted in was Ajantha's Aakashavilakku.

He died on 7 December 2018, due to a heart attack.

== Awards ==
- Kerala State Drama Award - in 1997, 1998, 1999 and 2000
- Kerala Sangeetha Nataka Akademi Award for Best Drama Director (2008)
- State Government Special Jury Award for Best Serial Actor (2015)
- Ramu Kariyat Award for Outstanding Contribution (2008)
- He received more than eighty state-level awards, and more than 800 awards including local awards.
