= V. K. Hymavathy =

Indian Mohiniyattam dancer

- Born: 12 October 1955 (age 70); Thrissur district, Kerala
- Other name: Kalamandalam Hymavathy
- Occupations: Dancer, Dance teacher
- Known for: Indian Classical Dance/ Mohiniyattam
- Spouse: Chandrasekharan
- Children: 1
- Parent(s): Krishna Warrier; Parvati warrier
- Awards: Sangeet Natak Akademi Award; Kerala Sangeetha Nataka Akademi Gurupooja Award; Kerala Sangeetha Nataka Akademi Award

V. K. Hymavathy popularly known as Kalamandalam Hymavathy is a Mohiniyattam dancer and dance teacher from Kerala, India. She received several awards including Sangeet Natak Akademi Award, Kerala Sangeetha Nataka Akademi Gurupooja Award and Kerala Sangeetha Nataka Akademi Award.

== Biography ==
V. K. Hymavathy was born on 12 October 1955, to Krishna Warrier of Peringode, Thrissur and Parvathy Warrier of Machad. Her father was a physician. Her family moved to Cheruthuruthi when she was one year old. At the age of five, she started learning dance under Chandrika, and Kathakali under Sankaranarayanan Asan. She performed dance in Kerala Kalamandalam at the age of 12, with her sister Rugmini. Later, she joined Kalamandalam to study dance, under Kalamandalam Satyabhama, Leelamani and Chandrika and completed her diploma course at the age of 16.

After marriage, at the age of 19 she moved to Calcutta but returned soon to Kerala when she got a job as Mohiniyattam teacher in Kalamandalam. While working at Kalamandalam, Hymavathy studied Kuchipudi under Kalamandalam Kshemavathy. After 33 years of service, she retired from Kalamandalam as Head of the Department of Mohiniyattam, and later joined Kalady Sanskrit University as a Visiting Professor.

=== Personallife ===
She and her husband Chandrasekharan have one son. They lives in their house Srikrishnasadanam in Cheruthuruthy, Thrissur district.

== Notable performances ==
Under the guidance of Hymavathy, Daivadasakam, written by Narayana Guru was visualized in the form of Mohiniyattam by 1500 dancers.

== Works on her ==
Mohanam and Cholkettu are two documentaries made about Hymavathy and her dance career.

== Awards and honours ==
- Sangeet Natak Akademi Award
- Kerala Sangeetha Nataka Akademi Gurupooja Award 2007
- Kerala Sangeetha Nataka Akademi Award 2016
- Kaladarpanam Award
- Lasyamohini Award from Kerala Kalamandalam
