= Jayaprabha Menon =

Mohiniyattam dancer

Jayaprabha Menon ജയപ്രഭ മേനോൻ
- Born: Jayaprabha T.K; 27 November 1967 (age 58); Calicut, Kerala, India
- Occupation: Indian classical dancer
- Years active: 1971–present
- Spouse: Jayaprakash Menon
- Children: Radhika Menon & Jaikishen Menon
- Parent(s): Kuzhipat Vijayaraghavan & Rugmini Vijayaraghavan
- Awards: Kerala Sangeetha Nataka Akademi Award (2015)
- Website: www.jayaprabhamenon.com

Jayaprabha Menon is a Mohiniyattam dancer from New Delhi, India. Born and brought up in Kozhikode (Calicut), Kerala, later settled in New Delhi, India. She completed her education at Providence Girls High School, Calicut; Malabar Christian College and MES Women's College.

== Biography ==
At the age of 4, she was initiated into Bharatnatyam under the tutelage of Guru Kalamandalam Saraswathi at Nrityalaya, Kozhikode, where she was further trained in Mohiniyattam & Kuchipudi. At a very young age she started performing solo and participated in state and national-level competitions, following which she was selected to be a representative from Kerala for the Festival of India in the USSR in 1987. She was also the recipient of a senior scholarship from the Government of India, with a one-year extension for her excellence in performance. She was graded from Doordarshan Kendra, Thiruvananthapuram, Kerala, for both Bharatnatyam and Mohiniyattam in the year 1987. During these times she started presenting full-length performances of Bharatnatyam, Mohiniyattam, and Kuchipudi with live music organized by Tapasya, Lions Club, and The Rotary Club, to name a few, for fundraising and charitable causes. She was married to Jayaprakash Menon, a Hindustani vocalist, in the year 1990 and moved to Vadodara, Gujarat. After the marriage she got a chance to learn Bharatnatyam under the guidance of Bharatnatyam dancer, academician, dance scholar, composer, and choreographer C. V. Chandrasekhar, the Dean of Maharaja Sayajirao University of Baroda, Gujarat. In the year 1993, she moved back to Calicut, Kerala, along with her family. She was introduced to Sopana Sangeetham Mohinyattam by Padma Shri Bharati Shivaji and continued under her guidance for four years. Further, she was groomed and mentored by eminent theatre personality and scholar Padma Bhushan Kavalam Narayana Panicker, who gave her the courage and confidence to explore more into the regional fervor and present contemporary themes within the frame of Mohiniyattam. She is known for her graceful Nritta and aesthetic presentation. She is one of the foremost dancers, who has done innovative choreographic works in Mohiniyattam. She achieved many recognitions for her dance career.

== Notable dance performances ==
- 2000- Laya Lahari, Kathakali & Mohiniyattam combination

== Awards and recognitions ==
- 2015- Kerala Sangeetha Nataka Akademi Award
- 2005- Empanelled Artist of ICCR
