= A. K. Sukumaran =

Indian playback singer (1938–2018)

A.K. Sukumaran (1938 – 17 May 2018) was an Indian playback singer who worked mainly in Malayalam cinema.

== Early life ==
Sukumaran was born in 1938 in Thalapp, Kerala. He is best known for the song "Mani Mukile" with S. Janaki from a movie from 1965.

== Career ==
In 1954 he sang for the first time for Kozhikode Akaswani. He was active in many stage shows and sang for few movies. Sukumaran recorded 22 song with the His Master's Voice label and sang also light music and non-film songs. He has performed in over 1000 stage shows in Kerala and outside and was known for his charismatic performance and presence.

== Death ==
Sukumaran died on 17 May 2018 at the age of 80.

== Awards ==
- Kerala Sangeetha Nataka Akademi Award (1999)
