= Chandramana Govindan Namboothiri =

Indian artist

Chandramana Govindan Namboothiri was a Kathakali artist from the South Indian state of Kerala.

== Personal life ==
C.G Namboothiri was born in Chandramana Illam, Asamannoor, to C.S. Govindan Namboodiri (After whom he was named) and mother Devaki Antharjanam. He has a wife and four sons.

== Kathakali ==
Govindan Namboothiri started learning Kathakali in 1947 under Kavunkal Chathunni Panikkar. After the 3 years study in Kerala he went to Darpana Academy of Performing Arts, Ahmedabad. Govindan Namboothiri also learnt under Kalamandalam Krishnan Nair and Mankulam Vishnu Namboothiri.

== Awards ==
- Kerala Sangeetha Nataka Akademi Award, 1994
- "Senior Fellowship" for the research on 'Ilakiyattam' from Dept of Human Resources, 1997–1998
- Awarded "Thulasivanam" award for classical arts, 1999

== See also ==
- Kathakali
- Kalamandalam Krishnan Nair
- Kerala Kalamandalam
