= V. V. Subrahmanyam =

Indian violist

Kalaimamani V. V. Subrahmanyam
- Born: Vadakkencheri Veeraraghava Subrahmanyam; 1944 (age 81–82); Ernakulam, Kerala, India
- Occupations: Violinist, composer, academic
- Years active: 1960s–present
- Known for: Carnatic violin performance
- Awards: Sangeet Natak Akademi Award (2005); Kalaimamani(1993); Kerala Sangeetha Nataka Akademi Award (1988)

V.V.Subrahmanyam, commonly known as VVS (born 1944), is an Indian violist, composer, and academic. Regarded as one of the best violinist in carnatic music.

== Early life ==
VVS was born as Vadakkencheri Veeraraghava Subrahmanyam in 1944 in Ernakulam, Kerala.

VVS received his early education from his father. He received further training from Carnatic music violinists such as Tripunithura Narayana Iyer, Chembai, Musiri Subramania Iyer, and Semmangudi Srinivasa Iyer.

== Career ==
In 1966, VVS performed on the violin at the United Nations General Assembly with T. K. Murthy and M. S. Subbulakshmi..Between 1978 and 1982, VVS was a professor of violin at the Tamil Nadu Government Music College. He has also taught at Wesleyan University in the United States and some universities in Europe.

== Awards and recognition ==
- 1993: Received title of Kalaimamani Award by the Government of Tamil Nadu, which is the highest state honour in the field of Arts.
- 1988: Received the Kerala Sangeetha Nataka Akademi Award
- 2005: Received the Sangeet Natak Akademi Award.
