= Madambi Subramanian Namboodiri =

Indian Kathakali exponent

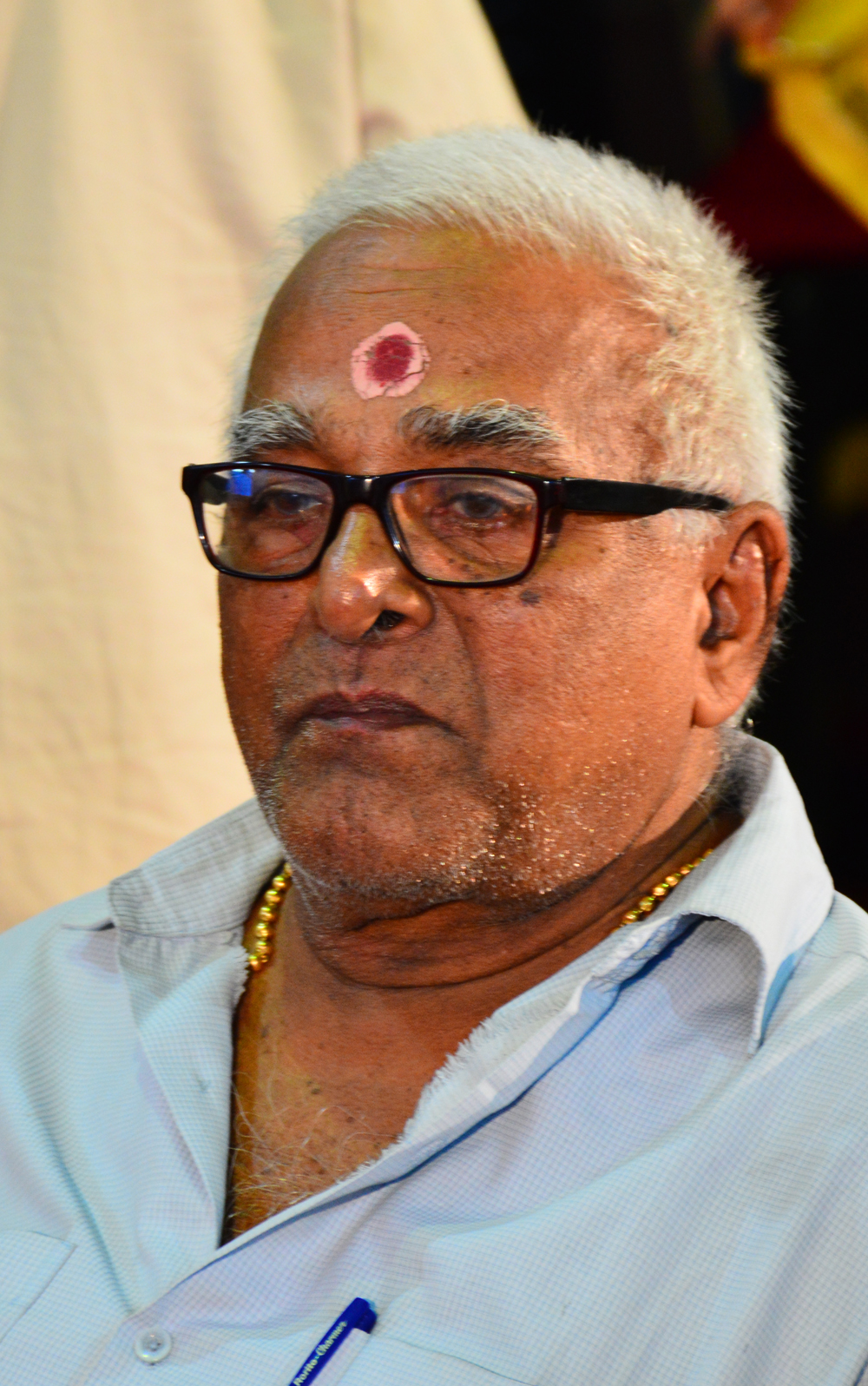
- Born: 1943 (age 82–83); Sreekrishnapuram, Palakkad district, British India
- Occupation: Kathakali musician
- Spouse(s): Parvati Antharjanam, Arya Devi Antharjanam
- Children: 3
- Parent(s): Sankaran Namboodiri, Sridevi Antharjanam

Madambi Subramanian Namboodiri is a Kathakali musician from Kerala, India. He received several noted awards including the Sangeet Natak Akademi Award, Kerala State Kathakali Award, Kerala Sangeetha Nataka Akademi Award and Kerala Kalamandalam Award.

== Biography ==
Subramanian Namboodiri was born in Madambi Manai in Sreekrishnapuram village of Palakkad district in 1943 to Sankaran Namboodiri and Sridevi Antharjanam.

As a child, Madambi wanted to study music and started studying music at Poomully Manai. Chembai Vaidyanatha Bhagavathar, Kongorpilli and Ramankutty Warrier were the main teachers at Poomully that time. After studying at Poomully for two months, he joined Kalamandalam in 1957 to study Kathakali music. Kalamandalam Neelakantan Nambeesan, Kalamandalam Sivaraman Nair and Kavungal Madhava Panicker were his teachers at Kalamandalam. His classmates were Kalamandalam Sankaran Empranthiri, Tirur Nambissan and Kalamandalam Hyderali. After completing 8-year course at Kalamandalam, he joined as a trainee-instructor at Perur Gandhi Sevas Sadanam for a while and then joined Kalamandalam in 1969 as Kathakali music instructor.

Madampi is an artist who has remained steadfast in the tradition of Kathakali music, and is known for his efforts to preserve the distinctive purity of Kathakali music by resisting the extreme progressivism in Kathakali music. His classmates Empranthiri and Hyderali reached the pinnacle of fame by leading great changes in Kathakali music. Although Madambi does not agree with such modifications or practices, he has the respect of all of them as unique artists.

After retiring from Kalamandalam in 1998, he settled in Cheruthuruthy, Thrissur district. He has two children, Shashi and Narayanan, by his first wife, the late Parvati Antharjan. After the death of his first wife, he married Arya Devi Antharjanam. They have a daughter, Sangeetha.

== Awards and honors ==
- Sangeet Natak Akademi Award 2017
- Kerala State Kathakali Award 2018
- Kerala Sangeetha Nataka Akademi Award 2010
- Kerala Kalamandalam Award
- Pattikkamthodi Ravunni Menon Smaraka Puraskaram
