= Kalamandalam Gangadharan =

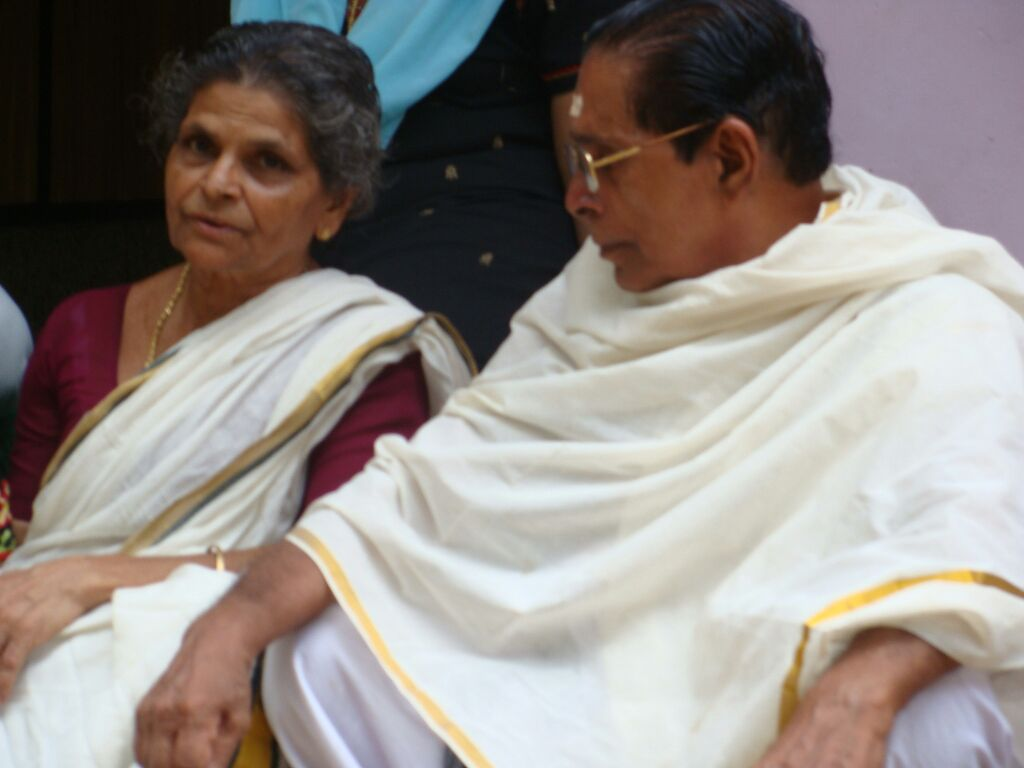
- Kalamandalam Gangadharan

Background information
- Born: Gangadharan; 26 June 1936
- Died: 25 April 2015 (aged 78)
- Genres: Kathakali
- Occupation: Singer

Kalamandalam Gangadhran (26 June 1936 – 26 April 2015) was a Kathakali musician from Kerala. His unique tenor and accent has earned him a large audience both within and outside Kerala. He was the most prominent disciple of Kalamandalam Neelakandan Nambeesan, and the Master of the many later generations of Kathakali Musicians. He was a visiting professor at Margi, an organization dedicated to the revival of Kathakali and Kutiyattom, two classical art forms of Kerala. In 2006, he was honoured by the Sangeet Natak Akademi Award. Aasan is a documentary film made on the musical life of the Kathakali of Kalamandalam Gangadhran directed by Ratheesh.

== Education and later life ==
After completing the basics of Carnatic music, he joined Kerala Kalamandalam at the age of 17. He started teaching at Kerala Kalamandalam immediately after finishing his courses. Kalamandalam Gangadharan was among the first students who completed the course of Kathakali music from Kalamandalam. He was also trained under the great Kathakali musician Mundaya Venkita Krishna Bhagavathar for three months. Soon after, at 24, he became a teacher at his alma mater. In 1991, he retired from kalamandalam as its vice principal. He was nicknamed as Asan (meaning 'The master') by his students and followers.

During his lifetime, he performed and showcased many kathakali presentations all over Kerala, and many foreign countries including Japan, America, Australia, China, Fiji, Indonesia and Iran.

== Awards ==
In 2006, Kalamandalam Gandharan received the prestigious Sangeet Natak Academy Award from the then-President of India, A.P.J.Abdul Kalam. He has received the Kerala Sangeetha Nataka Akademi Award (1998), Kalamandalam award, Guruvayoorappan award and many other awards. His unique tenor and accent has earned him a large fan base in and outside Kerala. He has served as a visiting professor at Margi.

== Death ==
Shri Kalamandalam Gangaharan died on 26 April 2015 at a private hospital in Kollam. He had been ailing for sometime. In the presence of hundreds of people, he was cremated with full state honours in the compound of his house.
