= Poothamkali =

Folk art form in Kerala, India

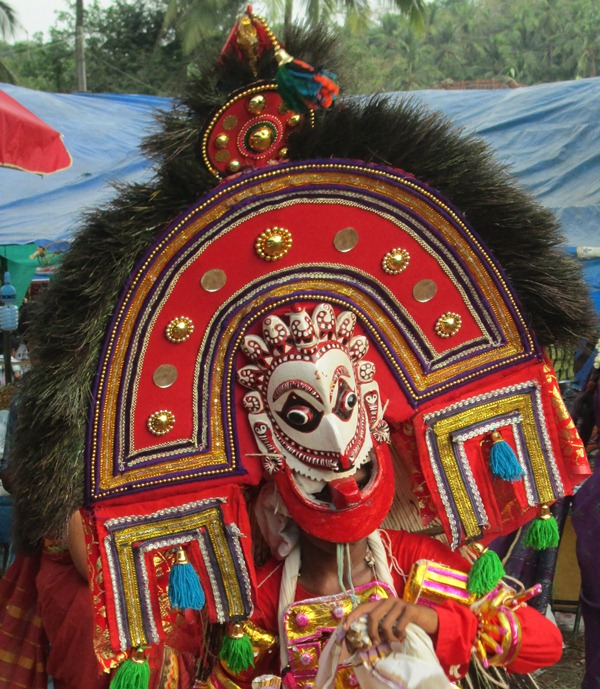
- Native name: പൂതംകളി
- Genre: Folk dance
- Origin: Kerala, India

Poothamkali is folk art form in the state of Kerala, India. This art form uses various types of decorations in the costume. It is usually performs in the Bhagavathy temples of Malappuram district. It is based on the myth of Durga and her combat with Darika.

== Performing ==
Poothamkali is performed with various footsteps. The performers who wears chilanka, an anklet uses for dance dances according to the rhythm of a musical instrument named thudi. The dancing is very slow at the beginning and then the pace increases. This needs a good body flexibility. Usually this art form is performed by Mannans, a community in Kerala.

== Costume ==
Poothamkali has diversity in costumes and ornaments used. The costume resembles to that of Kathakali. Peacock feathers, cloth, silk, canes, mirror, papers with various colours and bamboo are used for the decoration. The performers wears different ornament in neck and waist. They also wears special bangles with thorns in wrists and shoulders. This ornaments are wearing above a red cloth.

Peacock's feathers are used instead of hairs. They wears a crown along with a coloured mask made up of wood. In this mask the tongue is stretched outwards. This represents the anger and rage of Shiva's soldiers. The colourful crown is semicircular in shape. The performers wield a shield in their hand.
