= Thirra =

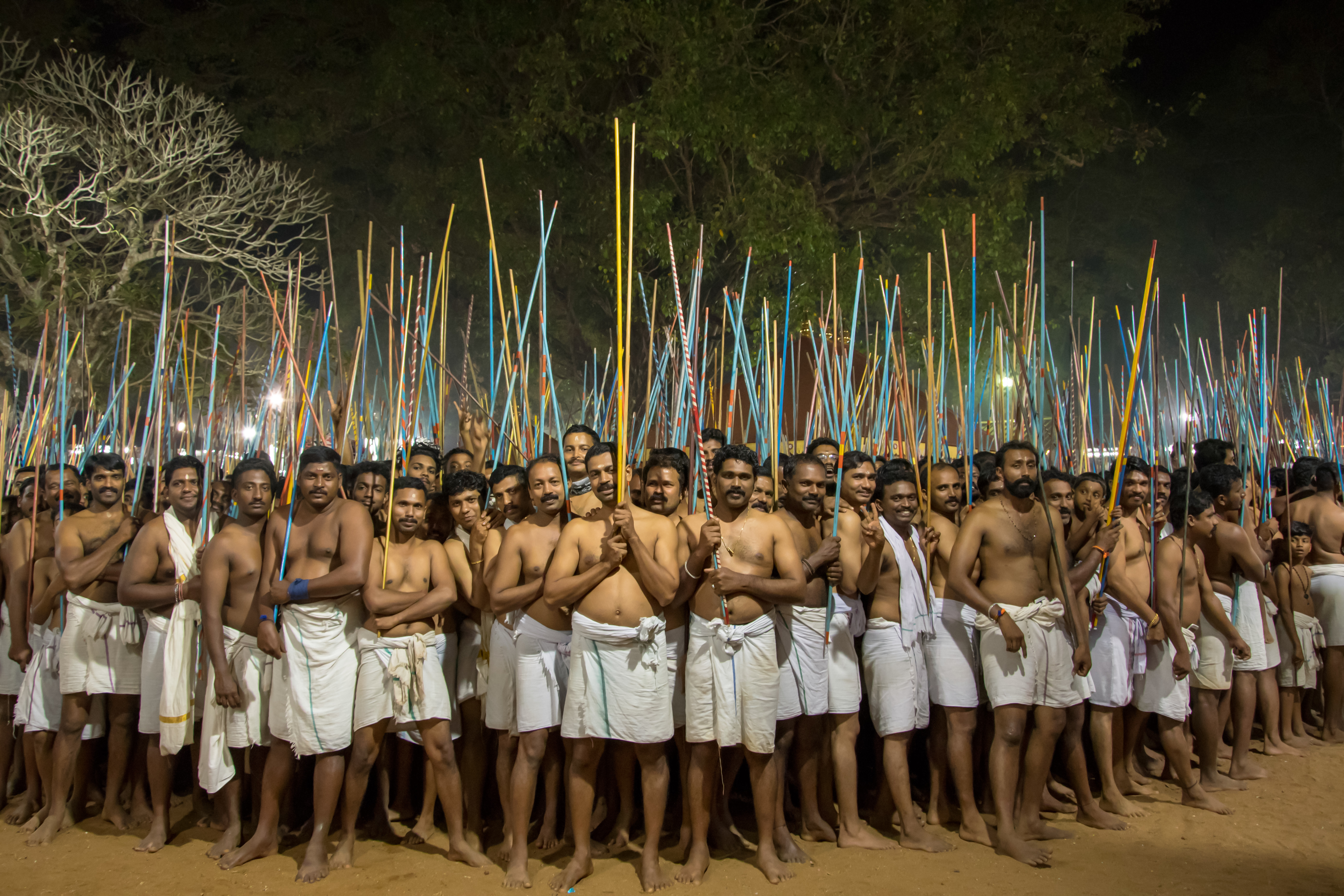
Thirra festival at a temple in North Kerala, India

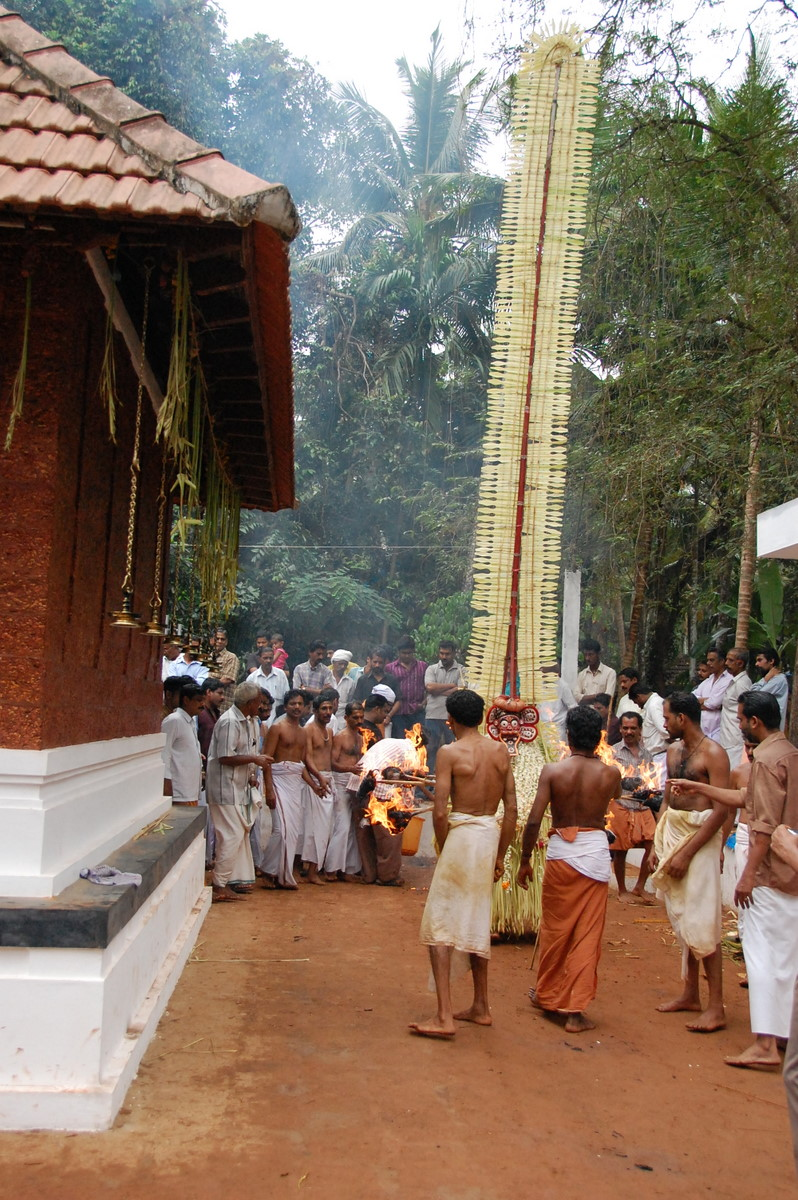
Kandakarnan thira

Thirra or Theyyam thira is a ritual dance performed in "Kaavu" (grove) and temples of the Malabar region in Kerala State, South India. This art form is performed by the artists of malaya (the artist who recognised for performing the art form called as a "perumalayan") community. This art is performed during Utsavam (annual temple festival). Clan deities such as Bhagavathi, Shiva are worshipped in these forms. It is usually celebrated from mid-December to mid-March, for a duration of 2–3 days in different temples, varying from temple to temple.

== Overview ==
Theyyam thira is main sub division of Theyyam. It is similar to the Theyyam dance performed in the same region, except that in Theyyam the performer is considered as the god he is representing, while in Thira the performer is considered as to be possessed by god.

Thira brings the gods to life. Performers dress up with ceremonial facial paint and loud clothing and dance in front of the deity, the bhagavathi. The objective clearly is to bring a sense of awe to the proceedings. Each performer represents a particular deity and is sponsored by devotees as a prayer offering. These dancers are viewed as being possessed by the gods when they are in their act, with devotees queuing up to meet them to share woes and wishes.

Toddy plays a very significant role in the proceedings, it is an offering to the gods and almost all the performers dance under the influence. This helps in creating the feeling of being "possessed". The performers belong to the "Peruvannan" caste, who are given prime importance in Thira. Therefore in Kerala, both Forward caste Brahmins, and backward caste and tribals have an important place in worship.
