= Painkulam =

- village
- Location in Kerala, India Painkulam (India)
- Coordinates: 10°44′15″N 76°18′45″E
- Country: India
- State: Kerala
- District: Thrissur

Population (2011)
  - Total: 9,517

Languages
  - Official: Malayalam, English
- Time zone: UTC+5:30 (IST)
- PIN: 679531
- Vehicle registration: KL- 48

Painkulam is a village in Panjal Grama Panchayat in Thrissur district in the state of Kerala, India. The village, situated on the shores of Bharathappuzha, is the birthplace of Late Raman Chakyar, who was a leader with a vision and a mission to the world of art. He taught the temple arts Koodiyattam and Chakyar Koothu to non Chakyar castes and democratized the art form.

Painkulam village has a government upper primary school, several preschool nurseries and a local library (Grameena Vayanasala).

An aqueduct, built in 1960s by the irrigation department, is a major attraction in the village.

Vazhalikkavu Temple is located in Painkulam, Kerala, near the Bharathapuzha River. The surrounding landscape includes forested areas and paddy fields. The temple's annual festival celebrates the birth of the presiding deity, Devi, and is observed by local residents. Decorated elephants are among the features of the festival. A traditional performance venue known as a Kootharangu is situated near the temple.

The limits of the village are Thozhuppadam, Killimangalam, Panjal and Cheruthuruthy villages.

Annual fest of Vazhalikkavu temple during February-March of every year is a major event in Painkulam. Short story writer Manoj Painkulam hails from this village. His works include Abhayasthanam, Kotterumakal, Muhammad Nabiyum Mustafayum, and Point Blank.

== Demographics ==
As of 2011 India census, Painkulam had a population of 9517 with 4551 males and 4966 females.
