= Ramanchakyar =

Indian artist

Painkulam Raman Chakyar
- Born: Raman Koypamahttam Chakyar; Painkulam, Trichur, Kerala, India
- Years active: 1905 - 1980
- Website: Painkulam Raman Chakyar

Painkulam Raman Chakyar was a Chakyar Koothu and Koodiyattam performer. He won the Kerala Sangeetha Nataka Akademi Award in 1972. He was also a teacher of Vachika Abhinaya in both Chakyar Koothu and Koodiyattam.

== Life ==
Starting in 1925, he performed regular programmes in various temples and religious places spread all over Kerala. He is credited with first bringing this artform outside the temples and closer to general audiences. He directed, supervised, and participated in more than 100 Koodiyattam plays, which he edited and condensed for contemporary audiences while striving to maintain artistic integrity and authenticity. He had more than 1000 stage appearances in different roles, besides being a regular participant in All India Radio programmes.

He produced and staged the 2nd Act of Sakunthalam, 3rd Act of Nagananda and Jadayuvadhanam in Ascharyachoodamani. He also supervised and participated in the production of a colour documentary film on koodiyattam in 1974. The Prahasa named Bhagavadajjukam of Bodhayana was also one of his productions.

In 1980, he spread international awareness of "Chakyar Koothu" and Koodiyattam, by mentoring a few European students and facilitating them in leading his troupe on a European tour including Germany, France, and Poland, which was made possible by the Indian Council of Cultural Relations and their European counterparts.
