= Timila =

Indian percussion instrument

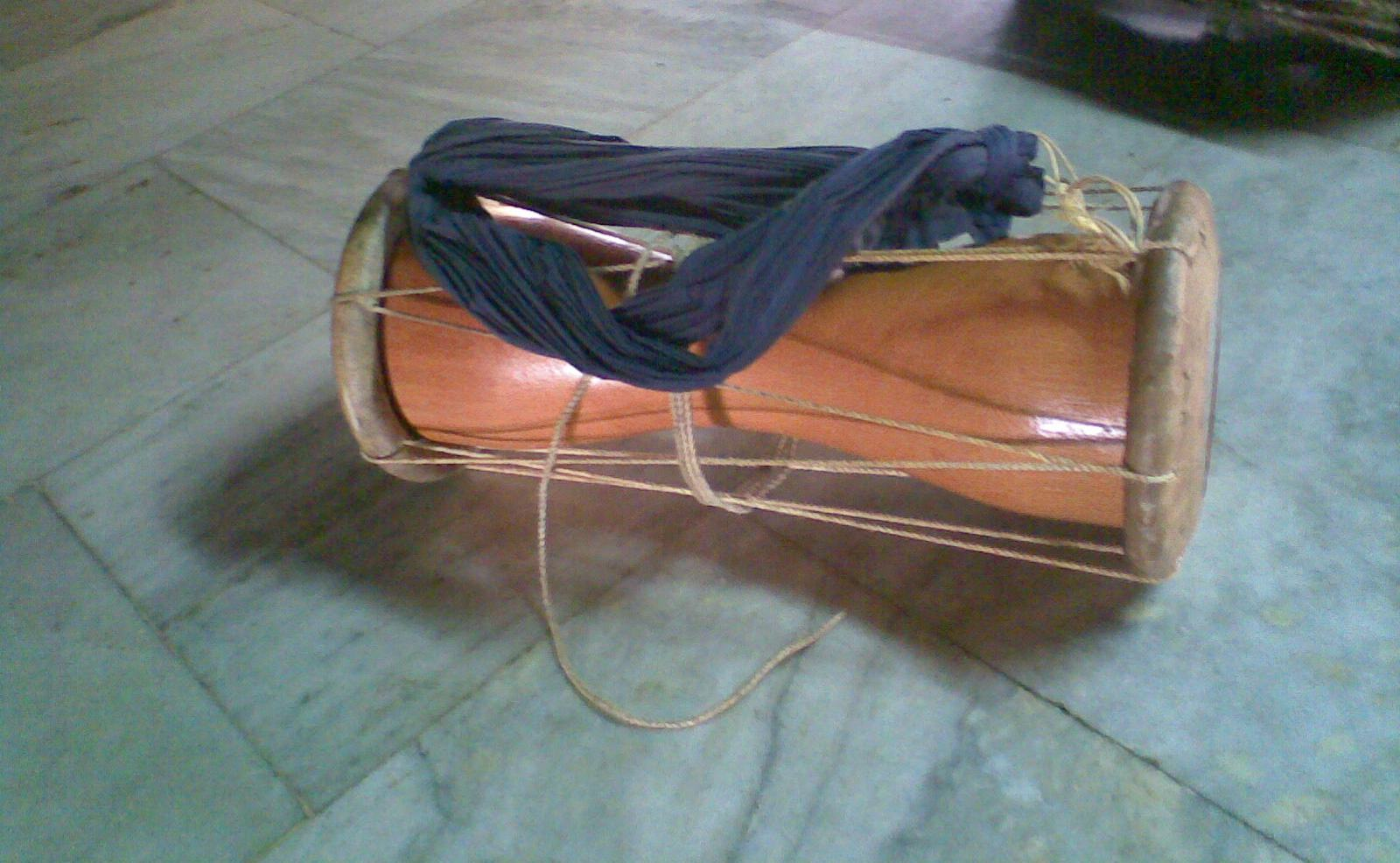
Timila

Timil, thimila or paani, (Malayalam:തിമില) is an hour-glass shaped percussion instrument used in Tamilnadu and Kerala in South India. It is a major percussion instrument used in sree-bali, sree-bhootha-bali and related temple rites. It is made of polished jackwood, and the drumheads made of calfskin (preferably taken from 1- to 2-year-old calf) are held together by leather braces which are also twined round the waist of the drum. This mechanism helps in adjusting the tension and controlling the sound, mainly two: 'tha' and 'thom'. It is one of the constituting instruments in Panchavadyam.
