= Gopika Varma =

Indian Mohiniyattam dancer

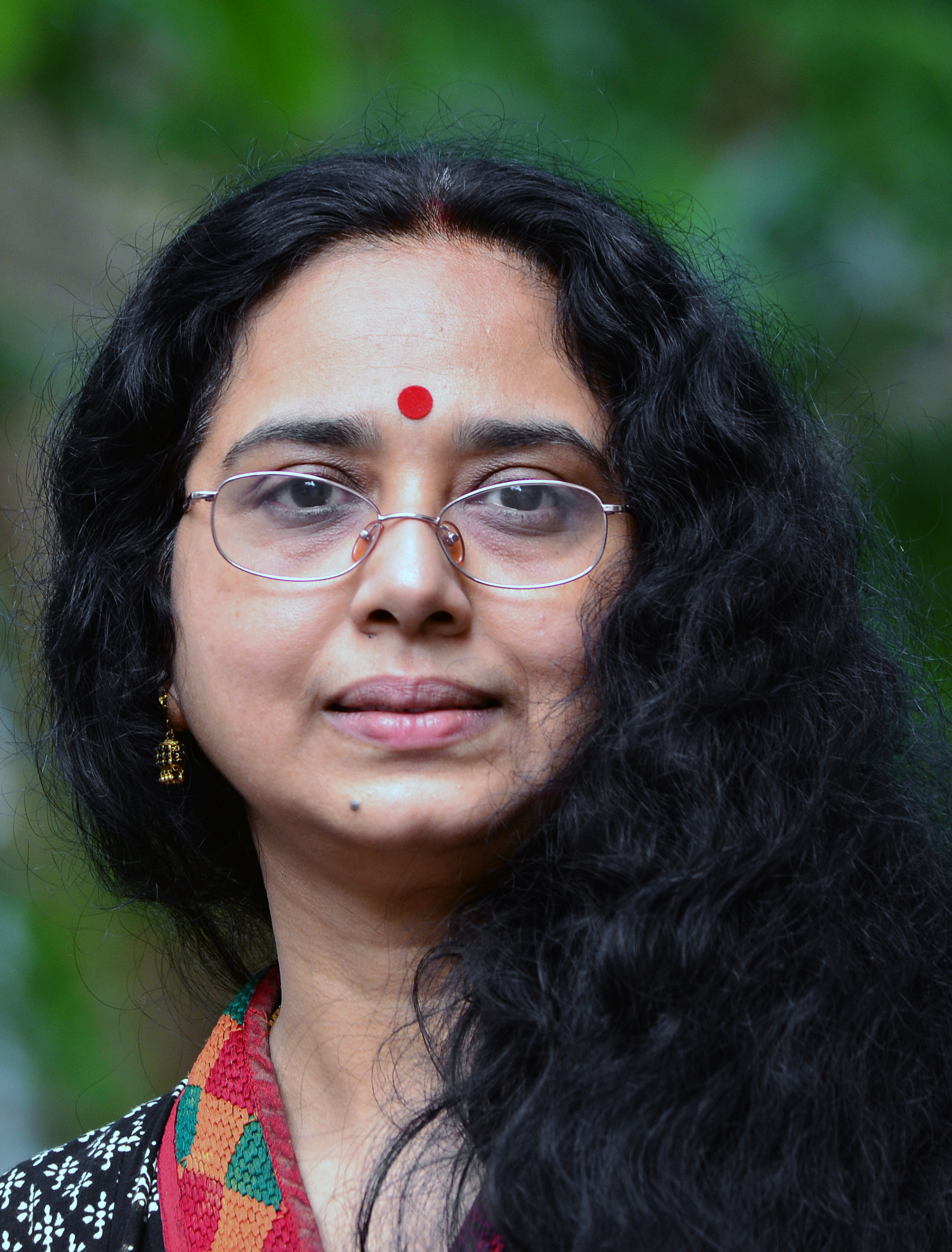
- Born: Gopika Gopal; Thiruvananthapuram, Kerala
- Occupations: Dancer, Dance teacher
- Known for: Indian Classical Dance/ Mohiniyattam
- Spouse: Marthanda Varma
- Awards: Sangeet Natak Akademi Award (2018); Kerala Sangeetha Nataka Akademi Award (2008); Kalaimamani (2004)

Gopika Varma is a Kerala born Mohiniyattam dancer and dance teacher who is settled in Chennai, Tamil Nadu, India. She received several awards including Sangeet Natak Akademi Award, Kerala Sangeetha Nataka Akademi Award and Kalaimamani.

== Biography ==
Born and raised in Thiruvananthapuram, Gopika Varma migrated to Chennai from Kerala in 1995. She started learning dance at the age of three, from her mother. At the age of 10, Gopika started learning Mohiniyattam from Girija and Chandrika Kurup and later she received specialized training from Kalyanikutty Amma and her daughter, Sreedevi Rajan. Gopika learned the Abhinaya (acting) part of Mohiniyattam from Kathakali exponent Kalamandalam Krishnan Nair. She also studied Bharathanatyam under Vazhiyur Ramayyar Pillai, for 18 years.

Although her guru was Kalyanikutty Amma, Gopika Varma follows her own style in Mohiniyattam. She has also performed Mohiniyattam in Sopana style under Kavalam Narayana Panicker. She runs a Mohiniyattam Dance School in Adyar, Chennai under the name "Dasyam".

=== Personal life ===
Gopika Varma is married into the Travancore royal family, to Poorurttathi Thirunal Marthanda Varma, descendant of Travancore king Swathi Thirunal Rama Varma. Other than running a dance school, she runs a shelter home for the physically challenged and a textile unit for their work. She lives in her house Ramalayam in Adyar, Chennai.

== Notable dance performances ==
Gopika choreographed and performed dance named Ayonija Panchakanyaka, about five unborn virgins in Indian mythology. She has performed the poem Radhayevide written by Sugathakumari and composed by M. Jayachandran, in Mohiniyattam form. Yamini Reddy, Kritika Subramaniam, Gopika Varma and Suhasini together choreographed and performed the dance named Antaram. Chayamukhi is another dance performance she did. The dance performance on Indian mythological characters Kunti and Ahalya, done as part of the celebrations of the 150th birth anniversary of Rabindranath Tagore, was also notable. She is now doing a dance composition based on Shankaracharya's life.

== Awards and honours ==
- Sangeet Natak Akademi Award 2018
- Kerala Sangeetha Nataka Akademi Award 2008
- Kalaimamani 2004 She is the first dancer to receive Kalaimamani for Mohiniyattam.
- Nritya Choodamani Award 2010 from Krishna Gana Sabha
- Abhinaya Kala Ratna Excellence Award
- Sathya Abhinaya Sundaram 2007
- Kaladarpanam Award 2003
- Yuva Kala Bharathi award by Bharat Kalachar 2001. She is the first Mohiniyattam dancer to receive this award.
- Outstanding Performance Award by the House of Commons – London 2003
- Satya Abinaya Sundaram
- Natya Kala Vipanchee
- Rajakeeya Puraskaram
