= Keezhpadam Kumaran Nair =

Indian artist (1916–2007)

Keezhpadam Kumaran Nair (1916–2007), was a Kathakali artist from Kerala, India. Endowed and equipped with a life profile that also showed him to several traditional Indian performing arts other than Kathakali, his stage presentation infused a fresh breath into the four-century-old art form, thanks also to his broad and deep view about the Puranas (Indian mythology) that spurred from a constant pursuit of knowledge through reading books and engaging in talks with scholars.

Kumaran Nair was one of the few Kathakali artists to have directly interacted with allied art forms like Bharatanatyam from southern India, Kathak from Northern India, and Odissi from the Eastern Belt. He also had brief experience with Tamil cinema in his youthful days in Madras (Chennai). These experiences helped his acting-dancing techniques acquire a certain grand eclecticism that won him fans across Kerala and elsewhere. Kumaran Nair's style was a mix of intellect, imagination, and signature body language that took care not to breach or dilute the pure grammar of Kathakali.

A native of Vellinezhi, one of Kathakali's nerve centers in the Palakkad district, Kumaran Nair was primarily trained, from as early as the age of five, in the highly evolved Kalluvazhi style by Pattikkamthodi Ravunni Menon. His classmates at Kerala Kalamandalam included the legendary Kalamandalam Krishnan Nair (1914–1990). Upon completion of his studies, Kumaran Nair found the conditions in Kerala did not exactly promise a bright future for him as a Kathakali artiste.

Much to the sorrow of his guru Pattikkamthodi, Kumaran Nair shifted base to Madras, where he became a master of choreography by teaching dance (for songs) to Tamil cinema star Ranjan. During this span, Kumaran Nair also worked closely with actor and later Chief Minister of Tamil Nadu M. G. Ramachandran.

He soon returned to Kalamandalam as a teacher, where circumstances forced him to work with the dance section. An unhappy Kumaran Nair quit his alma mater. He later worked with several Kathakali schools like PSV Natyasangham, Kottakkal; Kalasadanam, Chunangad and Varanakkottu Kaliyogam, Payyannur; but his longest stints were in Gandhi Seva Sadan (Sadanam Kathakali and Classical Arts Academy) at Peroor in Palakkad district and the International Centre for Kathakali in New Delhi. Kumaran Nair is a recipient of the Padma Shri award (2004), the Central Sangeet Natak Akademi award, the Kerala Sangeetha Nataka Akademi Award (1976), the Kerala Sangeetha Nataka Akademi Fellowship (1996) and the Kalamandalam award, among others.

Kumaran Nair retired from stage in 2004, three years before his death in 2007. After retirement, he led a reclusive life in a quiet, northern corner of his native Vellinezhi.
