= Kapila Venu =

Indian artist (born 1982)

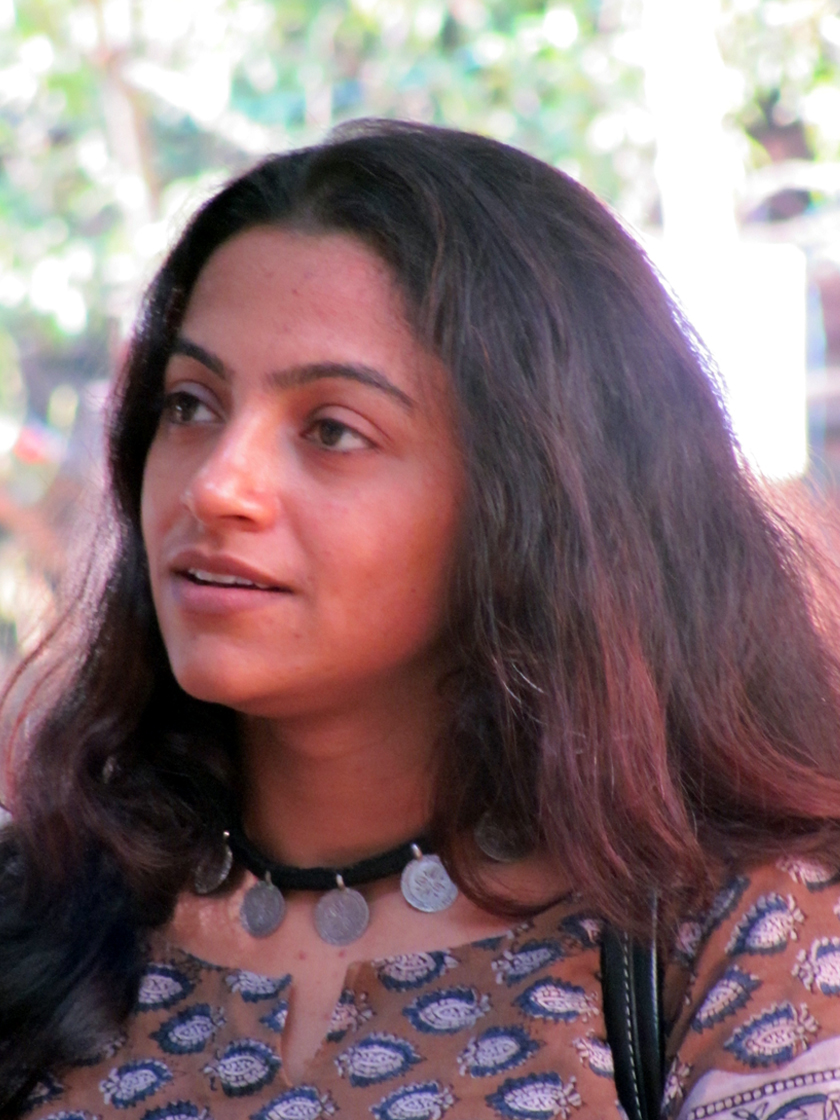
- Kapila Venu
- Born: 3 February 1982 (age 44); Kothamangalam, Kerala
- Occupations: Koodiyattam, Nangiar koothu dancer
- Parents: G. Venu (father); Nirmala Paniker (mother)
- Awards: Kumar Gandharva Samman (2017); Ustad Bismillah Khan Yuva Puraskar (2006); Kerala Sangeetha Nataka Akademi Award (2025)

Kapila Venu is an Indian dancer and actress. She specializes in the Kerala dance forms of koodiyattam and nangiar koothu. She received many awards including the Kumar Gandharva Samman by the government of Madhya Pradesh, Ustad Bismillah Khan Yuva Puraskar from the Sangeet Natak Akademi, Government of India and Kerala Sangeetha Nataka Akademi Award from Kerala Sangeetha Nataka Akademi, Government of Kerala.

== Biography ==
Kapila Venu was born on 3 February 1982, at Kothamangalam in Kerala. She is the only daughter of G. Venu, a Koodiyattam artist and director of the Irinjalakuda Natana Kairali, and Nirmala Paniker, an artist and researcher of Mohiniyattam. Kapila spent her childhood at two places: the Lawrence School, Lovedale, where her mother taught, and the 'Natana Kairali', founded by her father in Irinjalakuda, Thrissur district, for the promotion of ancient Kerala arts.

At Irinjalakuda, at the age of seven, Kapila started learning basics of Koodiyattam under Usha Nangiar, and then detailed training under Ammannur Madhava Chakyar, for nearly 10 years in the gurukula tradition. Later, her father Venu G and mother Nirmala Panicker became her gurus. It was her father's advice, supervision and discipline that helped her refine the skills she had learned under Ammannur and make her a performer. At the art school founded by her father, Natana Kairali, she trained under gurus like Kavungal Chathunni Panicker, Keezhpadam Kumaran Nair, and Kalamandalam Ramankutty Nair. She studied Mohiniyattam under her mother Nirmala Panicker. Kalaripayattu was taught by Balan Gurukkal. She also studied under Japanese dancer Min Tanaka for six years. Later, she has performed in two of his choreographies, Rite of the Forest (2005) and Thottangal (2007).

== Career ==
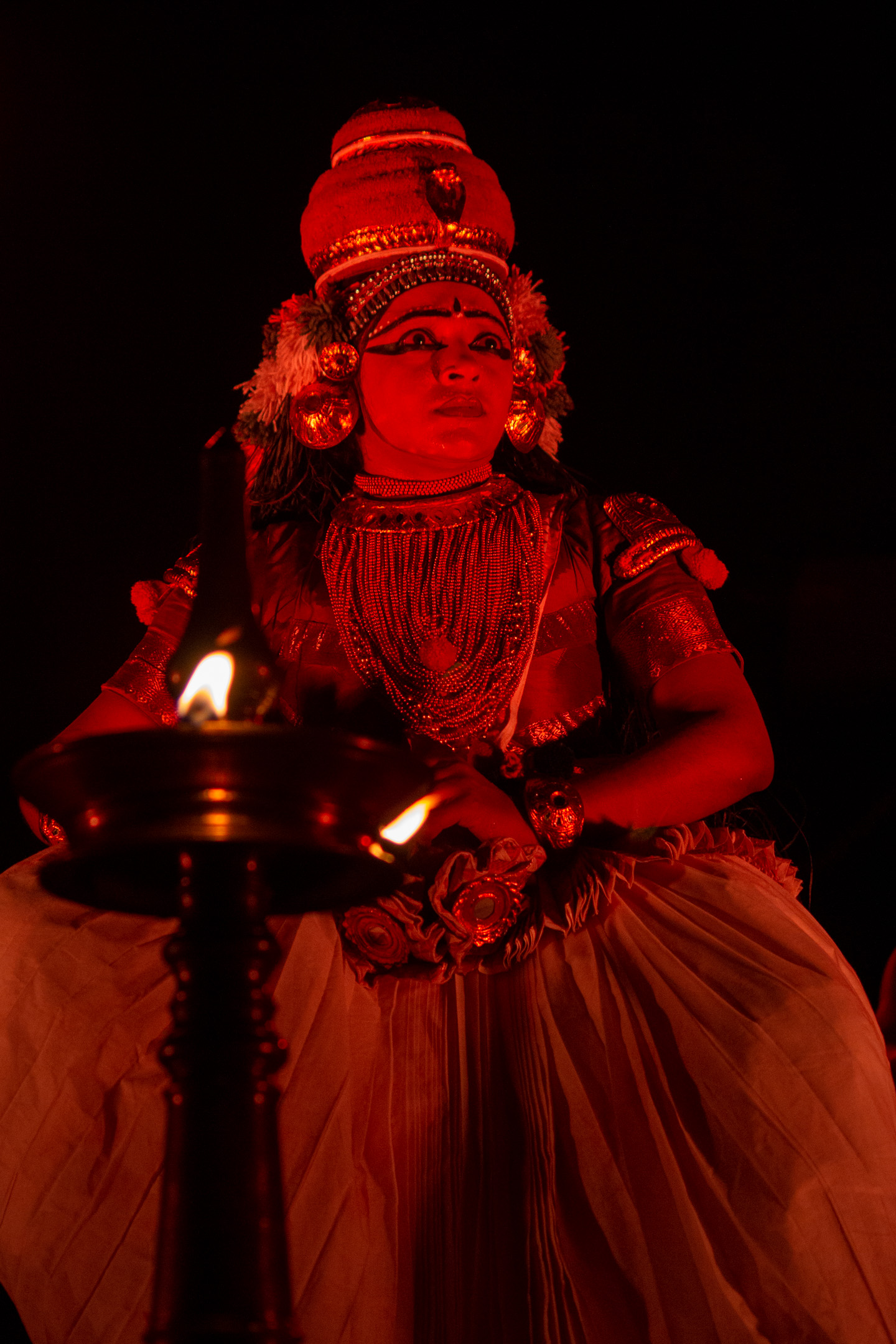
Kapila during a Koodiyattam performance

Kapila has performed mostly in Europe and Japan, including performances in Sweden, France, Italy, Switzerland, Germany, and Austria. Kapila was only six and a half years old when she performed a Kootiyattam role on a stage in England. She was only 17 when she performed a full-length Kootiyattam role in Sweden. She is also a non-traditional performer of Nangiar koothu. She was also a part of a multi-year eight-part project titled The Set Up, directed by dancer-choreographer duo Wally Cardona and Jennifer Lacey, at the Lower Manhattan Cultural Council Art Center in New York. She also participated in the World Theatre Project led by Peter Oskarson.

Kapila choreographed and performed Koodiyattam in the film 'Meghadoot', written and directed by Rahat Mahajan. She is the first to perform the story of Tamil folk hero Madurai Veeran in the Nangyar koothu style. In her dance performance titled Parvati Viraham (Parvati's longing), Kapila Venu integrates her feminist politics into this traditional art.

Kapila, the director of the Natanakairali Research and Performing Centre for Traditional Arts, is also a visiting faculty at the National School of Drama and the Intercultural Theatre Institute in Singapore.

== Awards and honors ==
In 2017 Kapila received the Kumar Gandharva Samman by the government of Madhya Pradesh. She has also received the Yuva Kalabharti Award from Bharat Kalachar in Chennai, the Sanskriti Award from the Sanskriti Pratishthan in Delhi, and the Ustad Bismillah Khan Yuva Puraskar from the Sangeet Natak Akademi for the year 2006. In 2025 March, she received Kerala Sangeetha Nataka Akademi Award from Kerala Sangeetha Nataka Akademi, Government of Kerala.

== Works on her ==
Kapila a documentary film directed by Sanju Surendran explores the life and work of Kapila Venu. It won the National Award for Best Cultural Film at the 62nd National Film Awards.
