= Kalamandalam Prabhakaran =

Kalamandalam Prabhakaran is an Indian dancer.

== Early life ==
He hails from the family of late Malabar Raman Nair, who made priceless contributions towards the aesthetic enhancement of Thullal as a performing art. He was born in 1945 to Makkamma and Kunjambu Nair. He was inspired by his paternal uncle Malabar Raman Nair and left conventional academic studies. In 1964, he completed the diploma course in Thullal, at the Kerala Kalamandalam, under the Kalamandalam Divakaran Nair and Vadakkan Kannan Nair. Later he mastered all the basic lessons in Baratanatyam under the tutelage of Natanam Sivapal and in Parayan Thullall, under Vechur Thakamani Pillai.

== Career ==
Thullal Thrayam is an experiment combining three traditional art forms led by Kalamandalam Prabhakan. Thullal Thrayam' combined three classical thullal art forms - Ottan Thullal, Seethankan Thullal and Parayan Thullal.

== Award ==
- 1996 – Kerala Sangeetha Nataka Akademi Award
