= Aparna Nangiar =

Indian Koodiyattam performer

- Born: Kerala, India
- Occupations: Koodiyattam and Nangiarkoothu performer; Sanskrit scholar
- Known for: Nangiarkoothu
- Awards: Ustad Bismillah Khan Yuva Puraskar (2023)

Aparna Nangiar is an Indian performer of Koodiyattam and its solo female offshoot, Nangiarkoothu, from Kerala. She was born into the Ammannur family of Koodiyattam performers and holds a doctorate in Sanskrit. She received the Ustad Bismillah Khan Yuva Puraskar from the Sangeet Natak Akademi for 2023 for her contribution to Koodiyattam.

== Early life and training ==
Aparna Nangiar was born into the Ammannur family, known for its practitioners of Koodiyattam, an ancient Sanskrit theatre tradition of Kerala, and began learning the art at the age of seven. She trained at the Ammannur Chachu Chakyar Smaraka Gurukulam in Irinjalakuda, Thrissur district, and studied under the Nangiarkoothu exponent Usha Nangiar. She completed an M.Phil and a PhD in Sanskrit, saying a command of the language is essential to Koodiyattam because of its reliance on dialogue, or vachikabhinaya.

== Career ==
As of 2019, Nangiar worked as an assistant professor of Sanskrit at Sree Sankara College in Kalady while continuing to teach and perform Koodiyattam.

Alongside Koodiyattam, she performs Nangiarkoothu, a solo female performance form dating to around the 10th century that draws its stories from the Sree Krishna Charitam. Her repertoire includes Kamsa Vadham, an excerpt from Sree Krishna Charitam Nangiarkoothu depicting the nirvahana (pre-story recital) of a maid character from the play Subhadradhananjayam. In August 2021 she presented Dasamam Koothu, a rare ritual variant of Nangiarkoothu performed as part of a Vedic sanjayanam ceremony, at a private residence in Kodakara, Thrissur district, having previously presented the same form seven years earlier.

In 2021, Nangiar took part in the International Koodiyattam and Kathakali Festival in Dubai, giving lectures and demonstrations on the history and structure of Koodiyattam. Her practice and teaching are the subject of The Nangiarkoothu Artist (2020), a short documentary directed by Deepa Nair that had its New York premiere in the Global Shorts Program at Film at Lincoln Center.

== Awards and recognition ==
In February 2024, the Sangeet Natak Akademi announced that Nangiar would receive the Ustad Bismillah Khan Yuva Puraskar for 2023.
