= G. Venu =

Indian dancer and research scholar (born 1946)

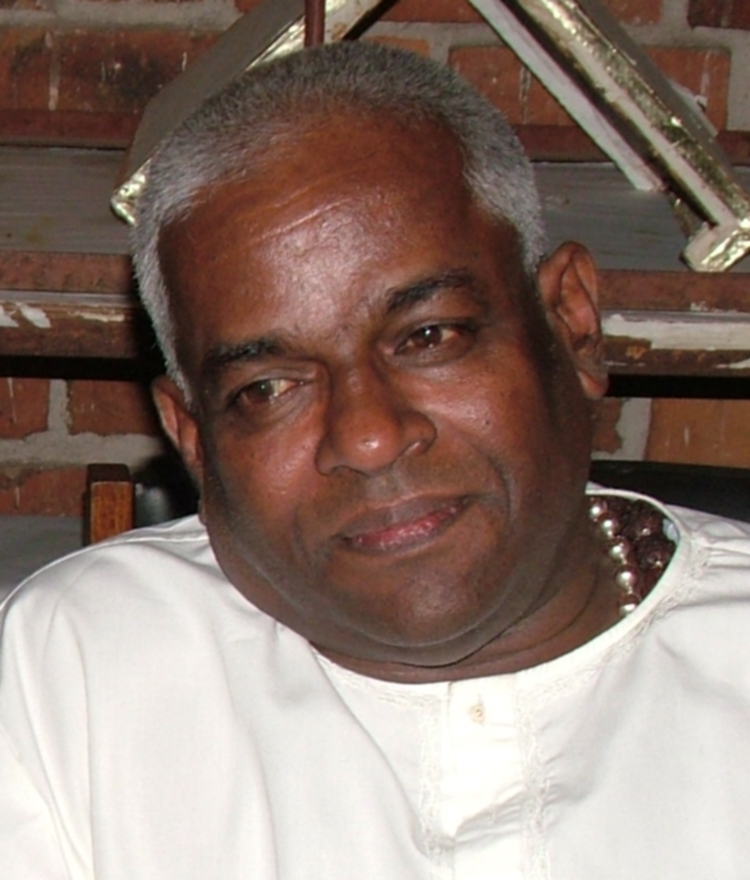
- Born: 1 July 1945 (age 81); Pappanamcode, Travancore, British India
- Other names: Gopalan Nair Venu, Venuji
- Occupations: Koodiyattam, Kathakali dancer, Reseach scholar
- Known for: Koodiyattam and Kathakali
- Spouse: Nirmala Paniker
- Children: Kapila Venu
- Parents: Chittore Gopalan Nair (father); Sumathy Kutty Amma (mother)
- Awards: Sangeet Natak Akademi Award (2023); Nikkei Asia Prize (2007); Kerala Sangeetha Nataka Akademi Award (2007); Kerala Sahitya Akademi Award (1977); Kerala Kalamandalam Fellowship (2024)

Gopalan Nair Venu popularly known as G. Venu (or Venu G. and affectionately Venuji) is a Koodiyattam and Kathakali exponent, choreographer and research scholar from Kerala, India. He received several awards and honors including Kerala Sangeetha Nataka Akademi Award, Kerala Kalamandalam Award, Nikkei Asia Prize for Culture, Kerala Sahitya Akademi Award and the Sangeet Natak Akademi Award for his overall contributions in the field of performing arts. Being first person from a caste lower than Chakyar to study Koodiyattam, he is also the first person from a non-Chakyar community to receive the Kerala Kalamandalam Fellowship for Koodiyattam.

== Biography ==
G. Venu was born on 1 July 1945, in Pappanamcode, in present-day Thiruvananthapuram district of Kerala to Chittore Gopalan Nair and Sumathy Kutty Amma. At the age of eleven, he started studying Kathakali from Keerickattu Sankar Pillai, and later done advanced studies from Guru Gopinath and Chengannur Raman Pillai. He was the first student to enroll at Viswakalakendram, the dance institute opened by Guru Gopinath at Vattiyoorkkavu, Thiruvananthapuram, in 1963. He studied Kathakali for three years under Keerikattu Sankaran Pillai and for five years under Guru Gopinath.

Venu, who studied Kathakali, came to Bhopal in 1966 to teach Kathakali for the Madhya Pradesh Kala Parishad. There, he got the opportunity to learn Kathak and Manipuri dance, in addition to instruments in Hindustani music.

Venu was attracted to Koodiyattam after seeing the performance of Ammannur Madhava Chakyar at the Sree Vadakkumnathan Temple in Thrissur. Following this, at the age of 37, he decided to study Koodiyattam, and resigned his permanent job at the School of Drama and Fine Arts under University of Calicut, moved to Irinjalakuda to join the Koodiyattam school of Ammannur, becoming the first non-Chakyar student there. He also trained in Koodiyattam from Ammannur Paremeswara Chakyar. Venu made his Arangeettam (first public performance after training) in Koodiyattam in 1984.

=== Personal life ===
G. Venu is married to Nirmala Paniker, a mohiniyattam exponent, and they have one daughter Kapila Venu.

== Contributions ==
It was during his Kathakali studies that Venu developed an interest in Mudras, the hand gestures of the Indian classical visual arts. Having done extensive research on the subject, he later created a sophisticated dance notation system to define mudra in Kerala visual arts, including Kathakali, Koodiyattam and Mohiniyattam. In 1977, the Kerala Sangeetha Nataka Akademi published his book, containing detailed descriptions of his 373 mudras, titled Kathakaliyile Kai mudrakal (Hand Signs in Kathakali), which was later translated into English in 1984 by Venu's own institution, Natana Kairali, under the title Mudras in Kathakali. In 1994, the Cultural Department of the Government of Kerala published a dictionary prepared by him containing details of 587 mudras used in Kathakali, titled Kathakali Mudra Nikhandu (meaning: Dictionary on Kathakali mudras). The 706 page book Mudra, published in 2023 contains 1341 notations of hand gestures used in Koodiyattam, Kathakali and Mohiniyattam performances. He has written 20 books on the techniques of the performing arts. The monograph on Tholpavakoothu was published by the Sangeet Natak Akademi.

Venu has also authored books like Into the World of Koodiyattam with the Legendary Ammannur Madhava Chakyar and Production of a play in Kutiyattam on Kutiyattam Mohiniyattam - The last dance on Mohiniyattam and Puppetry and lesser known dance traditions of Kerala.

Venu has also developed 'Navarasa Sadhana' module, a training methodology for actors, based on Navarasa in Natya Shastra as well as the indigenously developed actor training methodologies that evolved in Kerala, as a transformational process for artists seeking deeper insight into the depths and diversity of human emotions.

Venu and his guru Ammannur Madhava Chakyar were among the people who played a role in modernizing and popularizing Koodiyattam. Venu was the first to ask Ammannur to teach this art, which was performed only by the Chakyar community, to people from other communities, particularly lower. Ammannur agreed and made Venu his disciple. Through this, Venu became the first person to learn Koodiyattam from a community below the Chakyar community.

Venu was also among the people who took the initiative to present Koodiyattam, a temple art, on a public stage. It was with Venu's encouragement that Ammannur began performing outside traditional venues.

Venu is also credited with starting the Ammannur Chachu Chakyar Memorial Gurukulam, a Koodiyattam school based on the Gurukula system, in 1982. As a teacher he has trained several young actors at the School of Drama and Fine Arts under University of Calicut, the National School of Drama, New Delhi, InterCultural Theatre Institute, Singapore, and by conducting regular workshops. Venu also was nominated as one of the four honorary directors of the "World Theatre Project" in Sweden.

Venu is also the person responsible for the revival of many rare traditional art forms in Kerala. In 1975, he established a training and research center called 'Natanakairali' in Irinjalakuda to preserve the traditional art forms of Kerala that were on the verge of extinction. Noted examples include the revival of Pavakathakali, the Kathakali using puppets, and revival of Tholppava koothu. Other folk and ritualistic art forms that he had involved in revival include Kakkarissi Natakam, Padayani and Mudiyettu.

In recognition of his career, he was nominated to the Expert Committee of UNESCO's Asian Cultural Center. Koodiyattam was recognised by UNESCO in 2001 as a Masterpiece of the Oral and Intangible Heritage of Humanity. His contribution to receiving this recognition is significant. Another art form that gained more attention through his efforts and was later recognized by UNESCO is Mudiyettu.

== Major works ==
As a performer Venu has performed Kathakali and Koodiyattam in various venues across India and abroad. It was the performance at the Old Theater Project meeting in Oppenheim provided him the opportunity to represent India in Sweden.

Venu has directed many plays for Koodiyattam and Nangiakoothu. Koodiyattam adaptation of the Kalidasa's Shakuntala and Vikramōrvaśīyam, Bhāsa's Urubhanga and Dutavakya, Shudraka's Mṛcchakatika are highly noted. He also choreographed Nangiar koothu adaptations of Narasimhavathara, Sitaparityaga (the part of the Ramayana where Rama abandons Sita in the forest) and Saundarya Lahari. Through his adaptations he combine theatre with socio-political consciousness.

He was inspired to stage Mṛcchakatika in the form of a Koodiyattam after renowned theatre director Habib Tanvir requested him that he should also prepare Mṛcchakatika as Koodiyattam, after watching Abhijnanasakuntalam directed by Venu.

== Awards and honors ==
G. Venu received several awards and honors including Homi Bhaba Fellowship, DakshinaChitra Viruthu, Kerala Sangeetha Nataka Akademi Award by Kerala Sangeetha Nataka Akademi in 2007, Kerala Kalamandalam Award from Kerala Kalamandalam in 2005, Nikkei Asia Prize for Culture from Japan in 2007, and Kerala Sahitya Akademi Award by Kerala Sahitya Akademi in 1977. He won the Dancers and Choreographers Association's Nritha Paramacharya Award in 2022.

In 2023, he received the Sangeet Natak Akademi Award for his overall contributions in the field of performing arts. In 2024 February, he received the Kerala Kalamandalam Fellowship, becoming the first person from a non-Chakyar community to receive this honour in the field of Koodiyattam. He has also received the 2024 Vayosevana (meaning: senior citizens' service) Award for Comprehensive Contribution from the Department of Higher Education and Social Justice, Government of Kerala.

In 2023 October, Venu received the Nruthya Pitamaha (meaning: Great father in dance) title from the Urise Vedic Sangeetha Academy, Bangalore.
