= Nirmala Paniker =

Indian Mohiniyattam dancer (born 1944)

- Born: 12 February 1944 (age 82); Kovalam, Travancore
- Occupations: Mohiniyattam dancer, choreographer, teacher
- Known for: Contributions to Mohiniyattam, founding Natanakaisiki
- Spouse: G. Venu
- Children: Kapila Venu
- Awards: Sangeet Natak Akademi Award (2009)

Nirmala Paniker (born 12 February 1944) is an Indian Mohiniyattam dancer, choreographer, and teacher, known for her contributions to the preservation and development of the Mohiniyattam dance form. She is the founder of Natanakaisiki, a centre in Irinjalakuda, Kerala, dedicated to the training and promotion of Mohiniyattam and other traditional performing arts such as Koodiyattam and Nangiar Koothu. She received the Sangeet Natak Akademi Award in 2009 for her work in Mohiniyattam.

== Biography ==
Nirmala Paniker was born on 12 February 1944 in Kovalam, then part of Travancore, to Chellamma and Madhava Paniker. She began training in Mohiniyattam at the age of five under Guru Thottasseri Madhavan Paniker Asan and later under Kalamandalam Kalyanikutty Amma, a prominent Mohiniyattam exponent. She also trained in Bharatanatyam, Kathakali, and Carnatic music, which influenced her choreography and teaching.

=== Personal life ===
Nirmala Paniker is married to G. Venu, a Kathakali, Koodiyattam exponent, and they have one daughter Kapila Venu.

== Career ==
Nirmala established Natanakaisiki, the dance research and training wing of Natanakairali, which trains under Gurukulam system, founded in 1994, in Irinjalakuda, Kerala, to promote Mohiniyattam, Koodiyattam, and Nangiar Koothu. Her work focuses on reviving traditional elements of Mohiniyattam while introducing choreographies rooted in its indigenous vocabulary. She has choreographed notable works such as Geethagovinda Saptam, based on Jayadeva's Gita Govinda, and an adaptation of Sree Narayana Guru's Kundalini Paattu for Mohiniyattam.

Natanakairali has trained numerous dancers and staged performances that highlight the lyrical and expressive qualities of Mohiniyattam. Paniker’s choreography for productions like Radha-Madhavam and Krishnanattam has been noted for its adherence to traditional aesthetics while exploring new themes. Her performances have been described as embodying the grace and fluidity characteristic of Mohiniyattam. She has also authored a book on Mohiniyattam, which serves as a resource for understanding the dance form’s history and techniques.

== Awards and recognition ==
Nirmala Paniker was awarded the Sangeet Natak Akademi Award in 2009 for her contributions to Mohiniyattam. She has also been recognised for her efforts in promoting traditional dance forms through Natanakairali and her scholarly work on Mohiniyattam.
