= Margi Madhu =

Indian Koodiyattam exponent (born 1966)

Margi Madhu Chakyar
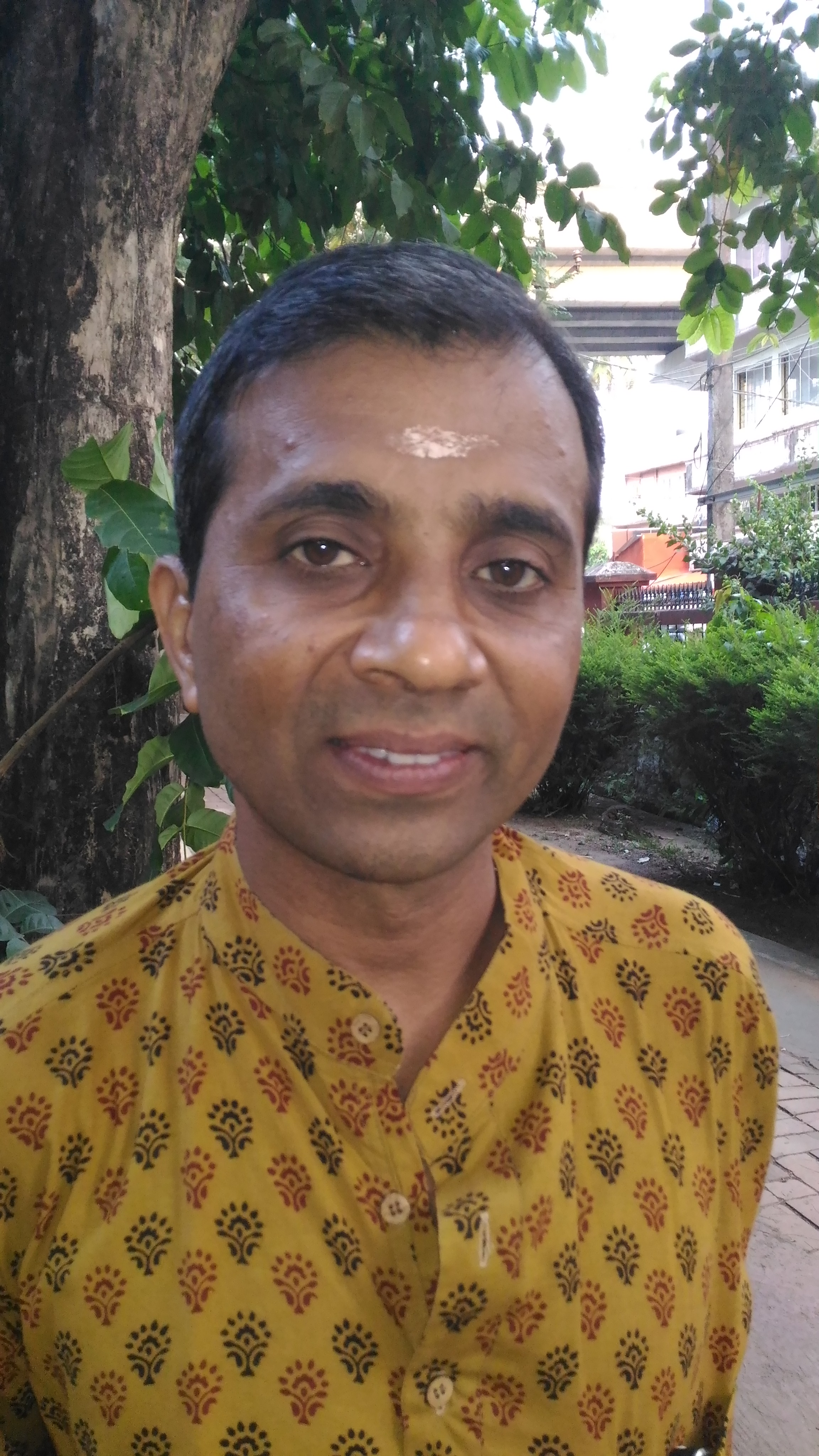
- Born: Madhu A.K; 19 May 1966 (age 60); Moozhikkulam, Ernakulam district, Kerala
- Occupations: Koodiyattam performer and teacher
- Known for: Koodiyattam performer and teacher
- Spouse: Indu G. Nair
- Children: Nepathya Sreehari Chakyar
- Parents: Moozhikkulam Kochukuttan Chakyar (father); Pothiyil Sulochana Illodamma (mother)
- Awards: Sangeet Natak Akademi Award (2022); Kerala Sangeetha Nataka Akademi Award (2011)

Madhu A.K popularly known as Margi Madhu or Margi Madhu Chakyar is an Indian Koodiyattam exponent and teacher from Kerala. He received several awards including the Kerala Sangeetha Nataka Akademi Award in 2011 and Sangeet Natak Akademi Award for his contribution to Koodiyattam in 2022.

== Biography ==
Madhu was born on 19 May 1966, to Moozhikkulam Kochukuttan Chakyar and Pothiyil Sulochana Illodamma at Moozhikkulam, Ernakulam district, Kerala. Born into a family of Koodiyattam artists, his father and paternal uncle Ammannur Madhava Chakyar are noted Kootiyattam exponents. He was educated at St. Mary's School, Moozhikkulam and N.S.S. High School, Ernakulam.

He began studying Koodiyattam under his father and later trained under uncle Madhava Chakyar, P.K. Narayanan Nambiar and M. Madhavanunni. In 1981, he joined the performing arts institute 'Margi' in Thiruvananthapuram. He, along with his brother Margi Narayana Chakyar and his father's nephew Margi Rama Chakyar, were the first Koodiyattam students in Margi.

=== Personal life ===
Madhu is married to Indu G. Nair from Edappally, Ernakulam. She is also a Koodiyattam and Nangiar koothu artiste for more than 20 years. They have one son, Srihari.

== Career ==
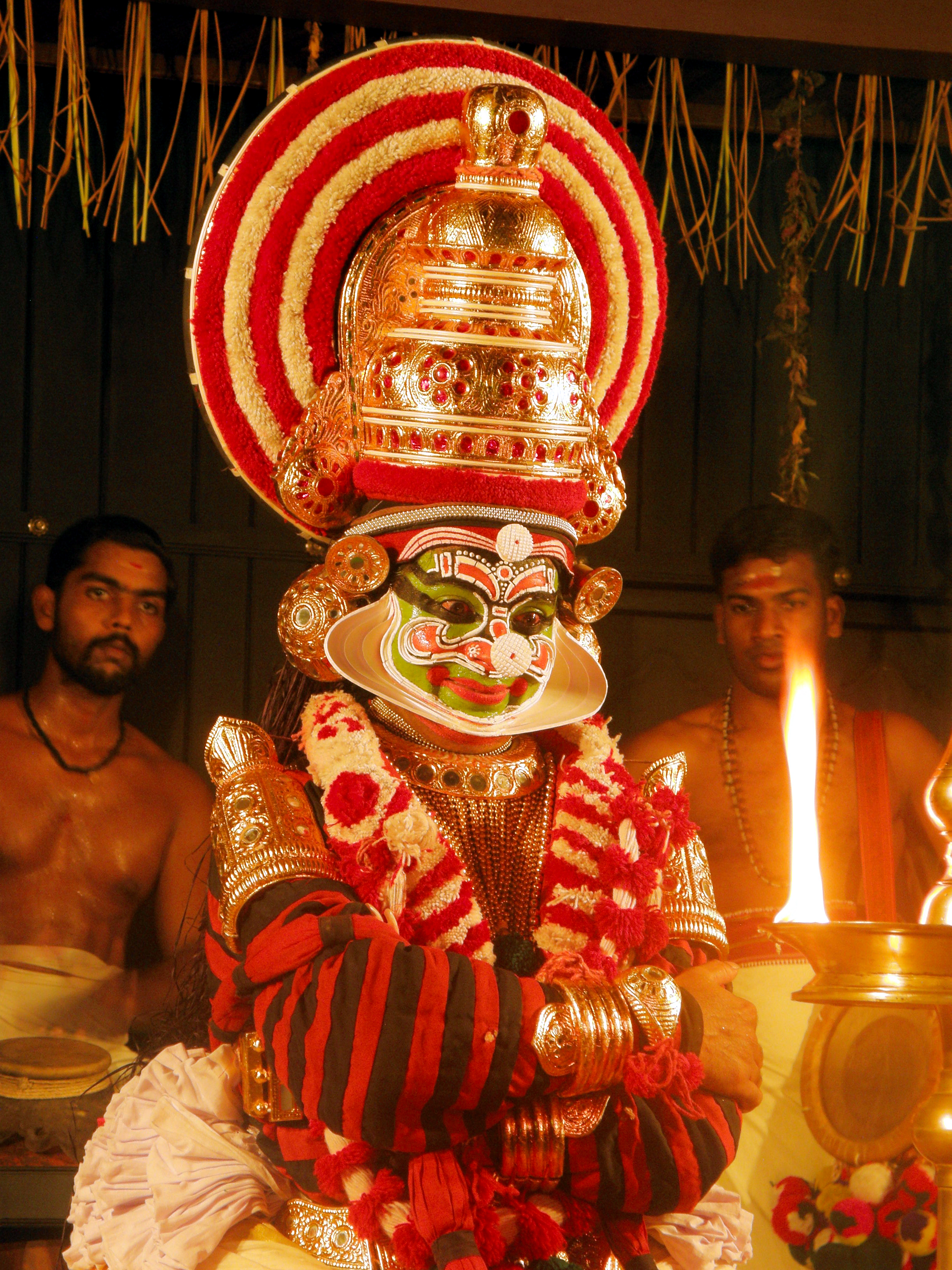
Margi Madhu as Ravana in a Kootiyattam play at Nepathya

Madhu has performed in various venues across India and abroad, including the John F. Kennedy Center for the Performing Arts in USA. He has performed roles such as Ravana, Arjuna, Sugriva and Vidushak in Koodiyattam plays.

Madhu has also written the acting manual for four Koodiyattam plays, Dooth Ghadodgajam, Kanchukeeyam, Karnabharam and Macbeth.

Madhu is an assistant professor of theatre at Sree Sankaracharya University of Sanskrit. He has also trained many students through the study centre 'Nepathya', which he founded in Moozhikkulam in 2003.

== Awards and honours ==
Madhu has received the Sanskriti National Award and the Junior Fellowship of the Human Resource Development Department, Government of India. In 2011, he received the Kerala Sangeetha Nataka Akademi Award for Koodiyattam. In 2022 he received Sangeet Natak Akademi Award for his contribution to Koodiyattam.
