= Moozhikkulam Kochukuttan Chakyar =

Actor (1928–2009)

- Born: 1928; Ammannur, Thrissur district, Kerala, India
- Died: 2009 (aged 80–81)
- Occupation: Koodiyattam performer
- Known for: Koodiyattam
- Children: Margi Madhu; Margi Sajeev Narayana Chakiar; Shailaja A K
- Awards: Padma Shri

Moozhikkulam Kochukuttan Chakyar (1928–2009) was an exponent of Koodiyattam, a traditional form of Sanskrit theatre from Kerala, which has been recognised by UNESCO as an Oral and Intangible Heritage of Mankind.

== Early life ==
Born in a family of Koodiyattam performers, in 1928, at Ammannur, a small hamlet near Irinjalakuda, in Thrissur district in the south Indian state of Kerala, Chakyar had his early training in the art form from within his family. Ammannur Madhava Chakyar, a renowned Koodiyattam performer and a Padmabhushan awardee, was his cousin and the two, later, would evolve a new school of performance, popularly known as the Ammannur tradition of Koodiyattam. When Margi, an institution promoting traditional art forms of Kerala, started their Koodiyattam training centre in 1981, he was the first residential guru. The institution imparted training to many aspiring performers which included two sons of Chakyar, Margi Sajeev Narayana Chakiar and Margi Madhu and both of them are known exponents of the art form. In 1998, Chakyar joined Nepathya, a centre for excellence in Kudiyattam, as the Mukhya Acharya (Head Teacher), and continued his association with the institution till his last. The Government of India awarded him the fourth highest civilian honour of the Padma Shri, in 2008, for his contributions to Arts. He died in 2009, at the age of 81. He is remembered by an annual festival, Guru Moozhikkulam Kochukuttan Chakyar Memorial Kutiyttam Festival, at Moozhikkulam, a suburb of Kochi where Nepathya is headquartered in, and through orations organised by Nepathya.

== See also ==
- Ammannur Madhava Chakyar
- Koodiyattam
- Mani Madhava Chakyar
