= Usha Nangiar =

Usha Nangiar is an Indian traditional dance performer. Usha performs Nangiarkoothu.

== Early life ==
Usha was born into a performing family in Kerala. She started at an early age of 10, first practicing Koodiyattam and then branching to Nangiarkoothu. In 1980, Usha joined the Koodiyattam training centre, Ammannur Gurukulam. She was the first girl to join the school.

== Publications ==
Nangiar has also published a book on Koodiyattam, titled Abhinethri.

== Awards ==
- 2014 – Kerala Sangeetha Nataka Akademi Award
