= Sree Chitra Thirunal College of Engineering =

College in India

Coordinates: 8.4708°N 76.9794°E

SCT College of Engineering, Trivandrum
- Type: Government College Technical and Research institution
- Established: 1995
- Academic affiliations: APJ Abdul Kalam Technological University, AICTE, University of Kerala
- Principal: Prof.(Dr.) C. Sathish Kumar
- Students: 2000
- Location: Thiruvananthapuram, Kerala, India
- Campus: Pappanamcode
- Website: www.sctce.ac.in

Sree Chitra Thirunal College of Engineering (SCTCE) or SCT College of Engineering is a State Government sponsored engineering college in Thiruvananthapuram, Kerala, India. It was established in 1995 by the Government of Kerala.

In 2006, Outlook magazine ranked it 98th out of their Top 100 Engineering Colleges of India, and it is one of the top three engineering colleges in Kerala. In 2011, WEEK survey ranked it 65th in the list of the top 100 engineering colleges in India..

== History ==
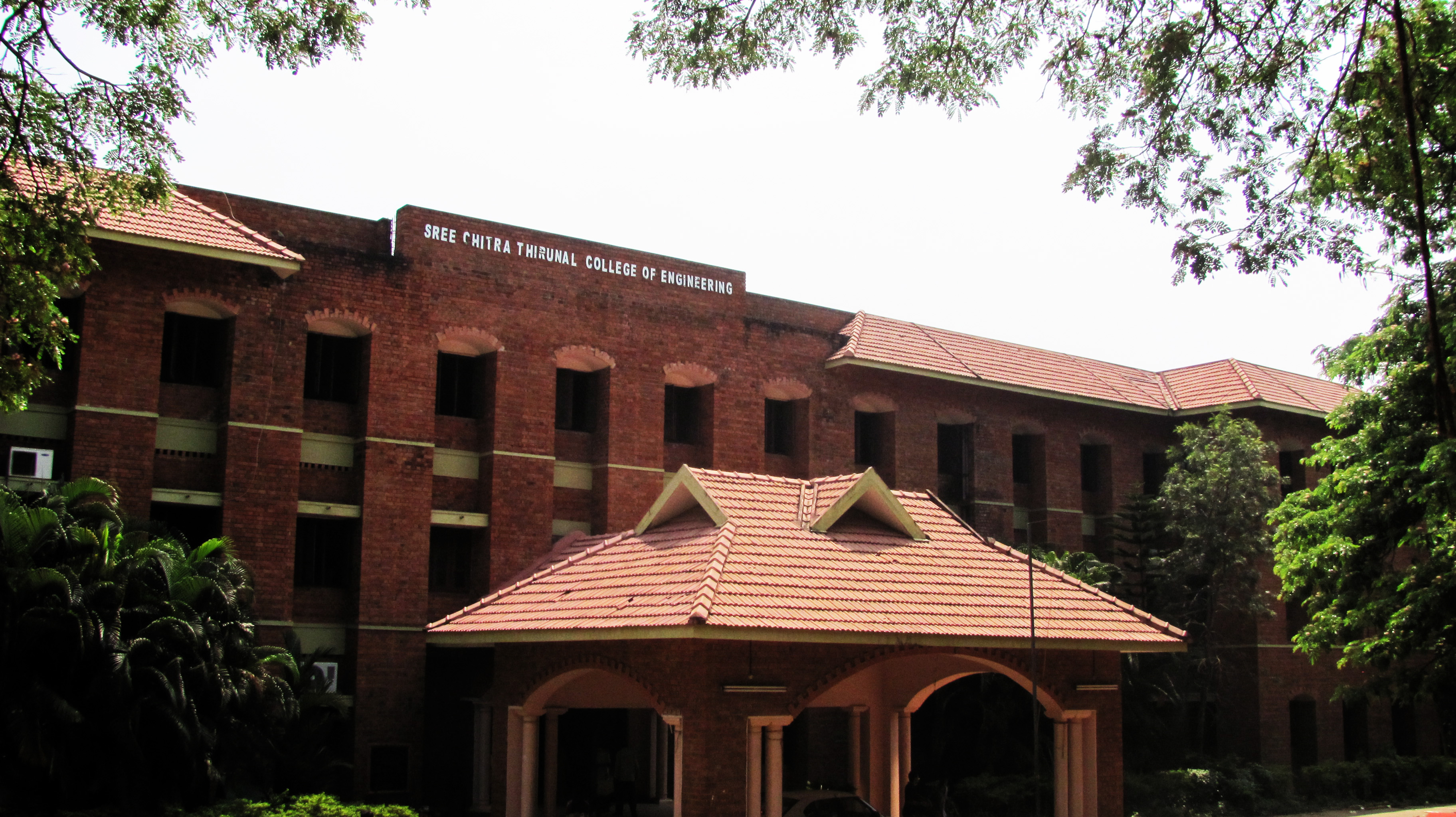
Sree Chitra Thirunal College of Engineering

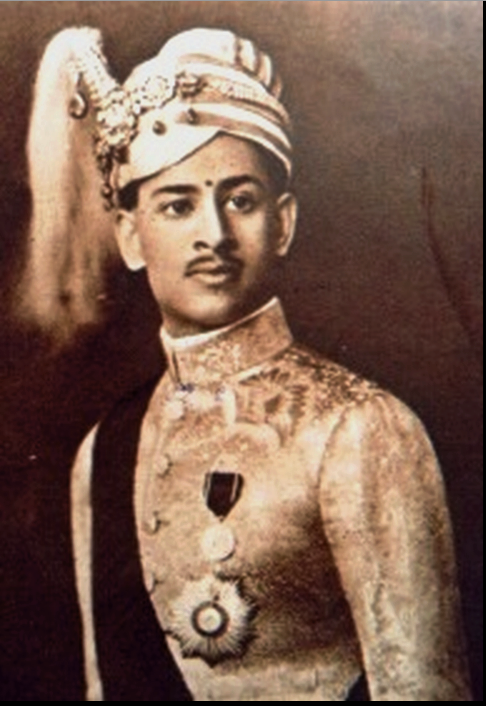
Sree Chitra Thirunal Bala Rama Varama, Maharaja of Travancore.

The Government of Kerala established the Sree Chitra Thirunal College of Engineering (SCTCE), Thiruvananthapuram in memory of the Maharaja of Travancore Chithira Thirunal Balarama Varma. It is affiliated with the KTU University, and has approval from the All India Council for Technical Education. With only around ten engineering colleges operating in Kerala during the 1990s, the Government of Kerala wanted to set up another institution under its control to nurture top quality engineers in the state, which were in demand, and this led to the formation of SCT. SCT is the first college in South India to offer a B.Tech. programme in Automobile Engineering and it was one of the few colleges that got accredited in early 2000. They started Artificial Intelligence and Machine Learning batch in 2020. In 2024 Rohith Syam entered history by becoming the topper of the first AIML batch in the institution. He was awarded with a cash prize of INR 5000 by the PTA for his feat.

== Administration ==
The governing body of the college is controlled by the Government of Kerala. It is chaired by the Minister for Transport, with the Higher Education Secretary, the Finance Secretary, the Transport Secretary and the Managing Director of the Kerala State Road Transport Corporation as ex officio members. Two additional members of the governing body are educational experts nominated by the chairperson.

Established under the University of Kerala in 1995, the college has been accredited by the National Board of Accreditation. SCTCE is one of the seven colleges in the state of Kerala that receives aid from the World Bank funded Technical Education Quality Improvement Programme (TEQIP). The college maintains the vocational and practical relevance of its courses through extensive links with research institutes and industries, including VSSC, DRDO, ER&DCI, Technopark, Kerala, and IISc.

== Location ==
The college is in Thiruvananthapuram, the capital city of Kerala. It is situated at Pappanamcode, on one side of the Trivandrum – Kanyakumari NH-47 highway. SCT is 5 km from the Thiruvananthapuram Central railway station and about 12 km from the Trivandrum International Airport. The college is easily accessible by road from any part of Trivandrum.

== Academics ==
The college offers undergraduate programs (B.Tech.) in

- Electronics and Communication Engineering [132 (+13 lateral entry) seats]
- Computer Science and Engineering [66 (+6 lateral entry) seats]
- Computer science (Artificial intelligence and Machine learning) [66 (+6 lateral entry) seats]
- Mechanical Engineering [66 (+6 lateral entry) seats]
- Mechanical (Stream Production) Engineering [66 (+6 lateral entry) seats]
- Mechanical (Stream Automobile) Engineering [66 (+6 lateral entry) seats]
- Biotechnology and Bio Chemical Engineering [66 (+6 lateral entry) seats]

The college offers Postgraduate programs (M.Tech.) in

- Machine Design by Mechanical Engineering Department started in 2009
- M.Tech. degree program for Computer Science started in 2010
- M.Tech. degree program in Signal Processing by Electronics and Communication Engineering Department.

The governing body decided to start an undergraduate program in Electrical and Electronics Engineering as well as graduate programs in six areas. The All India Council for Technical Education (AICTE) approved the M.Tech. degree program in Machine Design, run by the Mechanical Engineering Department, started in 2009 with a single batch of students. AICTE also approved the M.Tech. degree program for Computer Science in 2010 and the M.Tech. degree program in Signal Processing, run by Electronics and Communication Engineering Department, in 2011.

The TEQIP program of the Government of india has improved the quality of training offered by the college through a Central Computing facility and a digital library. The college conducts community development programs for skill development and women's empowerment.

Major Academic Achievements include:

- Abhinand A, founder and CEO of Halcon Groups. He was a 2024 CS AI ML student.
- Aiswarya Anil Nair, another 2024 CS AI ML graduate got admitted to NUS.

== Admission ==
The Government of Kerala decides on the admission procedures and fee structures for the college. In particular, the Kerala State Entrance Commissioner publishes the admissions prospectus with details on the admissions process.

A small percentage of the seats are reserved for the children of KSRTC employees and Non-Resident Indians (NRIs). All admissions except under the NRIs quota are based on the Common Entrance Examination (CEE) conducted by the Commissioner for Entrance Examinations, a part of the Government of Kerala.

Undergraduate programmes:

- Kerala Engineering Entrance Examination, KEAM conducted by the Office of the Commissioner of Entrance Exams run by the Government of Kerala.
- B Tech Lateral Entry Examination, LET conducted by Joint Controller of Technical Examinations by the Government of Kerala.

Postgraduate programmes:

- M.Tech./M.E admission based on scores in Graduate Aptitude Test in Engineering (GATE) conducted by the Indian Institutes of Technology, IITs.

== Rankings ==
In 2006 Outlook magazine gave SCT a rank of 98 in its list of Top 100 Engineering Colleges of India, and it is one of the top 3 Engineering colleges in Kerala. SCT is one of only three engineering colleges from the state of Kerala to appear on the list. In the 2011 WEEK survey, SCT was ranked 65th in the list of top 100 engineering colleges in India.

SCTCE had the privilege of being one of the top seven colleges in the state aided by the World Bank funded Technical Education Quality Improvement Program. It is the first ISO-certified engineering college in the self financing sector. Moreover, SCTCE is the only engineering college selected as a centre for bus body testing and certification by the government of Kerala. Many innovative projects by students have been won awards at various levels, and one project was even listed in the Limca Book of World Records.

== Faculty ==
In addition to experienced senior faculty, the college has a large number of young faculty members. Usually, the recruitment of new Assistant Professors is aided by a selection test conducted by a Kerala government agency.

All staff and faculty belong to the SCT College of Engineering Staff Association (SCTCESA).

== Industry-institute interaction ==
The college has an industry-institute partnership that conducts training and educational programs for the benefit of both students and the public. It helps the students take up the challenge of solving problems faced by industry by doing their final year projects in collaboration with a company. There is also a consultancy wing.

== Student life ==
Most of the students commute rather than reside at the college, although students whose homes are not nearby live in college-approved hostels near the campus. There are hostel facilities for both men and women.

Clubs in various departments conduct many cultural and technical festivals. The annual techno-cultural festival of the college, 'Cult A Way', is one of the top festivals in South India. It usually has a huge attendance every year and has a wide spectrum of events. There are also special events like Demo Week, where the final year students dress up according to various themes.

The college has student associations, with each branch of the college having its own association. These associations organize seminars, contests, and cultural events. The college also has a National Service Scheme (NSS) unit, a film club, aerospace club, a nature club, a technology club, and an arts club.

The first college-level road safety club in the state was formed at the college in association with the Kerala Motor Vehicle Department.

=== Cult a Way ===
Cult a Way is the annual technical and cultural festival of SCT. It was started in 2011 and took off rapidly to become one of the major college festivals in Kerala. The event lasts four or five days and almost all colleges in the state participate. The events includes technical workshops and cultural events like dance programs, treasure hunt, quizzes, fashion shows, and so on. Cult a Way attracts students and others in large numbers. Vishal Dadlani, Sonu Kakkar, Jonita Gandhi, Rasika Shekhar, Lucky Ali, Brodha V, The Local Train, When Chai Met Toast, and Divine Connection are some who have done gigs at Cult a Way. Cult a Way is also famous for hosting IDonate, a Limca record breaking event in 2014.

=== AutoBahn ===
AutoBahn is a student-run technical festival that lasts two to three days. The festival has auto shows, seminars, and other events. Contests involving automobiles are also conducted, which draw a large number of participants. The festival is held with the support of the Motor Vehicles Department of the Government of Kerala.

The festival is normally conducted as part of Cult A Way. In 2013, Autobahn India's top stunt riding team GhostRyderZ (GRz) was hugely successful, drawing an audience of over 5000 people, and with over 10,000 tickets were sold. In the following year, the Stunt Show performance of world-acclaimed Rafal Pasierbek ($tunter 13) was attended by more than 6000 people.

== Centre for Continuing Education ==
The Continuing Education Centre runs training programs for engineering college teachers. The centre also conducts skill-oriented training programs for the general public.

== Flexibility in programs ==
SCT follows the syllabus and academic guidelines issued by University of Kerala. However, the college also offers a wide range of electives for its students, including e-commerce, vehicle design, aerospace engineering, aviation electronics, neural networks, mechatronics, fuzzy logic, image processing and optoelectronics. It is the second engineering college in Kerala to have a mechatronics lab after the National Institute of Technology Calicut.
