= Pappanamcode =

- suburban
- Location within Kerala
- Coordinates: 8°28′11″N 76°58′57″E
- Country: India
- State: Kerala
- District: Thiruvananthapuram
- City: Thiruvananthapuram
- PIN code: 695018
- STD code: 0471
- Vehicle registration: KL-01

Pappanamcode(Abode of Mahouts) is a locality of Thiruvananthapuram, the capital of Kerala, India. Only 5 km from Trivandrum central railway station and bus stand. It is one of the major industrial centres in Trivandrum.

== Location ==
Located on NH 47 en route to Nagercoil, it is approximately 5 km from Thampanoor, where the Trivandrum Central railway station and the KSRTC central bus stand are located. Distance from the airport is roughly 15 km. KSRTC's Central Workshop is situated here, along with a KSRTC bus depot. Other offices include those of Bharat Sanchar Nigam Limited, Kerala State Financial Enterprises, Regional Research Laboratory (NIIST - CSIR), and Sree Chitra Thirunal College of Engineering. All buses to Kaliyikkavila, Neyyattinkara, Nagercoil and Kanyakumari pass via Pappanamcode except buses through bypass.

=== Co-ordinates ===
It is located at 8°28′11″N 76°58′57″E.

== Prominent Institutions ==
- Sree Chitra Thirunal College of Engineering
- Regional Research Laboratory (CSIR)
- Mannam Memorial Residential Higher Secondary School
- NSS Women's College
- KSRTC Central Workshop

== Notable people ==
- G. Venu, Kathakali, Koodiyattam exponent and research scholar.
