= Peter Oskarson =

Swedish theatre director and actor

Peter Oskarson (born 1951) is a Swedish theatre director and actor from Stockholm. He was educated at the Swedish National Academy of Mime and Acting from 1971 to 1973, where he studied directing under Rudolf Penka, Wolfgang Heinz and Giorgio Strehler.

Oskarson has been the artistic director of several theatre companies, including Teater 7 (1965–1969), Skånska Teatern (1973–1982), Folkteatern i Gävleborg (1982–1990 and 1997–2006), the Orion Theatre (1993–2000), and Stiftelsen Helsingegården (1990–2004).

Oskarson has received the Alf Sjöberg Prize, the Theatre Prize of the Swedish Academy (1989), the Olof Högberg Prize (1990), the Theatre prize of Expressen and the Thalia Prize of Svenska Dagbladet (1990), the Thalia Prize of Malmö (1994), the Culture Prize of Hembygdsförbundet (2000), the Sture Linnér Prize (2002), and the Culture Prize of Gefle Dagblads (2004).
