= Parayan Thullal =

Dance and poetic performance form prevailed in Kerala

Parayan Thullal is a dance and poetic performance form prevailed in the state of Kerala, India. This one of the three major thullal forms prevailing in Kerala. Others are Ottan Thullal and Sheethankan Thullal. Usually, it is conducted in the morning time. The Sanskrit metre Mallika is commonly used in this art form.

== Performing ==
The tempo of this art form is very slow. The performer explains the meanings of the songs by using gestures. The dance element is very little in this art form and most of the time the performer will stand erect. Usually the stories of Parayan thullal deals with spiritual matters.

== Costume ==
The costume of Parayan thullal resembles Shesha. The person performing the art wears the dress and crown in the shape of snake. A red cloth is worn on the waist. The face will be adorned with yellow paint.

== List of some Parayan Thullals ==
- Sabhapravesham
- Thripuradahanam
- Kumbhakarnavadham
- Dakshayagam
- Keechakavadham
- Pulindeemoksham
- Sundopasundopakhyanam
- Nalayanicharitham
- Harichandracharitham

== See also ==
- Ottan Thullal
- Sheethankan Thullal
- Arts of Kerala
- Killikkurussimangalam
- Mani Madhava Chakyar
- Chakyar koothu
- Kathakali
- Mohiniyattam
- Koodiyattam
- Panchavadyam
- Kerala Kalamandalam
