= Sheethankan Thullal =

Dance and poetic performance form in Kerala, India

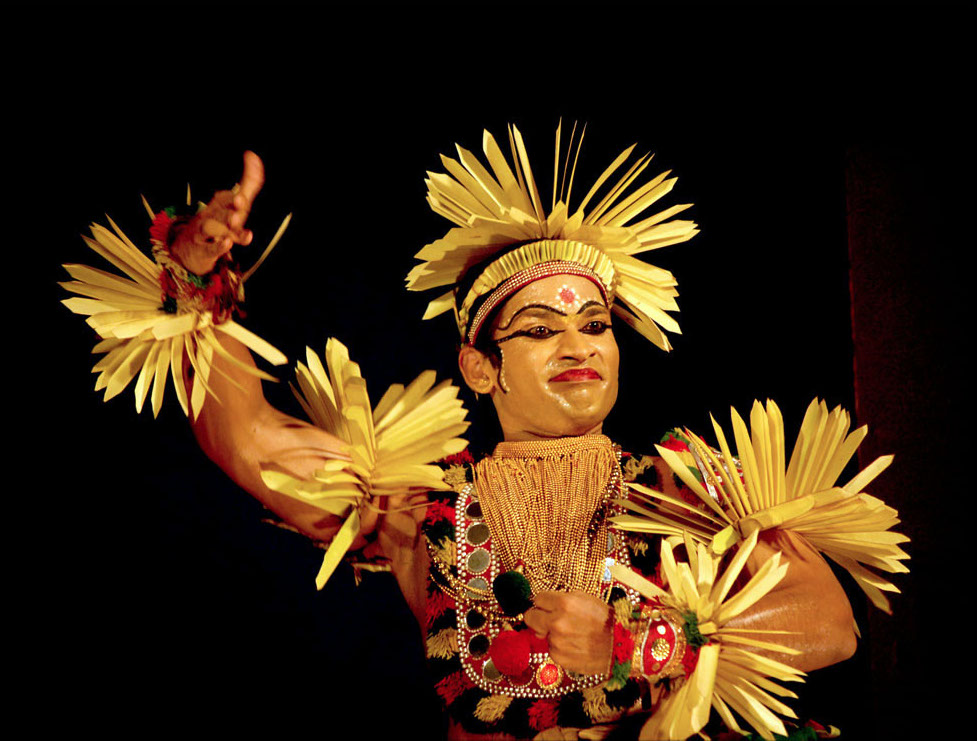
Sheethankan Thullal

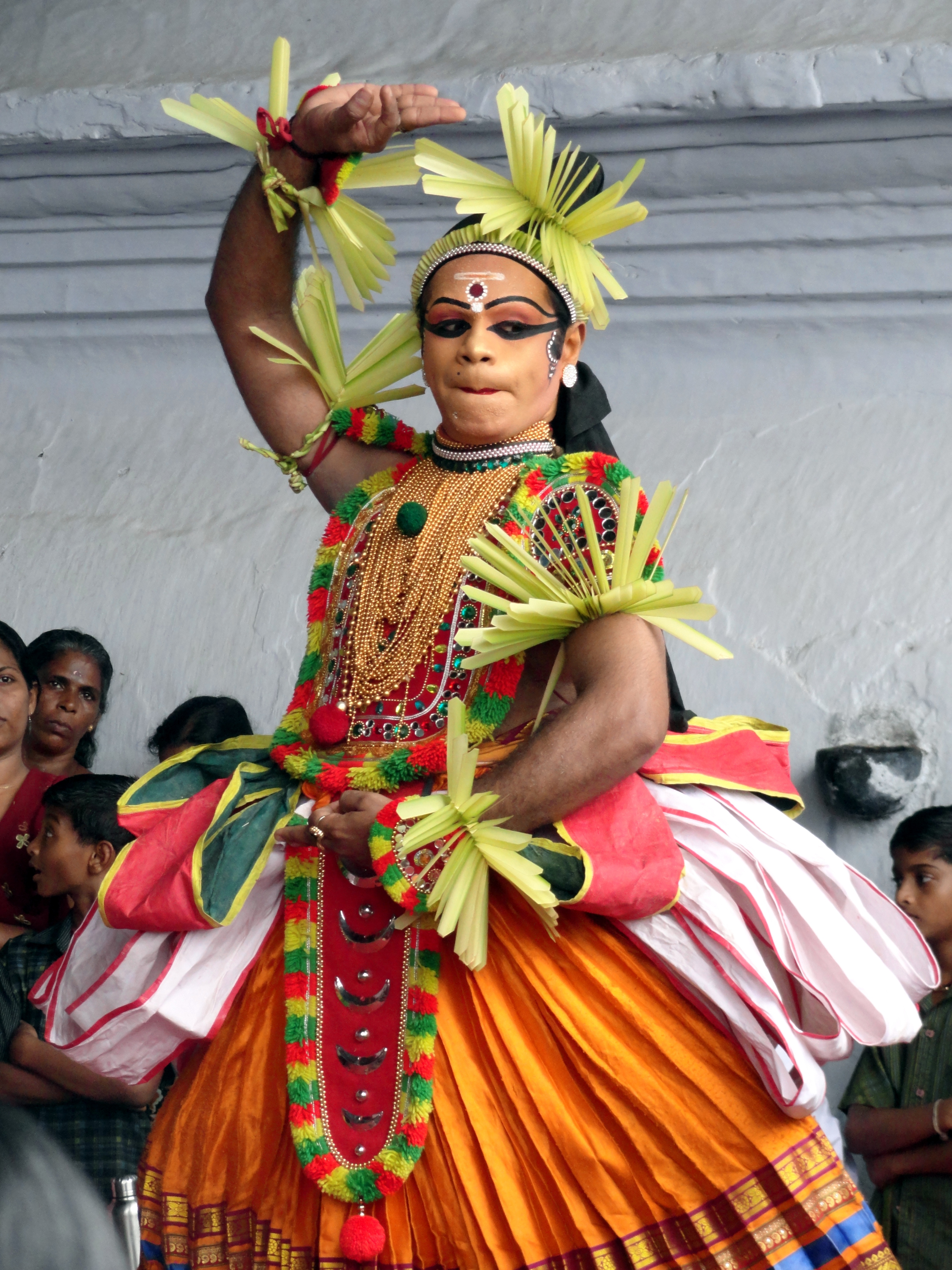
Sheethankan Thullal conducted in Thrippunithura temple.

Sheethankan Thullal is a dance and poetic performance form in Kerala, India. This one of the three major thullal forms prevailing in Kerala. Others are Ottan Thullal and Parayan Thullal. This dance is performed in a very slow tempo. It gives importance to gestures than vocal actions.

== Performance ==
Usually Sheethankan Thullal is performed in midnight. But it can also performed in day time without using any lamps on stage. Minimum three persons should be needed for the performance. One for staging the performance and others for playing musical instruments.

== Costume ==
The performer will be dressed with special costume for thullal. They use yellow coloured powder in face and use dress made up of Coconut leaves. Usually Kakali is the metre used in this dance form.

== Origin ==
Sheethankan thullal was discovered by famous Malayalam poet Kunchan Nambiar in Ambalappuzha.

== See also ==
- Ottan Thullal
- Parayan Thullal
