= Ottan Thullal =

Recite-and-dance art-form of Kerala, India

Ottanthullal performer with green makeup and a colourful costume (decorated with a long red and white band and painted wooden ornaments)

Ottan Thullal (or Ottamthullal) is a recite-and-dance art form of Kerala, India. It was introduced in the 18th century by Kunchan Nambiar, one of the Prachina Kavithrayam (three famous Malayalam-language poets). The folksy performance, often laced with humour intended at criticism of society, is accompanied by music using a mridangam (a barrel-shaped double-headed drum) and/or the handy idakka besides a pair of elathalam cymbals.

== History ==
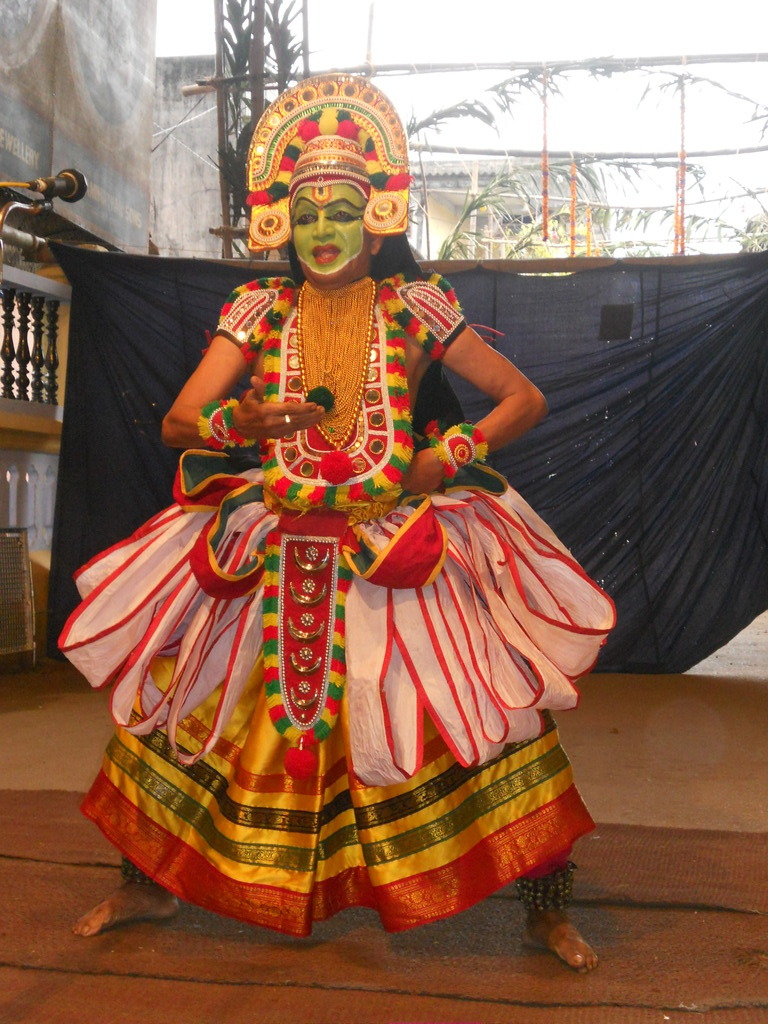
Ottamthullal performance during a temple festival

Like most Indian performing art forms, Ottamthullal has its principles influenced by the Natya Shastra (c. 2nd century BCE). The word Thullal means "to jump" or "leap about" in the Malayalam language. Legend has it that Nambiar, the poet, fell asleep while playing the mizhavu drum for a Chakyar Koothu performance, inviting ridicule from the chakyar. In response, Nambiar developed Ottamthullal, which raised prevalent sociopolitical questions and made a satire of human pedigrees and prejudices. The chakyar complained about Nambiar's production to the king of Chembakassery. The king banned performances of Ottamthullal from the Ambalapuzha temple complex. Closely related art forms are Seethankan thullal and Parayan thullal. Mathur Panikkar popularized Ottamthullal for modern audiences. Ottamthullal competitions are held and the art form may be used to spread a social message.

== Performers ==
In Ottamthullal, a solo performer, with green makeup and a colourful costume (decorated with a long red and white band and painted wooden ornaments), acts and dances while reciting dance (Thullal) (lyrics). A chorus or one or more artists repeats each sentence as it is completed. More recently, Ottamthullal has been performed with a solo female actor and with an ensemble cast.

== Theme ==
Nambiar parodies the ways of landlords and other prominent citizens, sometimes even the king. For example, the character of Bhima from the epic the Mahabharata is portrayed as an oaf. Higher castes including Brahmin are not spared.

== Language ==
Ottan thullal is performed in Malayalam, which pleases local audiences. Old sayings and elements of folklore are used.

== Works ==
There may be 64 or more Ottamthullal works. Examples include:

- Kallyana Sougandhikam (a rare flower), Bhima is searching for the flower and has a long conversation with his older brother, Hanuman.
- Kiratham, rukmini swayamvaram, keechakavadham, Garudagarva bhangam, Santhanagopalam, Ghoshayathra etc...

== Related images ==
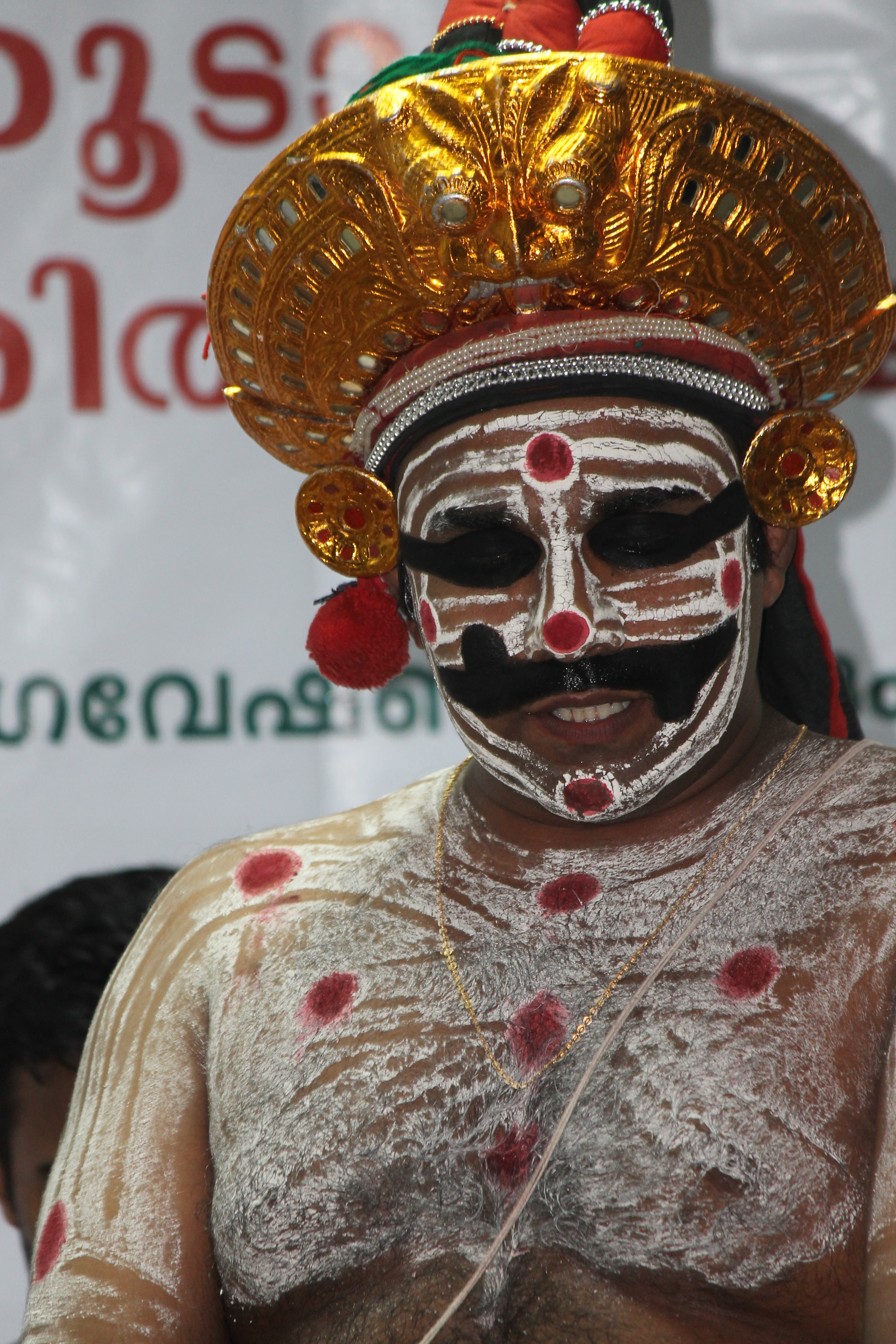
Chakyar koothu

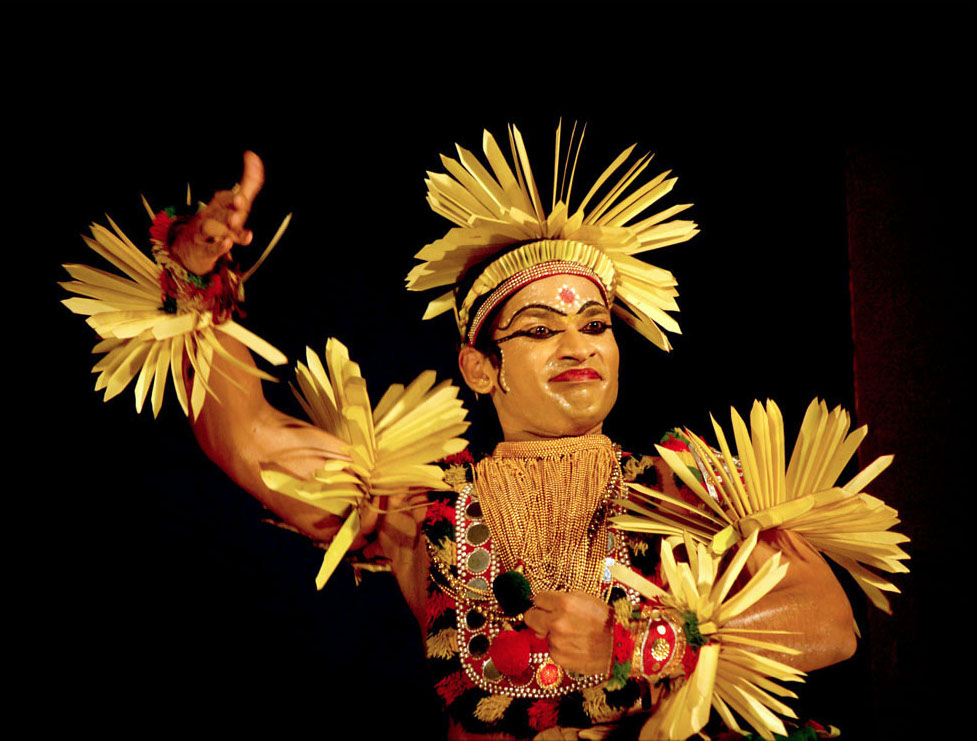
Sheethankan Thullal

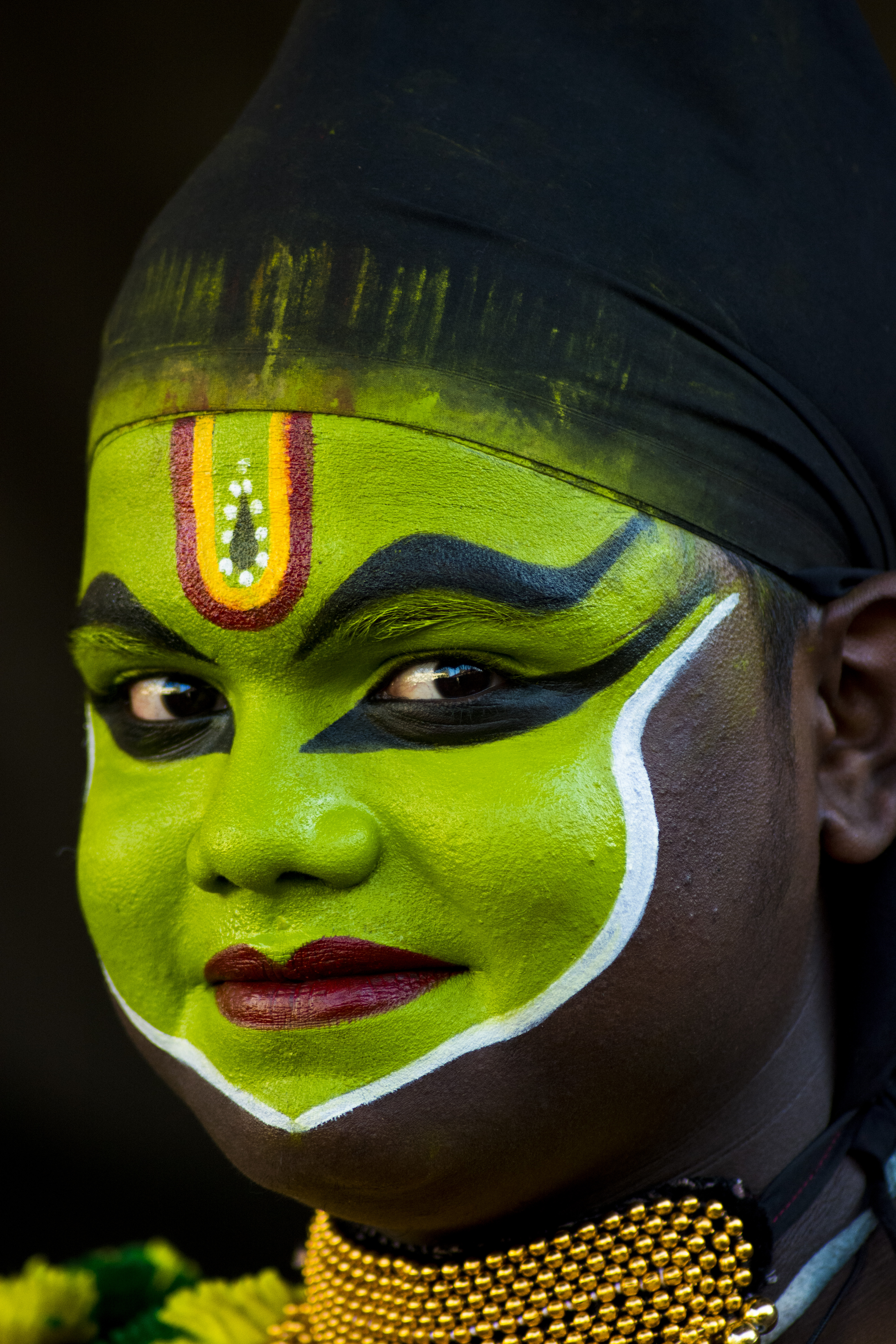
Make-up

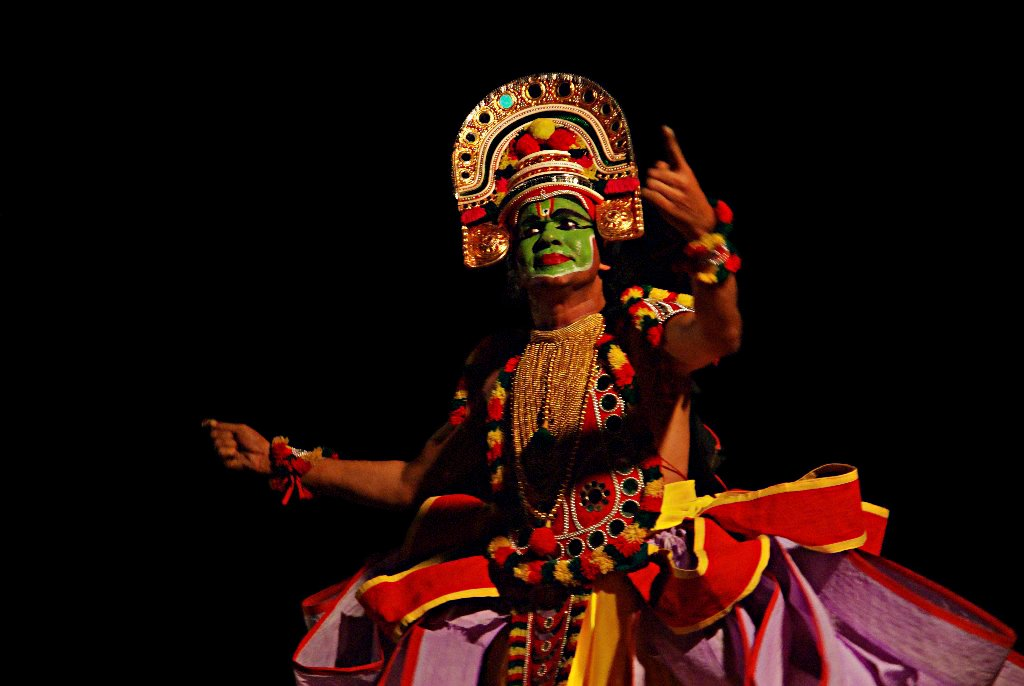
Ottamthullal performance in Kerala

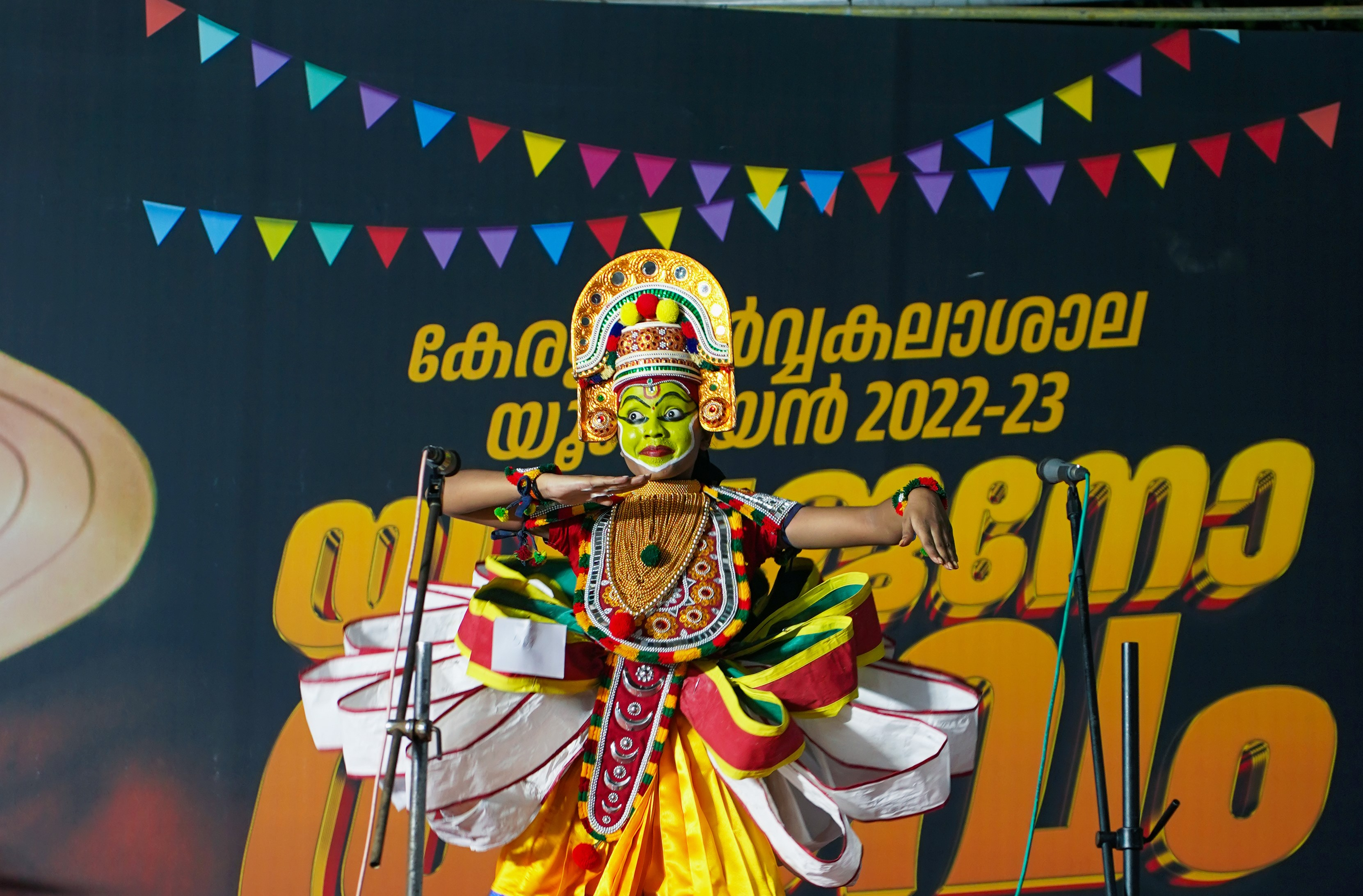
Ottamthullal

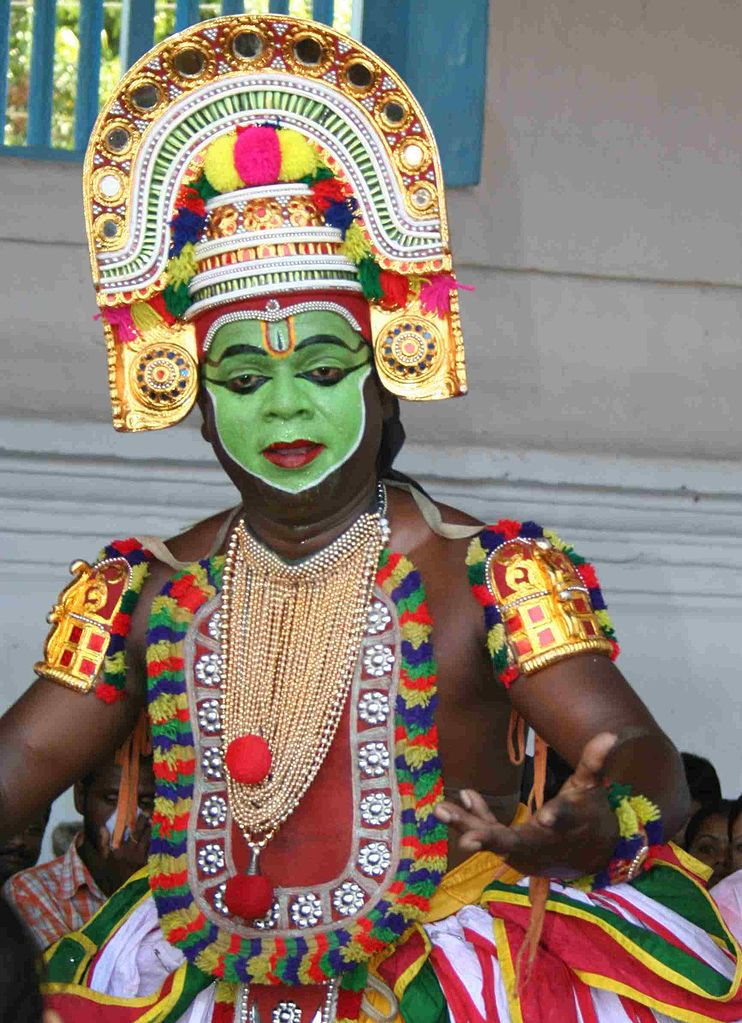
Ottamthullal

== See also ==
- Arts of Kerala
- Parayan Thullal
- Sheethankan Thullal
- Killikkurussimangalam
- Mani Madhava Chakyar
- Chakyar koothu
- Kathakali
- Mohiniyattam
- Koodiyattam
- Panchavadyam
- Kerala Kalamandalam
