= Ammannur Madhava Chakyar =

Master of Kutiyattam (1917–2008)

Ammanur Madhava Chakyar
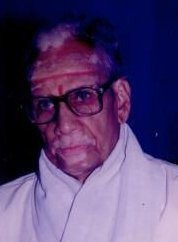
- Born: 13 May 1917
- Died: 1 July 2008 (aged 91); Irinjalakuda, Kerala
- Occupation: Kutiyattam master

Ammannur Madhava Chakyar (13 May 1917 – 1 July 2008) was a master of Kutiyattam, the classical Sanskrit theatrical form indigenous to Kerala. He is best known for taking the performances from the temple sanctuaries where they were formerly confined and making them public events.

== Recognition ==
- Padma Bhushan from Government of India–2003
- Padma Shri in 1981
- Sangeet Natak Akademi Award - 1979
- Kerala Sangeetha Nataka Akademi Fellowship - 1990
- Kalidasa Samman
- D-Lit degree from University of Kannur, Kerala
- Golden Bangle From International centre of Kutiyattam, Thrippunithura
- Unesco Recitation from Paris in 2001
- Kerala Sangeeth Natak Akademy Award
- Kerala Kalamandalam Award
