= Nangiar koothu =

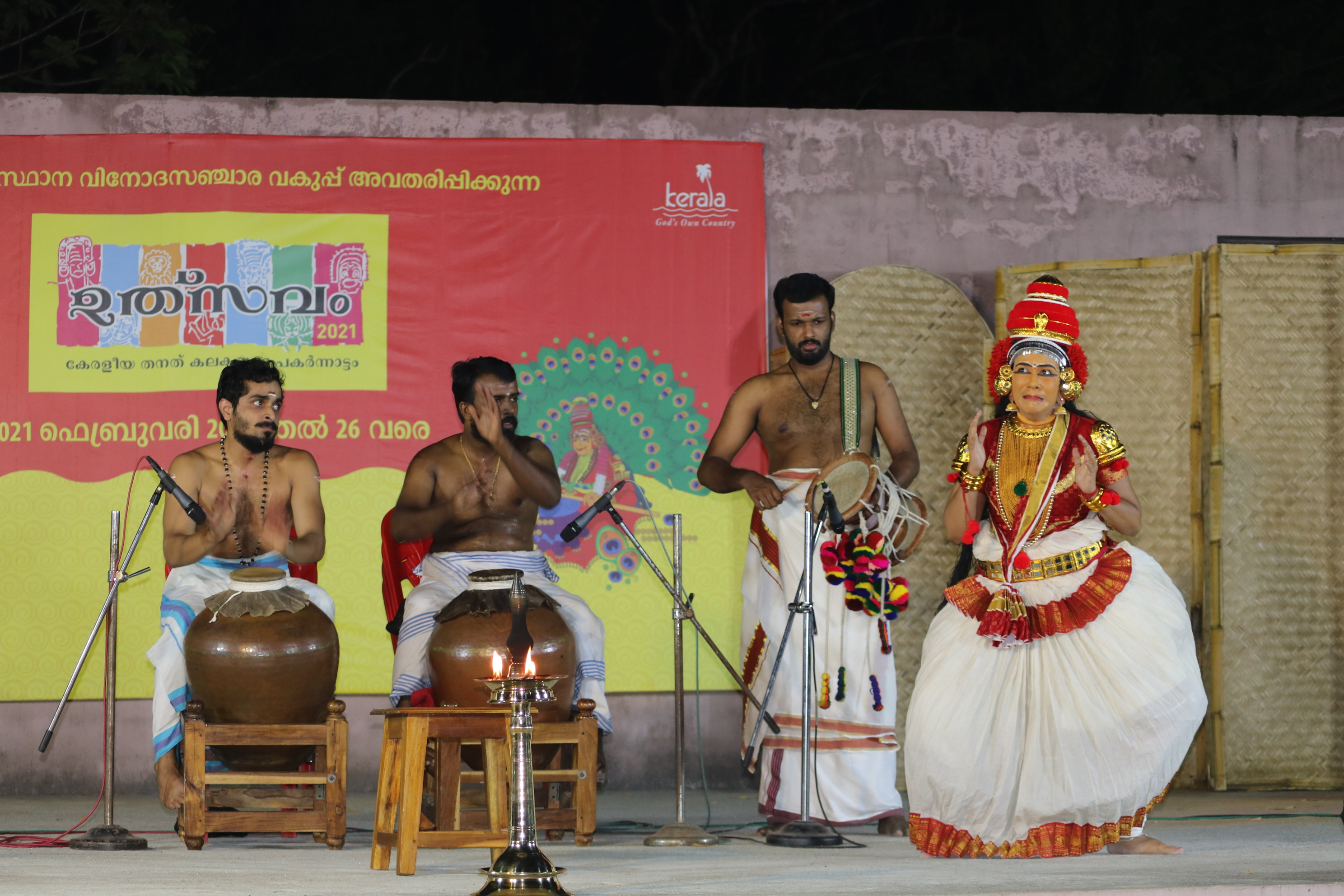
Nangiar Koothu

Nangiar koothu or Nangyar Koothu (Malayalam; Tamil: நங்கையர் கூத்து; lit. the dance of women) is an allied traditional art of Kutiyattam, an age-old Sanskrit drama tradition of India. It is performed traditionally by the women of the Ambalavasi Nambiar community of Kerala, known as Nangyaramma, but since the second half of the 20th century it's no longer the case.

Nangiarkoothu, an offshoot of Kutiyattam, is a solo performance with an antiquity of 1500 years. It is the sole domain of female artistes. The stories for the performance are taken from the text Sree Krishna Charitam, depicting the life of Lord Krishna. During the performance the actress presents the long-winded stories of Lord Krishna through hand gestures, facial expressions, and body movements to the accompaniment of the resonant pot drum mizhavu.

== Gallery ==
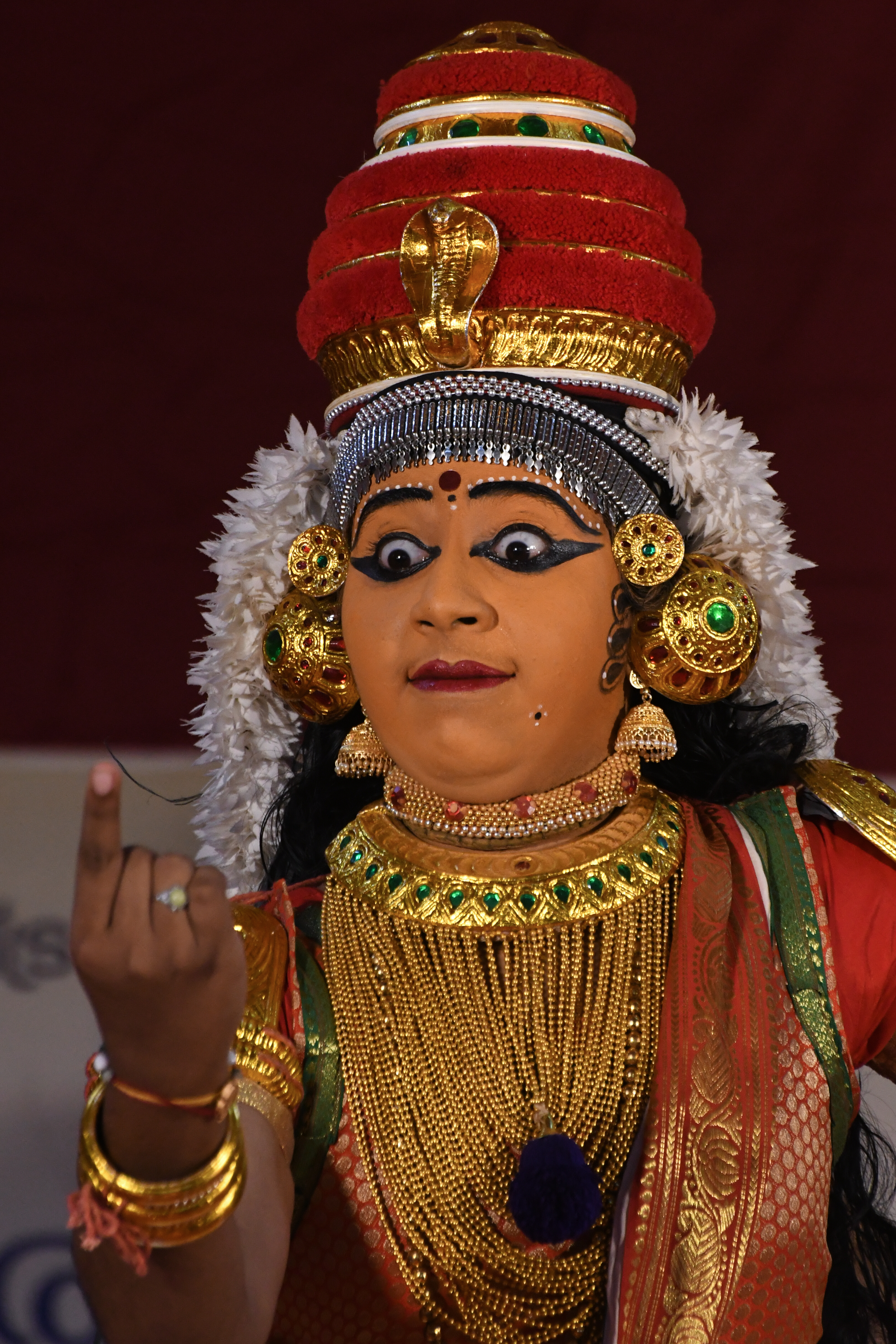
Nangyar kooth of Kerala

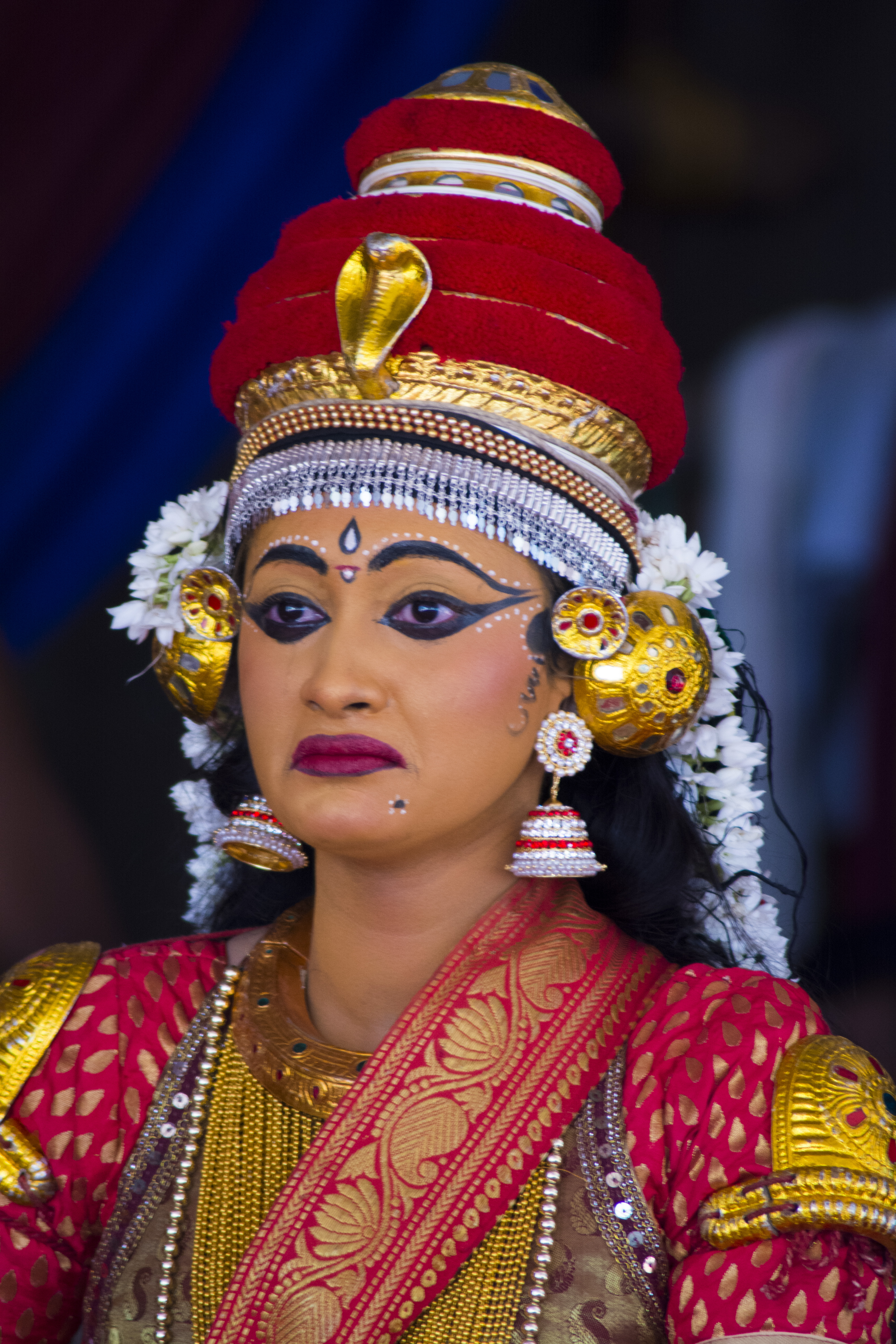
At Kerala school Kalolsavam

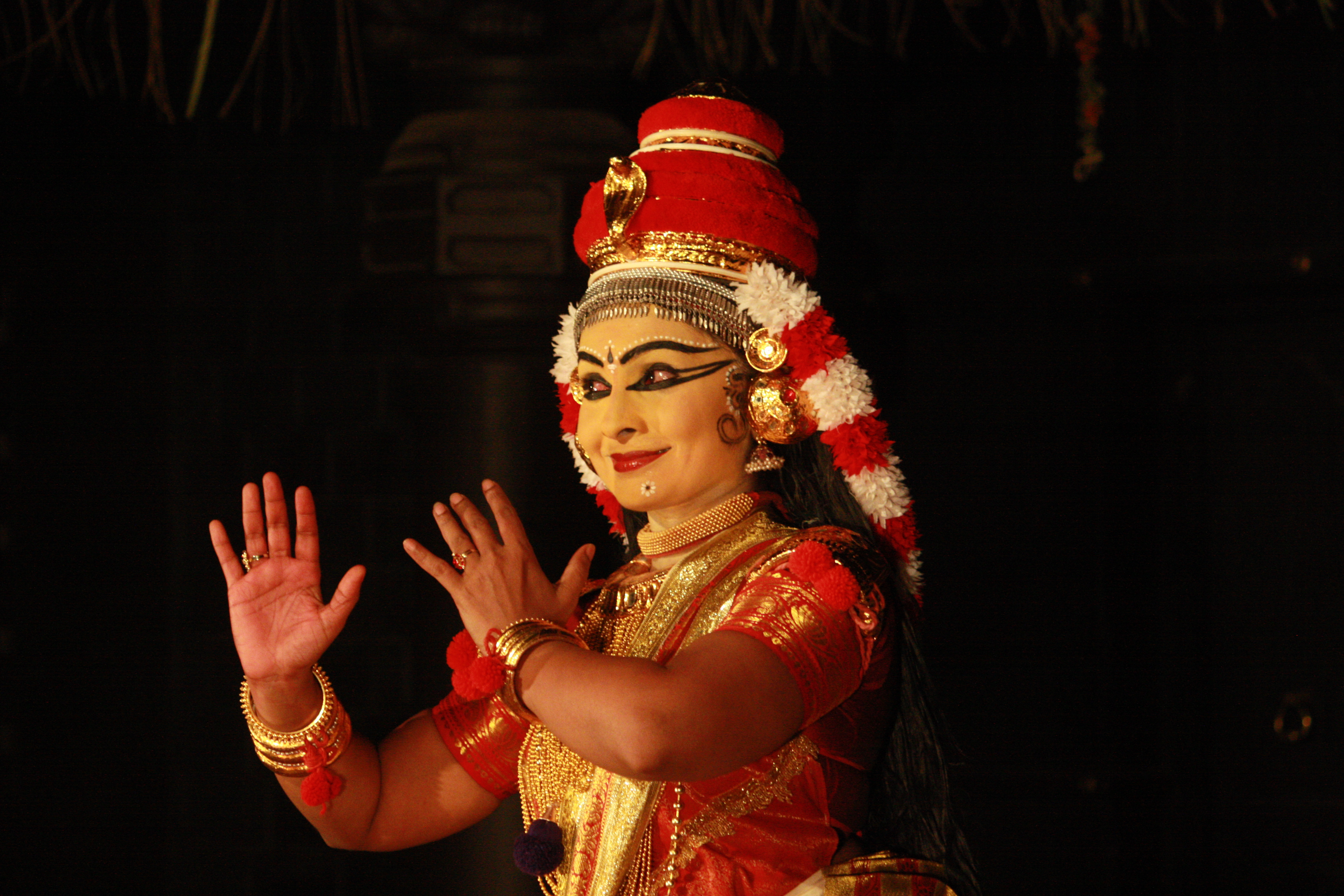

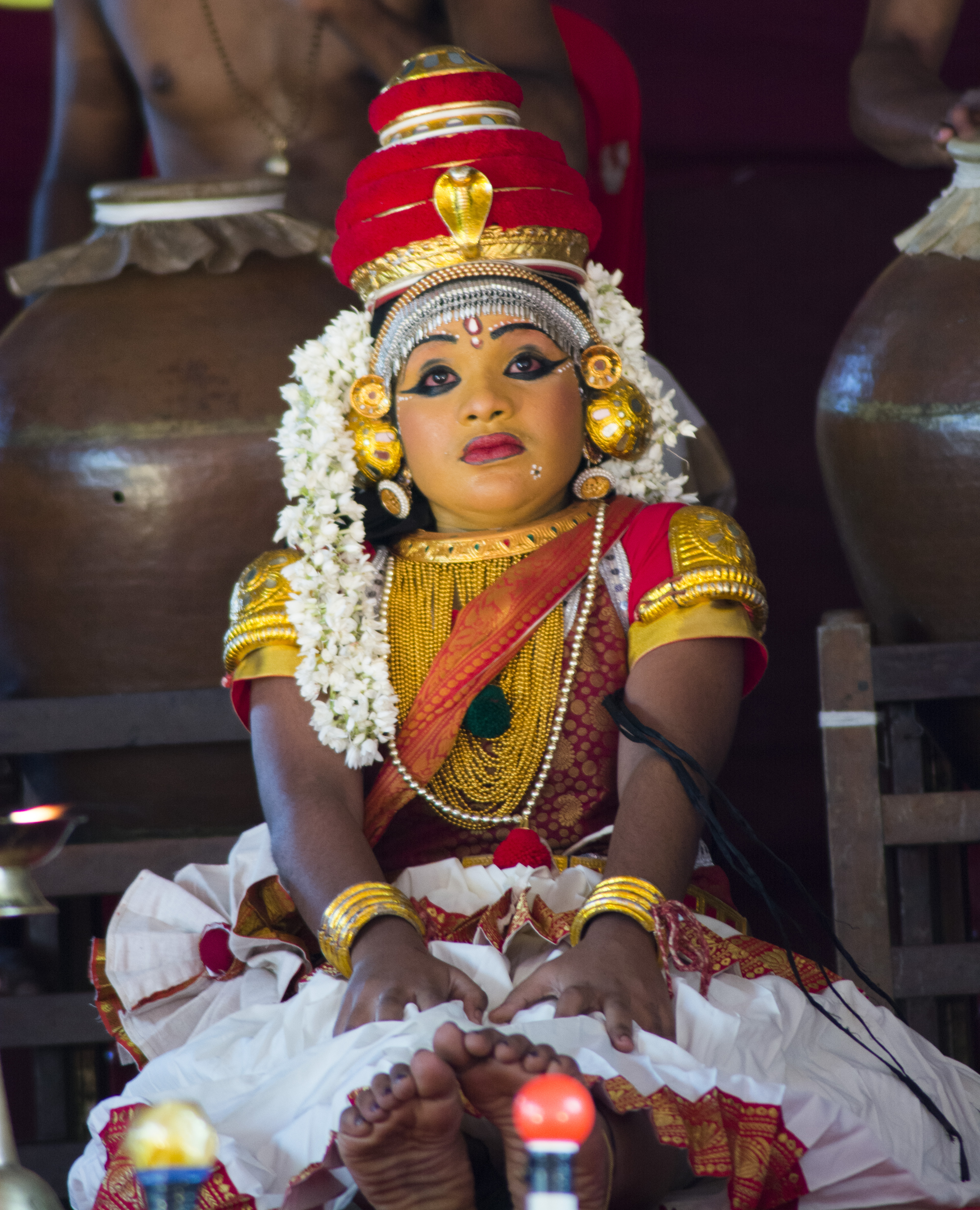
Poothanaamoksham

== See also ==
- Chakyar Koothu
- Koodiyattam
- Mani Madhava Chakyar
- Margi Sathi
