= Koodiyattam =

Traditional performing art form in Kerala, India

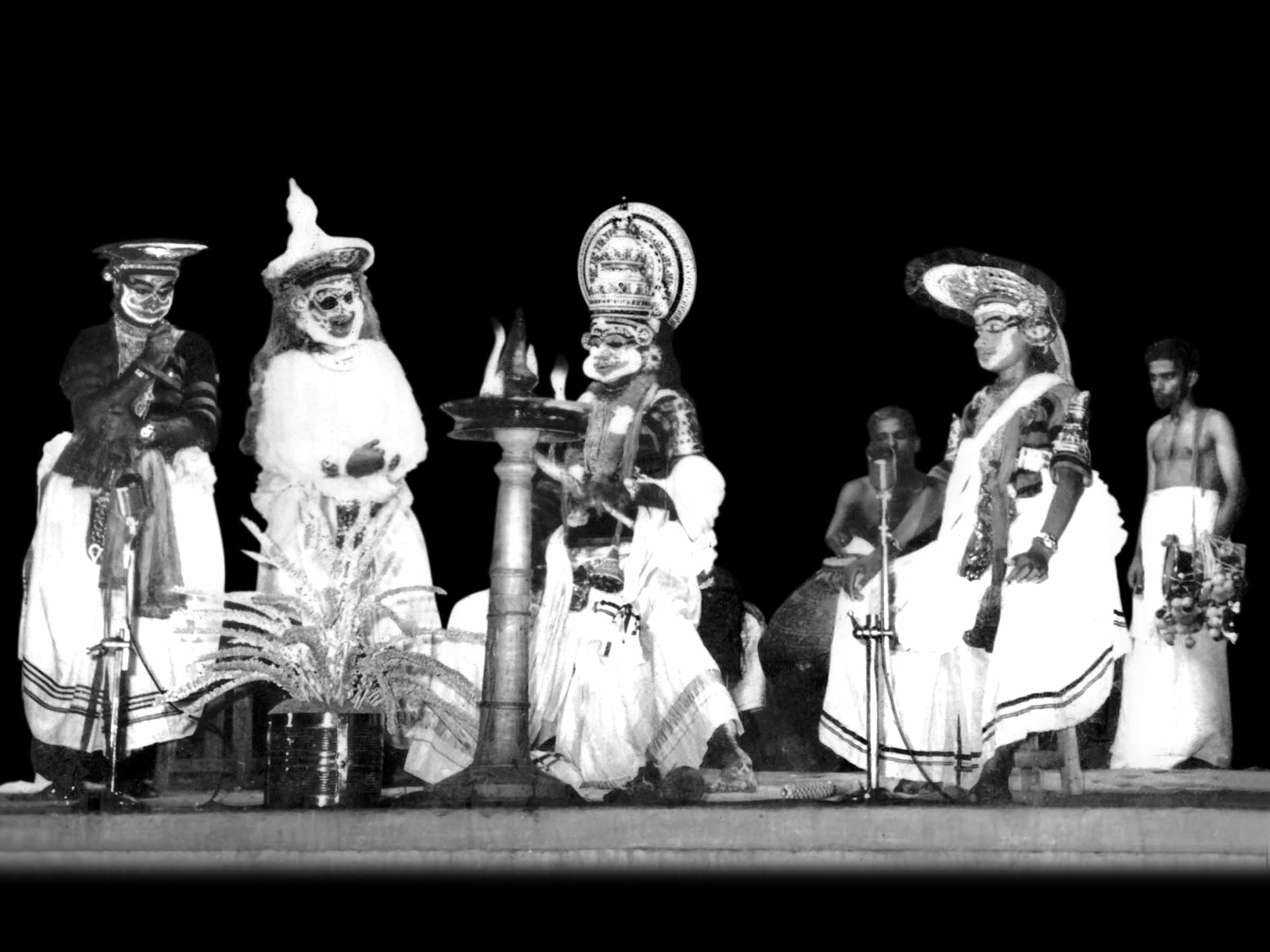
- Guru Mani Madhava Chakyar and his troupe performing Thoranayudham (part of Bhasa's play Abhiṣeka Nataka based on the epic Ramayana) Koodiyattam (1962, Chennai)
- Medium: Sanskrit theatre with Koothu
- Ancestor arts: Koothu
- Originating culture: Kerala
- Originating era: Sangam era

Kutiyattam, Sanskrit theatre
- UNESCO Intangible Cultural Heritage
- Country: India
- Reference: 00010
- Region: Asia and the Pacific

Inscription history
- Inscription: 2001 (3rd session)
- List: Representative

Koodiyattam (Malayalam: കൂടിയാട്ടം; IAST: kūṭiyāṭṭaṁ; lit. 'combined act') is a traditional performing art form in the state of Kerala, India. It is a combination of ancient Sanskrit theatre with elements of Koothu, an ancient performing art from the Sangam era. It is officially recognised by UNESCO as a Masterpiece of the Oral and Intangible Heritage of Humanity.

== Origin ==
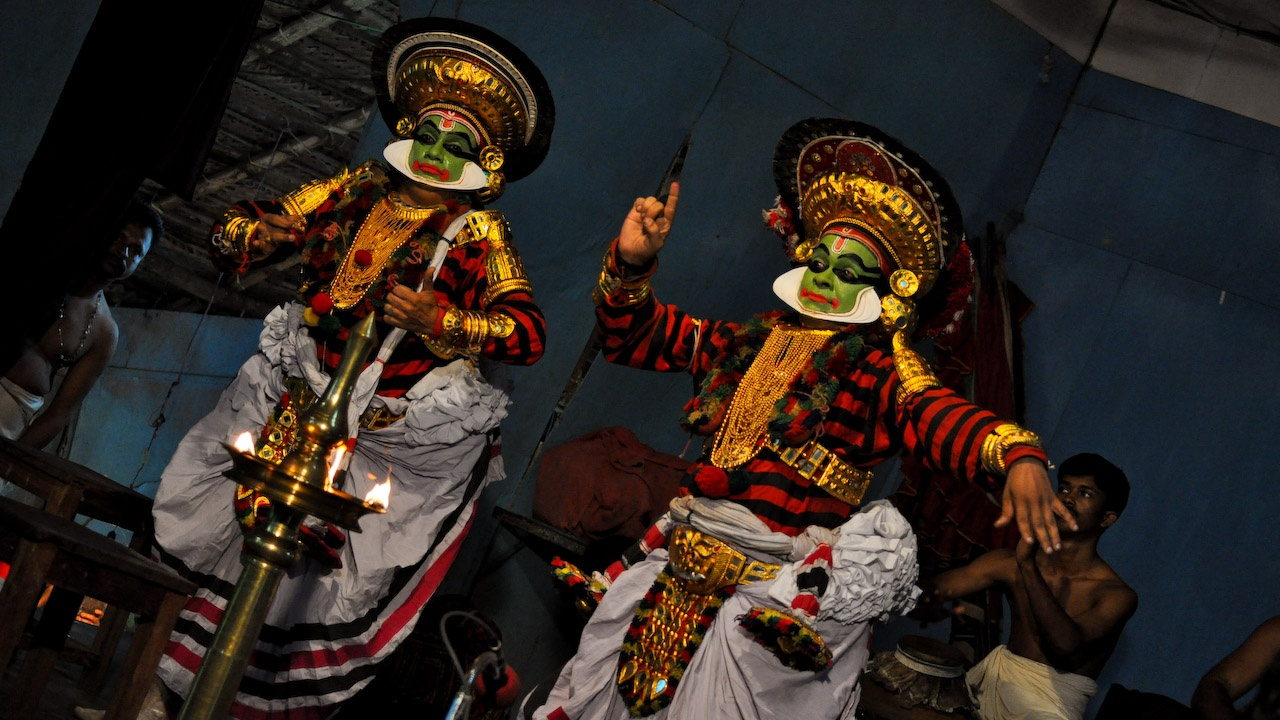
Koodiyattam

Koodiyattam, which means "mixed acting" in Malayalam, blends Sanskrit theatre performance with features of koothu. It is traditionally played in temple theatres called koothambalams. It is the only surviving art form that incorporates drama from ancient Sanskrit theater. It originated over two thousand years prior. Koodiyattam and Chakyar Koothu were among the dramatic dance worship rites performed in ancient Indian temples, particularly in Kerala. Both Koodiyattam and Chakyar Koothu originated from the ancient art form koothu, which appears multiple times in Sangam literature and epigraphs from the Pallava, Pandiyan, Chera, and Chola periods. Inscriptions about koothu are found in temples in Tanjore, Tiruvidaimaruthur, Vedaranyam, Tiruvarur, and Omampuliyur. They were viewed as an essential component of worship services, alongside the singing of Tevaram and Prabandam hymns.

Ancient kings are among those mentioned as creators of works for these services. There is evidence of these throughout the ancient subcontinent during the Chola and Pallava dynasties. Rajasimha, a Pallava king, is credited with writing the Tamil play "Kailasodharanam," which tells the story of Ravana becoming the target of Siva's wrath and being neutralized without mercy as a result.

Kulasekhara Varma, a medieval ruler of the Chera Perumal dynasty, is believed to have reformed koodiyattam by bringing Vidusaka to the local language and organizing the play's presentation into well-defined sections. He authored two plays, Subhadradhananjayam and Tapatisamvarana, and arranged for their theater performance with the assistance of a Brahmin friend Thozhan. These plays are still being performed. Aside from these, the plays traditionally performed include Ascaryacudamani of Saktibhadra, Kalyanasaugandhika of Nilakantha, Bhagavadajjuka of Bodhayana, Nagananda of Harsa, and several plays attributed to Bhasa, including Abhiseka and Pratima.

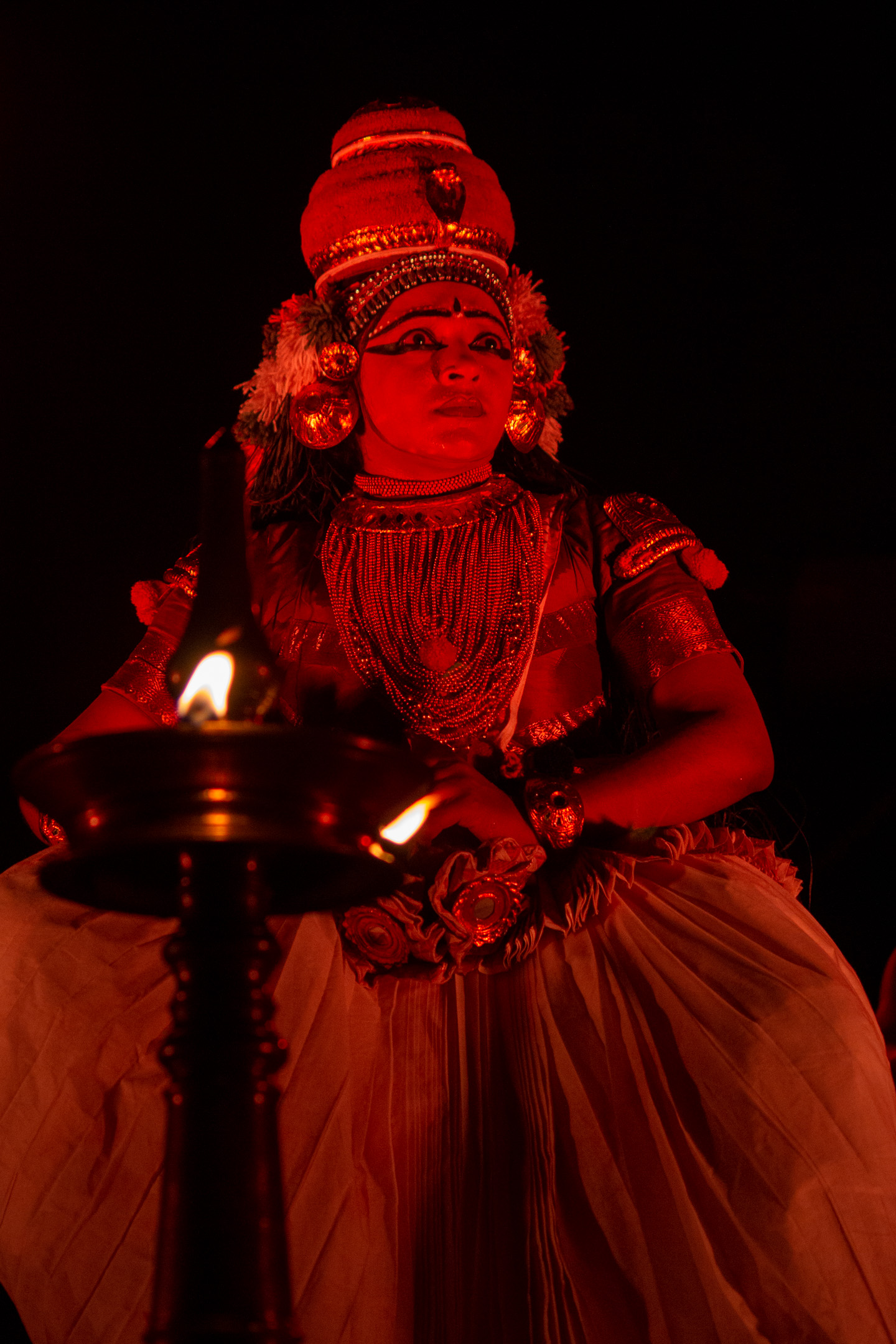
Koodiyattam performer Kapila Venu

== Instruments ==
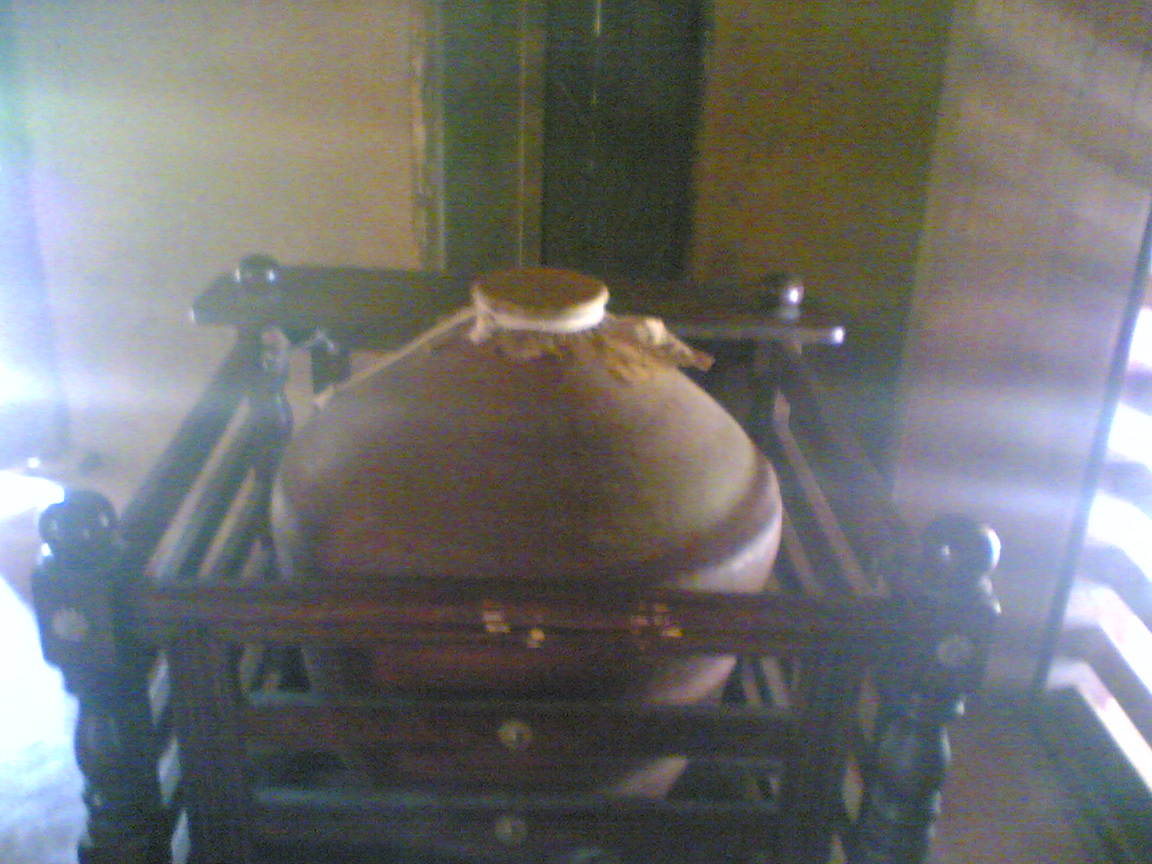
Mizhavu kept in a mizhavana (a wooden box made especially to keep mizhavu)

Traditionally, the main musical instruments used in koodiyattam are the mizhavu, kuzhitalam, edakka, kurumkuzhal, and sankhu. The mizhavu, the most prominent of these, is a percussion instrument that is played by a person of the Ambalavas Nambiar caste, accompanied by Nangyaramma playing the kuzhithalam (a type of cymbal).

== Performance style ==
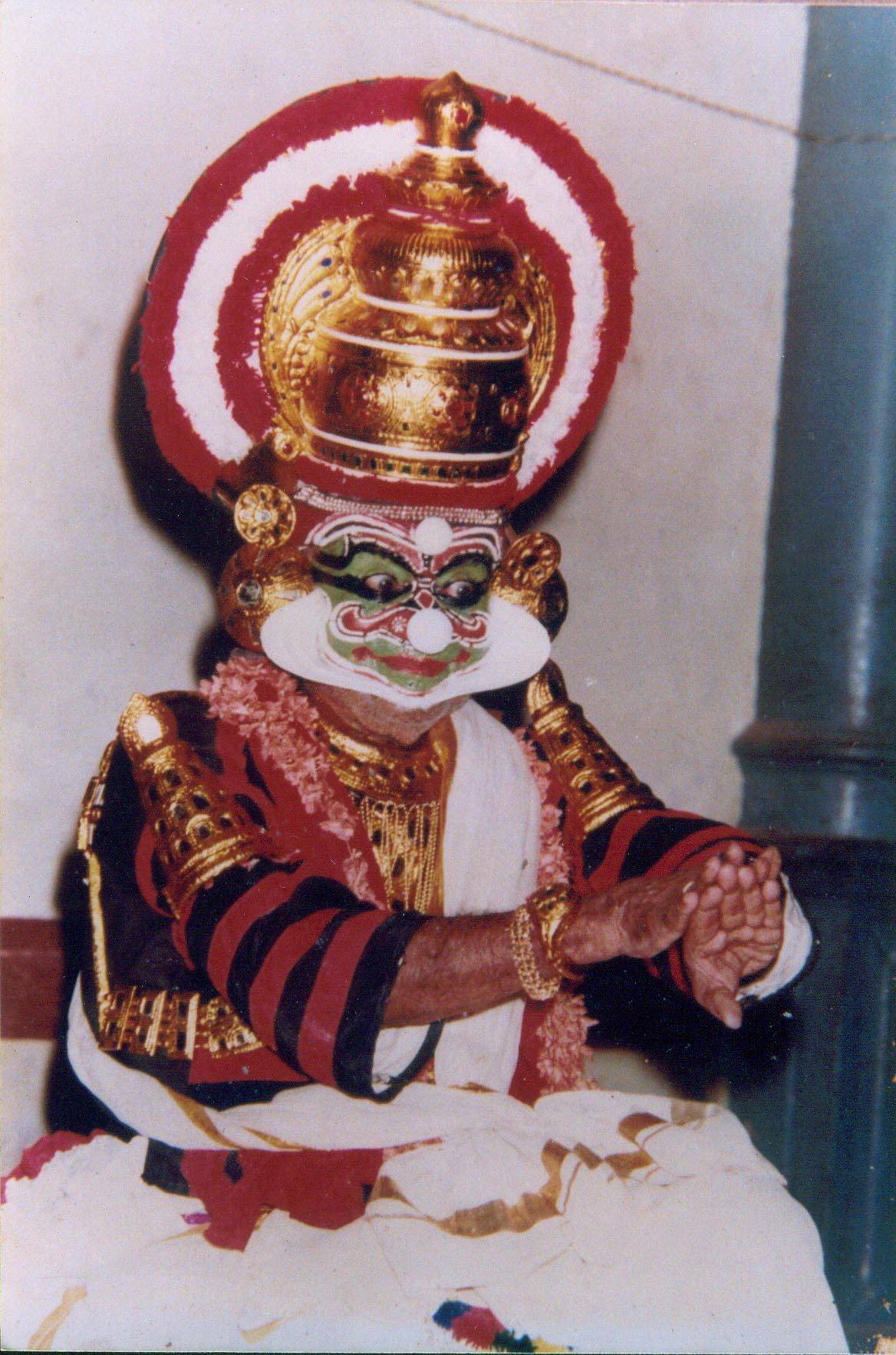
Koodiyattam Guru Mani Madhava Chakyar as "Ravana"

Traditionally, koodiyattam has been performed by Chakyars (a subcaste of Kerala Hindus) and by Nangyaramma (women of the Ambalavasi Nambiar caste). The name "koodiyattam", meaning playing or performing together, is thought to refer to the presence of multiple actors on stage who act in rhythm with the beats of the mizhavu drummers. Alternatively, it may also be a reference to a common practice in Sanskrit drama where a single actor who has performed solo for several nights is joined by another.

The main actor is a Chakyar who performs the ritualistic koothu and koodiyattam inside the temple or in the koothambalam. Chakyar women, Illotammas, are not allowed to participate. Instead, the female roles are played by Nangyaramma. Koodiyattam performances are often lengthy and elaborate, ranging from 12 to 150 hours spread across several nights. A complete Koodiyattam performance consists of three parts. The first of these is the purappadu where an actor performs a verse along with the nritta aspect of dance. Following this is the nirvahanam where the actor, using abhinaya, presents the mood of the main character of the play. Then there is the nirvahanam, a retrospective, which takes the audience up to the point where the actual play begins. The final part of the performance is the koodiyattam, which is the play itself. While the first two parts are solo acts, koodiyattam can have as many characters as are required to perform on the stage.

The elders of the Chakyar community traditionally taught the artform to their youngsters. It was performed only by Chakyars until the 1950s. In 1955, Guru Mani Madhava Chakyar performed Kutiyattam outside the temple for the first time, for which he faced many problems from the hardline Chakyar community. In his own words:

My own people condemned my action (performing Koothu and Kutiyattam outside the precincts of the temples), Once, after I had given performances at Vaikkom, they even thought about excommunicating me. I desired that this art should survive the test of time. That was precisely why I ventured outside the temple.

In 1962, under the leadership of art and Sanskrit scholar V. Raghavan, Sanskrit Ranga of Madras invited Guru Mani Madhava Chakyar to perform koodiyattam in Chennai. Thus for the first time in history koodiyattam was performed outside Kerala. They presented over three nights koodiyattam scenes from the plays Abhiṣeka, Subhadrādhanañjaya and Nāgānda.

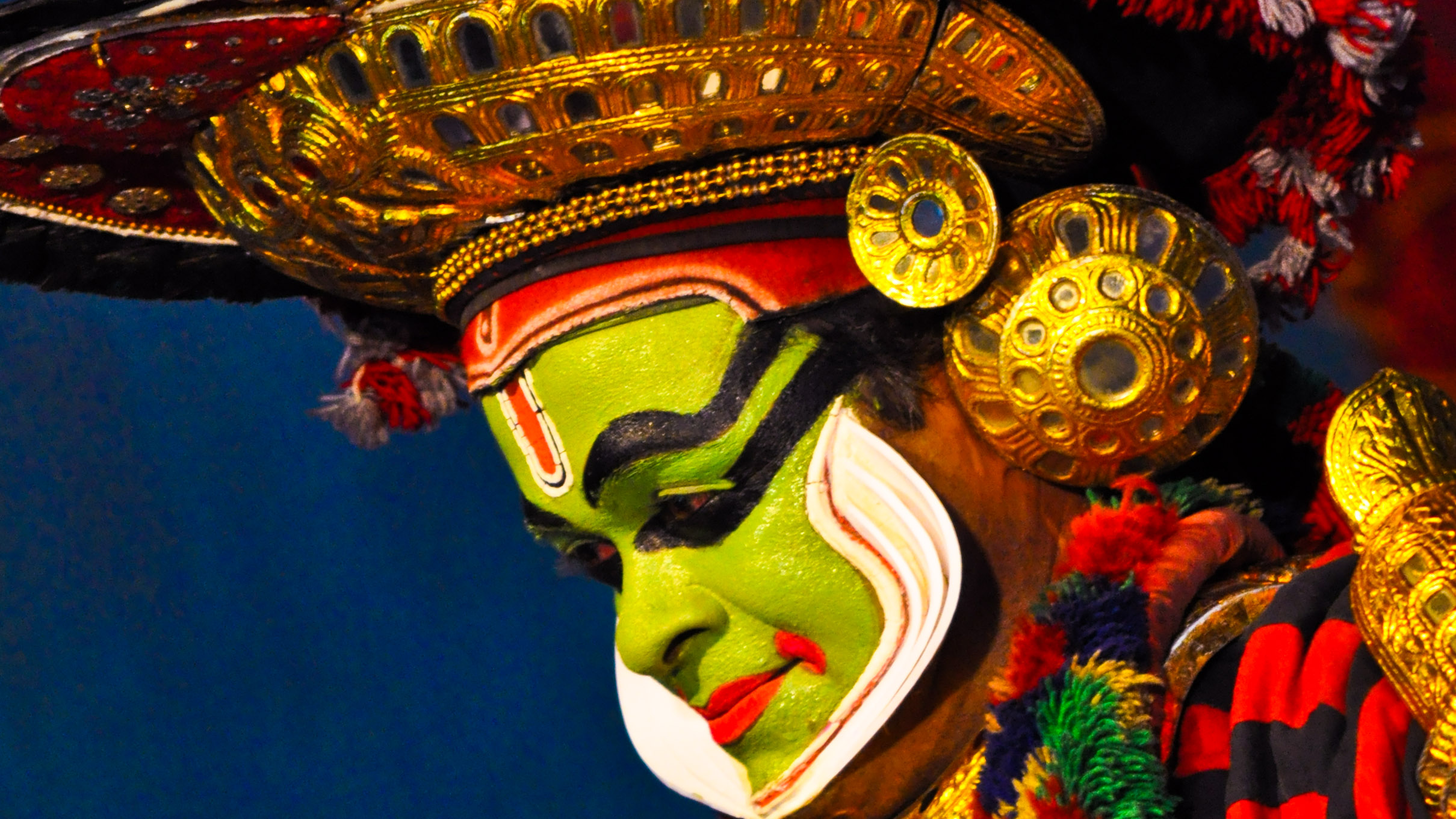
Koodiyattam face makeup

In the early 1960s Maria Christoffer Byrski, a Polish student doing research in Indian theatres at Banaras Hindu University, studied koodiyattam with Mani Madhava Chakyar and became the first non-Chakyar/nambiar to learn the art form. He stayed in Guru's home at Killikkurussimangalam and studied in the traditional Gurukula way.

== Noted artists ==
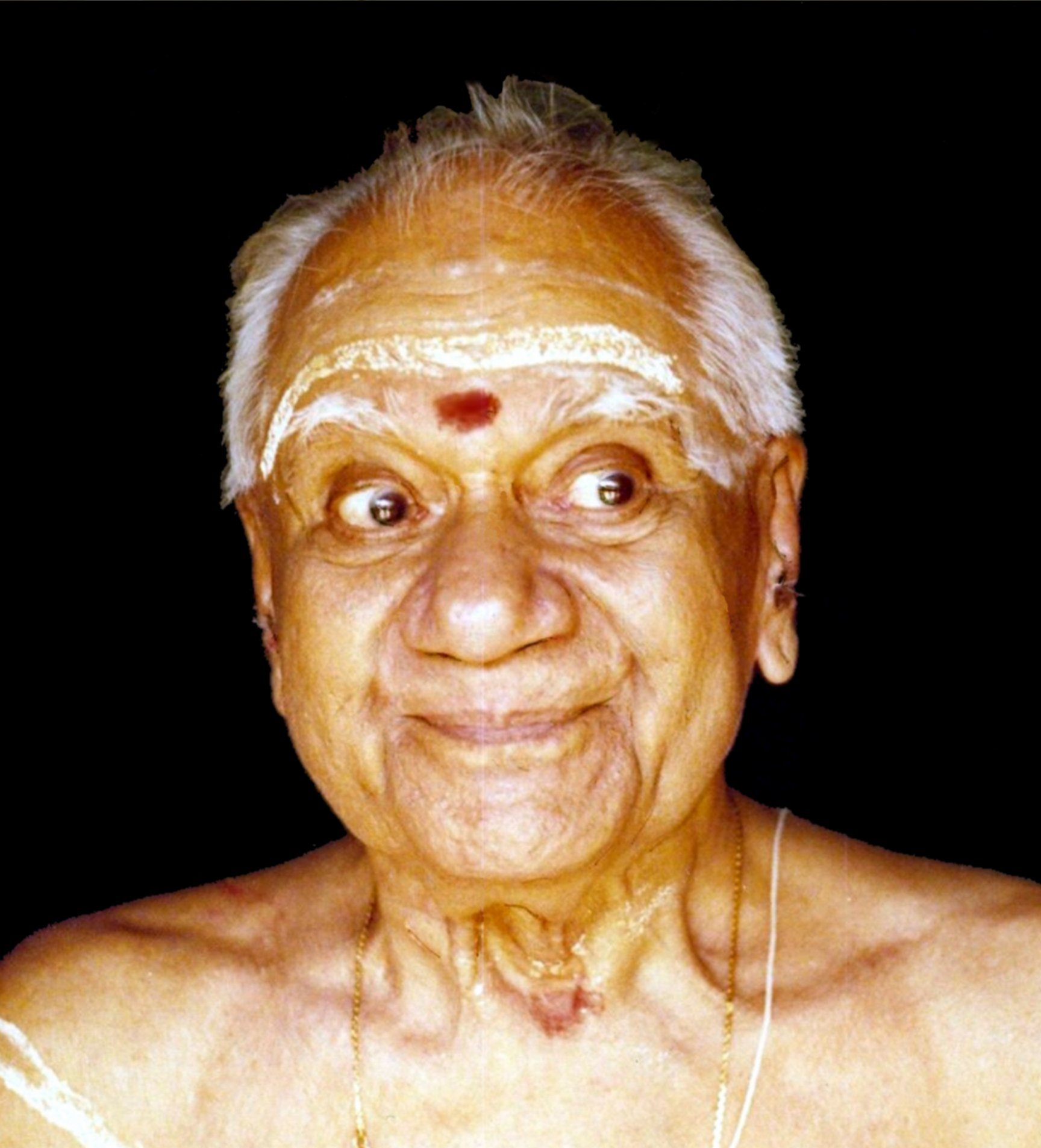
The rasa (emotion) called Sringaram (lust), performed by Guru Mani Madhava Chakyar

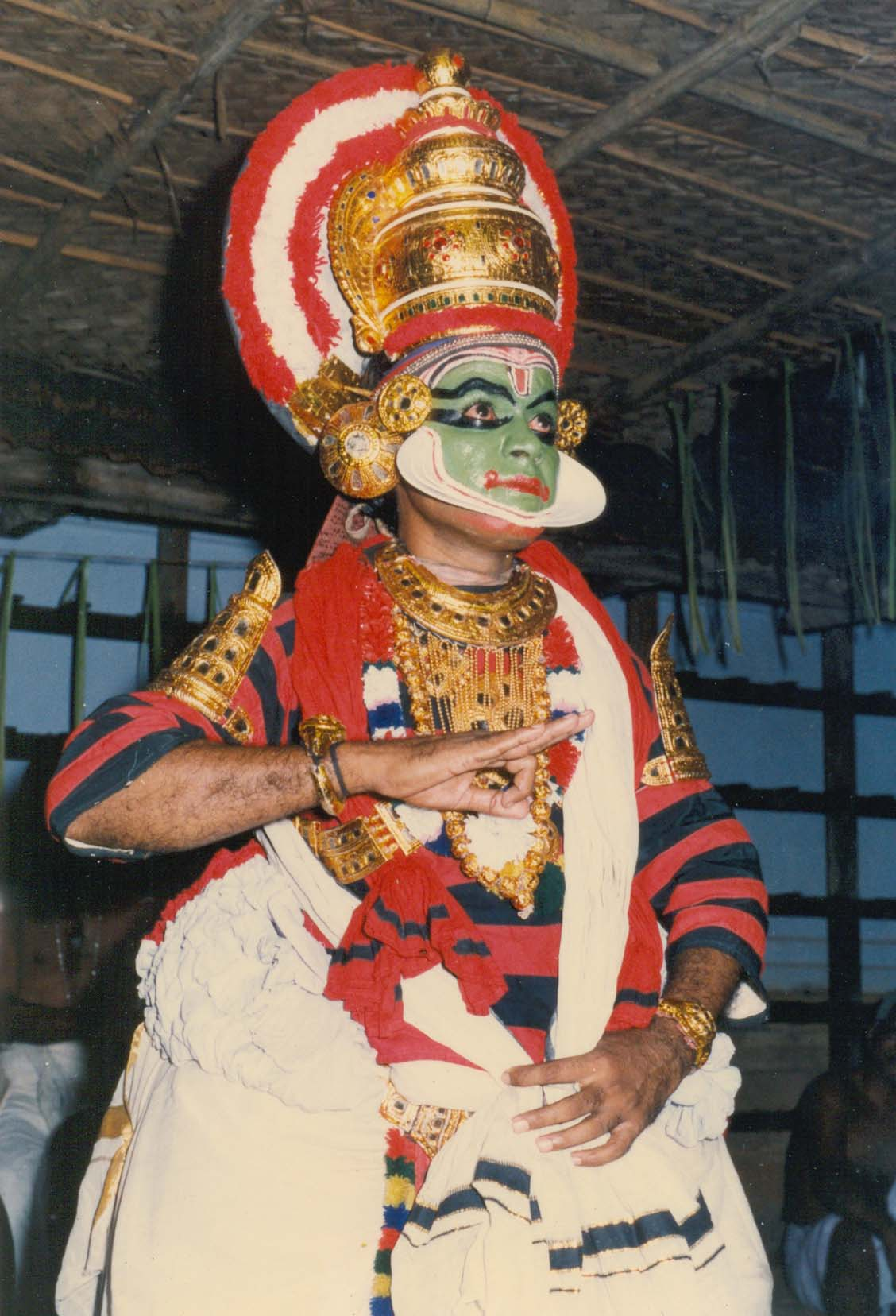
Nayaka (Hero) King Udayana in Swapnavasavadattam Kutiyattam

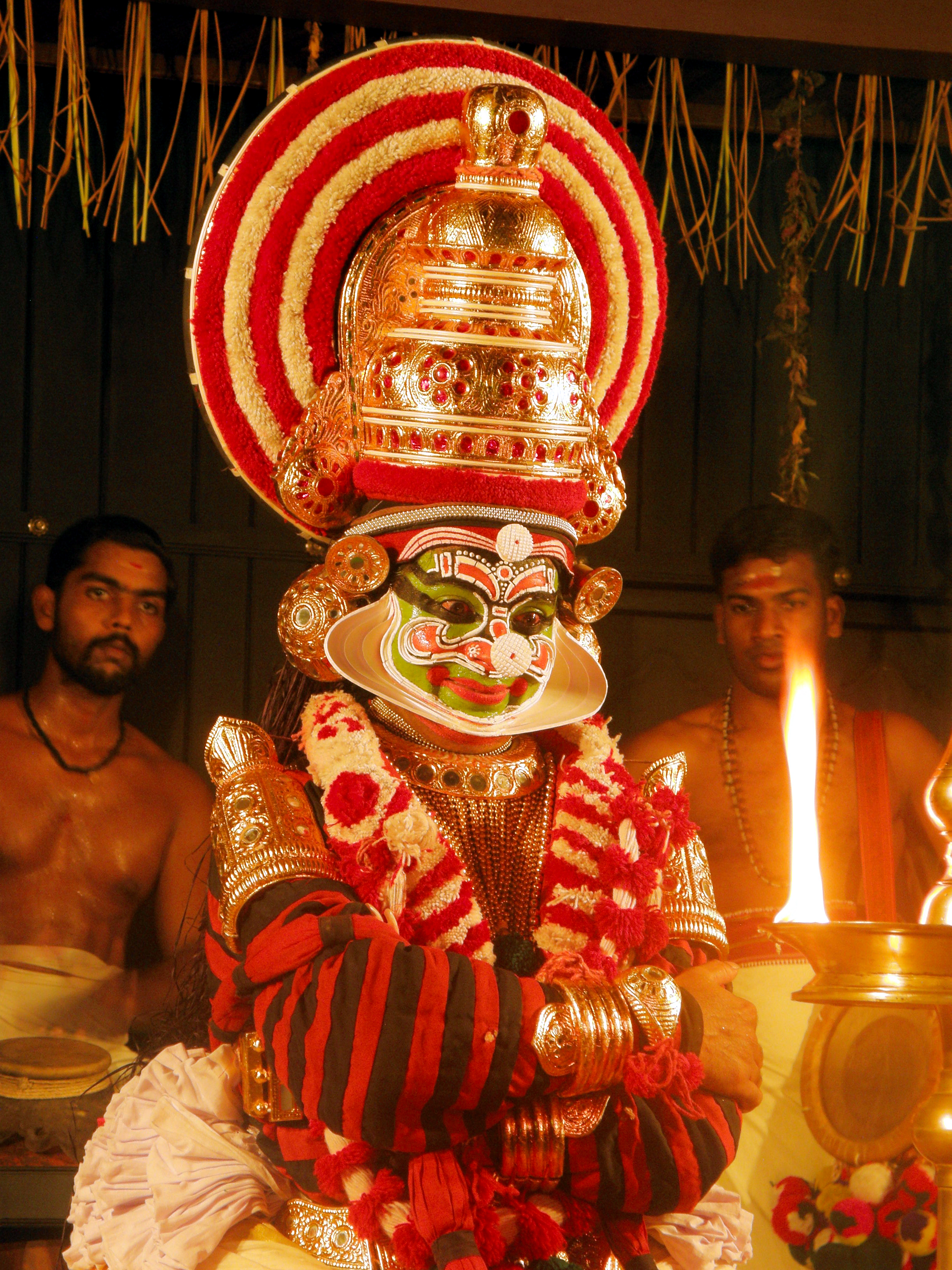
Margi Madhu as Ravanan at Nepathya

- Mani Madhava Chakyar
- Ammannur Madhava Chakyar, who in the 1980s became one of the first koodiyattam performers to present this art to an international audience.
- Moozhikkulam Kochukuttan Chakyar, who in 1981 became the first Residential Guru at Margi, an institution promoting traditional art forms of Kerala. He was a cousin of Ammannur Madhava Chakyar.
- Mani Damodara Chakyar, who is Mani Madhava Chakkiar's disciple and nephew, is also a performer of traditional devotional koodiyattams.

== Decline ==
Koodiyattam traditionally was an exclusive art form performed in special venues called koothambalams in Hindu temples and access to these performances was restricted to only caste Hindus. Also, performances can take up to forty days to complete. The collapse of the feudal order in the nineteenth century in Kerala curtailed the patronage of koodiyattam artists, and they faced serious financial difficulties. Following a revival in the early twentieth century, Koodiyattam is once again facing a lack of funding, leading to a crisis in the profession.

UNESCO has called for the creation of a network of koodiyattam institutions and gurukalams to promote the transmission of the art form to future generations and for the development of new audiences besides fostering greater academic research in it. Natanakairali in Irinjalakuda is one of the most prominent institutions in the field of koodiyattam revival. The Margi Theatre Group in Thiruvananthapuram is another organisation dedicated to the revival of kathakali and koodiyattom in Kerala.

=== Institution and awards ===
Nepathya Centre institute established in 1998 is a notable leading ensemble dedicated to preserving and promoting the ancient theatrical tradition of Koodiyattam and related art forms in Moozhikkulam.

The Sangeet Natak Akademi, India's National Academy for Music, Dance and Drama, has awarded the Sangeet Natak Akademi Award, the highest award for performing artists, to kutiyattam artists like Kalamandalam Sivan Namboodiri (2007), Painkulam Raman Chakyar (2010) and Painkulam Damodara Chakyar (2012).

== See also ==
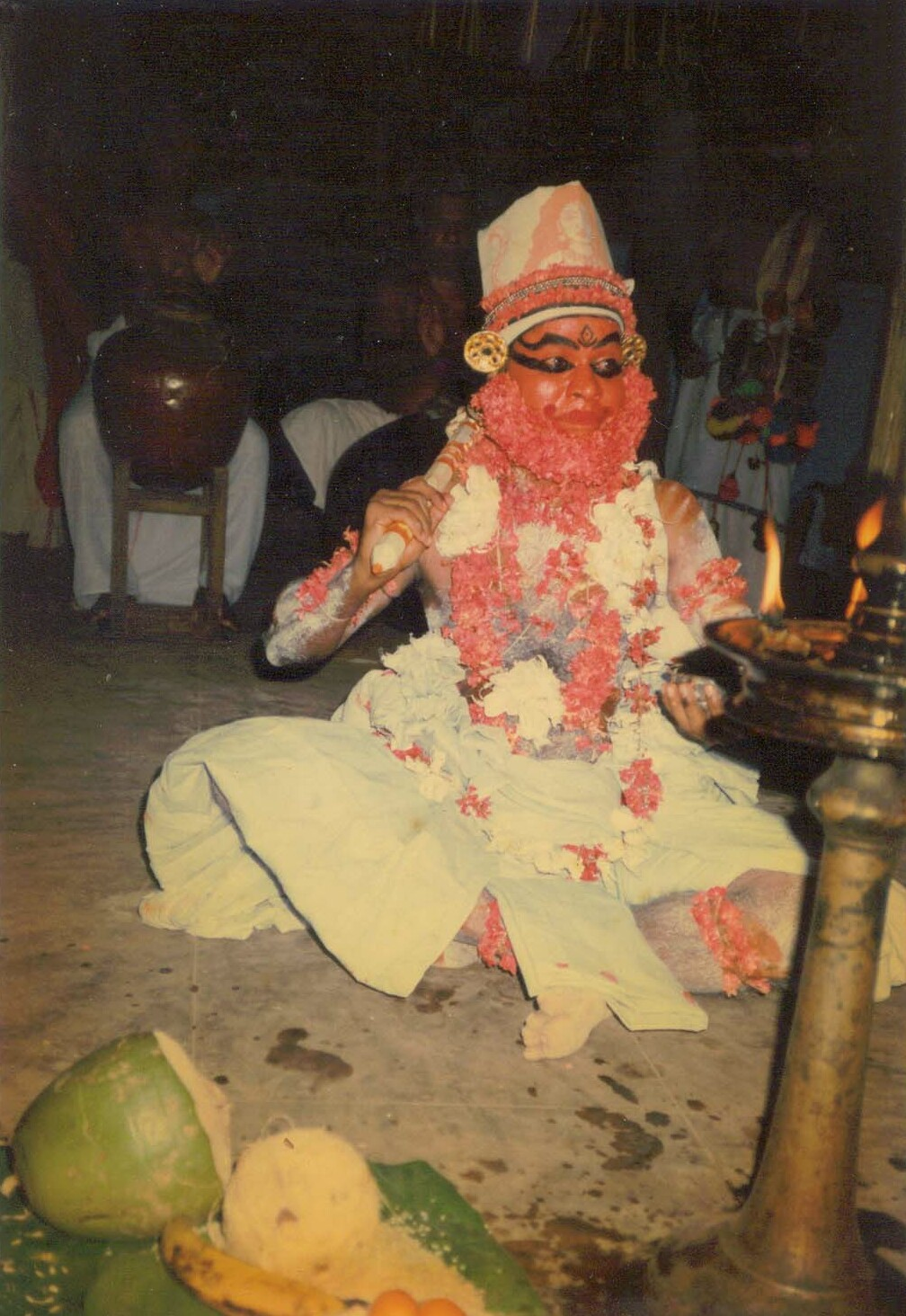
Mattavilasam, the devotional ritualistic koodiyattam performed at temples in northern Kerala like Kottiyoor. The artist is Mani Damodara Chakyar.

- Koothu
- Margi Sathi
- Arts of Kerala
- Mohiniyattam
- Thulall
- Parayan Thullal
- Moozhikkulam Kochukuttan Chakyar
