= Kalamandalam Sivan Namboodiri =

Koodiyattam artist

- Born: 1950 (age 75–76); Shornur, Thrissur, Kerala, India
- Occupation: Koodiyattam performer
- Awards: Padma Shri; Kerala Sangeetha Nataka Akademi Award; Margi Gold Medal; Natyakala Ratnam Award; Mrinalini Sarabhai Award; Smithsonian Institution Certificate of appreciation
- Website: Official web site

Kalamandalam Sivan Namboodiri is an Indian classical theatre performer, the first person from outside chakyar community to practice Koodiyattam, from Kerala. He was awarded the Padma Shri, in 2012, for his contributions to the art of Koodiyattam, by the Government of India.

== Biography ==
My venture in Koodiyattam was accidental, says Kalamandalam Sivan Namboodiri, It happened thanks to Kathakali maestro Kalamandalam Ramankutty Nair and my guru, late Painkulam Raman Chakyar

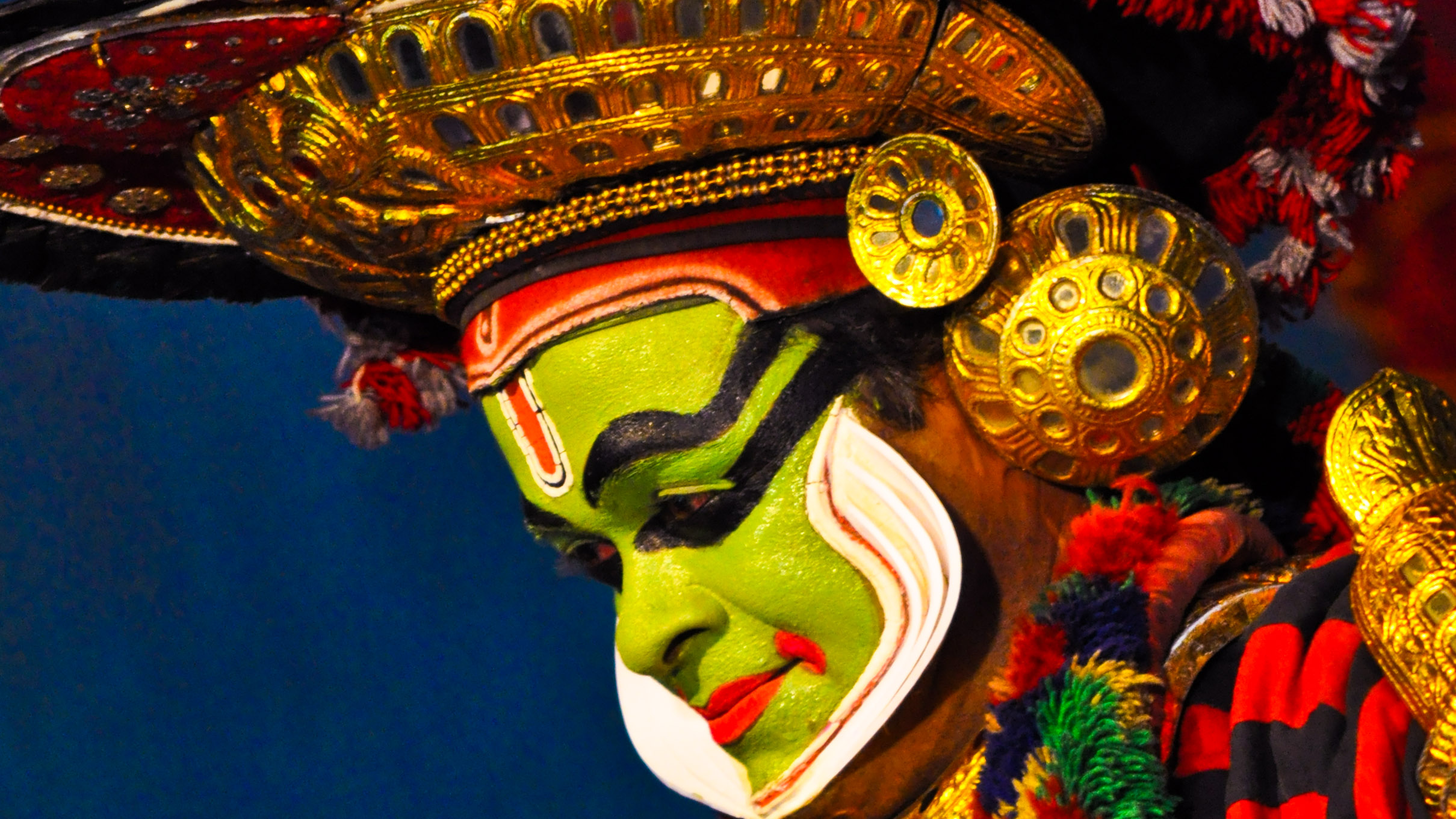
Sivan Namboodiri with Koodiyattam face makeup

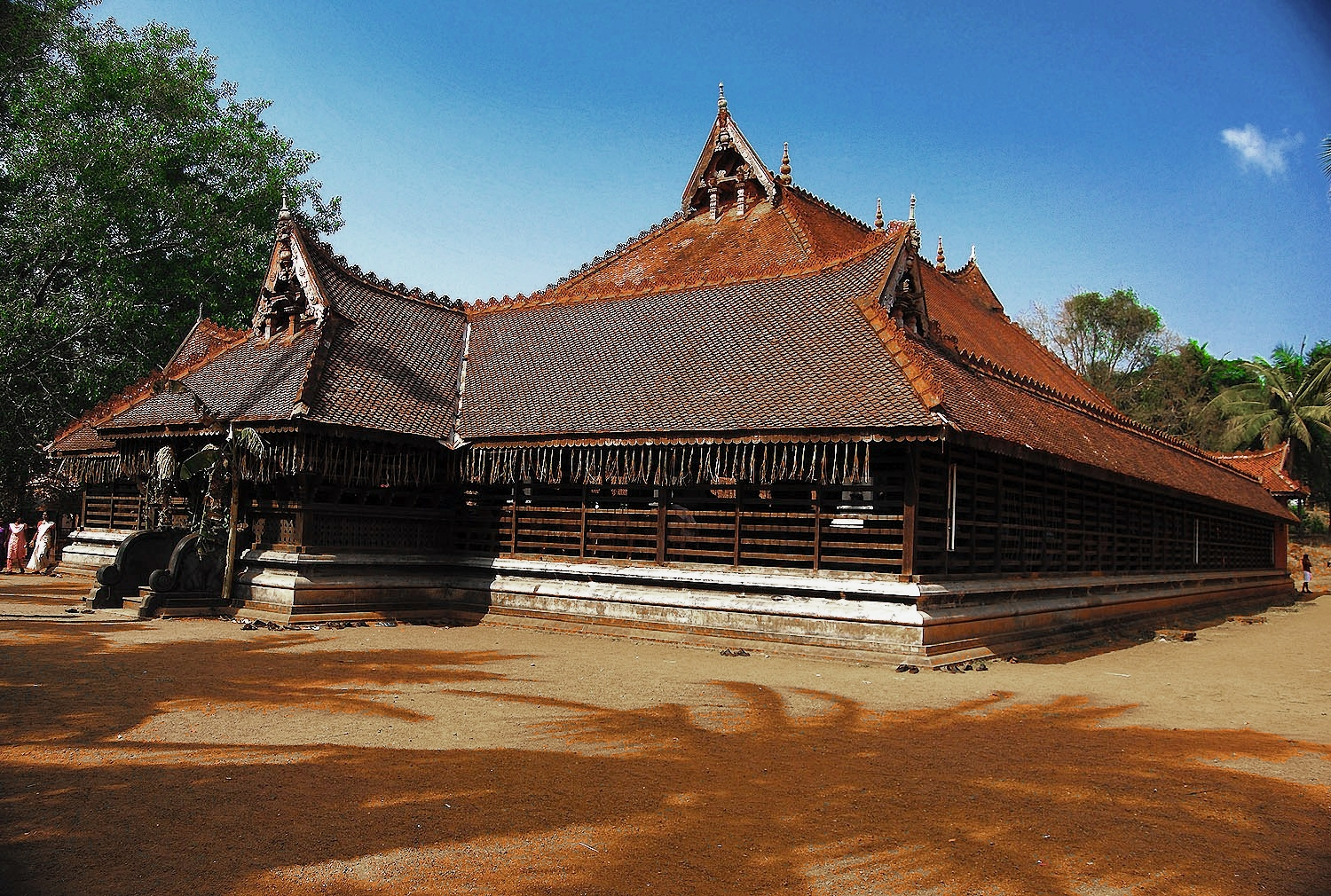
Koothambalam at Kerala Kalamandalam

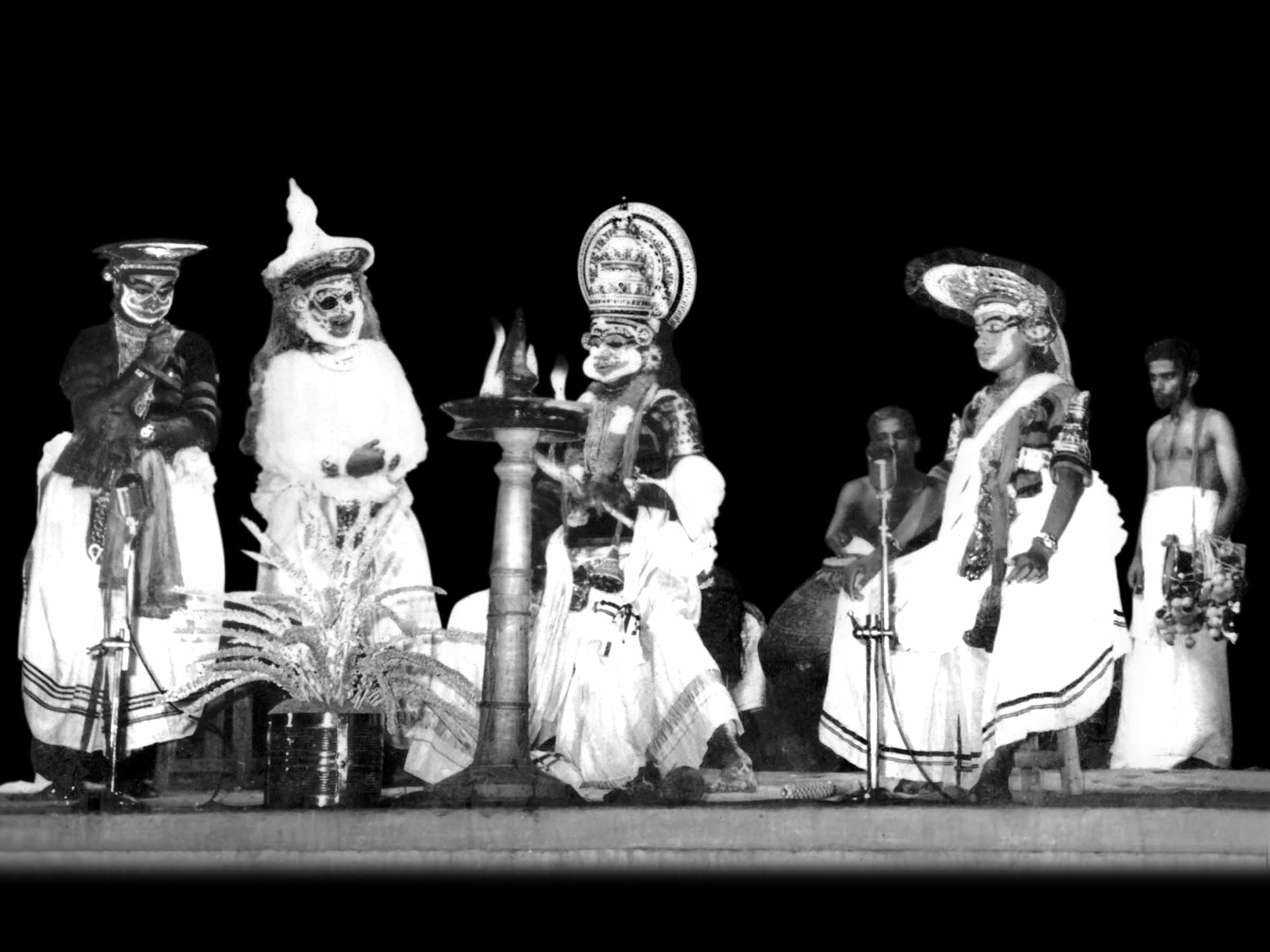
Guru Mani Madhava Chakyar and his troupe performing Thoranayudham (part of Bhasa's play Abhiṣeka Nataka based on the epic Ramayana) Koodiyattam (1962, Chennai). It was the first ever Koodiyattam performance outside Kerala.

Sivan Namboodiri was born in 1950 to Ammankotu Manakkal Madhavan Namboodiri, a farmer and Devaki Antharjanam, as the youngest of their three sons, at Shornur, Palakkad, in the south Indian state of Kerala. He had his early schooling at Kanayam and Vadanamkurissi, but, being a poor student, had to drop out of school at Grade 7. He joined Kerala Kalamandalam, in 1965, at the age of 14, to learn Kathakali.

During that period, the renowned Koodiyattam maestro, Painkulam Raman Chakyar, was in the process of setting up the Koodiyattam department at Kalamandalam and, on the insistence of Vallathol Narayana Menon, the founder of the institute, and K. N. Pisharody, Sivan changed his course to study Koodiyattam, as one of the two students of the first batch of Koodiyattam. Sivan was fortunate to learn the art from the masters such as Painkulam Raman Chakyar, Kalamandalam Ramankutty Nair (Kathakali thespian), and Kalamandalam Krishnankutty Poduval (Chenda exponent).

After the initial study of 6 years, Sivan enrolled for the post graduate course of 2 years at Kalamandalam. This was followed by an advanced course in New Delhi, with the help of a scholarship from the Department of Culture, Government of India.

In 1975, he joined Kerala Kalamandalam as an instructor in the Faculty of Koodiyattam and, at present, is the most experienced teacher there. In 1980, University of Calicut invited him to be a part of the School of Drama where is working as a visiting professor since then.

Sivan Namboodiri is married to Indira, Sanskrit teacher at a local school and the couple has two children. The family lives in Palakkad.

== Career highlights ==
The highlight of Sivan Namboodiri's career came in Paris, when he performed two acts, Kailasoddhaaranam (Ravana lifting Mount Kailasa) and Parvathiviraham (Goddess Parvathi's separation from Lord Siva), before a UNESCO jury to select art forms to be considered for inclusion in UNESCO's Masterpiece of the Oral and Intangible Heritage of Humanity. The jury approved the inclusion of Koodiyattam subsequent to the show.

He also performed in Germany at the Cologne Festival in 1980.

== Legacy ==
Sivan Namboodiri was the first artist from outside the chakyar community to perform Koodiyattam. He is also considered as the first person to learn Koodiyattam in an institutional way; till his entry, Koodiyattam was taught under the gurukula system. Another first attributed to Sivan Namboodiri is that he was the first male to perform Nangyar Koothu which was the domain of nangiars, the ladies from Nambiar community. He is also credited with revolutionizing the Koodiyattam costumes and accompanying music.

== Awards and recognitions ==
2007 He Got Sangeet Natak academy award for Kutiyattam

- Padma Shri - 2012
- Margi Gold Medal for Best Young Koodiyattam Performer - 1970
- Margi Gold Medal for Best Young Koodiyattam Performer - 1971
- Margi Gold Medal for Best Young Koodiyattam Performer - 1972
- Natyakala Ratnam Award of Calcutta Malayalee Association - 1992
- Junior Fellowship - the Ministry of Human Resource Development, Department of Culture, New Delhi - 1995
- Kerala Sangeetha Nataka Akademi Award for Koodiyattam - 1998
- Mrinalini Sarabhai Award for Classical excellence - 1999 (he is the first recipient of the award)
- Certificate of appreciation from the Smithsonian Institution, Washington

== Works ==
Invis Multimedia has brought out an almost hour-long video on the performance of Sivan Namboodiri.

- Kalamandalam Sivan Namboothiri (2005). Kutiyattam Kailasodharanam. Invis Multimedia. ISBN 8188698083.

== See also ==
- Koodiyattam
- Mani Madhava Chakyar
- Ammannur Madhava Chakyar
- Painkulam Raman Chakyar
- Mani Damodara Chakyar
- Ammannur Rajaneesh Chakyar
- Natyakalpadrumam
- Arts of Kerala
