= Koothambalam =

Ritualistic halls in Kerala, India

Koothambalam or Kuttampalam (Kuṭṭampalam) meaning temple theatre or play house by scholars is a closed hall for staging Koothu ( (Kūttu), Nangiar koothu( (Kūttu) and Koodiyattam(Kūṭiyāṭṭam), the ancient ritualistic art forms of Kerala, India. Koothambalams are said to be constructed according to the guide lines given in the chapter 2 of Nātyasāstra of Bharata Muni. The stage within the hall is considered to be as sacred as the temple sanctum. It is constructed within the cloister of the Temple; more precisely within the pancaprakaras of the temple. The prescribe location is between the prakaras of bahyahara and maryada. In Kerala tradition it is considered as one among the pancaprasadas of a temple complex. Its dimension vary from temple to temple. A square platform with a separate pyramidal roof supported by pillars in the center called natyamandapam is constructed as s separate structure within the large hall of Koothampalam. The floor of the hall is divided into two equal halves and one part is for performance (including stage, instruments, green room etc.) and other half for seating audience. During the performance, the stage is decorated with fruit-bearing plantains, bunches of coconuts and fronds of the coconut palm. A para filled with rice is placed on the stage. A nilavilakku with three thiri is used for lighting. The mizhavu, a percussion instrument for accompanying Koothu, is placed within a railed enclosure, with a high seat for the drummer( belonging to nampiar community).

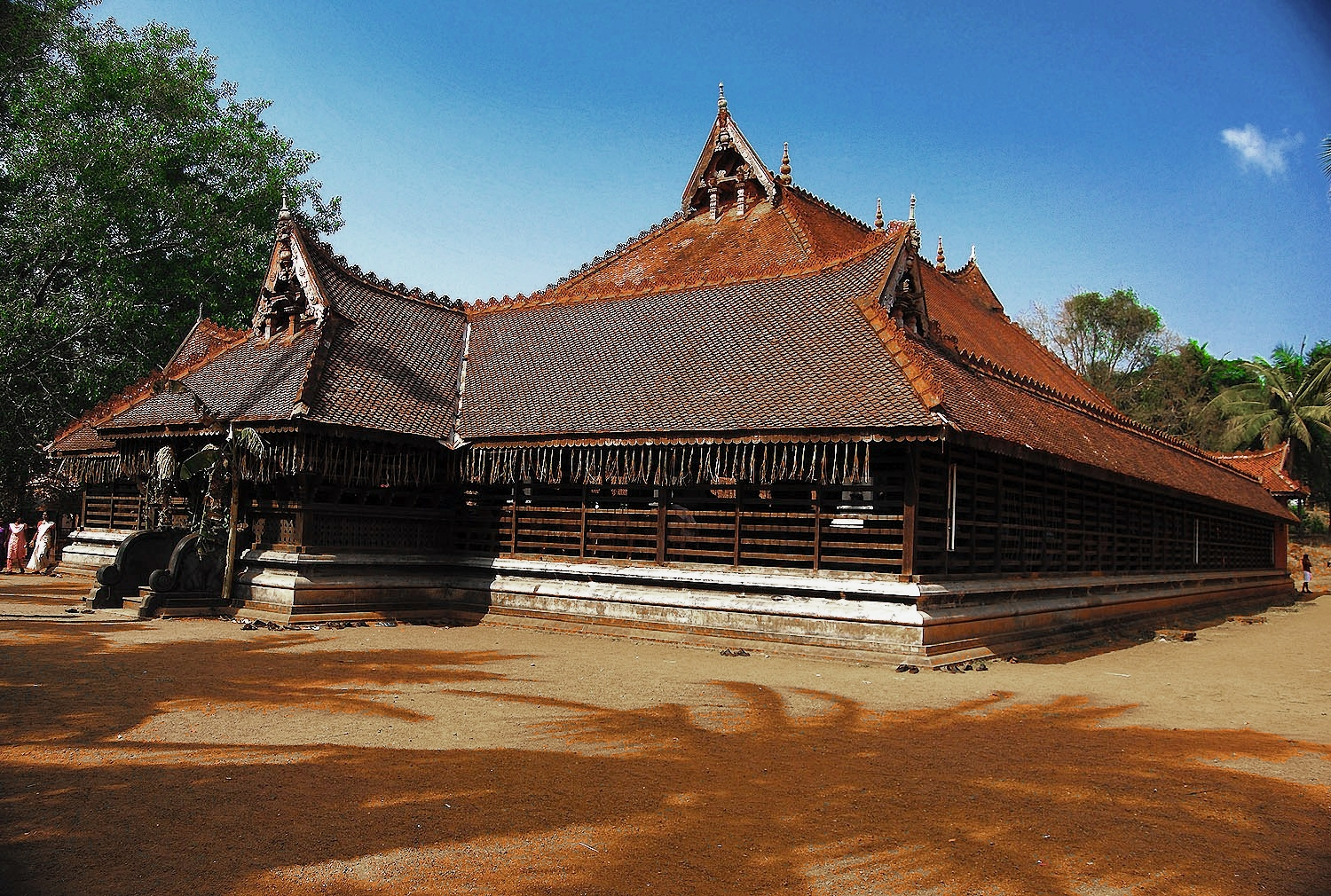
Koothambalam

Only men from the Chakyar community are allowed to perform Koothu and Koodiyattam inside the Koothambalam. The women of the Ambalavasi-Nambiar caste (Nangyarammas), play Nangyar Koothu and the female characters of Koodiyattam. The traditional Ambalavasi-Nambiars play the mizhavu.

Famous temples with Koothambalams include the Haripad Sree Subrahmanya Swamy temple, Thirunakkara Mahadeva Temple - Kottayam, Sreekrishna Temple - Guruvayoor, Vadakkumnathan Temple - Trichur, Koodalmanikyam Temple - Irinjalakkuda, Mahadeva Temple - Peruvanam in Trichur District, Sree Mahadeva temple - Thiruvegappura, Thirumandhamkunnu Bhagavathi Temple - Angadippuram in Malappuram District, Thirumuzhikkulam Lakshamana Temple - near Aluva, Subramanya temple - Kidangoor, Siva Temple - Chengannur etc. The Kerala Kalamandalam, Deemed University for Art and Culture, Cheruthuruthy, Thrissur District houses a beautiful Koothambalam. Another koothambalam at Vyloppilly Samskarika Nilayam, Trivandrum which is built recently is another example built out of traditional context- i.e., outside temple premises. All these are rectangular in plan. The plan, elevation and structure of these follow the shape grammar typical to the traditional Kerala architecture following the vastu rules prescribed in thantrasamuccayam and silparatnam, the authentic texts on temple vastu.

== See also ==
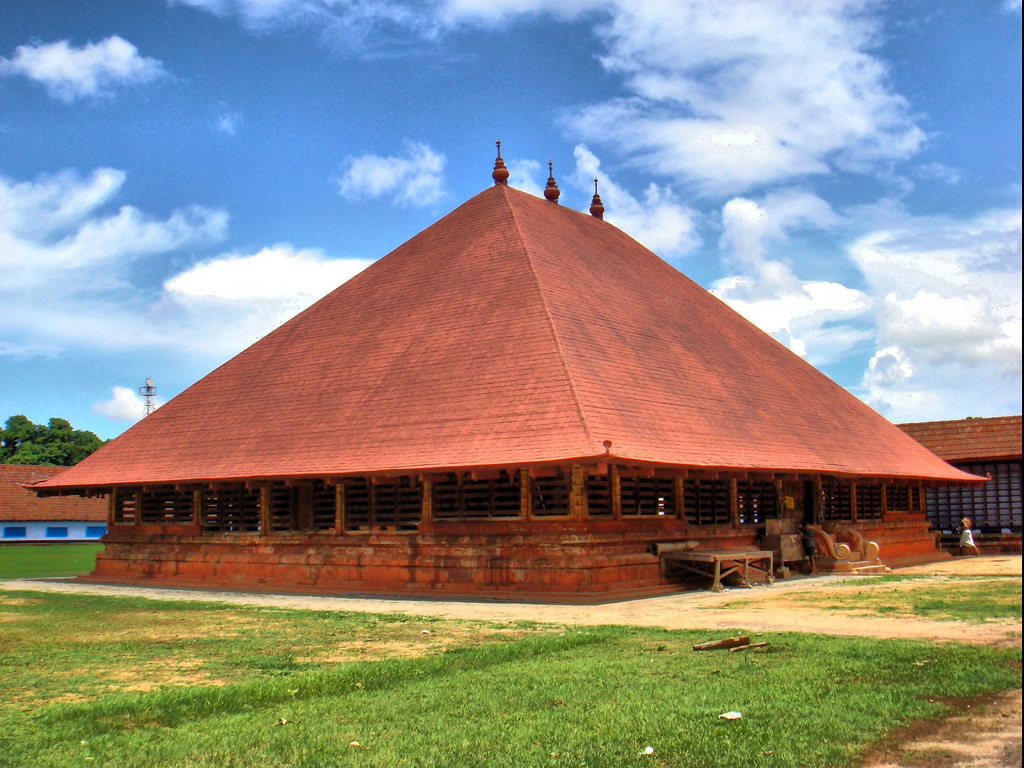
Koothambalam of Koodal Manikkam Temple

- Nātyakalpadruma
- Nambiar
- Mizhavu
- Chakyar Koothu
- Koodiyattam
- Nātyasāstra
- Mani Madhava Chakyar
- Mani Damodara Chakyar

== Other sources ==
- Vendore, Thrissur, Kerala
