= Pathakam =

Traditional Hindu art form in Kerala, India

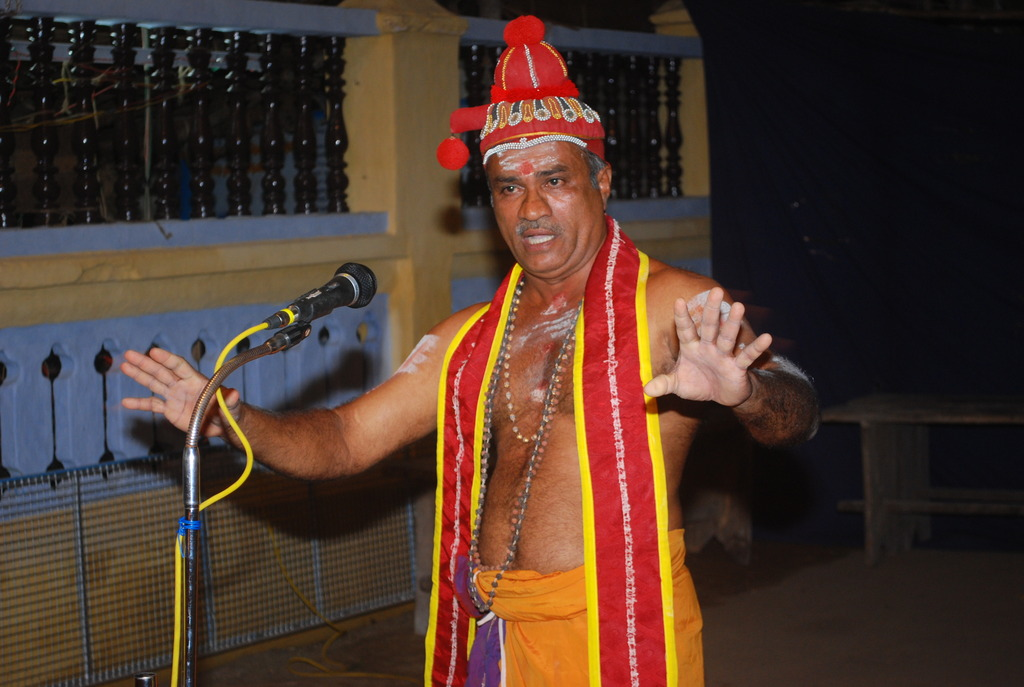
A pathakam performance at Vadayattukotta Sree Krishna Swami Temple, Kollam

Pathakam (Malayalam: പാഠകം; Sanskrit: पाठकम्; IAST:Pāṭhakam) (also transliterated as Padakam, Padhakam, Patakam, Padakom, Paadakam, Paadhakam etc.) is a traditional temple art form of Kerala in which stories from Hindu Puranas are narrated.

== Background ==
Pathakam Performance

Pathakam is considered as a typical Keralite model of mythological story telling. This art form is similar to Koothu in its presentation style. Pathakam is traditionally performed by the Ambalavasi Nambiars. It is also performed by the Chakyar community. It is a bilingual art form in which a combination of Sanskrit and Malayalam is used. The language used in Pathakam is generally referred to as Semi-Sanskrit (Ardhasamskritam).

The stage setting and costumes are very simple. Only a lighted traditional lamp known as "Nilavilakku" is used in the stage, and there is no curtain. It has only one actor. Costumes of the actor are very simple and are predominated by the red colour. The costumes of the actor include a red "Kireetam" (or a red silk garment with a knot) on the head, "Chandanatilakam" and "Kunkumatilakam" on the forehead, "Bhasmakkuri" on the body, garlands on the neck and a loose piece of upper body clothing called "Uttariyam".

The person who presents the Pathakam are eloquent in Sanskrit and Malayalam languages and have a sense of humor. There are no musical instruments or other associated rituals.

== Legend ==
This art form is believed to be originated from the Koothu. There is a legend behind this belief. Traditionally, during the Koothu performance by Chakyar, the Mizhavu, a form of drum used in Koothu, is played by Ambalavasi Nambiars. In earlier days, Koothu, in which a story is told continuously, was performed in temple from noon to evening. Once, Chakyar was unable to reach the temple for performing Koothu. After waiting for Chakyar for a long time, the Pothuval, who manages the temple matters, asked Nambiar whether he can perform the Koothu. Since, the Koothu is traditionally performed by the Chakyar community, Nambiar refused to perform Koothu by saying that only the Chakyar has birthright to stand on the Koothambalam, the traditional stage for performing Koothu, and perform Koothu. However, on the compulsion of Pothuval, he agreed to tell the story to the audience in a simple form, without entering in the Koothamblam. Nambiar performed the story-telling outside the Koothambalam, in his own style, mixing Malayalam and Sanskrit languages, with simple costumes. By the time of his performance, the Deeparadhana in that temple was over.

In modern days also, Pathakam is performed only outside the Koothambalam, somewhere near Pradakshina Marga (പ്രദക്ഷിണവഴി), after the Deeparadhana ritual. The grooming and ceremonies are different from Chakyarkoothu but the stories told are similar to those of Koothu. Like Chakyarkoothu, the Pathakam performer sometimes becomes the narrator, sometimes the character, and sometimes becomes one of the audience by conversing with them.

== Gallery ==
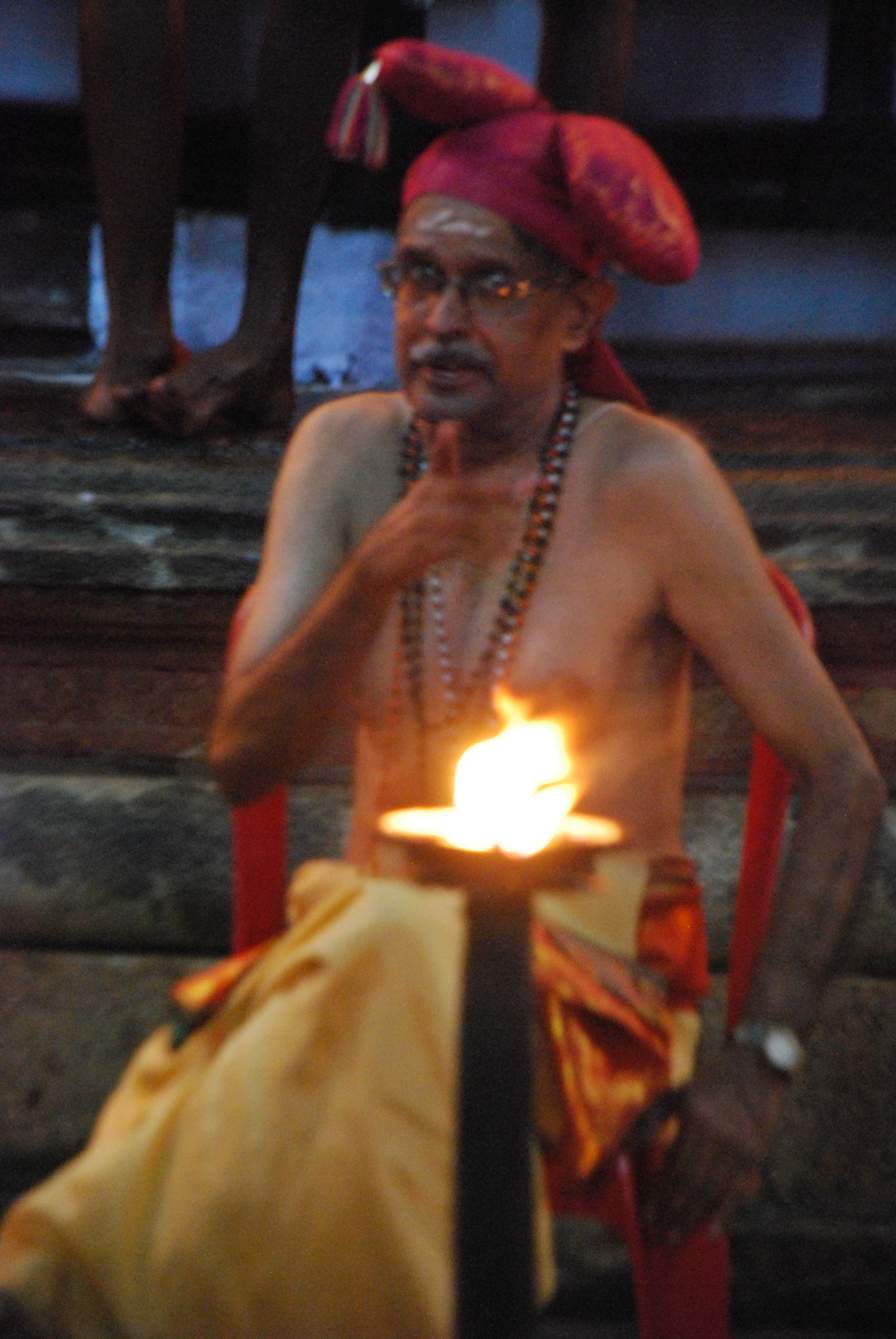
A Pathakam Performance from Koodal Manikyam Temple

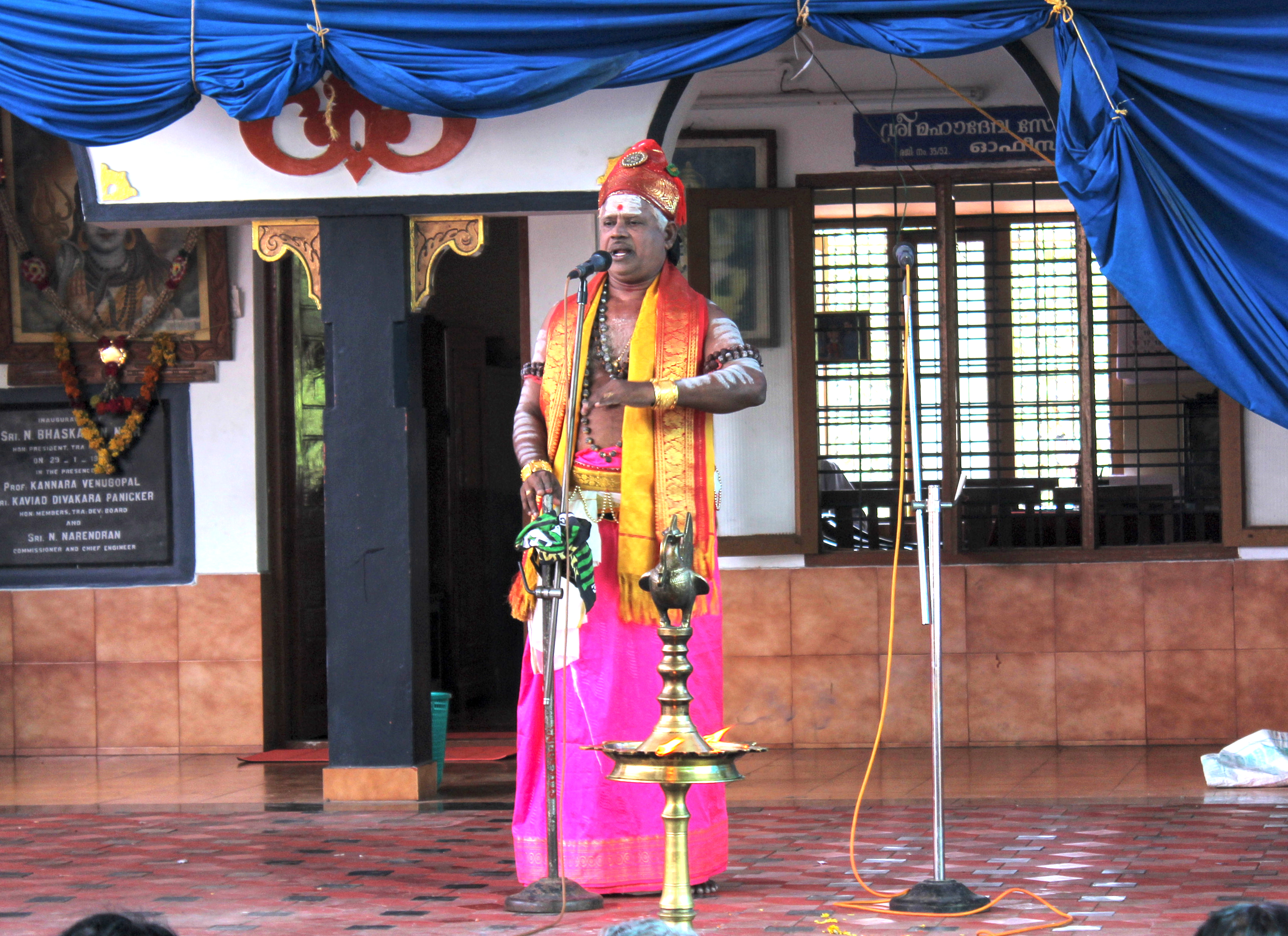
A padakam performance at Chirakkadavu Sree Mahadeva Temple

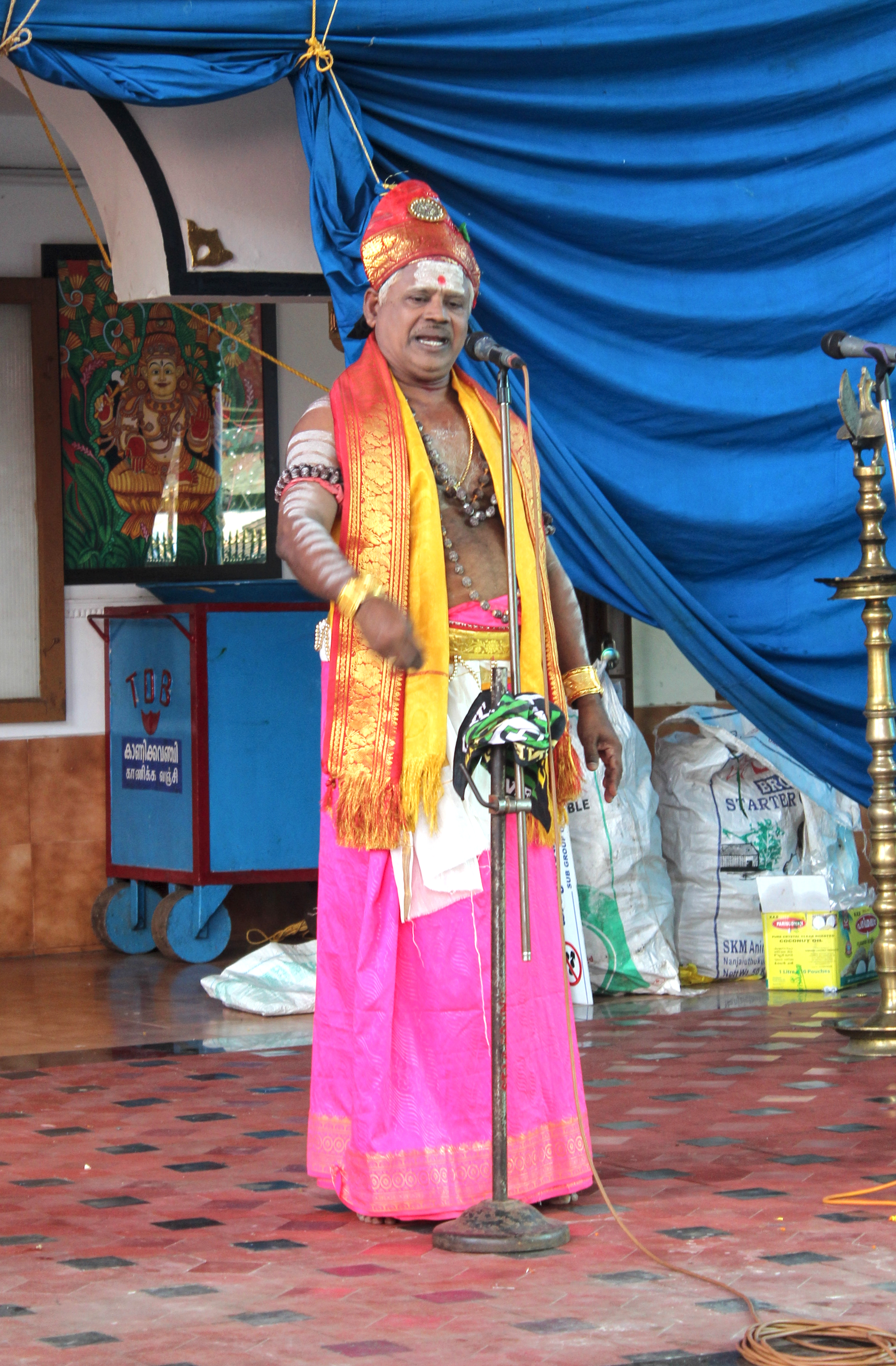
At Chirakkadavu Mahadeva Temple
