= Thidambu Nritham =

Hindu ritual dance

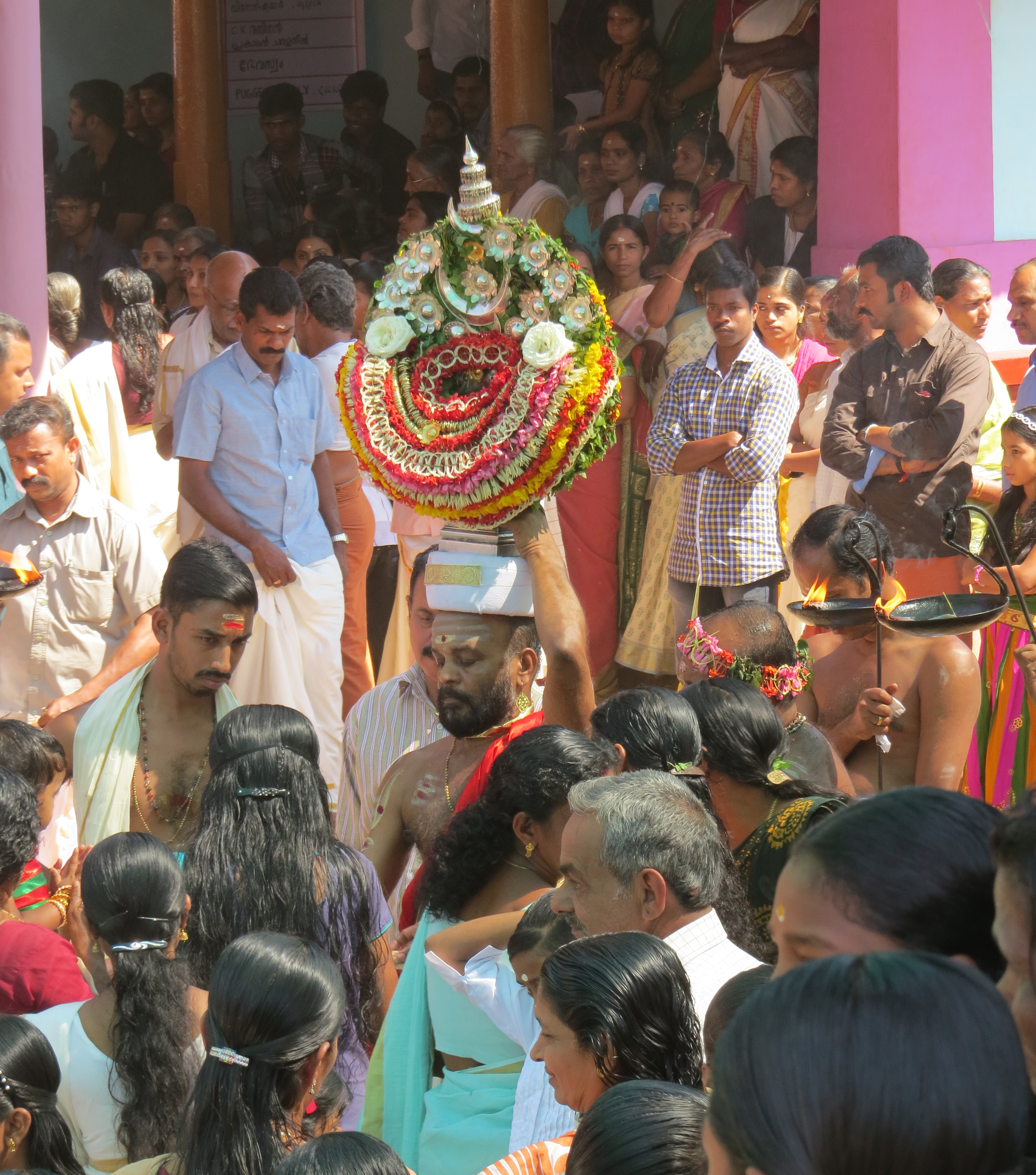
Thidambu Nritham

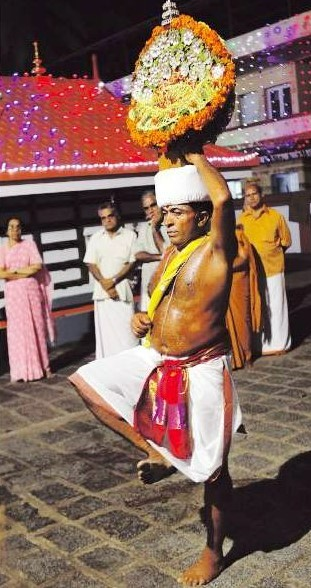
Thidambu Nritham

Thidambu Nritham (dance with the replica of the deity) is a Hindu ritual dance performed in Temples of North Malabar in India. It is mainly performed by Namboothiris and rarely other Brahmin, Thiyyar communities like Shivalli, Karhade and Havyaka.

Thidambu Nritham, as the name conveys, is a dance carrying the decorated image of the deity (thidambu) on the head.

== Elements ==
The dance is staged both inside and outside the temple. Ten persons are needed for staging this dance. The dance is performed with the decorated deity of the Devi carried on the head. Foot work is most important and this is executed to the rhythms of the drums. Thidambu nritham is commonly performed by Namboothiris (Kerala Brahmins), Thiyyars. There shall be seven musicians and two lamp-bearers. All the performers are male. The musicians are from Maarar or Pothuval community and the lamp-bearers are from Pushpakan (Unni), Nambeesan, Variar, Unnithiri communities.

=== Costumes ===
The dancer wears a costume a skirt of pleated cloth, a silk vest, earrings, bangles, necklaces and a decorated turban called ushnipeetam. The performance unfolds in various stages like Urayal, invoking the deity, Thakiladi adantha, Chembada, Pamchan etc. The dancer is usually accompanied by a group of artists, five of whom play the percussions and two hold aloft the lamps.

== History ==
This ritual art form is believed to be over 600–700 years old and follows the principles of dance laid down in Natyasasthra.This ritual is commonly performed by Namboodiris at temples in Kannur and Kasaragod of Kerala.

The origin of Thitambu Nritham cannot be easily traced. Tulu Brahmins who had migrated to the North Malabar during Kolathiri might have introduced this dance from Karnataka where a form of "Nritham" called "Darsana Bali" was in vogue. Replicas are made of bamboo with which a beautiful frame with intricate designs is created. The priestly dancer, clad in the traditional style after performing the usual rituals, comes out of the sanctorum, and standing under the flag, holds aloft the replica weighing about 10 kg on his head and starts the divine dance.

Another legend goes like this : A Namboothiri used to sit in meditation under a nux vomica tree [Botanical name : Stricnos nuxvomica; Mal. - "Kaanjiram"]. He had sores all over his body. The fruit that occasionally fell on his body gave him excruciating pain. In agony he cried out a curse : "Let this tree bear no fruit any longer". During the festival, the dancing Namboothiri priests place the idols of various gods in a small "Mandapam" under the tree. People pay obeisance to the deities here.

== Performance ==
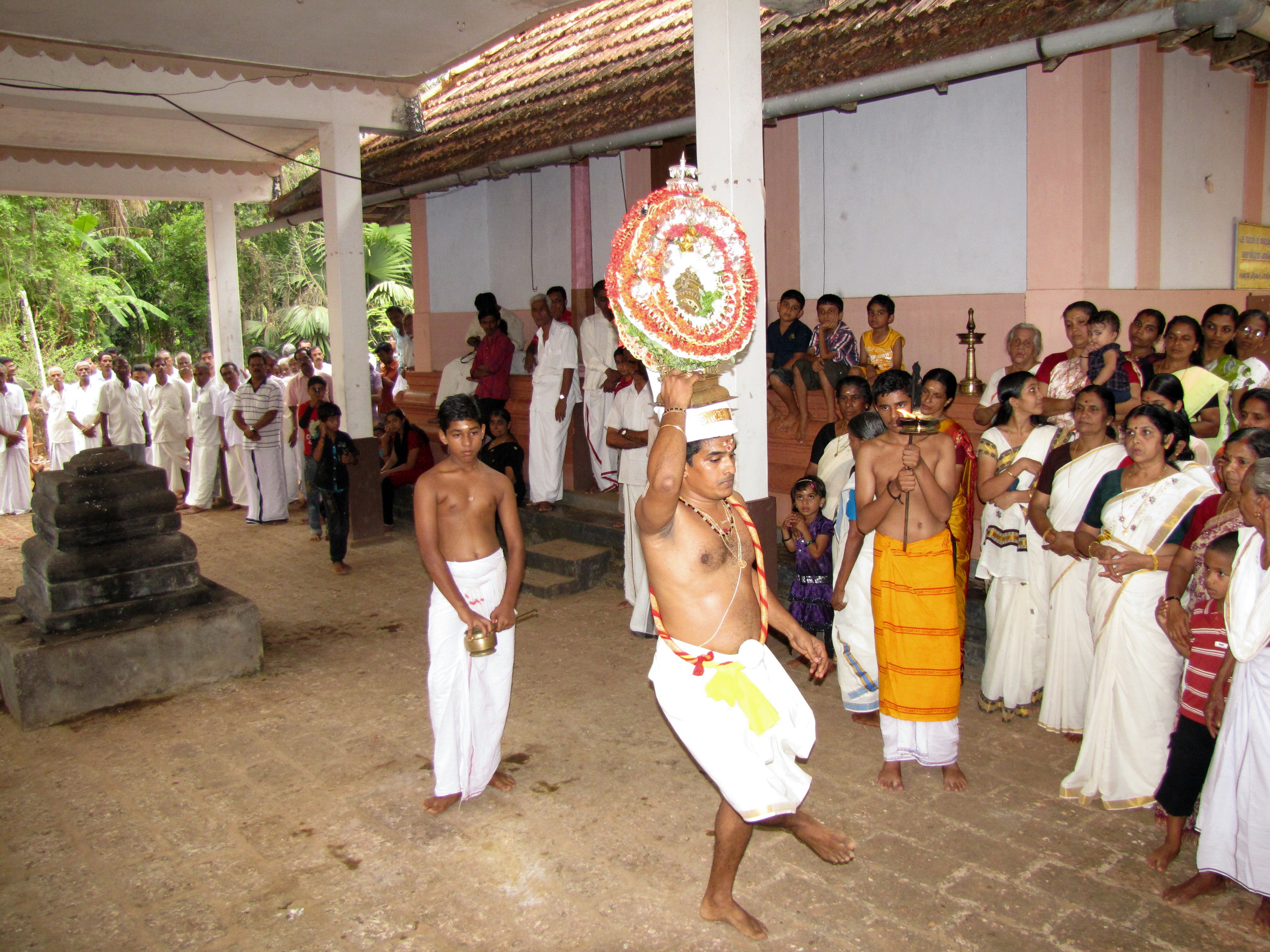
Thidambu Nritham performed at Sree Someswari Temple, Koovery

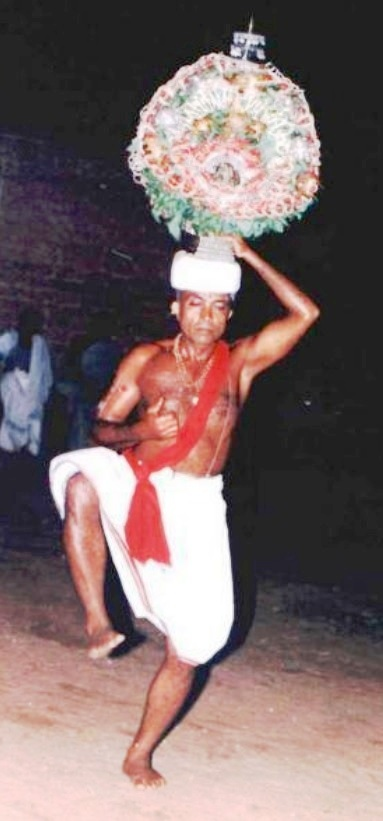
Thidambu Nritham

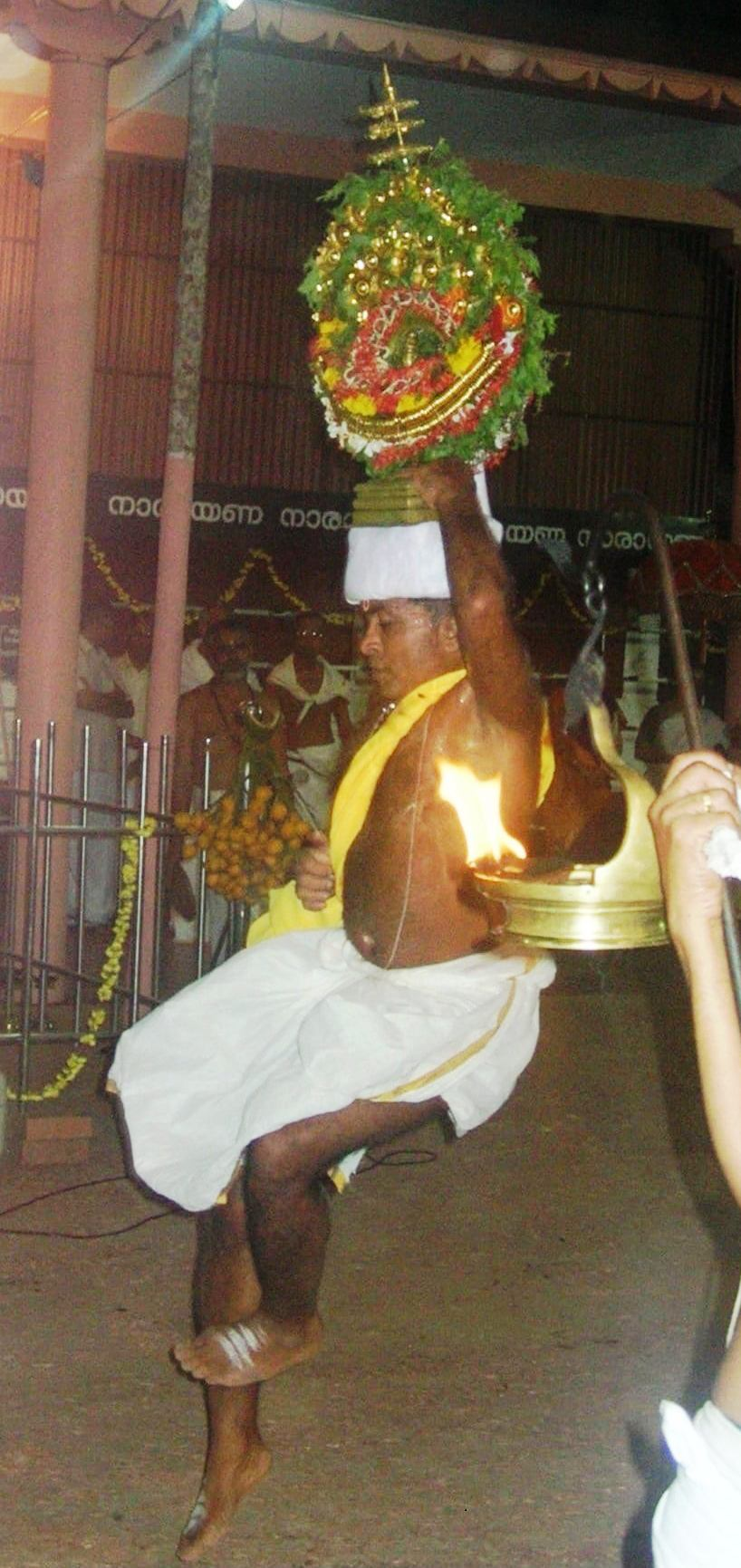
Thidambu Nritham

Thidambu Nritham begins with "Kotti Urayikkal", drumming in different rhythm, which would persuade the performer and the viewer to an equal extent. The performer will dance with the rhythm holding the "Thidambu" on his head.

This unique ritual art form has undergone changes over the period of time. Even though the basic concepts of Thidamabu Nritham have not changed, slight change happened in its Thaalam, which has added more novelty and variety to this art. There is no scope for emotional expressions in this art.

An exception is famous "Kootippiriyal" (parting of lord Krishna and Balarama at Trichambaram./ Krishna and Balarama play about wildly until the former runs after the milkman carrying milk, and the latter returns to his dwelling some distance away.

There is a legend woven round the Thitambu Nritham of Thrichambaram. There was an ardent devotee of lord Krishna - a Namboothiri. He visited the temple everyday, seeking Krishna's blessings. Time flew. He grew old, so old that he could not walk up to the temple half a kilometer away. Inwardly crushed at his physical incapacity, he prayed : "Krishna, my dear, I cannot come to you; forgive me". Legend has it that, that night, lord Krishna ran up to him with his brother Balarama and danced along what is called "Pookkottu Nada" just in front of the Namboothiri's house.

The festival at Trichambaram which goes on from 22nd Kumbham to 6th Meenam (middle March) is in celebration of that event. During the festival, the "Melsaanthis" of Trichambaram and Mazhoor (Balarama's temple) hold aloft the replicas of the two deities and dance to the rhythm of percussion instruments.

Famous artists

Puthumana Govindan Namboothiri from Kanhangad is one of the biggest temple dancers in country India who dedicated entire period of life to rejuvenate thidambu nritham. He developed systematic and organized thidambu nritham to a famous temple dance. Pudhumana, the all time stalwart of thidambu nritham had also made many changes in it and provided a novel definition to thidambu nritham.
