= Plappalli =

Plappalli may refer to:

- Plappally, a settlement located in the Goodrical range of Ranni forest division in the state of Kerala.
- Plappalli (caste), a Hindu Brahmin Ampalavasi caste in Kerala, India.
