= P. K. Narayanan Nambiar =

Indian musician (1927–2023)

- Born: 26 May 1927; Killikurissimangalam, Palakkad district, British Raj
- Died: 15 November 2023 (aged 96); Palakkad, Kerala, India
- Other name: Panivaada Thilakan Narayan Nambiar
- Occupations: Musician, artist, author
- Children: Dr. P.K. Jayanthi; Unnikrishnan Nambiar; Harish Nambiar; Vasanthi Narayanan
- Parent: Mani Madhava Chakiar
- Awards: Padmashri; Kerala Kalamandalam Fellowship; Kerala Sangeetha Nataka Akademi; Award Nritha Natya Puraskaram

Paanivadathilakan P. K. Narayanan Nambiar (26 May 1927 – 15 November 2023) was an Indian musician, known for his virtuosity in Mizhavu, a traditional percussion instrument and his scholarship in the art of Koodiyattom. He is considered to be one of the masters of Koodiyattom. In 2008, he was awarded Padmashri by Government of India for his services to the art.

== Biography ==
P. K. Narayanan Nambiar was born during the British Raj in Killikurissimangalam, in Palakkad, Kerala famous koodiyattom maestro Mani Madhava Chakiar and Kochampilli Kunjimalu Nangiaramma, a known Nangiarkoothu artist on 26 May 1927. He did his early schooling in gurukula system in Killikkurissimangalam under the tutelage of his father. Later, he started learning koodiyattom from his father and gurus like Kochampilli Raman Nambiar and Meledath Govindan Nambiar and mastered the art of playing mizhavu.

Nambiar's debut was at the Kottakkal Kovilakam Siva temple in Malappuram in 1948, at the age of 21. He started his career as a Kutiyattam actor in 1954 at Lakkidi Kunjan Memorial Library where he played Arjuna in Subradhananjayam, which was the first time the art of Koodiyattom was performed outside the four walls of a temple. Nambiar, was the first person outside the caste of Chakiar to perform as an actor in Koodiyattom. In 1966, he joined Kerala Kalamandalam, as the Guru of mizhavu. Known mizhavu performers such as Easwaran Unni, V.K.K. Hariharan and Edanadu Unnikrishnan Nambiar were his students in Kalamandalm.

Nambiar was married to Santha Nangiaramma, a performer in her younger days. He has two sons and two daughters, all of them are known artists. His daughter, Vasanthi Narayanan is an exponent of both Koodiyattom and Nangiarkoothu and performs as a member of the gurukulam while the second daughter, Dr. C.K. Jayanthi is a Sanskrit scholar with specialisation in koodiyattom serving at the Sanskrit University. Both the sons, Unnikrishnan Nambiar and Harish Nambiar are well-known mizhavu, koothu and pathakam artists. In fact Harish is the only non-Chakyar to perform the intricate Mantrankam.

Nambiar died on 15 November 2023, at the age of 96.

== Legacy ==
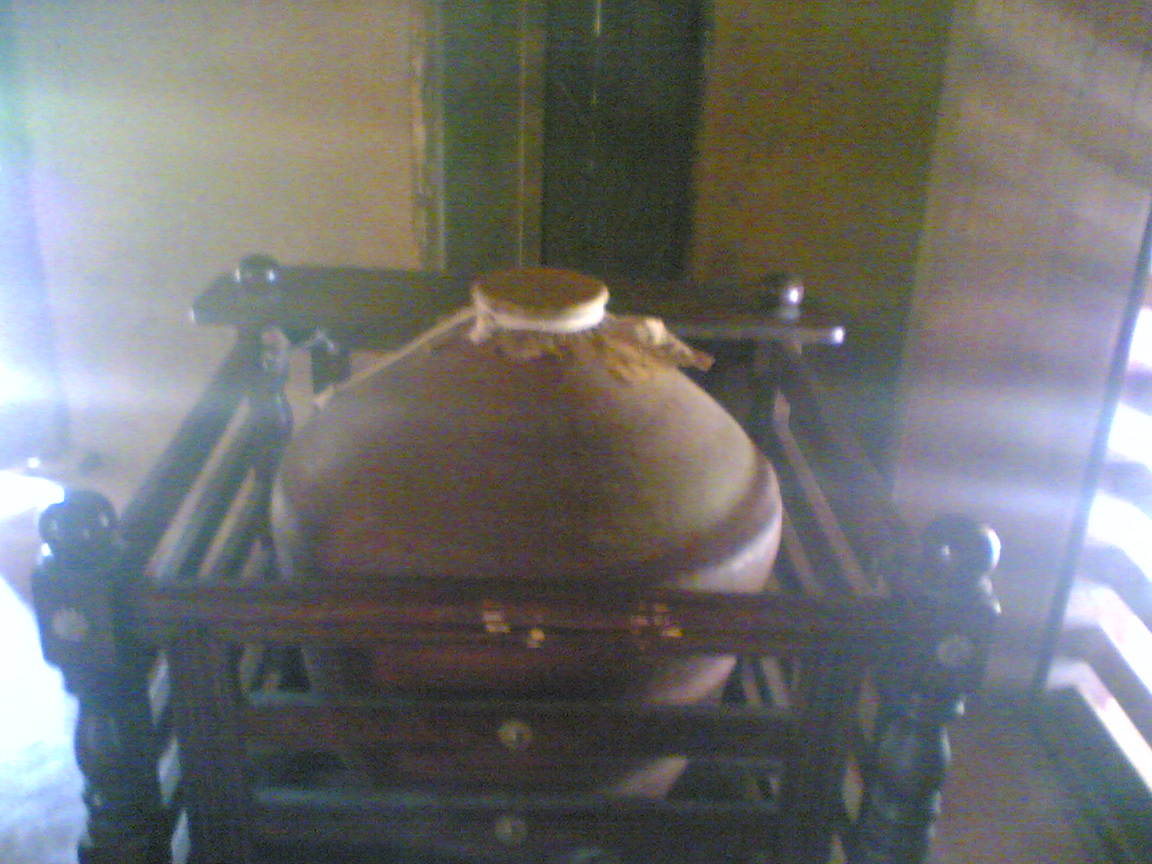
Mizhavu

Narayanan Nambiar is credited with evolving a scheme for imparting systematic training on the mizhavu during his time at kalamandalam where he served until his retirement in 1988. He developed a unique form of jugalbandi involving mizhavu and edakka, another percussion instrument called Mizhavu Thayambaka. He is also admired for his efforts and contributions in reviving Nangiar Koothu, the female aspect of Koodiyattam, which is a female solo performance.

Nambiar authored several Attaprakarams (Stage Manuals) for Koodiiyattom such as the staging of Kaliyaankam, the performance manual of which was composed over 400 years ago. He also initiated a new dance form in the play called Hallisakam. He was also noted for his contribution in the form of the reworked version of Matha Vilasom Prahasanam, a 400-year-old Koodiyattom play which was re-constructed and choreographed to give a new style of presentation.

Nambiar later ran a school of arts, Padmashri Madhava Chakyar Gurukulam which is considered a seat of learning for Koodiyattom by Lalit Kala Akademi.

== Awards ==
- Padmashri by Government of India
- Fellowship by Kalamandalam
- Kerala Sangeetha Nataka Akademi Award (1993)
- Nritha Natya Puraskaram by Kerala State Government
- Central Sangeet Natak Akademi Award

== Works ==
- Mantrankam koothu – based on the third act of Bhasa's Prathinja Yougandharayana
- Sreekrishnancharitam Nangiarkoothu – based on Subhadradhananjayam
- Taalam in Koodiyattom – considered to be the only authentic work of its kind.

Narayanan Nambiar has also contributed to the literature of Koodiyattom by way of articles including over 30 seminar papers and has also traced out 25 unknown manuscripts in Sanskrit.
