= Brahmanippattu =

Domestic devotional offering

Brahmanippattu is a type of domestic devotional offering performed usually in connection with marriages. Women of the Nambeesan caste (one of the Pushpaka Brahmin castes) called Brahmanis or Pushpinis alone are entitled to do it.

In the dance, the women stand round a decorated stool on which some symbolic representation of Bhagavathy is placed. They then sing devotional songs to the rhythm of the beating of bronze plates. These songs were sung mainly for the blessings of Goddess Kali and Durga. Gradually the songs ascend in pitch and the women dance in ecstasy. For instance, the lyrics of a Brahmanippaattu is as follows:

"Dārikane Nigrahichu, Dārikapuram
Kudiyarutikondālente Bhagavatiyo!"

Avinisseri Narayanan Nambeesan, author of several books in Malayalam, compiled and published a collection of the Brahmanippattu songs under the title Brahmanippattukal in the year 1969.

== See also ==
- Pushpaka Brahmin
- Nambeesan
- Ambalavasi
