= Marar (caste) =

Caste of temple musicians of Kerala, India

- Classification: Temple musicians, Musicians caste
- Religions: Hinduism
- Country: India

Marar is the name given to the caste of hereditary temple musicians of Travancore, Cochin and Malabar region in the state of Kerala, whose primary duty was to provide the traditional temple Sopanam music. They belong to the Ambalavasi caste.

== Etymology ==
The word 'Marar' comes from the Tamil word 'mar', which means 'beat' and marar meaning the one who beat instruments like chenda and idakka in temples.

Men of the Marar caste are called Mārar and ladies are called Mārasyar or Amma.

Paani, the indispensable part of high tantric rituals of temple such as ulsavabali, sreeboothabali etc. is another main hereditary temple profession of Marar. They were also known for their playing of chenda (valam thala represents deva vadyam (usually play inside the nalambalam) and edam thala represents asura vadyam) and idakka (deva vadyam) in temples Sopanadwani is the monthly publication of Akhila Kerala Marar Kshema Sabha.

== Social status ==
Marar of Kerala maintained a high ritual life akin to Brahmins and other Ambalavasi castes. The social status of Ambalavasi and Marar varies with region.

In North Kerala, they were popularly known as antharala jathikal, with a ritual rank lying between Nairs and Brahmins. They formed Akhila Kerala Marar Maha Sabha for the welfare of Marars.

In South Kerala, Marar and Paathamangalakkar, along with other temple-related Ambalavasi castes, were considered as Auxiliary Nair subcaste. Despite being Ambalavasi, they were also known as Nair-Marar, and were part of Akhila Kerala Marar Maha Sabha along with the Nair Service Society.

== Notable people ==
- Peruvanam Kuttan Marar, artist.
- K. Karunakaran, ex-chief minister.
- K. Muraleedharan, former minister and MP
- G. Sankara Kurup, writer
- Kuttikrishna Marar, writer.
- Kizhakkoottu Aniyan Marar, artist.
- Annamanada Parameswara Marar, artist.
- K. G. Marar, politician
- Shadkala Govinda Marar, musician.
- Mattanoor Sankarankutty Marar,Percussionist.
