= Kunchan Nambiar =

Malayalam poet (1705–1770)

Kunjan Nambiar
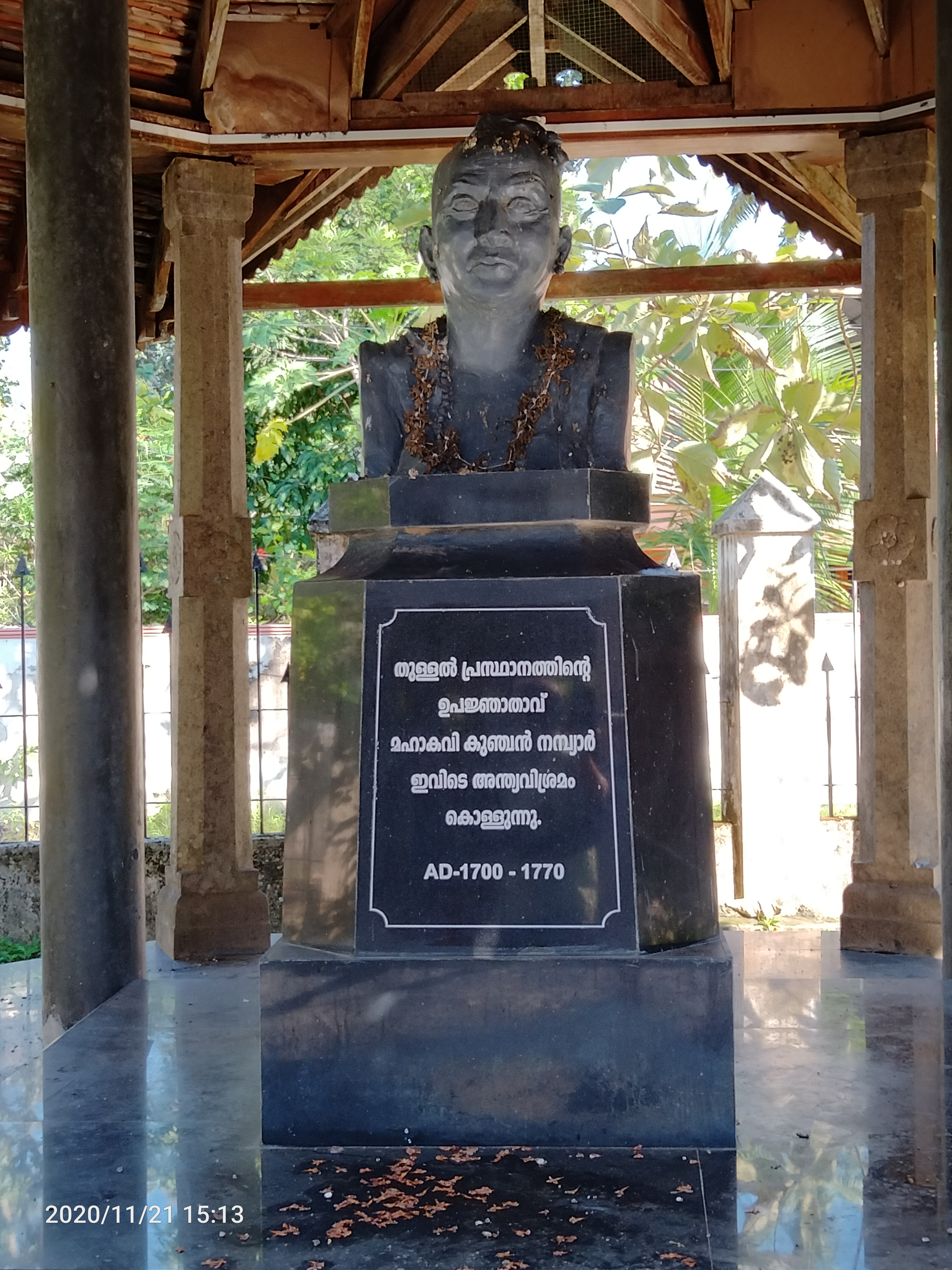
- Kunchan Nambiar statue in Ambalappuzha
- Born: 5 May 1705; Palakkad, Kerala, India
- Died: 1770; Ambalappuzha, Kerala, India
- Occupation: Poet

Kunchan Nambiar was a prominent Malayalam poet of the 18th century (1705-1770). Apart from being a prolific poet, Nambiar is also famous as the originator of the dance art form of Thullall, most of his works were written for use in Thullal performances. Social criticism wrapped in humour is the hallmark of his works. Nambiar is one of the foremost comedians in Malayalam, and he belongs to the Ambalavasi community.

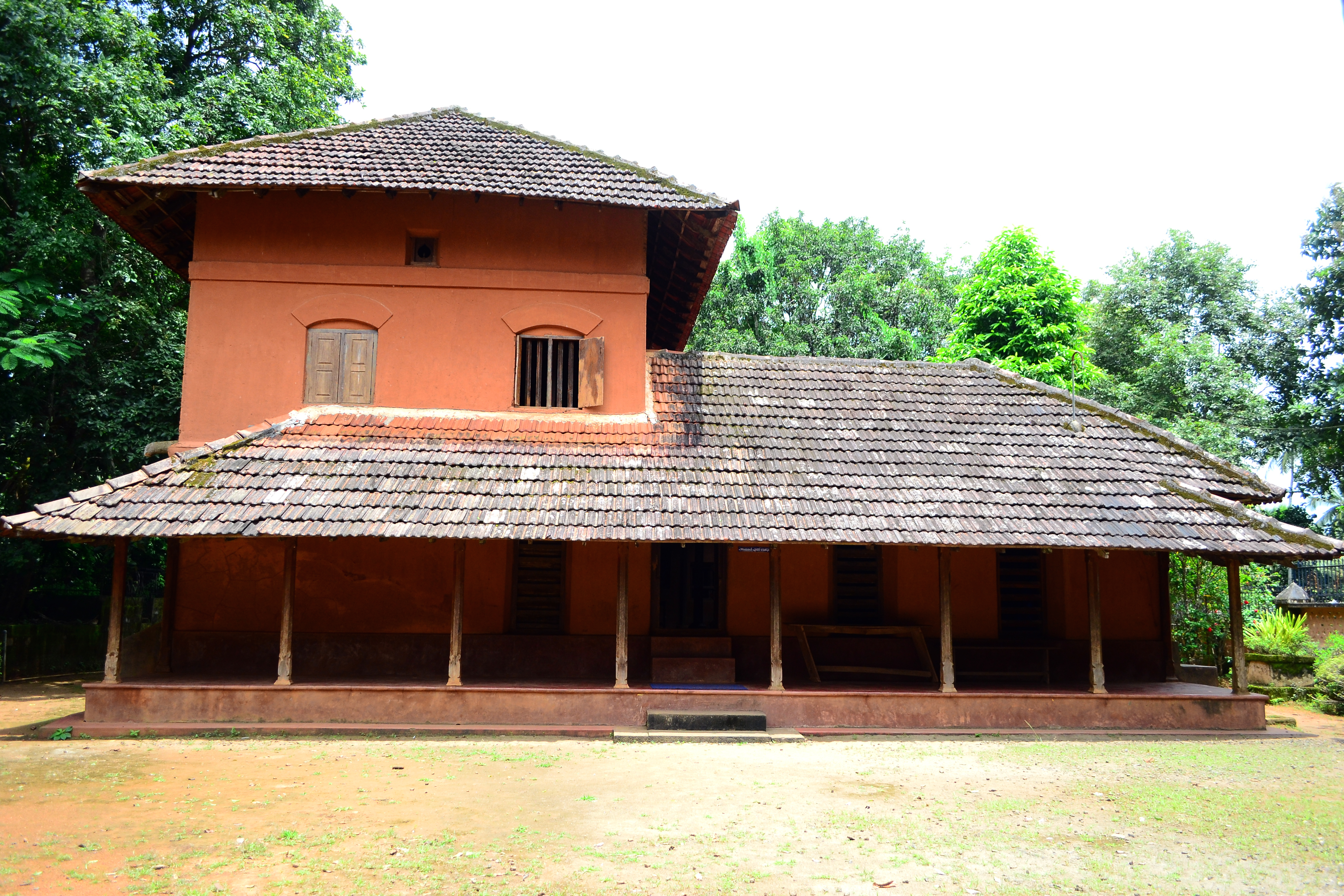
Kalakkathu Veedu

Nambiar was born at Kalakkathu Veedu at Killikkurussimangalam in Palakkad district of the south Indian state of Kerala;. He spent his early childhood at Killikkurussimangalam, his boyhood at Kudamaloor and youth at Ambalappuzha, and learnt Kalaripayattu and Sanskrit from such masters as Mathoor Panickar, Dronaballi Naicker and Nannikod Unni Ravi Kurup (Nanthikattu Balaravi kurupp) at Kandankary, before moving to the court of Marthanda Varma of Travancore in 1748; later, he served at the court of his successor Dharma Raja. By the time he reached the royal court, he had already established himself as a poet. (Note: Ulloor S. Parameswara Iyer propounded a theory that Kunchan Nambiar and Sanskrit poet, Rama Pānivāda, were the same person ("Pānivāda" means "Nambiar" in Sanskrit), but the argument has not been popularly accepted.) The later part of his life, it is believed that Nambiar returned to Ambalapuzha where he died in 1770, at the age of 65, reportedly due to rabies.

== Career ==
Many of Nambiar's verses have transformed into proverbs in Malayalam. 1. ചെറുപ്പ കാലങ്ങളിലുള്ള SHIലം മറക്കുമോ മാനുഷനുള്ള കാലം (cheruppa kālangalil ulla sheelam marakkumo maanushanulla kālam)

Translation: How can a man forget habits that he acquired at his young age?
Closest English equivalent: Old habits die hard

2. ദീപസ്തംഭം മഹാശ്ചര്യം, നമുക്കും കിട്ടണം പണം (dīpastaṃM bhaṃ mahāścaryaṃ namukkuṃ kiṭṭaṇaṃ paṇaṃM)

Translation: Your Deepa-Stambham (A multi-layered oil lamp) is magnificent, and we too want our share of money.
Closest English equivalent: When it is a question of money, everyone is of the same religion.

3. മുല്ലപ്പൂമ്പൊടി ഏറ്റു കിടക്കും കല്ലിനും ഉണ്ടാം ഒരു സൗരഭ്യം (mullappūmpoṭi ēṯṯu kiṭakkuṃ kallinuṃ uṇṭāṃ oru saurabhyaṃ)

Translation: The stone where the pollen of the jasmine flower falls acquires its fragrance.

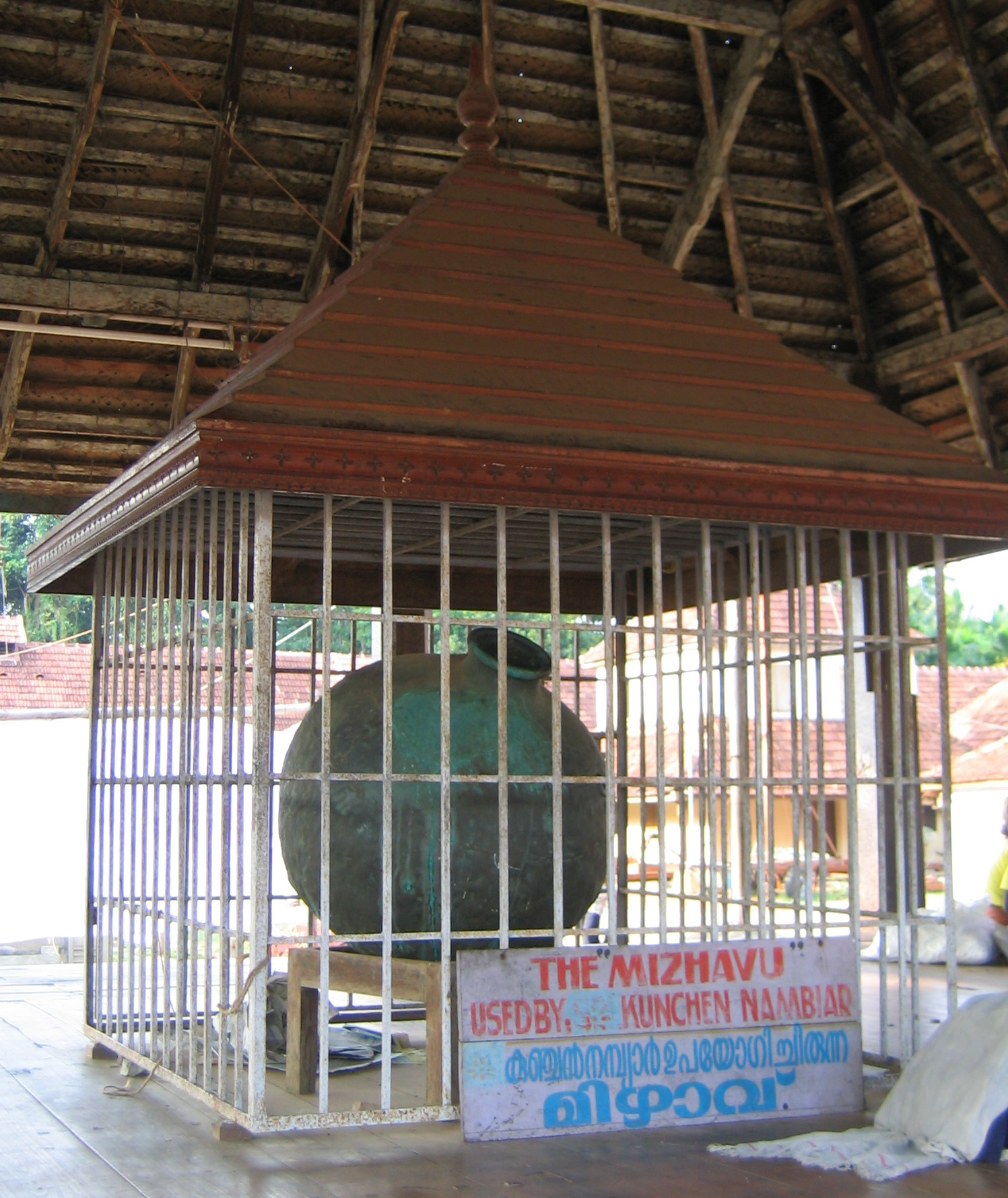
Mizhavu used by Kunchan Nambiar at Ambalappuzha Sri Krishna temple

Kunchan Nambiar is considered by many as the master of Malayalam satirist poetry and is credited with the popularisation of a performing art known as Ottan Thullal. The word, thullal, means 'dance/jumping', but under this name Nambiar developed a new style of verse narration, interspersed with occasional background music and dance-like swaying movements. Popular belief is that Nambiar devised this art form for avenging the ridicule he had to suffer from a Chakyar Koothu performer who chastised Nambiar when he dozed off while accompanying the koothu performance on Mizhavu. He used pure Malayalam as opposed to the stylised and Sanskritized Malayalam language of Chakyar Koothu, and adopted many elements from Padayani and Kolam Tullal as well as some of the other local folk arts. There are three kinds of Tullal distinguished on the basis of the performer's costume and the style of rendering, viz., Ottan, Seethankan and Parayan. Dravidian metres are used throughout although there is a quatrain in a Sanskrit metre. Kunchan Nambiar is known to have written 64 thullal stories. He also developed new metres (for example; Vaytari metres) based on the vocal notation for various talas. The language is predominantly Malayalam with a large admixture of colloquial and dialectal forms.

== Honours ==
The Government of Kerala observes Nambiar's birthday, 5 May, as Kunchan Day. A society, Kunjan Nambiar Memorial Society, has been established by the government overseas the management of various memorials which include Kunchan Nambiar Smarakam, Nambiar's house in Killikkurussimangalam, Kunchan Memorial Library, Kunchan Memorial Arts Society, and Kunchan Memorial Society. Kunchan Smarakam Fort is a fort built by the state government in honour of the poet and the monument houses an institution which promotes teaching of satirist art forms.

Kunchan Nambiar's body of work is composed of at least 21 Otttan, 11 Seethankan and 9 Parayan compositions. The most important of Nambiar's Thullals are: Syamanthakam, Ghoshayathra, Kiratham, Santhanagopalam, Patracharitham, Karthaveeryarjunavijayam, Bakavadham, Kalyana Saugandhikam, Hariniswayamvaram, Thripuradahanam and Sabha Pravesham. Nambiar was critical of the social evils he saw around him and incorporated his satirical views in his compositions even when the main story is from the Hindu Puranas; he would introduce digressions and use such occasions to comment on society.

== Extracts from Kunchan Nambiar's poems/writings ==
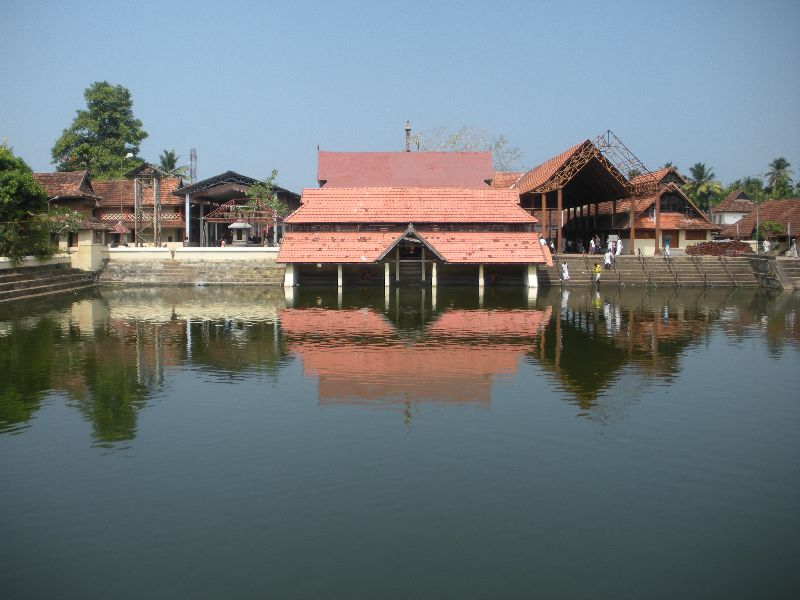
Ambalappuzha Sri Krishna Temple, the place where Nambiar is believed to have performed Ottan Thullal for the first time.

- Ravana is speaking to Narada about his own prowess (Kartavirya Arjuna Vijayam):

The kingdom of the Gandhara ruler
Has turned into a mere desert.
The land of the Sinhala King
Is now filled with lions and leopards.
The lord of the Chera people
Feeds himself on cheap vegetables.
The Chola King has nothing to eat
Except the maize of low quality
The kings of the Kuru house
Have nothing but jackfruit seeds.
The lord of the land of Kashmir
Is busy eating cucumbers.
The ruler of the Champeya land
Eats only tubers and broken rice.
The Konkan prince is about to die
Thinking of his wives' breasts.

- Another passage from the same work:

Tributes must be paid from time to time;
Half the yield should be given to me.
The whole of pepper yield should be handed over
Coconut, arecanut, mango, jackfruit:
All the trees should be confiscated.
There will be no place in my country
For the pomp of local barons.
Double the seed crop should be given
To me by houseowner.
The Tamil Brahmins (Pattars) staying here
Should also give one fourth to me.
The Nayars who stay at home
Should take their bows and spears
And stay at the residence of Ravana
And do whatever chores are assigned.
Nayars who drink toddy
Would be beaten up, beware!

== See also ==
- Malayalam literature
- List of Malayalam-language authors
