= Nambidi =

Nambidi is a semi-Brahmin caste, which is part of the Ambalavasi community of Kerala, India. They are considered to be Malayali Brahmins and to have originated when a section of the Nambudiris was degraded. They also have the same rights and rituals of nambudiri's. The nambidi ladies are usually called Mandals / Atholammas used to wear the cheruthalis and are similar to Antharjanams (Namboothiri Ladies). The nambidi's also had great economic and Societic importance and have the same grade of Nambudiris in the Society. They have no right to do Poojas in temples. Nambidis are divided into two: the ones who wear the sacred thread and perform the Upanayanam and the ones who do not. The former are Nambudiris who were degraded to the Lower status since their ancestors had committed a heinous act by murdering a ruler of Kerala. On their return the other Nambudiris welcomed them but they refused to seat themselves with the other Brahmins owing to the sin they committed and instead sat on the steps of the hall. They came to be known as Nom Padimels or those on the steps and this term was later corrupted into Nambidi. The latter are Nairs who were assigned the Nambidi title. Namboodiris will Join with nambidi's in all their functions and rituals.

== See also ==
- Ambalavasi
- Pushpaka Brahmin
- Nambiar (Ambalavasi caste)
