= Kuttu =

Kuttu may refer to:

- Kuttu flour, a buckwheat or grass seed flour
- Chakyar koothu, a south Indian performance art
- Kuttu, a western islet in Chuuk State, Micronesia
