= Pisharody =

Hindu community from Kerala, India

Pisharody is a Hindu semi-Brahmin caste which is part of the Ambalavasi community..

== Notable people ==
- Achyuta Pisharati
- Anirudh Pisharody, Indian-American actor and film producer
- Attoor Krishna Pisharody
- Cherukad Govinda Pisharody
- K. P. Narayana Pisharody
- Pisharoth Rama Pisharoty
- Kalamandalam Vasu Pisharody
- N. N. Pisharody
- Ramesh Pisharody

== See also ==
- Ambalavasi
