= Plappalli (caste) =

Plappalli or Plappally is a Hindu Caste in Kerala. This is the illom name and sometimes surname Ampalavasi castes in Kerala. This caste is peculiar to Travancore and classified under Ampalavasis. The males are invested with Sacred Thread between the year 8 and 16. Formerly the Ilayathus officiated as their priests, but now the service is performed by Nampoothiris or Pottis.

== See also ==
- Ampalavasi
- Pushpaka Brahmin
