= Padamangalam Nair =

Regions with significant populations
- Travancore

Languages
- Malayalam

Religion
- Hinduism

Padamangalam Nair, or Padamangalakkar, is an Ambalavasi or temple servant caste found mostly in southern Kerala, India. They were considered as auxiliary sub-caste of Nair community in southern Kerala.

In the caste hierarchy, they were placed below the aristocratic Illam and Swaroopathil Nair subcastes in southern Kerala, and in northern Kerala, they were absorbed into the wider Ambalavasi caste.
