= Invis =

Indian media company

Invis Multimedia
- Type: Private
- Industry: Multimedia entertainment
- Genre: Anime
- Founded: 1995
- Headquarters: Kerala, India
- Key people: N.R.S. Babu (Chairman); M.R. Hari (Managing Director); M.R. Ajith (Executive Director); Adv.N.S. Lal (Director)
- Services: IT consultant
- Number of employees: 60
- Website: invismultimedia.com

Invis Multimedia, formerly India Vision International, an ICT consultant and solution provider and also the first Apple computer based video production studio of India, was set up in 1995. They started commercial production in March 1996.

== History ==
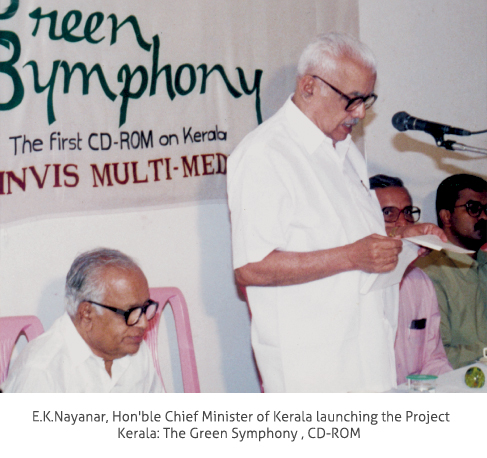
E. K. Nayanar Chief Minister of Kerala launching the project Kerala: The Green Symphony in 1996

In 1996 November, E. K. Nayanar, Chief Minister of Kerala, launched the CD-ROM project of Invis Multimedia. The history of digital media in Kerala starts with the launching of the project Kerala: The Green Symphony in November 1996. The CD- ROM, Kerala: The Green Symphony was the first cross platform (Windows/Macintosh) CD-ROM developed in India. The final product was released on 18 June 1998. Subsequently, the Department of Tourism, Government of Kerala agreed to sponsor the title Kerala: The Green Symphony and it was released as a multimedia title, produced in association with Kerala Tourism. The CD-ROM was later translated into Hindi, German, French and Japanese languages.

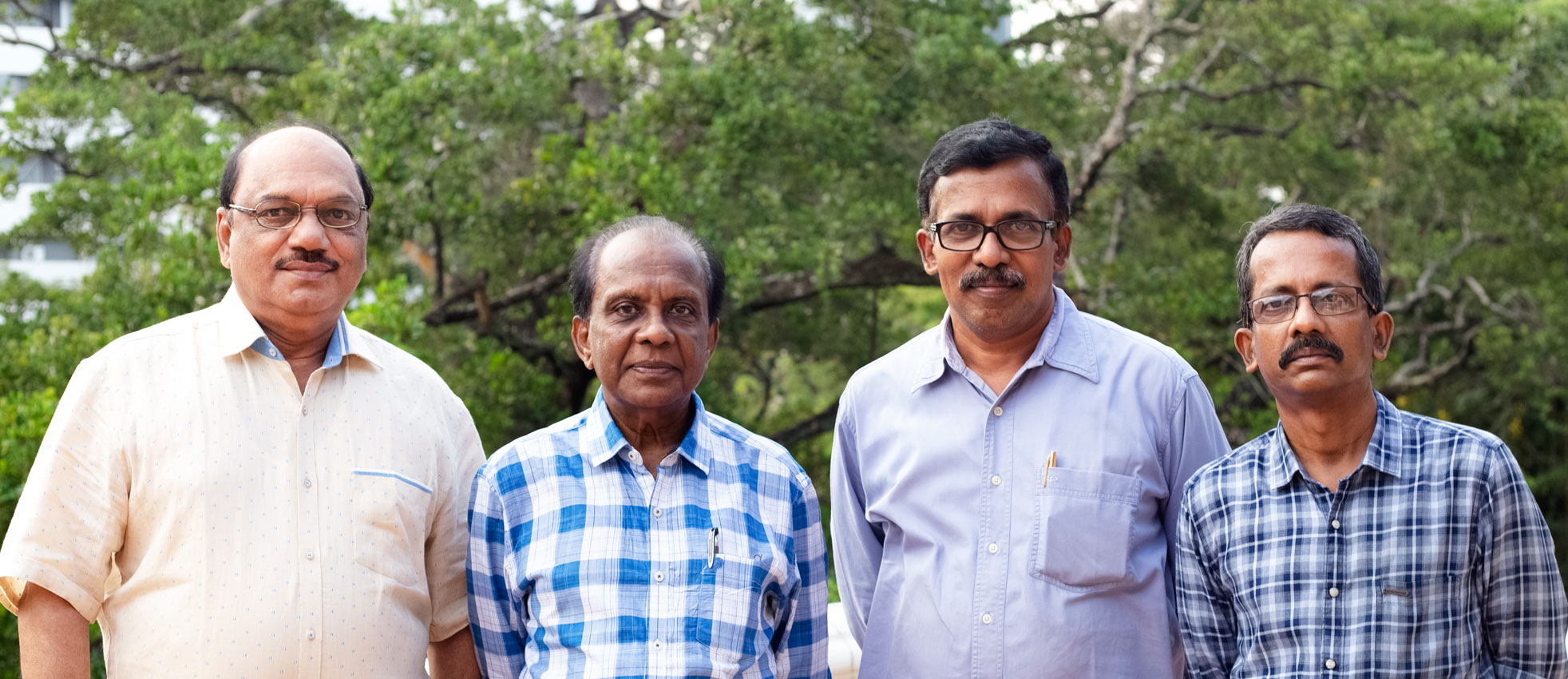
Invis-Directors N.S. Lal, N R S Babu, M.R.Hari, M R Ajith

In 1998, Invis Multimedia was appointed as the ICT Solution Provider of Kerala Tourism. They developed the portal www.keralatourism.org for the Department of Tourism, Government of Kerala.

In 2000, Invis Multimedia envisaged a plan to geotag all the major institutions and destinations of Kerala on a map to be developed with geographical information system. This was four years before the birth of Google Earth. The project had to be aborted due to delays in getting clearance for using satellite images and, with the introduction of Google Earth, all the services envisaged in the proposed plan became freely available. However, Invis developed a GIS map for Kerala Tourism in 2003, proving that they were years ahead of their time.

In 2001, Invis launched a CD- ROM on Ayurveda, the ancient health science of India. The CD was launched by Atal Bihari Vajpayee, the Prime Minister of India. It was translated into French and German languages. The title won a number of prestigious national and international awards.

In 2002, Invis Multimedia became a member of UNESCO’s Global Alliance for Cultural Diversity. In 2003, it started publishing music CD titles. In the same year, Invis brought out a VCD on Panchakarma: Ayurveda’s Mantra for Rejuvenation. This was brought out in 9 languages. Development and publication of a series of coffee table books also started in this year, the first of the set being Panchakarma: Ayurveda’s Mantra for Rejuvenation. Another book on Kerala was released after a few years.

Invis Multimedia started recording classical dance and theatre performances by masters for sharing and archiving the works of masters in 2003. A DVD series with English subtitles on the classical art forms of Kerala titled Know Your Heritage was also released. In 2004 Invis introduced another DVD series on classical artforms of India. The package titled Symphony Celestial with 12 DVDs contained ten dance or theatre forms of India. Soon after, Invis Multimedia introduced a greetings CD titled Spirit of Christmas.

Invis started taking up mobile site development and mobile content development in 2006. Subsequently, they started developing mobile applications.

Rhapsodies from God's Own Country, a pack of eight DVDs on Kerala, was brought out in 2007. This series got National Award for the Best Film from the Ministry of Tourism. Invis brought out several DVDs and music CD titles there after. Even though Invis envisaged the idea of a video portal on India and registered the domain Indiavideo.org. in 2004, the portal became operational only in 2007.

Invis introduced the concept of online video greetings in September 2007 through its website Keralavideos.com. This was the first instance of using online video clips to convey festival greetings. Soon after this site was merged with Indiavideo.org. In November 2007, Invis Multimedia launched the website Indiavideo.org, an online video encyclopedia of India in association with UNESCO New Delhi office. Another project implemented in association with UNESCO New Delhi office was a twin volume DVD on the traditional magic of India, titled Enchanting Illusions.

In 2009, Invis Multimedia started a partnership with YouTube to open a brand channel. The channel currently contains nearly 10,000 video clips from India, and gets more than 60,000 video views per day. The channel has 86,000 subscribers.

100 years of Bollywood was a video series produced by Invis Multimedia on the eve of 100 years of Indian cinema. This series presented many early films and film personalities.

In 2013, Invis brought out four major e-books in association with Kerala Tourism.

From 2013 to 2015, Invis Multimedia organized large campaigns for pushing traffic to the websites of its clients like Kerala Tourism and Grand Kerala Shopping Festival. Invis Multimedia supported an initiative of Kerala Tourism to do live webcasts of major festivals of Kerala happening in remote villages and major cultural festivals. Three large events were organized under this program: the HD quality, multiple days live webcasts of Arattupuzha Pooram, Theyyam festival and Nishagandhi Dance and Music Festival.

In 2014, Invis brought out its first Blu-ray. This disc titled Ayurveda and Yoga: The veda of health was made for Kerala Tourism.

Invis has been running branded video channels on YouTube since 2007. In 2016, Invis started various online educational channels on YouTube.

Invis Multimedia has been working as the ICT solution provider of Kerala tourism since 1998, winning seven successive bids. Recently, Department of Cultural Affairs, Government of Kerala has selected Invis Multimedia as its ICT solution provider. In 2016, Invis started offering BLE (Bluetooth Low Energy Solutions) for making museums barrier free and sharing digital content with visitors. In 2017, Invis started offering virtual travel guides for travellers visiting Kerala.

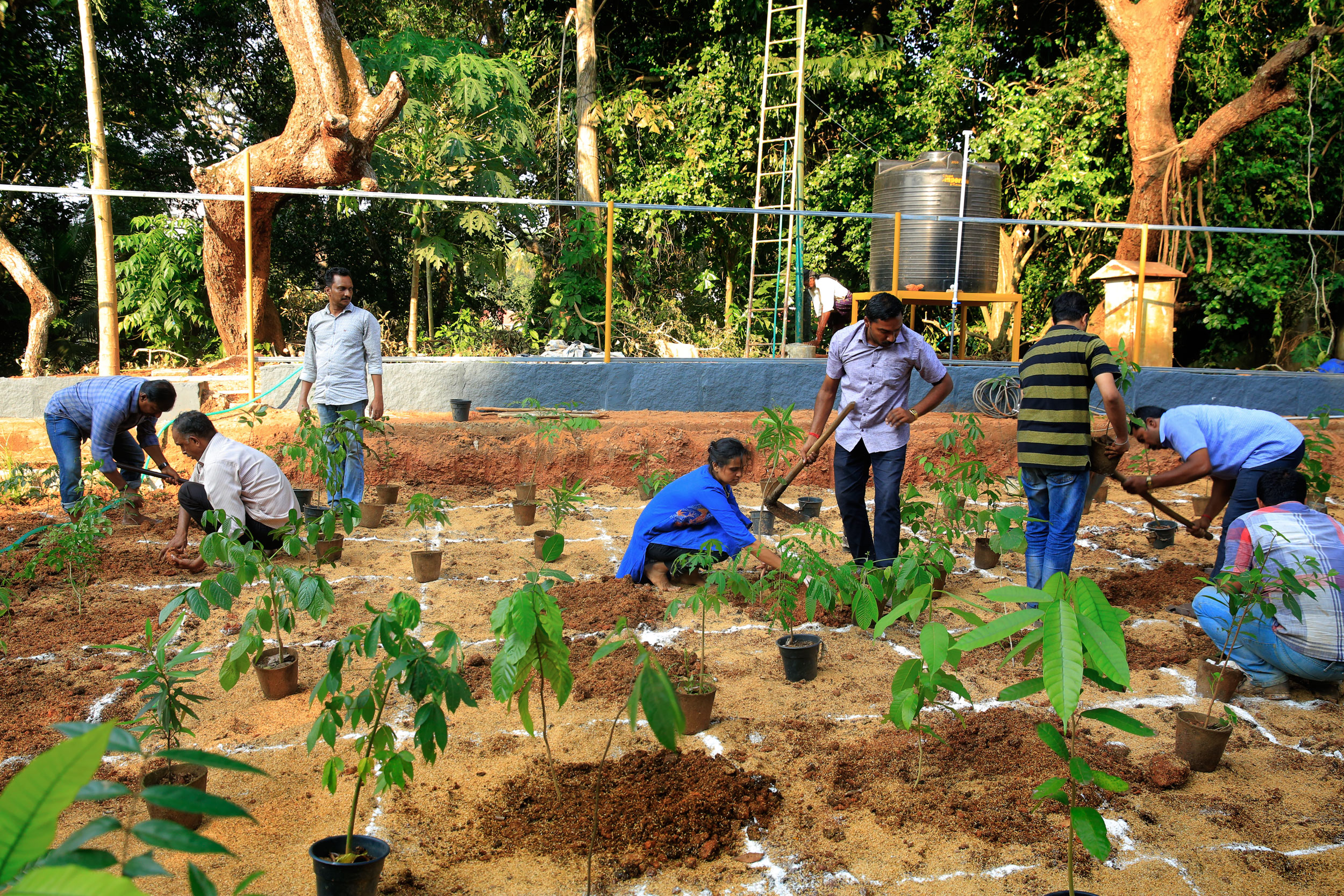
Afforestation at Kanakakunnu

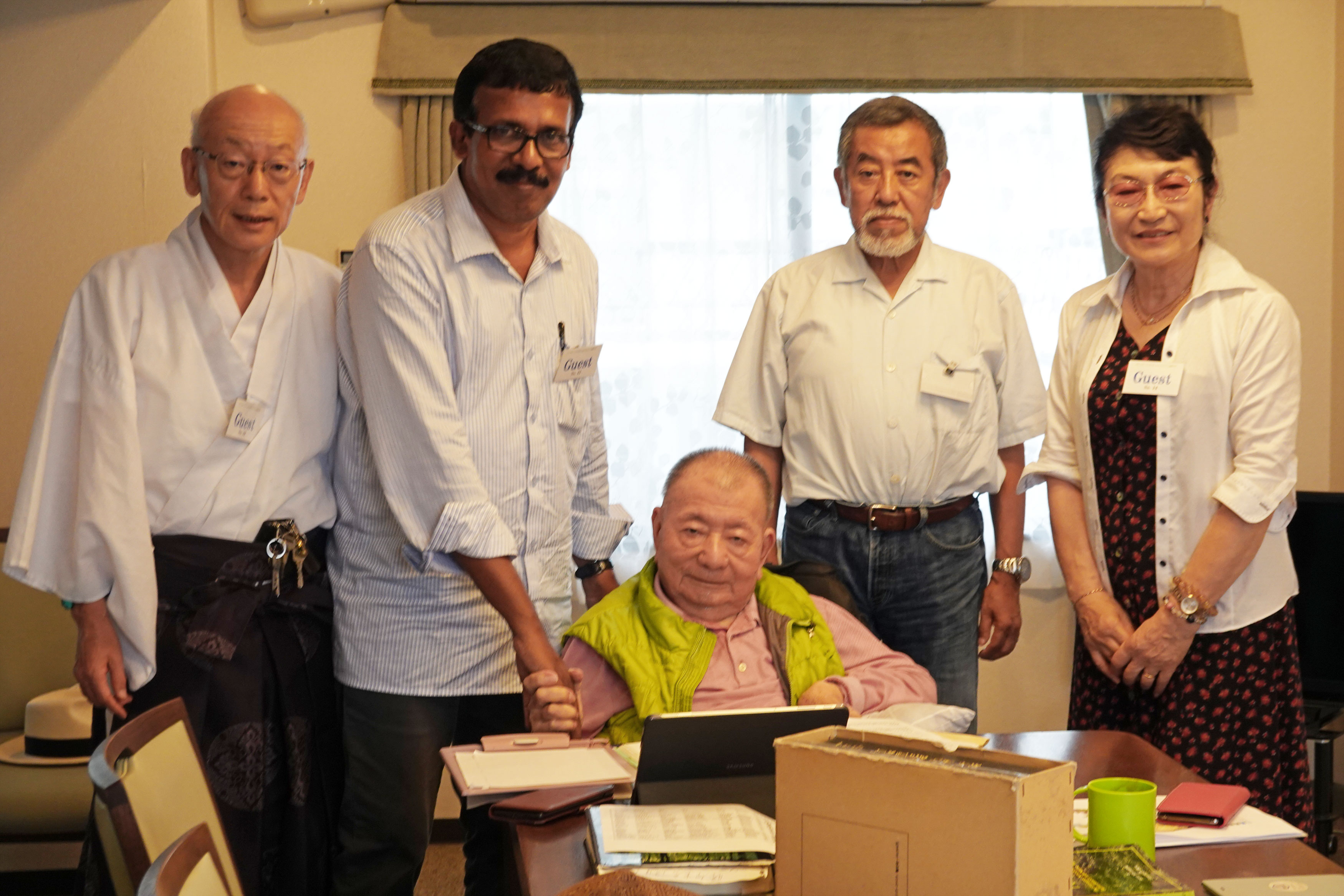
Prof. Akira Miyawaki, Mr Kiyokazu Kasayama, M R Hari, Prof Kouto Nakamura, Prof Kazue Fujiwara

== CSR ==
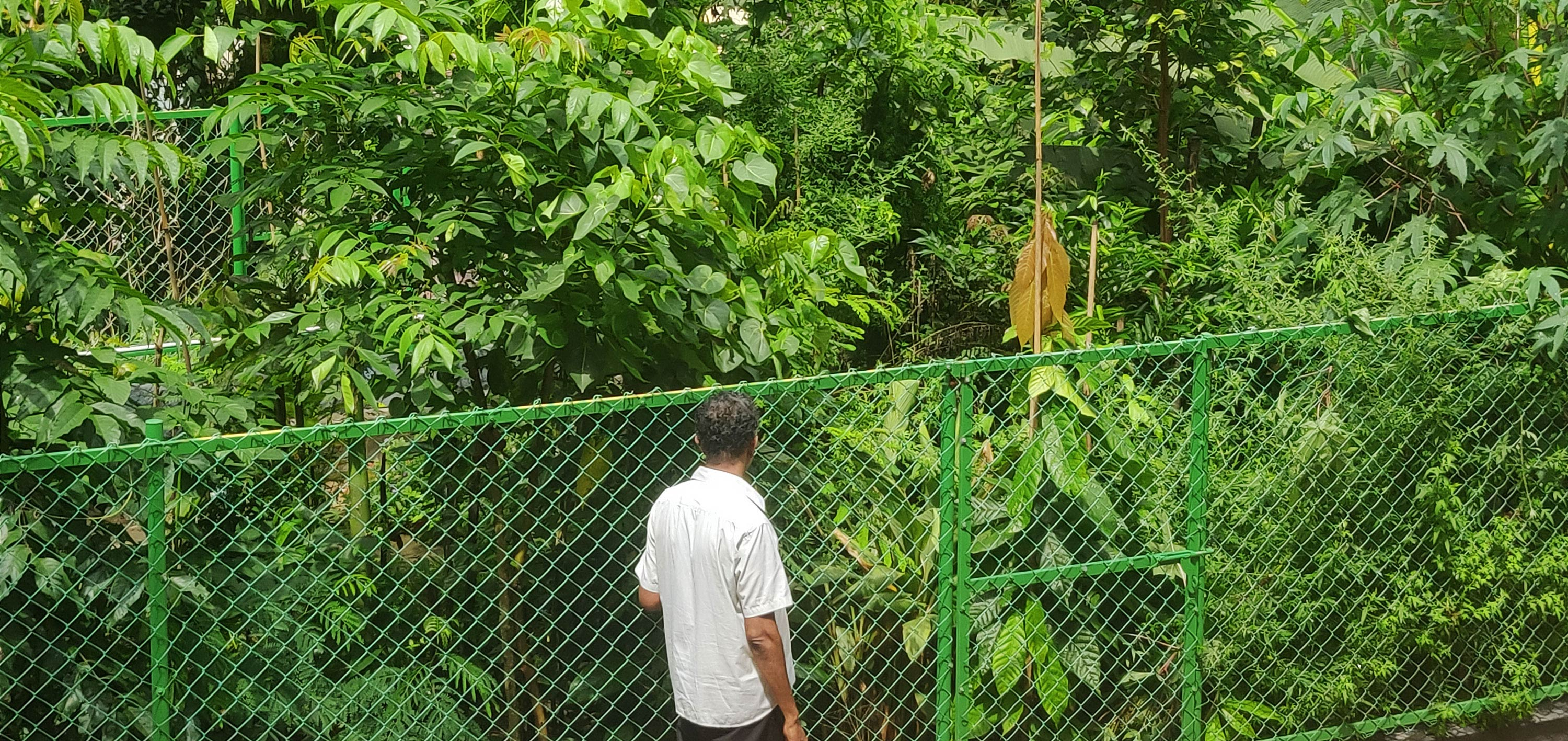
Miyawaki forest – 9 months after planting

In 2016, Hari zeroed in on the method of afforestation developed by Prof. Akira Miyawaki. The first Miyawaki model urban forest in Kerala was created as an Invis initiative at Puliyarakonam, Thiruvananthapuram on 31 January 2018. Subsequently, the first Miyawaki forest in a public place in Kerala was created at Kanakakunnu under the auspices of the Department of Tourism, Government of Kerala, on 2 January 2019. This was a joint effort of M/s Nature's Green Guardian Foundation, Invis Multimedia Pvt. Ltd and Culture Shoppe Pvt. Ltd.

The success of the Miyawaki model of afforestation has inspired the Invis group to use Prof. Miyawaki's model widely in the fight against climate change. More than 15 micro forests have been created so far in 2019 alone. M/s Culture Shoppe, the sister concern of Invis Multimedia, is now actively engaged in setting up nurseries of forest plants in different parts of the state to popularize and adopt Prof. Miyawaki's model on a massive scale.
