= Annamanada Parameswara Marar =

Indian percussionist

Annamanada Parameswaran Marar
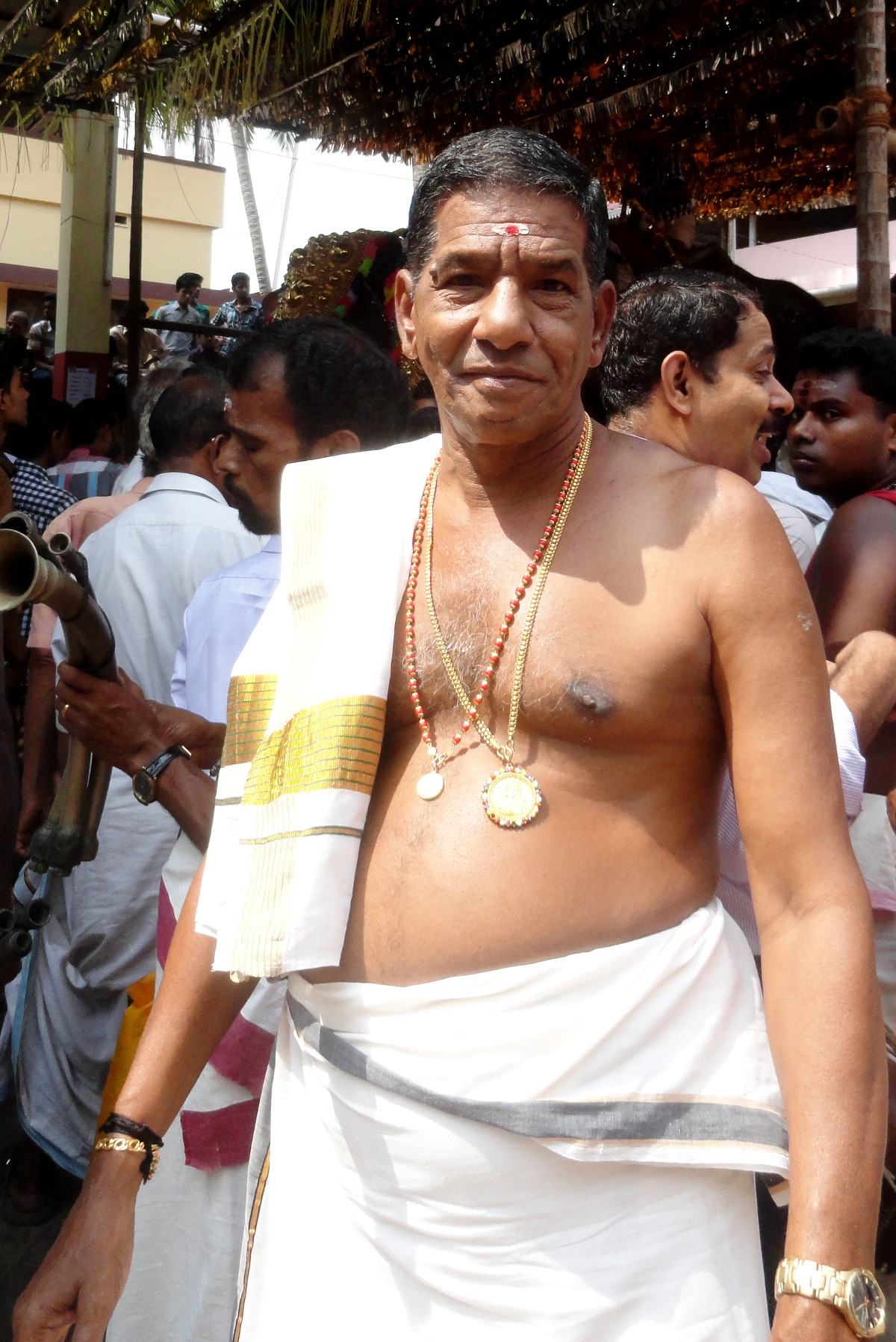
- Parameswara Marar in 2013
- Born: 5 June 1952; Annamanada, Thrissur district, Kerala, India
- Died: 12 June 2019; Kochi, Kerala, India
- Occupation: Percussionist
- Years active: 1964–2019
- Awards: Kerala Sangeetha Nataka Akademi Fellowship

Annamanada Parameshwara Marar (5 June 1952 – 12 June 2019) was an Indian percussionist from Kerala, widely considered to be a maestro in the Timila and Panchavadyam. During his peak performing years, which lasted around forty years, Marar was a frequent performer at the renowned Thrissur Pooram and also anchored about 150 panchavadyam performances annually. He is a recipient of many awards including the Kerala Sangeetha Nataka Academy Award.

== Biography ==
Parameshwara Marar was born on 5 June 1952 in Thrissur district, Kerala to the Mararath family. He was a student in the first batch of the Kerala Kalamandalam for Thimila training, having joined there in 1964. He made his debut in panchavadyam under the guidance of prominent percussionist s such as Annamanada Senior Parameshwara Marar, Kuzhur Narayanamarar and, Chalakudy Nambeesan and Kolamangalamath Rayanannayar. After making his debut, he underwent two years of additional training under the Pallavoor brothers. After completing his training, Parameswaran joined the independent Panchavadyam troupes and quickly rose to prominence as a notable percussionist. He also dedicated a time to studying under and listening to renowned percussionists like Pallavoor Appu Marar, Maniyan Marar, and Kunhikuttan Marar. The Annamanada trio, consisting of Achutha Marar, Peethambara Marar, and Parameswara Marar (Sr.), held a prominent place in the history of Panchavadyam, the traditional percussion ensembles found in temples, throughout the latter part of the 20th century. For his contributions to Panchavadyam, Parameswaran received the highest accolade from the State Government, the Pallavoor Appu Marar Puraskaram, the Kerala Sangeetha Nataka Academy Fellowship, and the Kerala Kalamandalam Award. Parameshwara Marar was suffering from diabetes for a long time. Just five weeks prior to his passing, he anchored a ninety-minute panchavadyam, despite his severe diabetes preventing his injured fingers from moving freely. In the first week of June 2019, he was admitted to Amrita Hospital in Kochi due to pneumonia and died there on 12 June.
