= Mizhavu =

Type of Percussion instrument

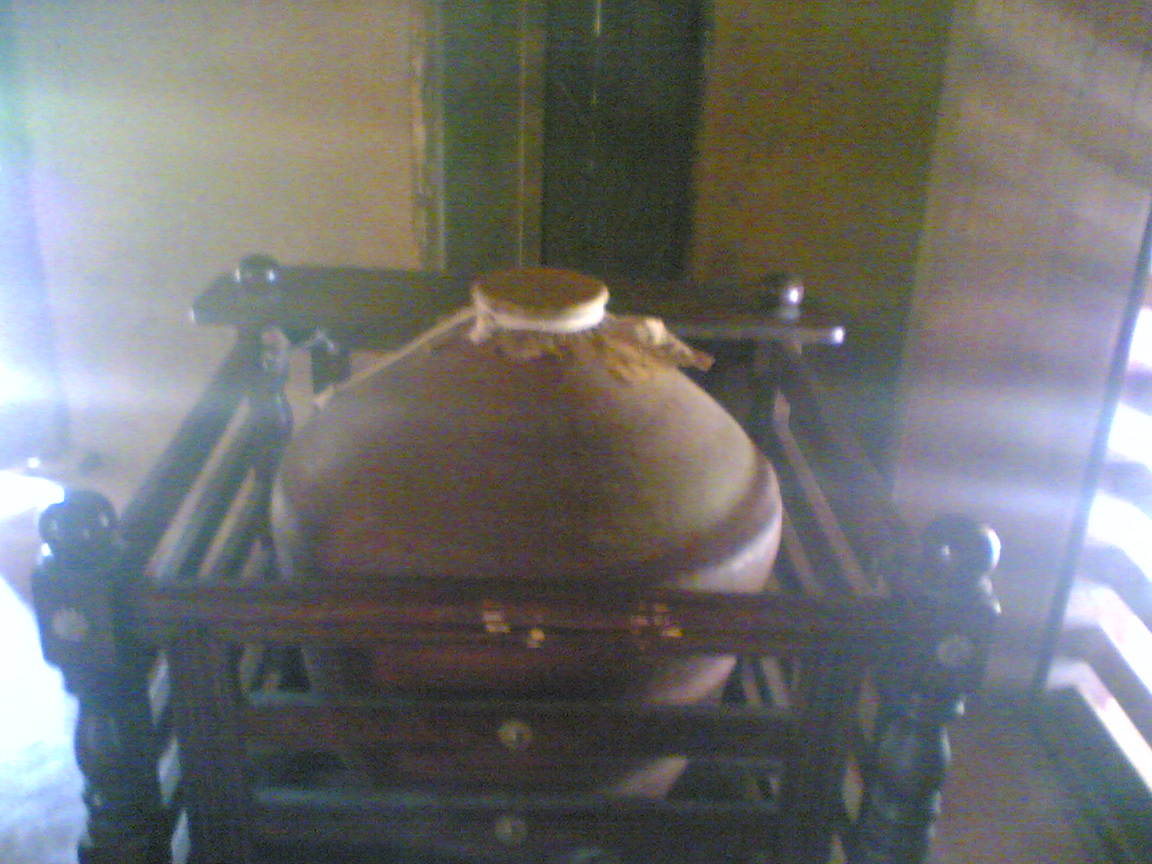
Mizhavu kept in Mizhavana (wooden box made especially to keep the mizhavu).

A mizhav or mizhavu (Malayalam: മിഴാവ്) is a big copper drum played as an accompanying percussion instrument in the Koodiyattam and Koothu, the performing arts of Kerala, which include nangiar koothu, chakyar koothu, and mizhavu thayambaka. It is played by the Ambalavasi Nambiar community. When in 1965 the Kerala Kalamandalam began teaching Koodiyattam, the caste barrier on playing the instrument was broken.

The drum is played only with hands. The Sanskrit name of the nambiar, "Pānivāda", derives from 'pāni', meaning "hands", and 'vāda', from the verb 'vādanam', meaning "playing".

Mizhavu is treated as a "Brahmachaarya" and it is considered sacred. It is used to accompany the holy ritualistic temple performance of Koodiyattam and Koothu. Only Ambalavasi Nambiar community members are allowed to play it inside temples or Koothambalams still.

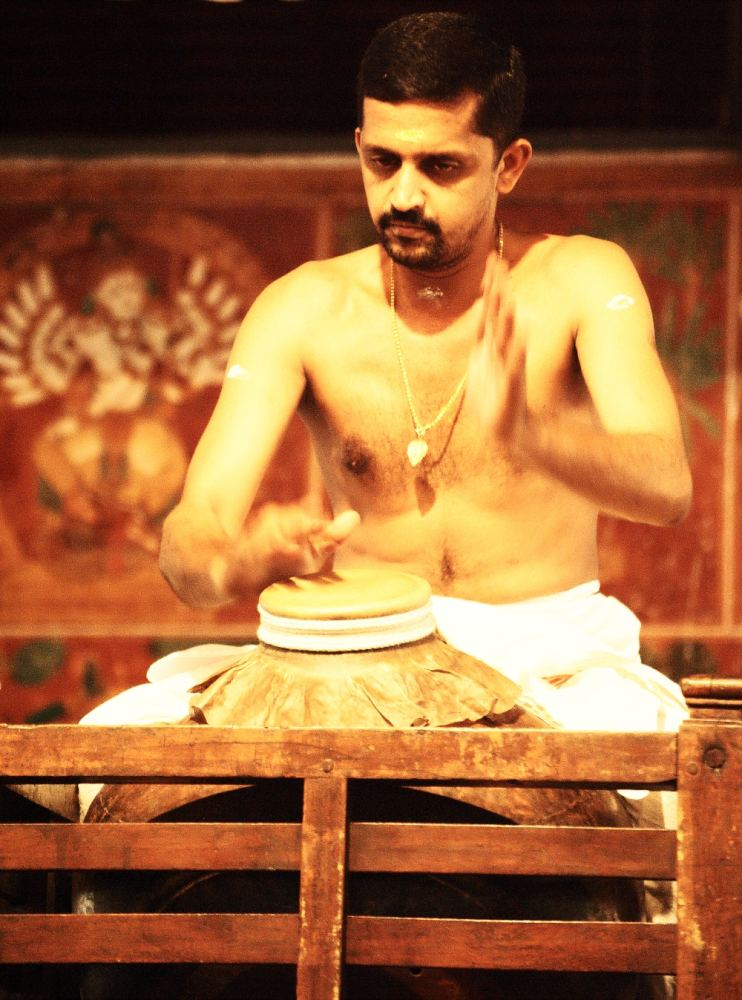
Kalamandalam Achuthanandan playing Mizhavu for Chakyar Koothu

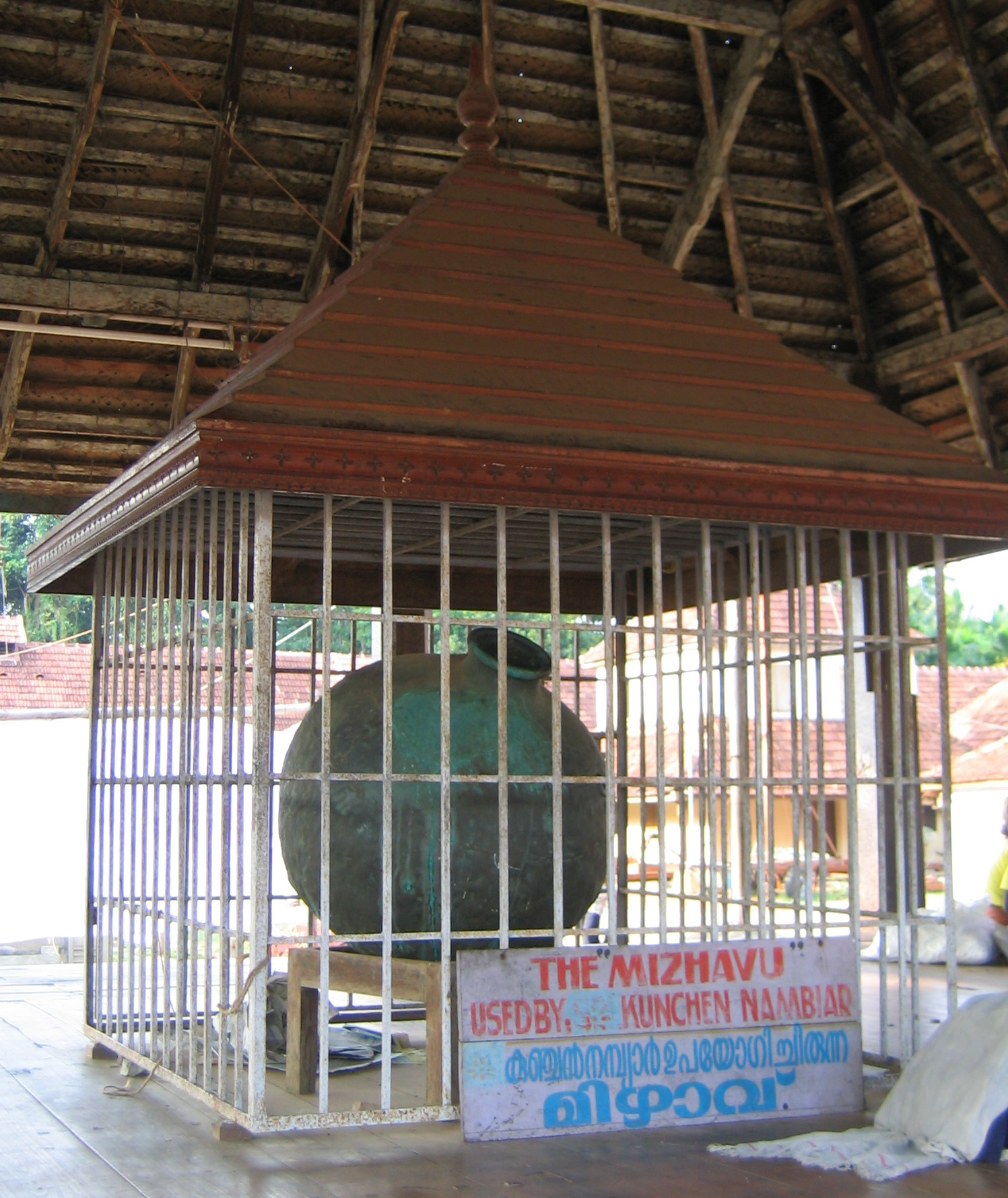
Mizhav used by Kunchan Nambiar, which is kept in Ambalappuzha Sree Krishna Swamy Temple

== See also ==
- Māni Mādhava Chākyār
- Nātyakalpadrumam
- Chakyar Koothu
- Koodiyattam
- Nambiar (Ambalavasi)
- Chakyar
- Mani Damodara Chakyar
- Kathakali
- Mohiniyattam
- Thulall
