= Ammannur Rajaneesh Chakyar =

Indian actor

- Born: 30 January 1981 (age 45); Irinjalakuda, Thrissur, Kerala
- Occupations: Kutiyattam Practitioner, Trainer, Choreographer.

Ammannur Rajaneesh Chakyar is well known Kutiyattam artist from Thrissur, Kerala, India. He was trained under his grand uncle Padmabhushan Dr. Guru Ammannur Madhava Chakyar. for Fifteen years at Ammannur Gurukulam with the Scholarship from Sangeet Natak Akademi, New Delhi.

After the systematic training under his Guru, he is capable to present different characters with subtle Satwika Abhinaya. He widely performing and teaching in India and Abroad.

== Notable roles ==
- Ashwatthama in Urubhangam directed by G Venu of Natanakairali
- Kali in Nala-Damayanthi
- Ravana in Thoranayudham Kūțiyāțțam (Kailasodharanam and Parvathiviraham)
- Parasurāma in Parasurāmavijayam directed by himself
- Bali and Sugreeva in Balivadham Kūțiyāțțam
- Ravana and Jatayu in Jatayuvadham Kūțiyāțțam
- Shurpanakha with Ninam
- Vidūshaka Roles in different Kūțiyāțțam

== Reception ==
VR Prabodhachandran Nayar from The Hindu remarked "Ammannur Rajaneesh Chakyar enacted these events convincingly and with attention to fine detail such as Kali’s suffering in the scorching summer and the first drop of rain falling on his body."
