= Ambalavasi =

Group of Hindu castes in Kerala, India

Ambalavasi, more properly Ampalavasi, (IAST: Ampalavāsi, IPA: [ɐmbɐlɐʋaːsi]; lit. 'temple-dwelling') is the generic name for a group of castes among Hindus in Kerala, India, who have traditionally rendered temple services.

== Castes ==
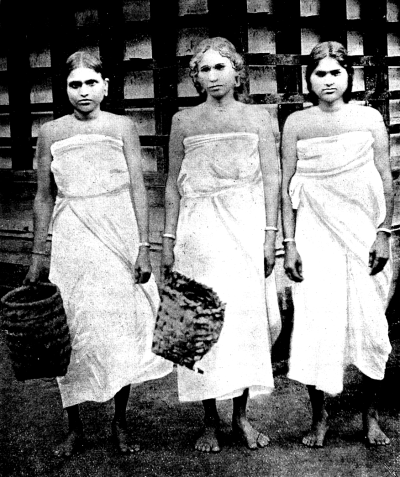
Ampalavasi women with flower baskets- An old image

The Ambalavasis are broadly divided into two groups, being those who wear the sacred thread and those who do not.

=== Sacred thread wearers ===
==== Pushpakan ====
- Pushpaka (Pushpakan Unni)
- Theeyatt Unni
- Puppalli
- Plappalli (Pilappalli)
- Nambidi
- Nambeesan

=== Threadless Ambalavasis ===
- Pisharody
- Marar
- Varyar
- Pothuval

==== Others ====
- Chakyar
- Nambiar
- Kurukkal
- Padamangalam

== Temple services ==
Though all Ampalavāsis have to do service in temples, they have sufficiently distinct functions to perform. Pushpakans and Nambeesans are teachers in the Pathasalas or Mutts and suppliers of flowers to temple. Chakyar stages dramas called Kooth and Koodiyattam. Marars are temple musicians. Variar and Poduval performed managerial and executive functions of temple committees and served as storekeepers and watchmen.

== Social status ==
Their ritual rank in Hinduism lies between that of a Brahmin and Nair. Ambalavasis who wear the sacred thread are Brahmins, while those who do not wear the thread, are not considered Brahmins in temple rituals. Ambalavasis were known as Antharala Jathikal.

== Kazhakams ==
Kazhakams or Ambalakkazhakams refer to associations of Ambalavasi peoples in a temple to perform specific duties in the temple.

== Temple arts ==
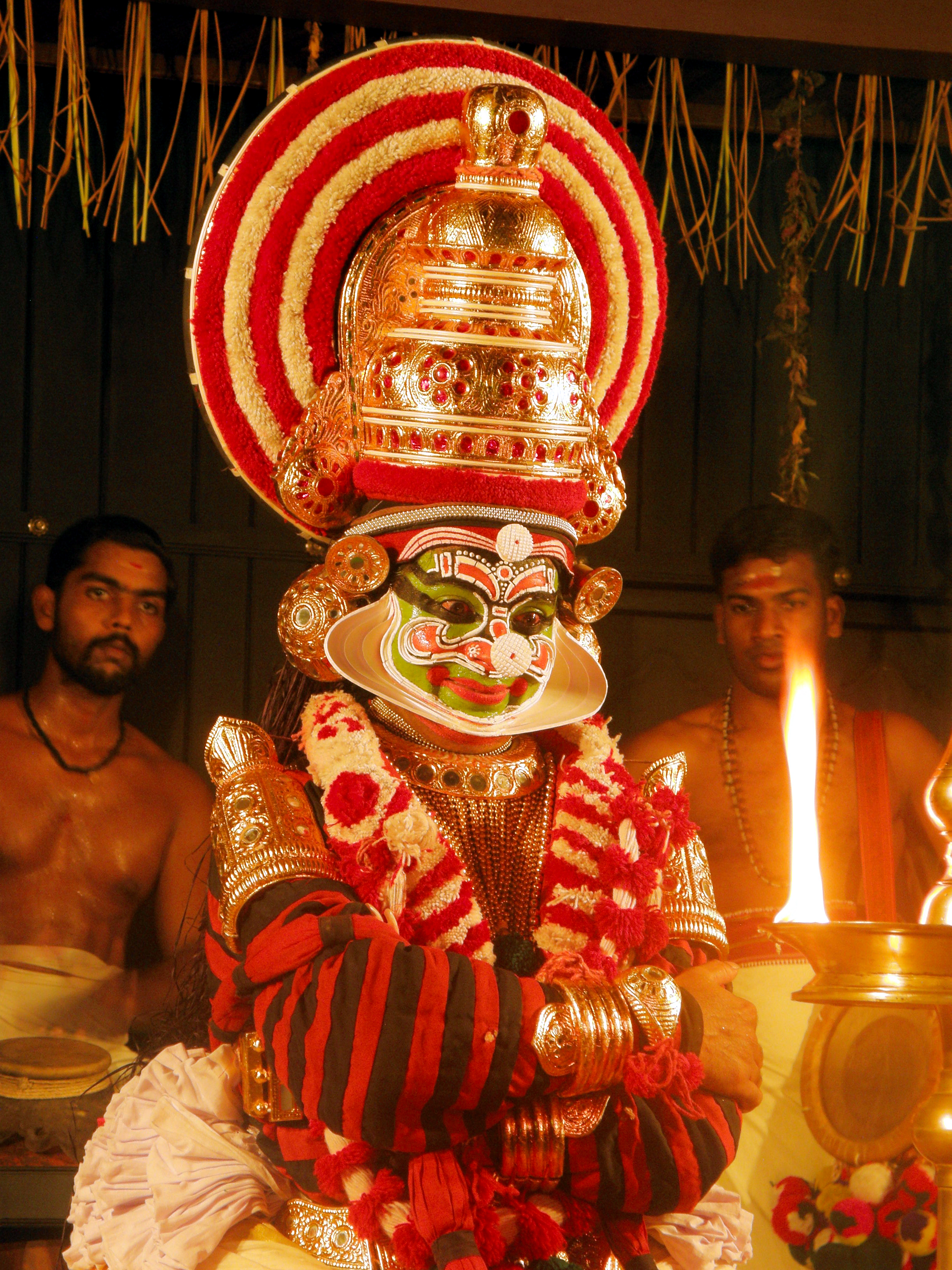
Koodiyattam

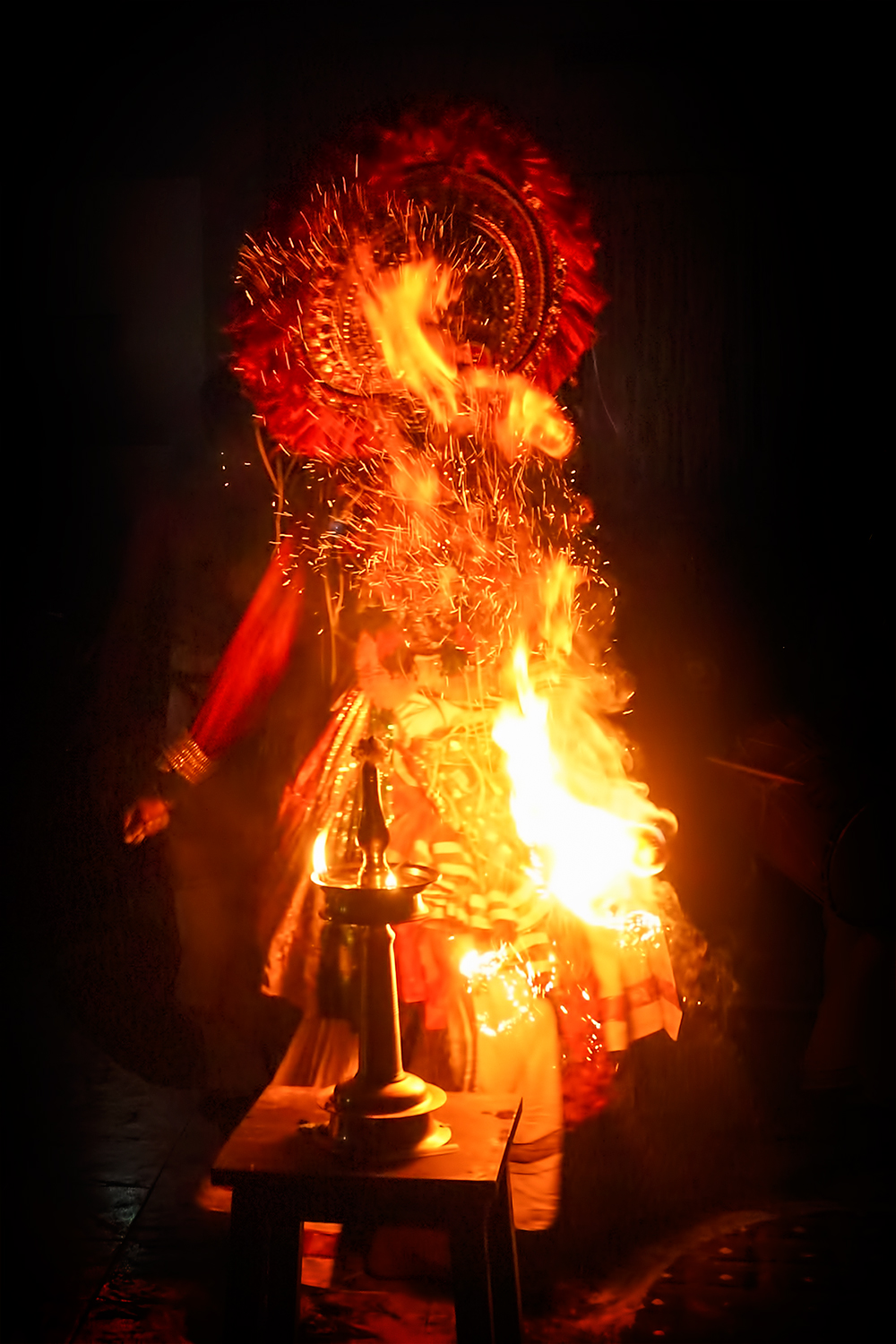
Theeyattam

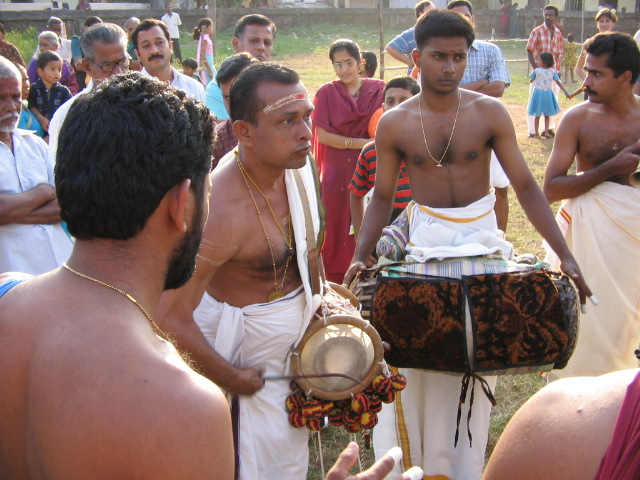
Idakka artist Sri. Chendamangalam Unnikrishna Maarar in action - In the middle.

Traditionally, Ambalavasis are associated with various types of temple arts. Earlier, each of these temple arts were performed only by specific Ambalavasi castes. Now there is no community or caste barrier.

Temple Art	Associated Ambalavasi castes
Koodiyattam	Chakyar
Kooth	Chakyar, Nangyar (women of Nambiar)
Certain roles of Krishnanattam	
Mizhavu (Musical Instrument)	Nambiar
Thullal	
Pathakam	Nambiar
Theeyattu	
Ilathalam (Musical instrument)	
Vadyams (Musical instruments) like Chenda, Thimila, Idakka, Udukku etc.	Marar
Sopanasangeetham	
Panchavadyam	
Thayampaka	
Pandi Melam	
Panchari Melam	
Brahmanippattu	Brahmani (women of Nambeesan)
