= Nambeesan =

Caste in Kerala, India

Nambeesan (also written as Nambisan, Nambissan, Nambiyassan or Nampeesan) is a Ambalavasi caste of Kerala, India.

== Brahmanippattu ==
The women of the Nambeesan caste, known as Brahmani Ammas, are entitled to perform Brahmanippattu, a type of domestic devotional offering performed usually in connection with marriages.

== See also ==
- Pushpaka Unni
