= Chakyar koothu =

South Indian performance art

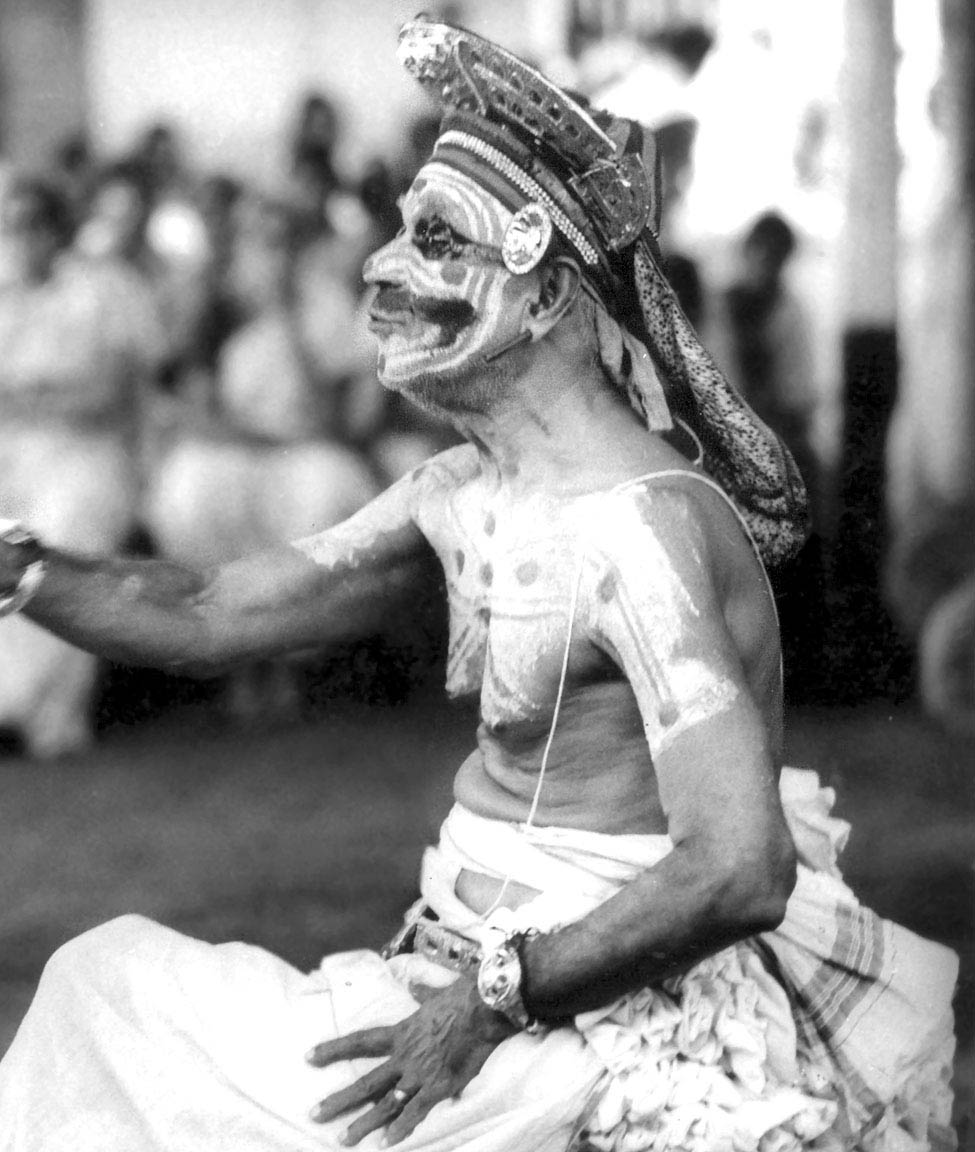
Guru Padma Shri Mani Madhava Chakyar performing Chakyar koothu

Chakyar Koothu (pronounced [tʃaːkjaːr kuːt̪ːɨ̆]) is a performance art from the Indian state of Kerala. It is primarily a type of monologue where the performer narrates episodes from Hindu epics (such as the Ramayana and the Mahabharata) as well as Puranas. Sometimes, however, it is also a traditional equivalent of a modern stand-up comedy performance, including commentary on current sociopolitical events (as well as personal comments directed at audience members).

== The performance ==
"Koothu" means dance ... which is a misnomer, as the art emphasizes facial expressions with minimal choreography. It is performed in the Koothambalam; a place inside Hindu temples specifically designed for performing Kutiyattam and Chakyar Koothu. Ideally, the performance takes place in conjunction with festivals, presented by members of the Chakyar community along with the Ambalavasi Nambiars.

It is a solo performance, by a narrator in a distinctive headgear and black moustache with his torso smeared with sandalwood paste and red dots all over the body. The headgear resembles snake’s hood, to symbolise the narration by Anantha, the thousand headed serpent.

The Chakyar narrates the story based on the Sanskrit style of "Champu Prabandha" - a mixture of prose (gadya) and poetry (shloka). He begins with a prayer to the deity of the temple. He then goes on to narrate a verse in Sanskrit before explaining it in Malayalam. The narration uses wit and humor to draw parallels with current events and local situations.

Koothu has traditionally been performed only by the Chakyar community. Two instruments accompany the performance - a mizhavu and a pair of ilathalam. This is different from the Nangiar Koothu, which is performed by women called Nangyarammas who belong to the Nambiar caste, and is a more highly refined theatre art.

== Māni Mādhava Chākyār ==
Chakyar Koothu was originally performed only in Koothambalams of Hindu temples. It was Natyacharya- meaning a great teacher and practitioner of natyam (dramaturgy), a title accorded in his honour- Padma Shri Māni Mādhava Chākyār, a virtuoso of this art, who took Koothu and Kudiyattam outside the temples to the common people. He was the first to perform Chakyar Koothu for All India Radio and Doordarshan. Many consider him to be the greatest Chakyar Koothu and Kutiyattam artist of modern times. The story goes that his guru, Rama Varma Parikshith Thampuran wrote a Sanskrit champu prabandha called Prahlādacharita and requested some senior artists to study and perform it, but they found it impossible to do. It was then young Māni Mādhava Chākyār's turn to try. He agreed and studied a part of the prabandha overnight and performed it the next day at Tripunithura, then the capital of the Kingdom of Cochin. The incident proved his mastery of both Sanskrit and the classical art forms. After some months, he performed the entire Prahlādacharita on the same stage.

The late Ammannur Madhava Chakyar and Painkulam Raman Chakyar were another important 20th century figure in this art form.

== See also ==
- Arts of Kerala
- Chakyar
- Mani Madhava Chakyar
- Mani Damodara Chakyar
- Painkulam Raman Chakyar
- Kathakali
- Koodiyattam
- Koothambalam
- Mohiniyattam
- Nambiar
- Natyakalpadrumam
- Ottamthullal
- Parayan Thullal
- Panchavadyam
