= Nambiar (Ambalavasi caste) =

Ambalavasi caste of Kerala, India

The Nambiar (also written as Nambyar) is a Hindu Ambalavasi caste of Kerala, India. Ambalavasi Nambiars wear sacred thread like Brahmins and is traditionally considered as a different caste to Nairs including same name bearing Nair-Nambiar caste. Ambalavasi Nambiar ladies known as Nangyar.

A section of Nambiars play Mizhavu in temples. Mizhavu is treated as a "Brahmachaarya" and it is considered as sacred. It is used to accompany the holy ritualistic temple performance of Koodiyattam and Koothu. Only Ambalavasi Nambiar community members are allowed to play it inside temples.

== See also ==
- Kunchan Nambiar
- Mizhavu
- Ottan Thullal
- Chakyar koothu
