= Chakyar =

Priestly caste within the Ambalavasi community

Chakyar (also spelled Cakyar, Chakkiar, Chakiar, etc.) is a priestly caste within the Ambalavasi community of Hindus in the Kerala state of India.

== See also ==
- Ammannur Madhava Chakyar
- Ammannur Rajaneesh Chakyar
- Mani Damodara Chakyar
- Mani Madhava Chakyar
- Painkulam Raman Chakyar
