= Kalamandalam Balasubramanian =

Indian Kathakali exponent (born 1955)

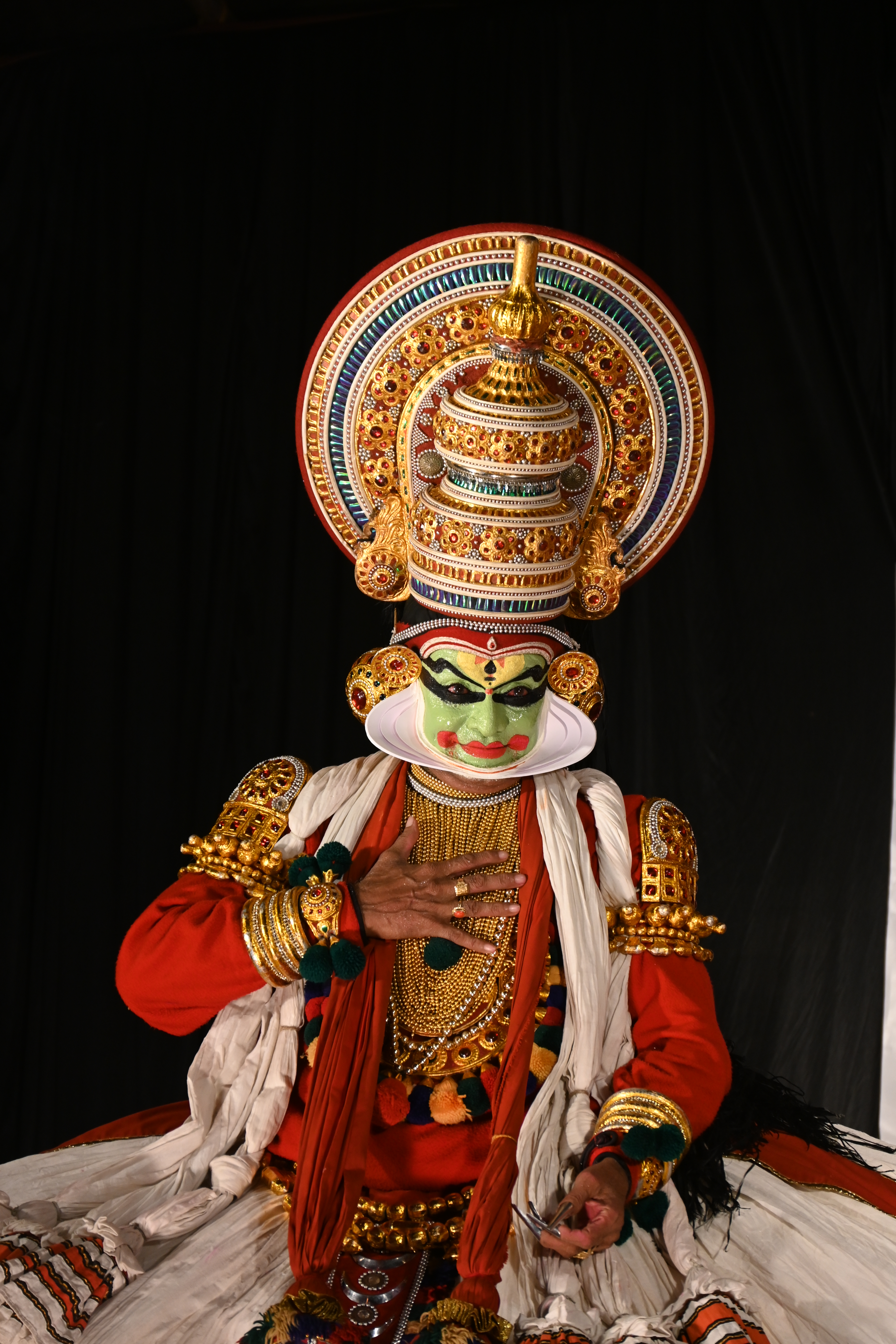
- Born: C. M. Balasubramanian; 26 May 1955 (age 71); Kothachira, Palakkad district, Kerala, India
- Awards: Sangeet Natak Akademi Award (2022); Kerala Sangeetha Nataka Akademi Award (2019); Kerala Kalamandalam Award (2013)

Kalamandalam Balasubramanian is a Kathakali dancer from Kerala in India. He received many awards including Kerala Kalamandalam Award in 2013, Kerala Sangeetha Nataka Akademi Award (2019) by Kerala Sangeetha Nataka Akademi, Government of Kerala, and Sangeet Natak Akademi Award (2022) by Sangeet Natak Akademi, Government of India.

== Biography ==
Balasubramanian was born on 26 May 1955 at Kothachira, in Palakkad district of Kerala. His mother Thankamani Marasyaar and father C. V. Rama Warrier were experts in Carnatic music, and his father was also a Kathakali musician. His father wanted to learn Kathakali, but his grandfather was against it. So he decided to teach one of his children Kathakali. In 1968, at the age of 13, after passing the seventh standard, he was admitted to the Kerala Kalamandalam to study Kathakali. At Kalamandalam he trained in under noted Kathakali exponents like Kalamandalam Ramankutty Nair and Kalamandalam Gopi. Balasubramanian did a six-year diploma in Kathakali vesham from Kalamandalam followed by two-year post-diploma and two-year senior scholarship. He has also completed a one-year Special Advanced Training Diploma under the Central Government Fellowship under the guidance of Kalamandalam Ramankutty Nair.

Balasubramanian currently lives in his apartment in Punkunnam, Thrissur.

== Career ==
After his studies at Kalamandalam, Balasubramanian started teaching Kathakali there from 1979 and retired as the principal in 2011. Later, in 2019, he was again appointed as the Dean of the Kalamandalam Deemed University.

As a performer, Balasubramanian was excelled in portraying both Pacha (good characters) and Kathi (negative characters) roles in Kathakali, and he has portrayed characters like Bhima, Arjuna, Krishna, Nala, Kichaka, Narakasura, Duryodhana, Ravana, Hanuman, Balabhadra, Parashurama and Kattala. He follows the Kalluvazhi style of Kathakali, a style developed by Pattikkamthodi Ravunni Menon, in his characters. In addition to his performances in various venues in India and abroad, he has conducted workshops and lecture demonstrations at various universities and colleges worldwide including the Davis & Elkins College in 1981, and University of Warsaw in 2004.

Balasubramanian is also an empaneled artist of the Indian Council for Cultural Relations.

Balasubramanian has also been involved in the making of several documentaries and films, including the 2008 documentary film Pacha, based on his life and works, the educational film What is Kathakali? produced by the Kerala Kalamandalam, Mohiniyattam by M. T. Vasudevan Nair, Krishna Kutty Poduval by P. V. Chandran and Mahabharatha by Milena Salvini, Vanaprastham by Shaji N. Karun, Desadanam by Jayaraj. He was the main advisor for actor Mohanlal who played lead character of a Kathakali performer in the film Vanaprastham.

Balasubramanian has also written two books, Kannum Poovum (Eye and Flower) on Kathakali and Markandeya Charitam Aattakatha (an Aattakatha based on the life of sage Markandeya).

== Awards and honors ==
Balasubramanian received many awards and honors including David Bolland Gold Medal by Kerala Kalamandalam in 1974, Kalahamsam in 2003 from Ernakulam Kathakali Club, Painkulam Ramachakyar Puraskar in 2011, Kerala Kalamandalam Award in 2013 and Kerala Sangeetha Nataka Akademi Award in 2019, Amaravati Lifetime Achievement Award from the Amaravati Nrityotsava Festival in Vijayawada in 2020 and Sangeet Natak Akademi Award for Kathakali for the year 2022. In 2023 he received the first Guru Chemancheri Kunhiraman Nair award instituted in the memory of Kathakali maestro Chemancheri Kunhiraman Nair and constituted by Cheliya Kathakali Vidyalayam. In 2024 he received the first Udatham Award instituted in the memory of Kathakali maestro Kalamandalam Vasu Pisharody.
