= Kalamandalam Gopi =

Indian dancer

Vadakke Manalath Govindan Nair
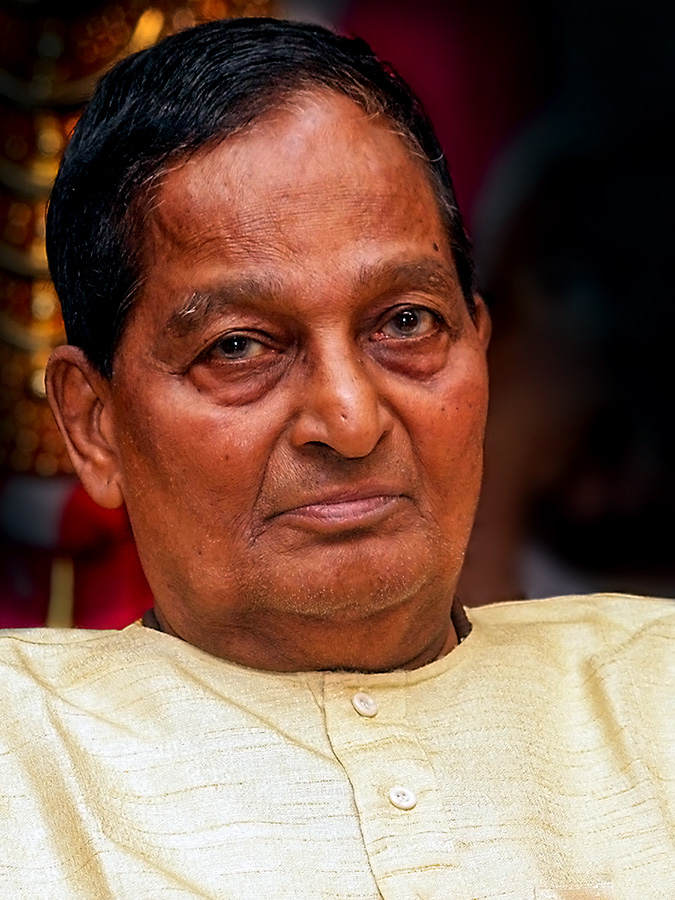
- Kalamandalam Gopi during a public function in 2011.
- Born: 25 May 1937 (age 89); Kothachira, Kerala, India
- Other name: Kalamandalam Gopi
- Occupations: Kathakali Actor, actor

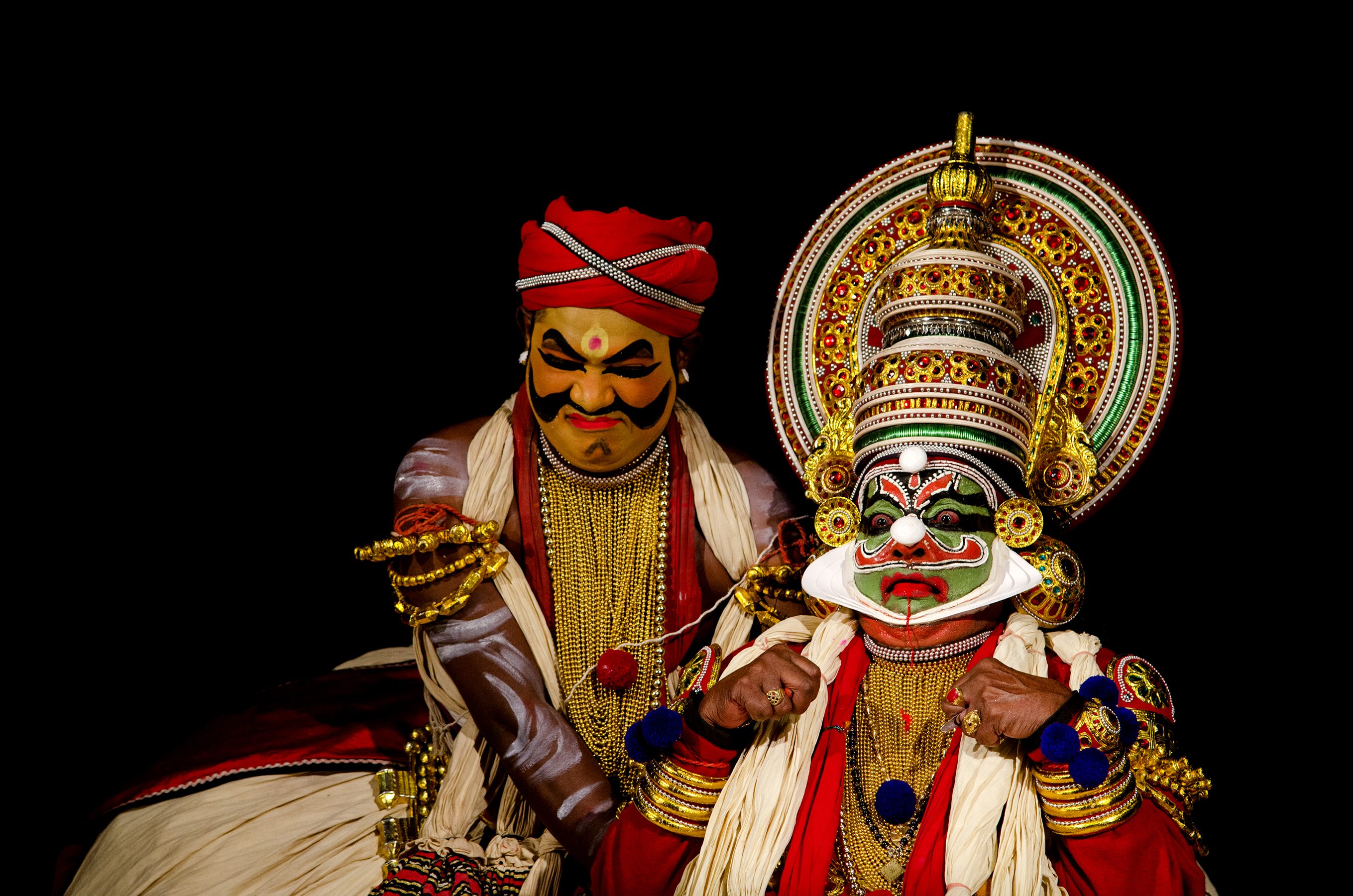
Keechaka Vadham performed by Kalamandalam Gopi

Vadakke Manalath Govindan Nair popularly known as Kalamandalam Gopi, is an Indian dancer who is an exponent of the classical dance-drama style known as Kathakali.

== Life ==
Born as Vadakke Manalath Govindan Nair in the Southern Indian village of Kothachira in Kerala, he completed his formal lessons in the dance from the Kerala Kalamandalam in 1957. He began his career on the Kathakali stage in the 1960s and 1970s, but he had been appointed as a teacher at his alma mater, the Kerala Kalamandalam in 1957, by poet laureate Vallathol Narayana Menon, who had founded the school.

In 1992, Gopi retired from the post as school principal and he is the only living performer of the art to have been appointed by Vallathol Narayana Menon himself. He is considered an icon of this dance performance.

The government of India awarded him the civilian honour of Padma Shri in 2009.

== Dance ==
Gopi is known for the romantic and dramatic portrayal of the virtuous pachcha roles in Kathakali, notable among them being Nalan, Karnan and Rukmangadan. He has also played the choreographically denser roles of Bheeman (in the stories Kalyanasougandhikam or Bakavadham), Arjuna (Subhadraharanam) and Dharmaputrar (that's Yudhishthira in Kirmeeravadham). Gopi is also highly regarded for his portrayal of yellow-faced pazhukka roles and other styles.

Gopi is a disciple of the award-winning Kalamandalam Ramankutty Nair, Kalamandalam Padmanabhan Nair and Keezhpadam Kumaran Nair, and was trained at Kerala Kalamandalam, near Shoranur. Before that, he had a brief career as a practitioner of the more folksy Ottamthullal, the solo dance form with lyrics by the Kunchan Nambiar, a satirical poet. That was followed by his initiation into Kathakali by a leading guru called Thekkinkattil Ramunni Nair at the Koodallur Mana (a mansion of an upper-caste Namboodiri family) near Kothachira.

By the 1960s, Gopi's male protagonist roles were complemented by Kottakkal Sivaraman, who gained name as an exponent of female roles on the stage. The pair still perform on stage together, although Gopi now also works with a younger colleague, Margi Vijayakumar.

== In film ==
Gopi has also acted (without Kathakali make-up or costumes) in several Malayalam feature films like Vanaprastham.

Filmmaker Adoor Gopalakrishnan made a documentary film of Gopi, entitled Kalamandalam Gopi. The film was shown at the International Film Festival of India in 2000, as well as at other festivals in India and abroad. Journalist Meena (Das) Narayan produced and directed a docu-fiction about Gopi in 2010. Titled Making of a maestro, the documentary explores the evolution of Nair from childhood onwards.

== Awards ==
- 1995 – Kerala Sangeetha Nataka Akademi Award
- 2006 – Kerala Sangeetha Nataka Akademi Fellowship
- 2009 – Padma Shri
- 2011 – Sangeet Natak Akademi Fellowship
Various Veshams of Kalamandalam Gopi

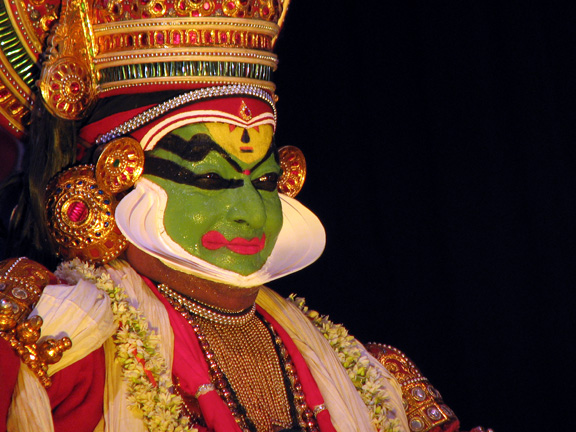
Kalamandalam Gopi as Nalan in Nalacharitham Randam Divasam.

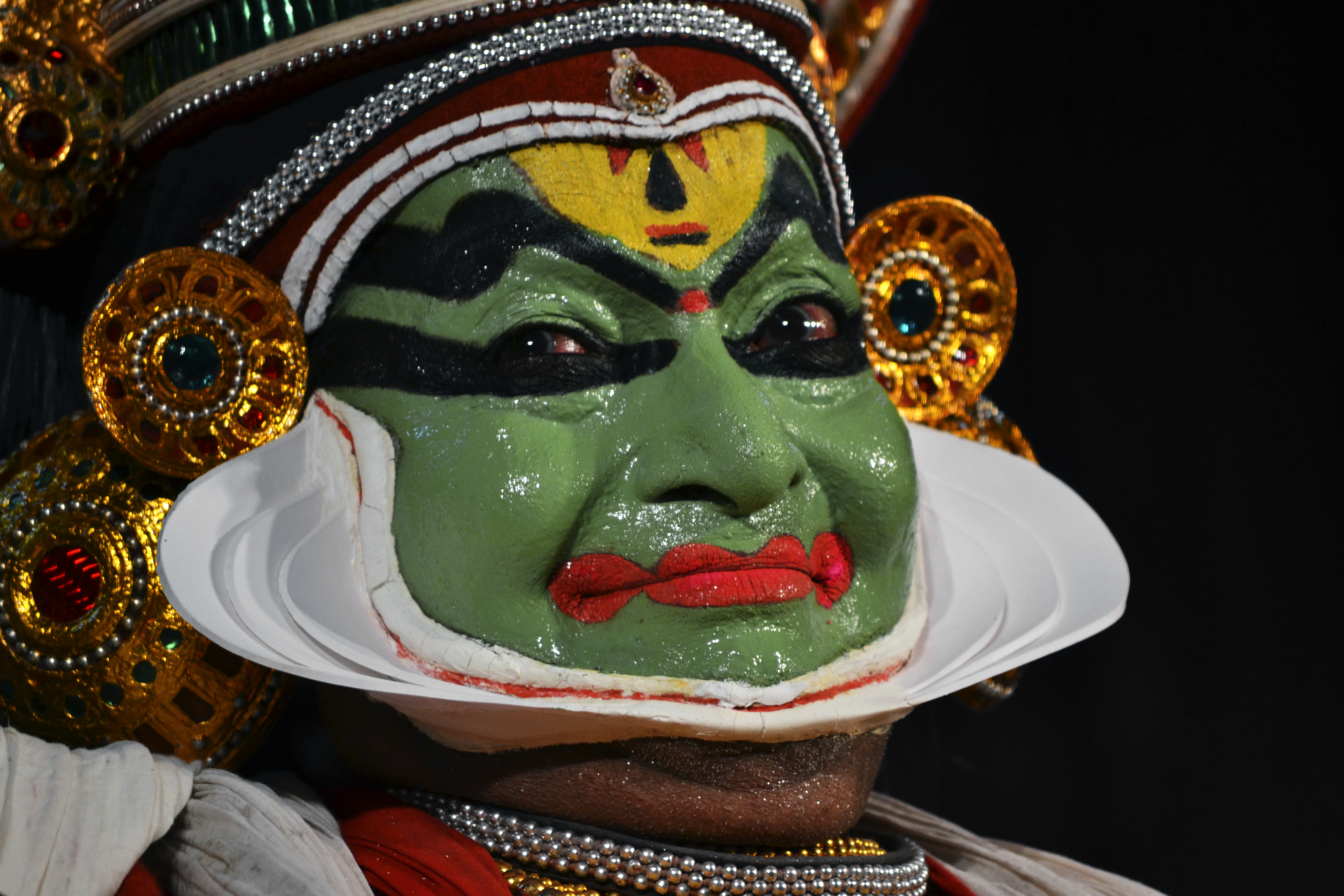
Kalamandalam Gopi as Nalan in Nalacharitham Randam Divasam.

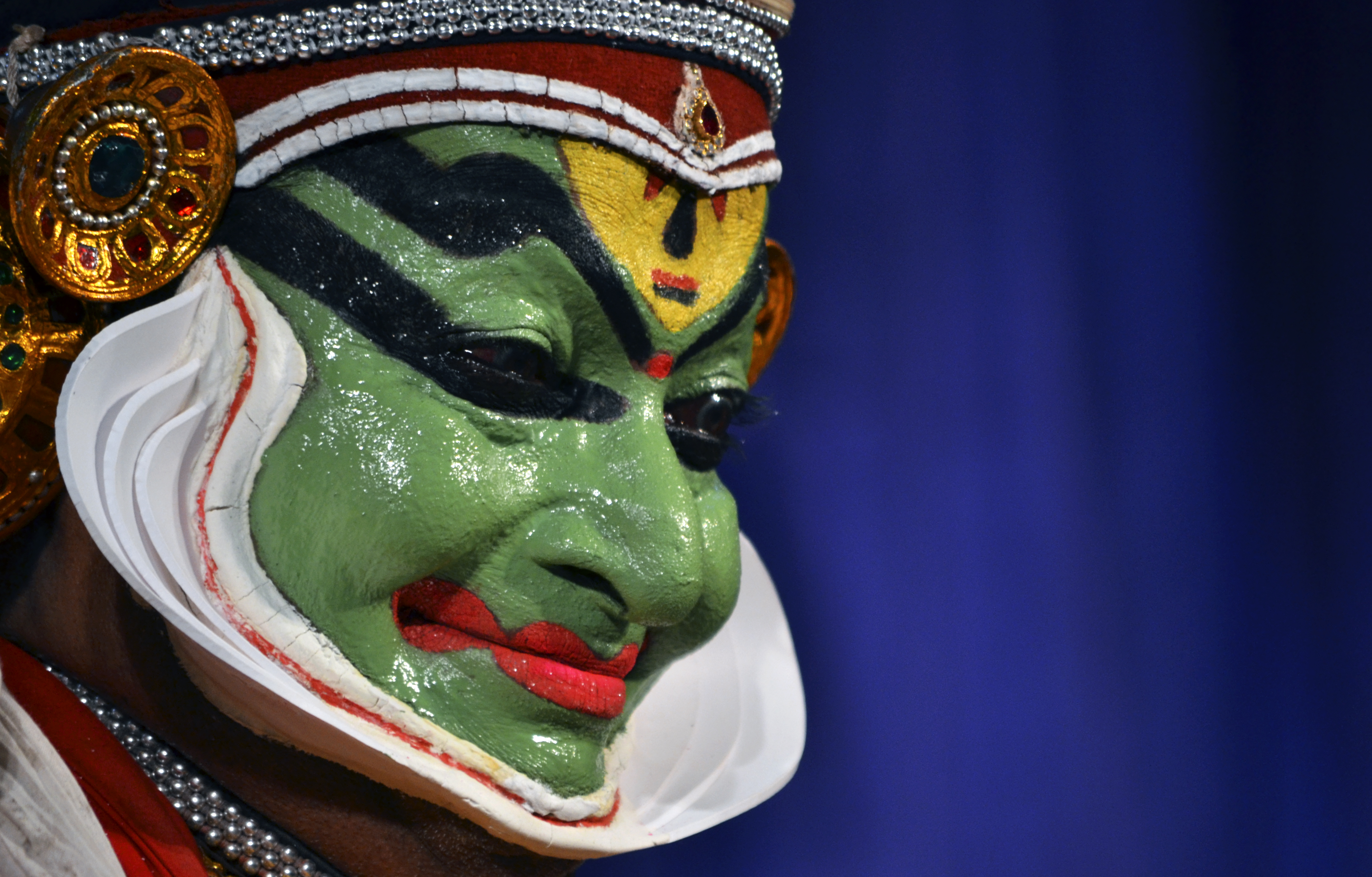
Kalamandalam Gopi as Nalan in Nalacharitham Randam Divasam.

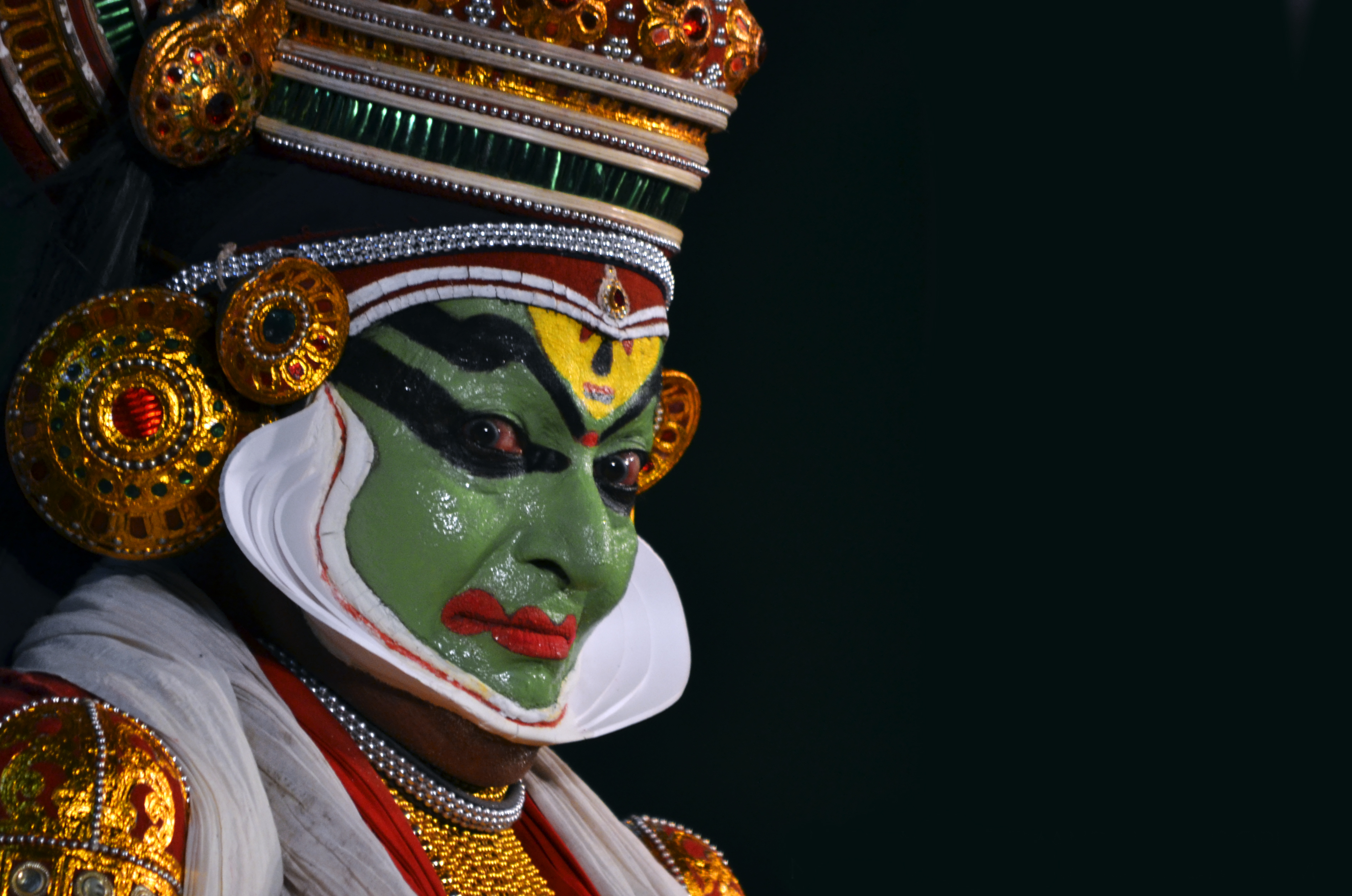
Kalamandalam Gopi as Nalan in Nalacharitham Randam Divasam.

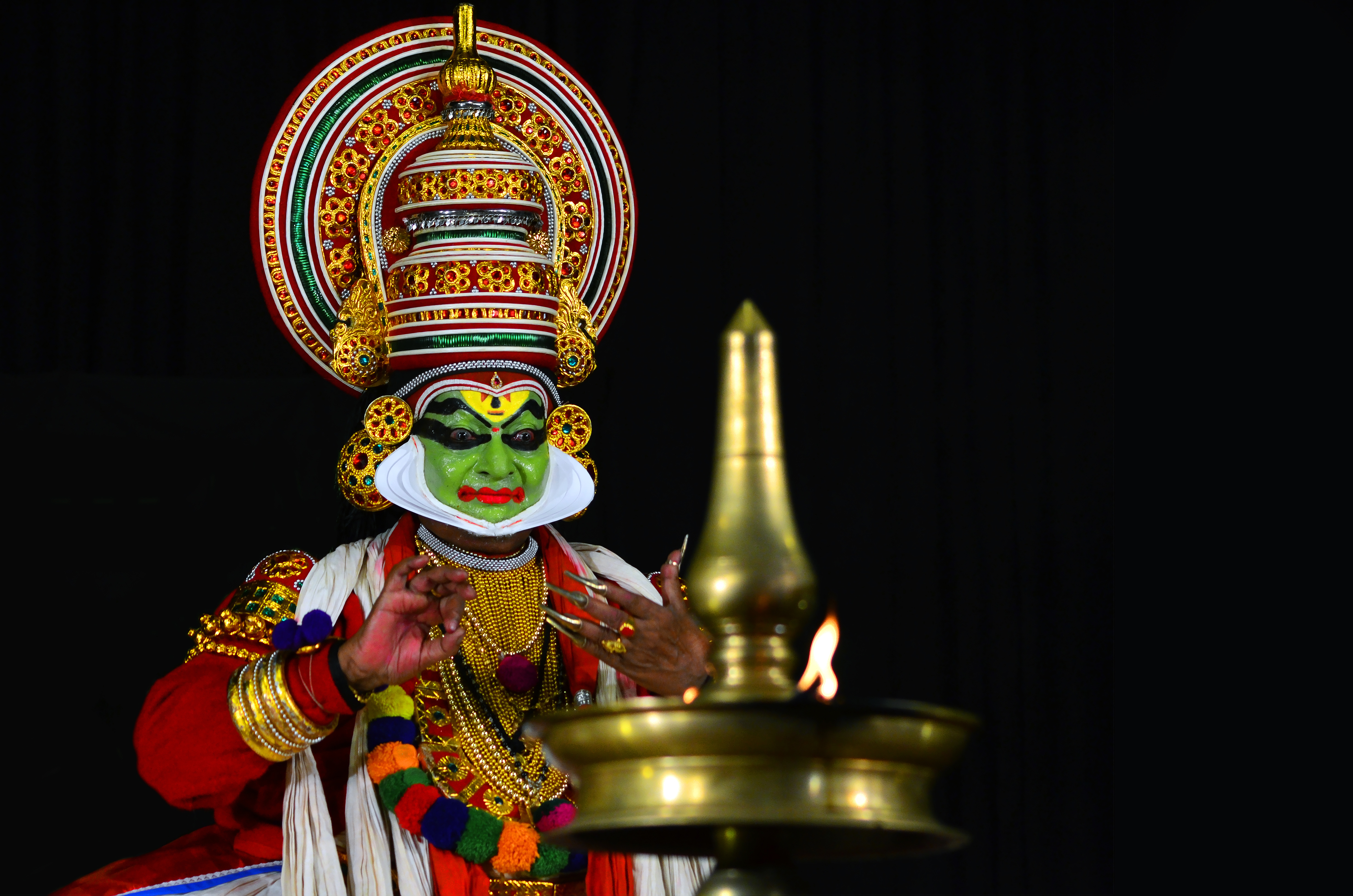
Kalamandalam Gopi as Dasharadha in Dasharadhavilapam.

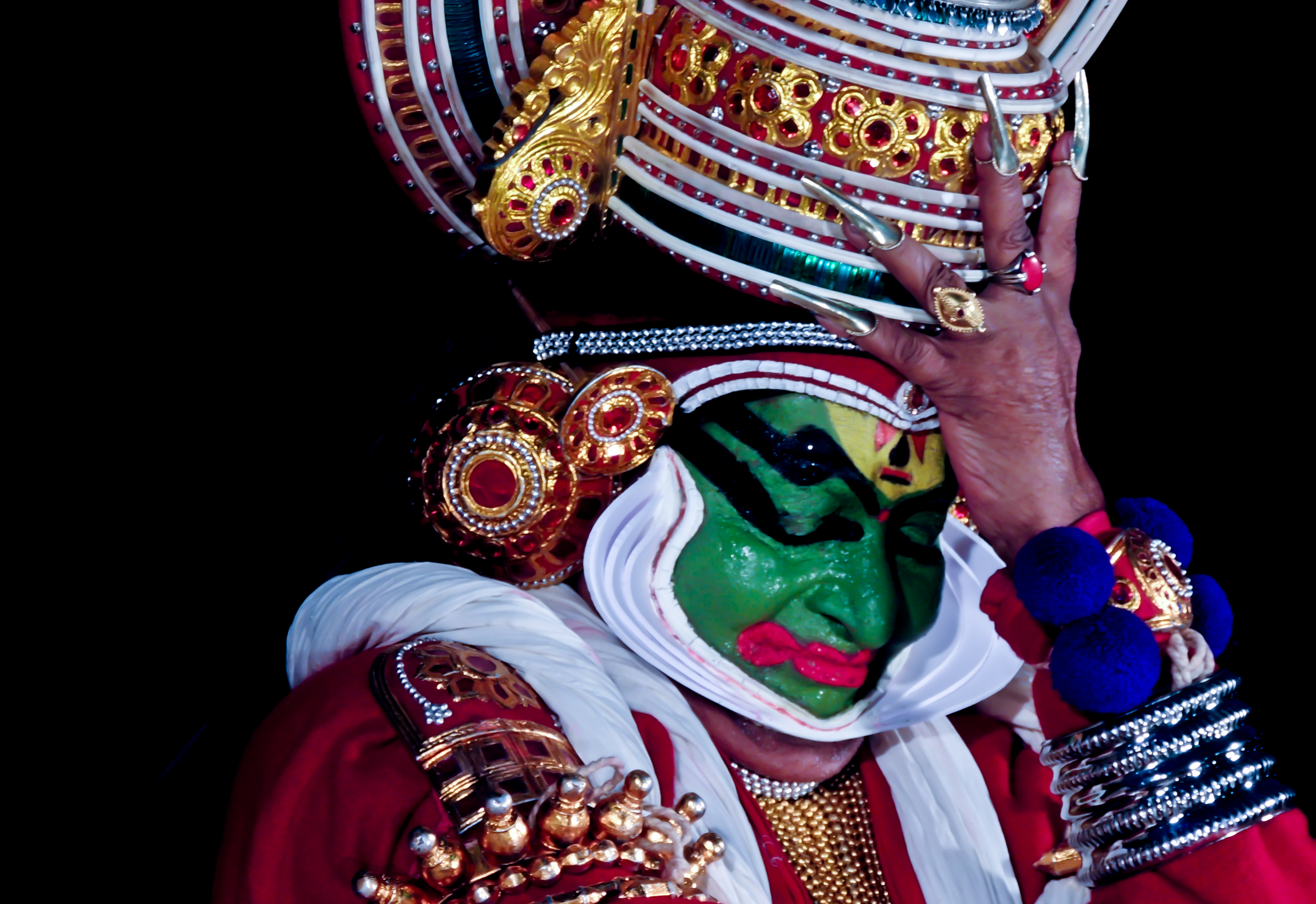
Padmasree Kalamandalam Gopi Asan as Karnan in Karnashapadam.

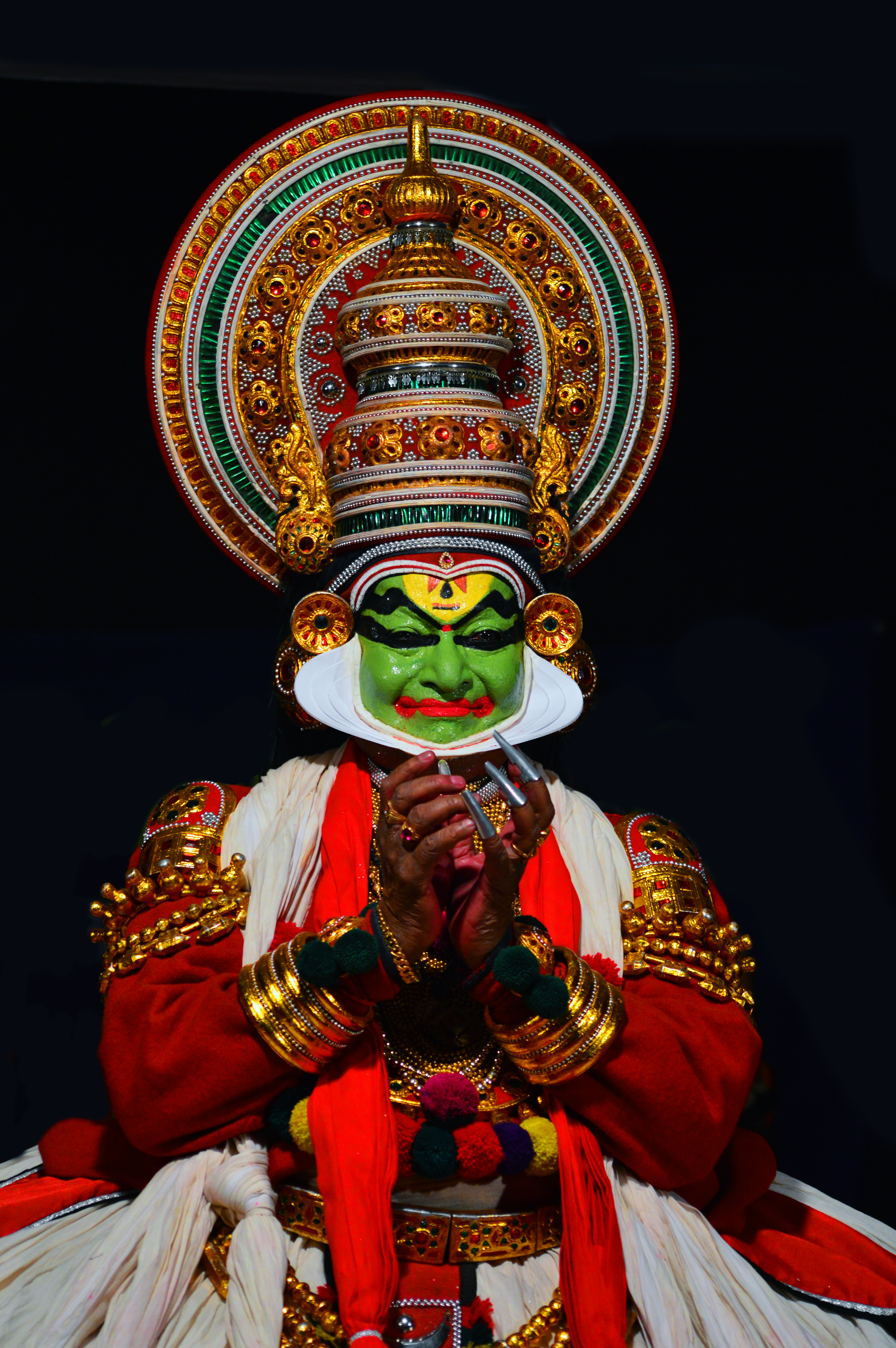
Kalamandalam Gopi as Nalan in Nalacharitham Randam Divasam.
