= Ramankutty Nair =

Indian classical dancer (1925–2013)

Kalamandalam Ramankutty Nair
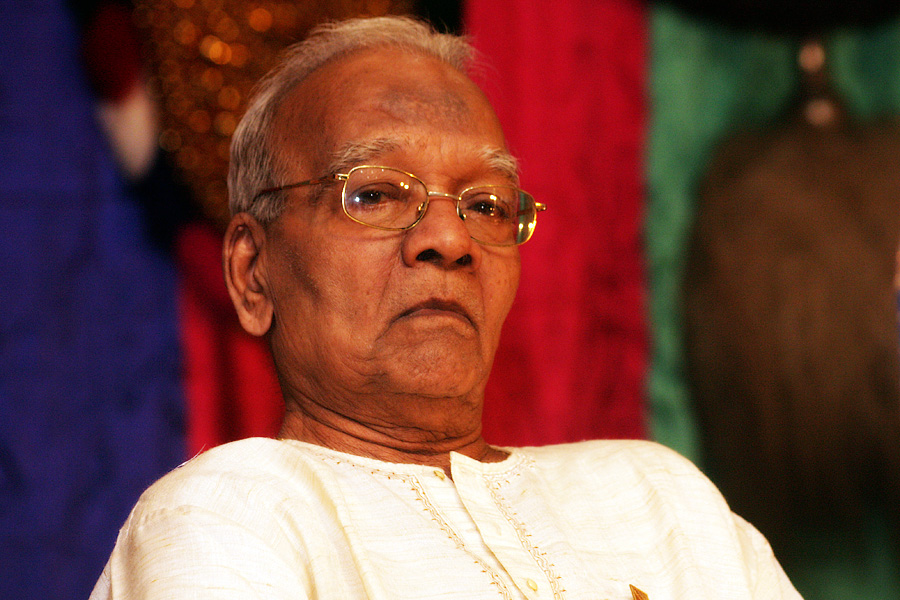
- Kalamandalam-Ramankutty-Nair, at Guruvayur, Kerala (January 2011)
- Born: 25 May 1925; Vellinezhi, Madras Presidency, British India
- Died: 11 March 2013 (aged 87); Vellinezhi, Palakkad district, Kerala, India
- Occupation: Kathakali Artist
- Spouse: Saraswathi Amma
- Children: Narayanankutty, Vijayalakshmi, Appukkuttan

Kalamandalam Ramankutty Nair (25 May 1925 – 11 March 2013) was a performer of Kathakali, who practiced this classical dance form for more than seven decades.

== Biography ==
His guru, and his only teacher through his entire career, was Pattikkamthodi Ravunni Menon. Both hailed from Vellinezhi, which is still known for producing many Kathakali artists in Palakkad district.^{[1]} Ramankutty Nair later served at his alma mater, Kerala Kalamandalam, and went on to become its principal.

Born in 1925, Ramankutty Nair hailed from a family with no Kathakali pedigree. But Ravunni Menon, a resident tutor at the renowned Olappamanna Mana (a mansion of the upper-caste Nambudiris), was an overarching presence in the cultural scene of the village, and Ramankutty Nair admired him and decided to study the art too. At Kerala Kalamandalam, where he subsequently mastered the art, Ramankutty Nair later sculpted out several disciples, the most prominent among them being Kalamandalam Gopi, besides Kalamandalam Vasu Pisharody, M.P.S. Namboodiri, Balasubramanian and the late K. Gopalakrishnan.^{[2]}

Many of the younger generation of Kathakali artistes from Kalamandalam, like Soman and Shanmughan, too,o have had Ramankutty Nair as their guru for advanced training. (He retired as principal of Kalamandalam in 1985). In his later years, Ramankutty Nair was the chairman of Gandhi Seva Sadan, or Sadanam Kathakali Academy, i as it is better known.

Active as an artiste till the age of 85, he performed across Kerala and graced stages in the rest of India and several countries of the world. He was well known for his roles of Ravana in plays such as Thoranayudhamm' and 'Ravanolbhavam', Narakasura in 'Narakasuravadham', Duryodhana in 'Uttaraswayamvaram', Sisupala in 'Rajasooyam', Hanuman in 'Kalyanasaugandhikam', 'Thoranayudham' and 'Lavanasuravadham', Keechaka in 'Keechakavadham', Dharmaputra in 'Kirmeeravadham' and Arjuna in 'Kalakeyavadham'. Another famous role is that of Parasurama in 'Seethaswayamvaram', the costume of which was of his own design.^{[3]}

The generally reticent Ramankutty Nair, who has penned an autobiography named Thiranottam, was a winner of the coveted Padma Bhushan award of the Government of India.^{[4]} Renowned filmmaker Adoor Gopalakrishnan has made an eponymous documentary on Kalamandalam Ramankutty Nair.^{[5]} of Kathakali, and is a film by the same name on him by Adoor Gopalakrishnan.^{[6][7]}

== Personal life ==
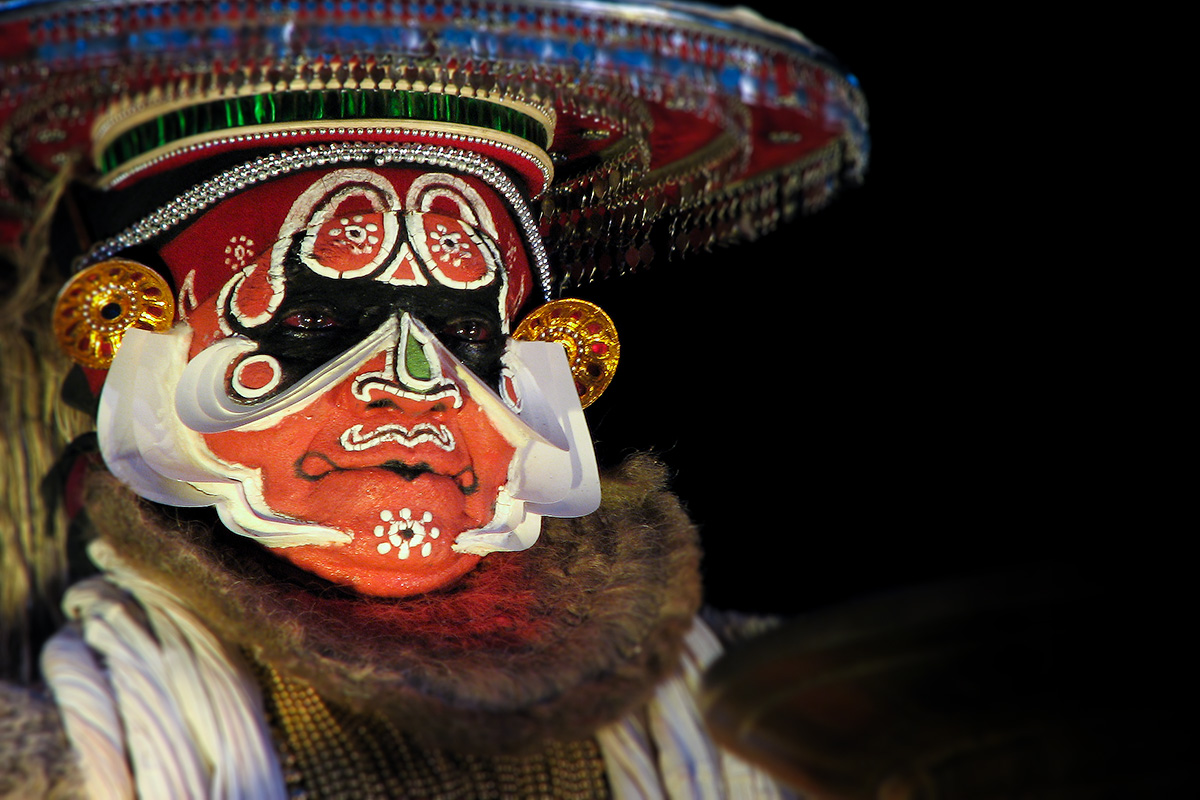
Kalamandalam Ramankutty Nair as Hanuman in 'LavanasuraVadham' Kathakali

Ramankutty Nair lived in his native Vellinezhi with his wife Saraswati. On 15 May 2009, he celebrated his 'Satabhishekam' (84th birthday) amid fanfare in the nearest town of Cherpulassery.

Ramankutty Nair died on 11 March 2013 at age 87.

== Awards ==
- 1974 – Sangeet Natak Akademi Award
- 1985 – Kerala Sangeetha Nataka Akademi Award
- 2004 – Sangeet Natak Akademi Fellowship
- 2007 – Padma Bhushan
- 2010 – Honorary doctorate by Cochin University of Science and Technology
