= Sree Madiyan Koolom Temple =

Hindu temple in Kerala, India

Shri Madiyan Koolom Temple
- ശ്രീ മഡിയൻ കൂലോം
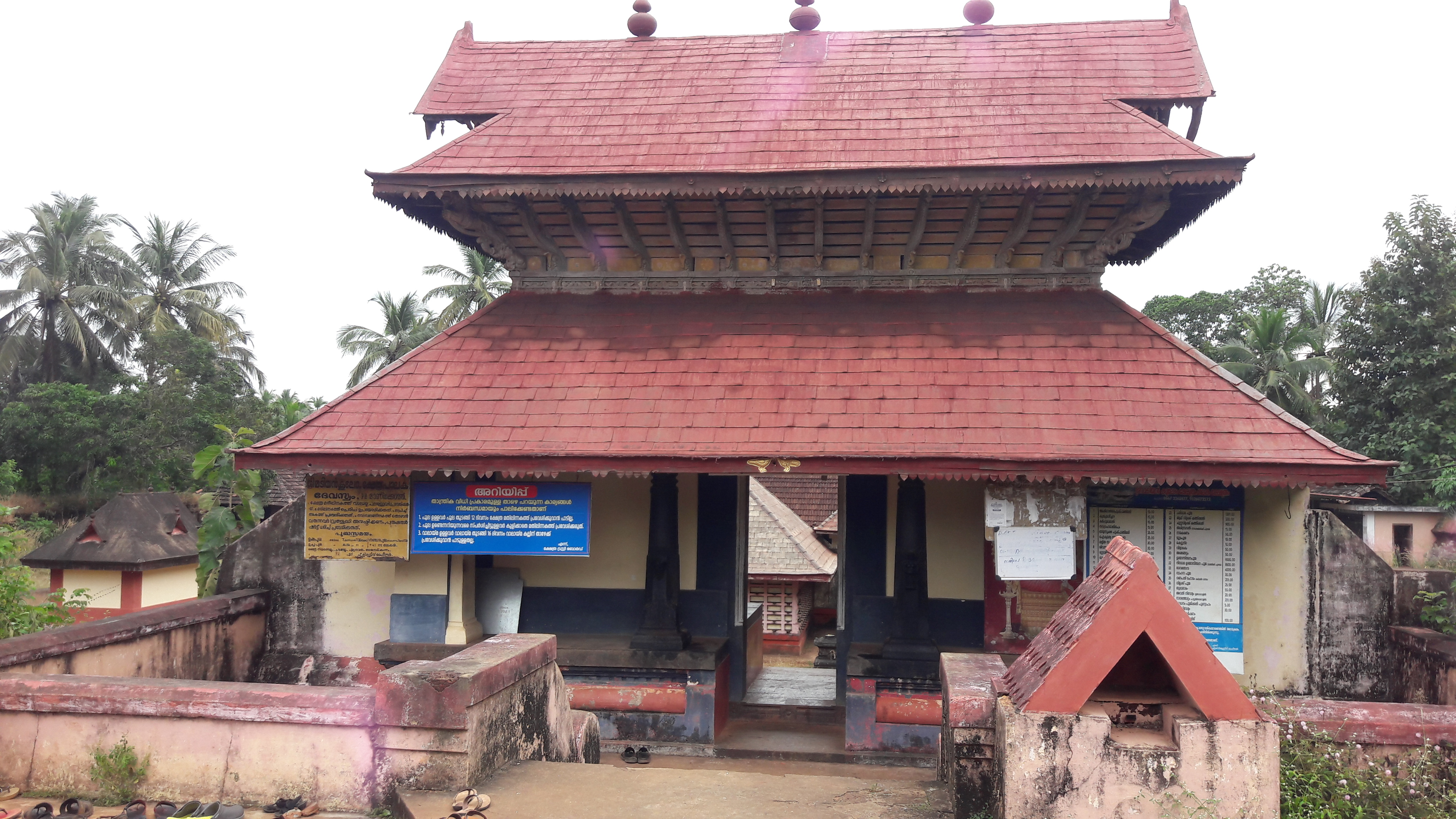
- Sree Madiyan Koolom Temple

- Location

Religion
- Affiliation: Hinduism
- District: Kasaragod District
- Deity: Kalarathri Amma (Goddess Bhadrakali): Kshetrapalan; Nadayil Bhagavathi
- Festivals: Pattu Utsavam; Kalasham Festival
- Governing body: Malabar Devaswom Board

Location
- Location: Kanhangad
- State: Kerala
- Country: India
- Coordinates: 12°21′7″N 75°4′51″E

Architecture
- Type: Hindu architecture, Kerala style

Sree Madiyan Koolom Temple is located near Kanhangad in the Indian state of Kerala. It is one of the most prominent Hindu temples in Kasargod district, and is some 500 years old. It is dedicated to deity Kshetrapalakan Eswaran, the mother Goddess known as Kalarathri Amma (Bhadrakali).

One of the oldest temples in North Kerala, Shri Madiyan Kulam is an ancient shrine. Sri Madiyan Kulam is the headquarters of the Allada Swaroopam Mookatham Nadu. The temple is known for its centuries-old wooden carvings and its epic poems. The poems portray the unity of different religions and castes. A peculiarity of this temple is that a Brahmin priest performs pooja only at noon, while the morning and evening poojas are performed by a sect called Maniyanis.

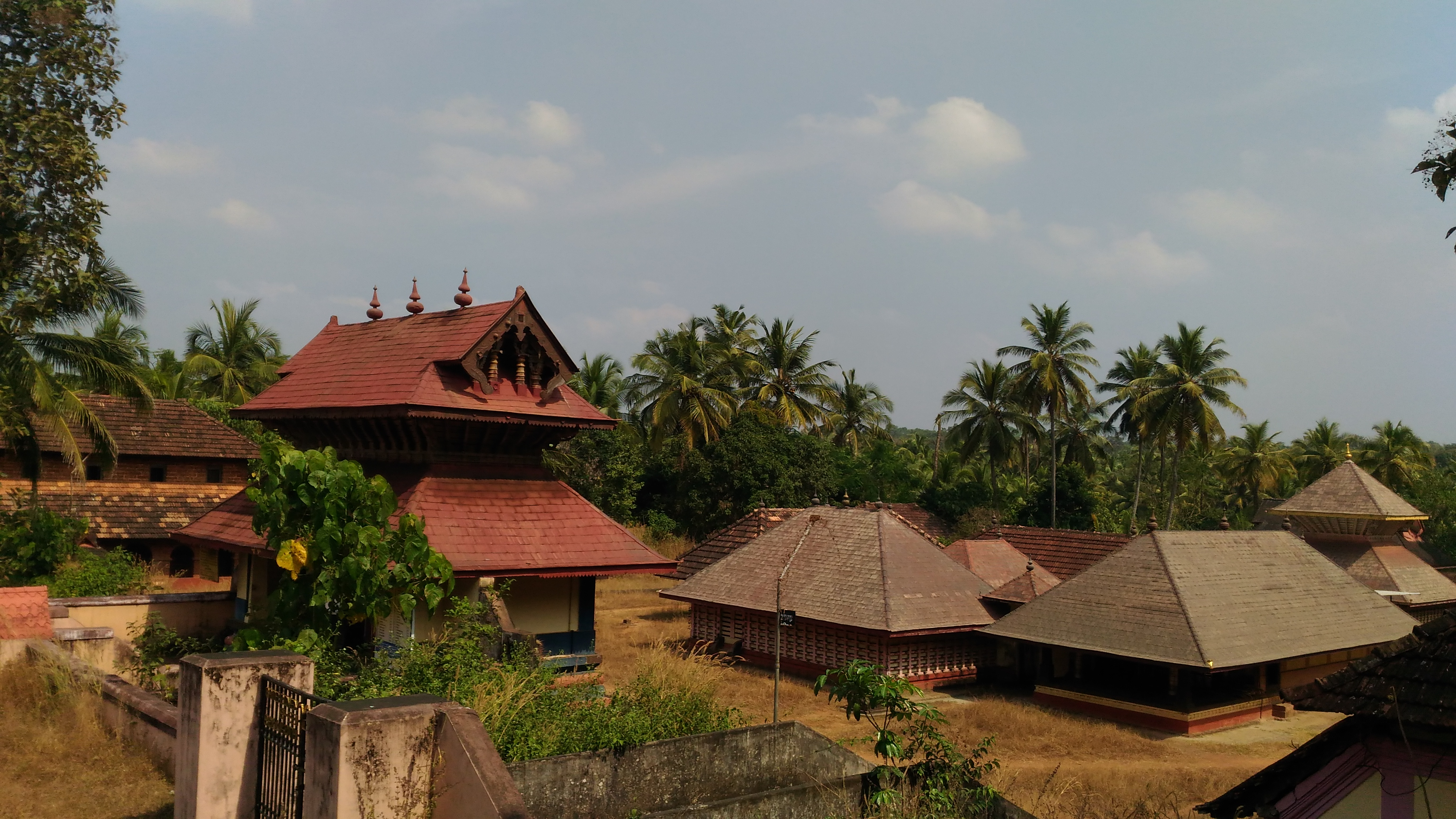
Madiyan Koolom

== Legend and Etymology ==
Kshethrapalakan Eeshwaran is the main deity. Udinur Kovilakam is the head of Alladadesham, which stretches from Chittari to Olavara. Legend states that he decided to 'sit' when he found his niche, once he reached Madiyan on his journey from Udinur along with Vairajathan. He was attracted by the smell of the Appam (which is still an offering in the 'Kooloth Appam temple') that was being prepared for Nadayil Bhagavathi, the main deity of Koolom at the time. Seeing this Sastha and other disciples who were accompanying him called Thampuran Madiya, which means lazy in Malayalam and which later came to be known as Madiyan Kshethra palakan.

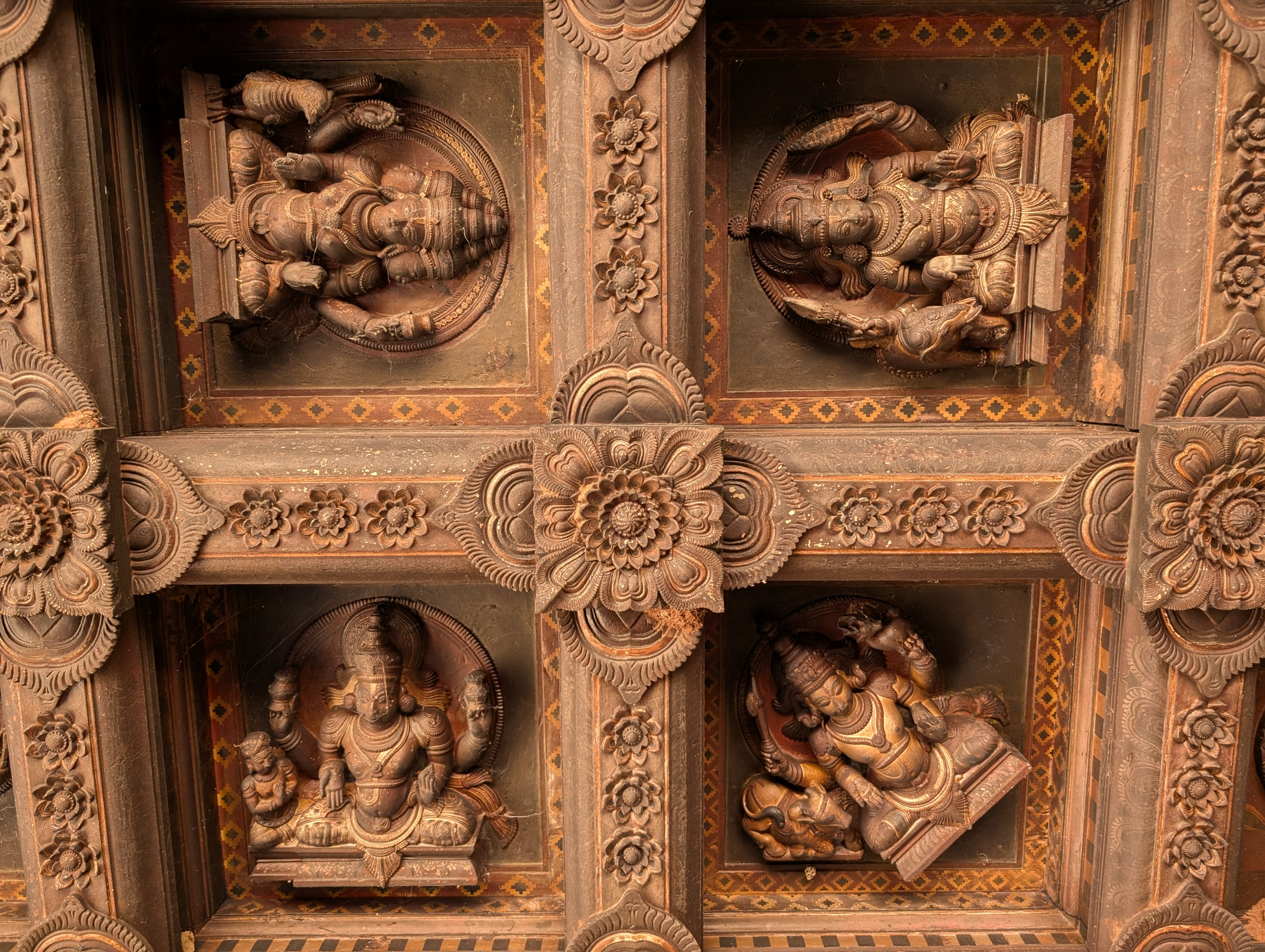
Daru Shilpam, wooden carved ceiling inside temple

Thampuran or Kshethrapalakan later sat on the lap of Kaalarathriamma, a goddess who was in her 'furious form' and enjoyed a Mother's love and affection, eventually positioning himself facing towards the west of the temple. Another popular belief is that the word Madiyan originated from the fact that he sat on the lap (Madi in Malayalam) of Kalarathriyamma. It was also an end to the Shaktheya puja that was performed there before. In memory of Shakteya pooja, kallu (palm toddy) and fish are still brought inside the temple on the day of Kalasham.

== History ==
The origins of the Sri Madiyan Kovilakam are found in devotional stories. It is also famous for a temple that had an entry for lower caste people even before the Temple Entry Proclamation in Kerala.

Eshwaran is the main deity, a symbol of religious unity. The Paattu festival in the month of Dhanu and Kalasham festival in Edavam are held together with unity and harmony, irrespective of castes. The temple exists as a link for Hindu-Muslim unity in the region. The devotion of the Muslims in this area and their respect for other religions was why the site where an Athiyal temple was located was allowed to become the site of the first mosque. The friendship between Muslims and Hindus is visible during the rituals.

The Kshethrapalakan came to the earth under the command of Mahadeva to conquer Allada swaroopam, a town stretching from Chittari River in the north to the "Olavara" River in the south.

It was customary for the kings to name their country Swaroopam in those times. The region was ruled by a local lord, Allohalan. At this time, Kerala Varma, son of Kolathiri, fell in love with Pankipillayathiri Thamburatti of Nediyirippu Swaroopam. In the ensuing protests, they both married. They had a desire to have their own country for their children. So they decided to conquer Allohalan's kingdom. Kerala Verma opened the fortress and owned it. Kerala Varma later worshipped Kshethrapalakan and Kalarathri, who helped him in his conquest. But most of the people around him were the people loyal to Allohalan. For this reason, "Moolchary Nairachan" was appointed in the temple, and he built a palace in Nileshwaram and continued ruling from there along with the queen.

Earlier, outer Kalasham was held during the 2nd of Edavam to worship Nadayil Bagavathi by performing Theyyam, apart from Kshethrapalakan and Kaalarathriamma. It is believed to be complete only if all the country's inhabitants join it, a belief that continues today. Madiyan Koolom still exists as the headquarters of the Alladanadu.

== Order of Darshan ==
The temple follows a particular order to offer prayers or having darshan.

- Naagam
- Perattur Baghavathi
- Maanjali Amma
- Kshethrapalakan Eeshwaran
- Kaalarathriamma

== Architecture ==
The temple covers six 2.4 hectares (6 acres). Half of the area consists of monuments built in traditional Kerala-style. The temple is famous for its sculptures and wooden carvings, depicting ancient stories from Ramayana and other epics. Most of the carvings are found in Thekkini, western Gopuram and the Mandapa near the pond. The Thekkini Mandapam near the temple kitchen has the etchings of Dakshayagam, Seethaswayamvaram and the Vanayathra of Rama and Lakshmana. All the wooden etchings in this temple portion are partially or mostly destroyed due to continuous exposure to smoke from the kitchen. This was reported in the media without response or action by the authorities. Similarly, the wooden carvings of 12 Raashis and Navagraha devatas in the Gopuram pond have been destroyed by painting them silver.

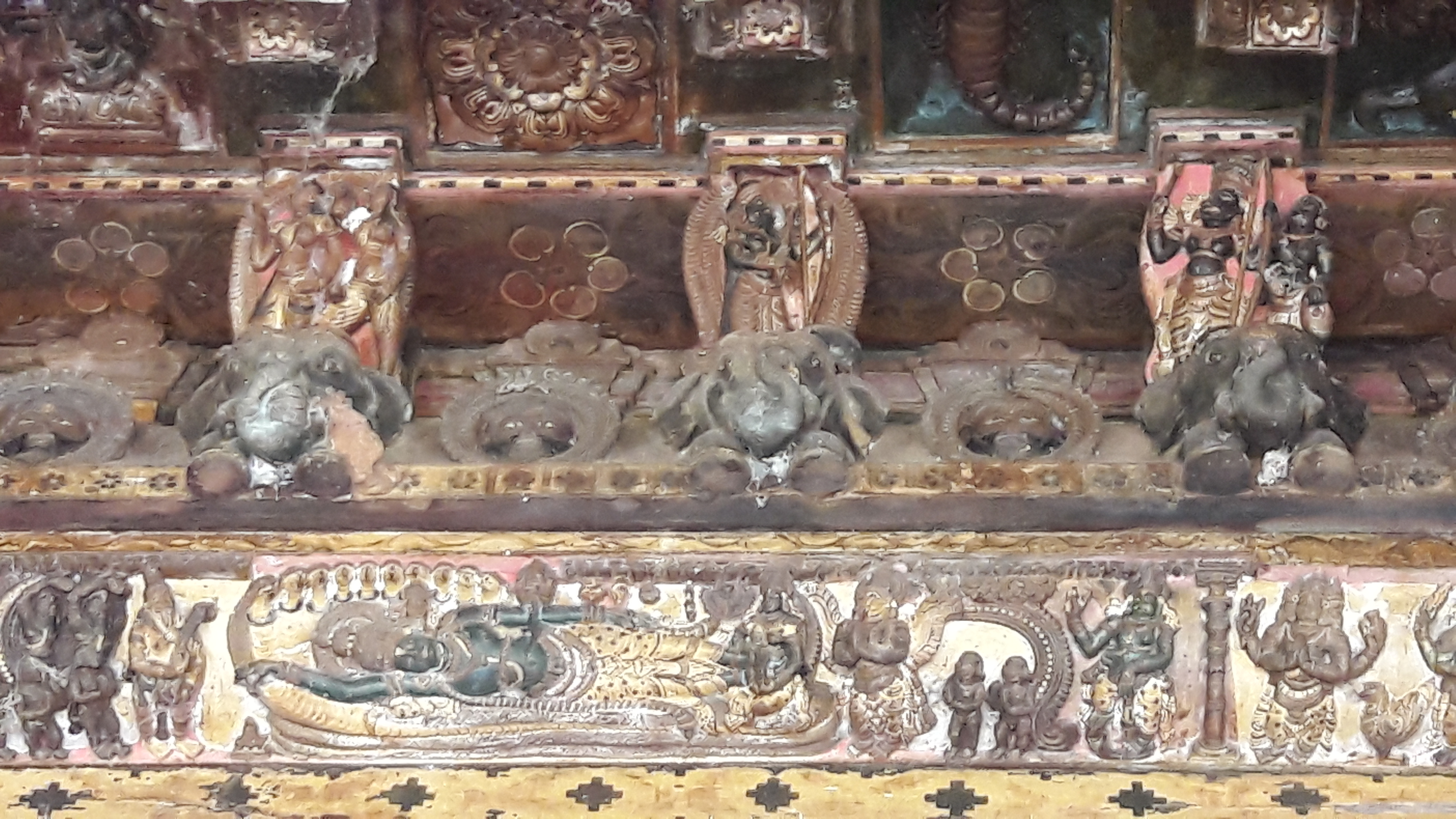
Daru sculpture at Madiyan Koolom Temple, Kasargode, Kerala, India

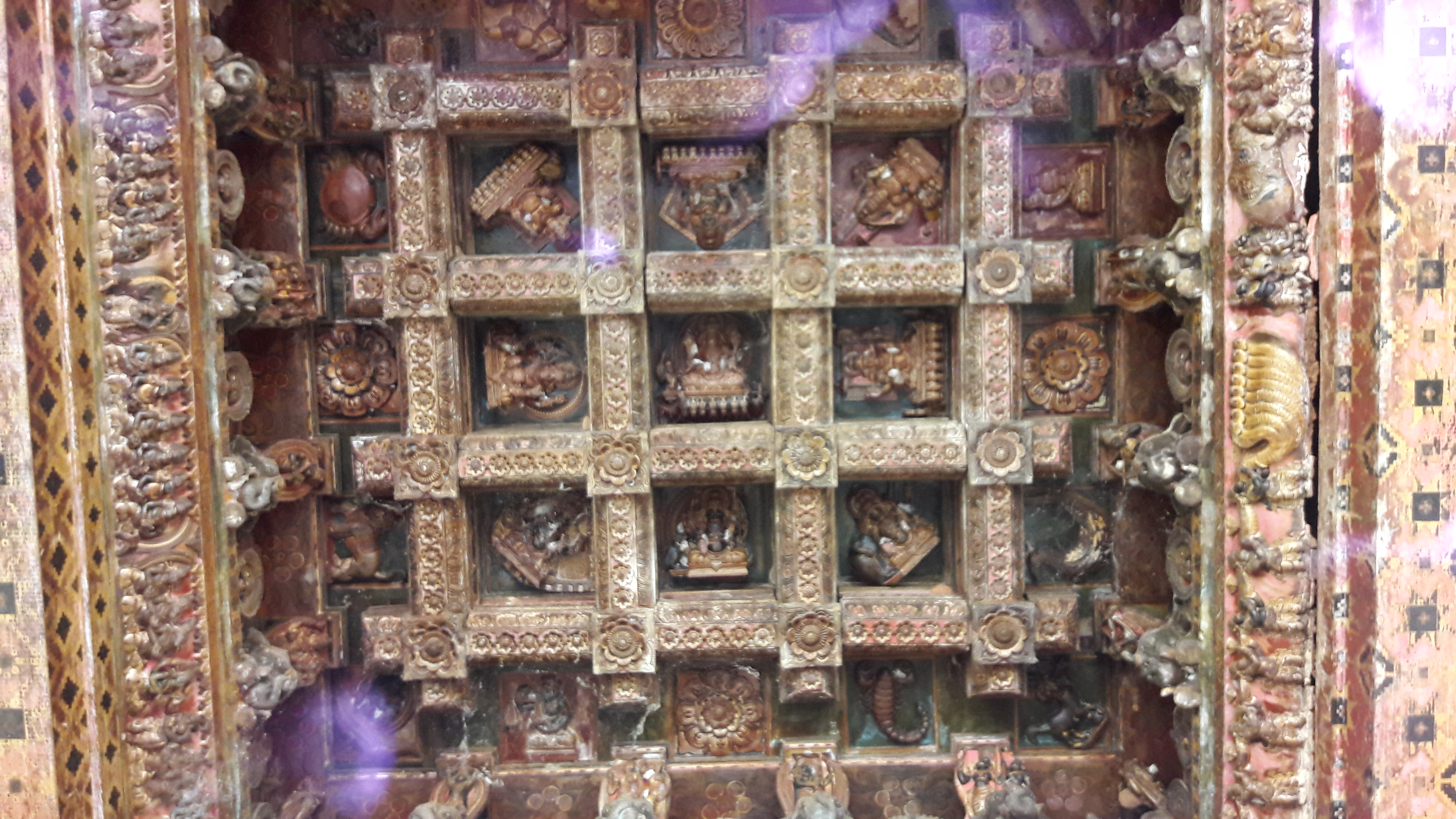
Daru sculpture at Madiyan Koolom Temple, Kasargode, Kerala, India

The western gopuram shows instances of Amruthamadhanam, Kaliyamardhanam and Ananthashayanam. The etchings depicting the churning of the ocean look extraordinarily beautiful. The carvings include erotic wooden etchings similar to those of the Khajuraho temple in Madhya Pradesh. Depiction of mythical characters include 'elephants with feathers'. The use and combination of natural colors obtained from unique plants and trees enhance the aesthetics. A mural painting of the Narasimha avatar of Vishnu is another attraction. The temple houses two ponds. A small sculpture of a 'bowing' elephant is near the entrance, which is believed to curse any elephant about to enter the temple, as elephants are not permitted inside. A sculpture of a snake in one of the ponds is believed to be a curse as legend has it that the snake was sent to spew venom in the pond.

The temple paintings and carvings are in poor condition.

=== Theyyams ===
- Kshethrapalakan Eeshwaran
- Kalarathri Amma
- Nadayil Bhagavathi Theyyam
- Manavalan & Manavatty Theyyam
- Manjaliamma Theyyam

== See also ==
- Kanhangad
- Nileshwaram
- Madhur Temple
- Ananthapura Lake Temple
- Temples of Kerala
