= Margi Vijayakumar =

Indian Kathakali performer

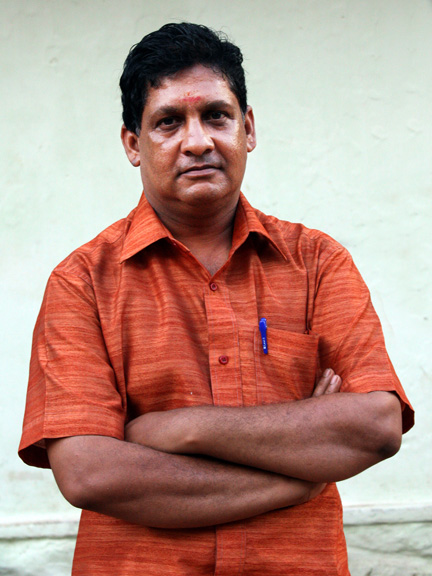
- Margi Vijayakumar at Margi, Thiruvananthapuram on 16 June 2009.
- Born: 30 May 1960 (age 66); Thonnakkal, Thiruvananthapuram, Kerala
- Other name: Margi Vijayakumar
- Occupations: Kathakali Actor, Actor

Margi Vijayakumar is a Kathakali artist who has specialised in female roles in the classical dance-drama from Kerala, south India. A disciple of the late Padma Shri Kalamandalam Krishnan Nair, he has gained name in his poised handling of Purana characters like Damayanti, Panchali, Mohini and Kunti, mostly opposite star dancer Kalamandalam Gopi.

The 1960-born Vijayakumar, a native of Thonnakkal in Thiruvananthapuram district, was initially trained under Thonnakkal Peethambaran, Inchakkattu Ramachandran Pillai, and Mankulam Vishnu Namboodiri. Equally at ease with choreographically dense roles and those that more profile the Kathakali character, many buffs consider Vijayakumar as a legitimate successor to septuagenarian Kottakkal Sivaraman. Vijayakumar lives in Kudavoor near Thiruvananthapuram.
