= Inchakkattu Ramachandran Pillai =

Indian Kathakali exponent (born 1949)

Inchakattu Ramachandran Pillai
- Born: 21 March 1949 (age 77); Sasthamkotta, Kollam district, Travancore–Cochin
- Occupation: Kathakali exponent
- Parents: Shankaran Nair (father); Chellamma (mother)
- Awards: Sangeet Natak Akademi Award (2021); Kerala Kalamandalam fellowsip (2020); Kerala Sangeetha Nataka Akademi Fellowship; Kerala Sangeetha Nataka Akademi Award (2011)

Inchakattu Ramachandran Pillai is an Indian Kathakali actor from Kerala. He received many awards and honors including the Sangeet Natak Akademi Award (2021), Kerala Kalamandalam fellowsip (2020), Kerala Sangeetha Nataka Akademi Fellowship, Kerala Sangeetha Nataka Akademi Award (2011), Kumar Gandharva Fellowship of Government of India and HRD Senior Fellowship instituted by the Ministry of Culture, Govt. of India.

== Early life ==
Ramachandran Pillai was born on 21 March 1949 to Shankaran Nair and Chellamma in Inchakattu Kothamballil house in Sasthamcotta of present-day Kollam district of Kerala. He studied at J.M.C.S. Bharanikavu School till the 7th standard and at N.R.P.M. Pullukula school till the 10th standard.

Pillai started his Kathakali studies from Keerikattu Karuta Shankara Pillai (the teacher of Mankulam Vishnu Namboothiri) and made his debut as Rukmini in Sundariswayamvaram Kathakali in the same year. After that, he joined Brahmasree Mankulam Vishnu Namboothiri's Samastha Kerala Kathakali Vidyalaya and completed his studies in 1971.

== Career and contributions ==
Pillai worked as a teacher in the Southern Kalari of Kathakali on a temporary appointment for six months in the Kerala Kalamandalam. When Margi, an institution dedicated to the revival of the art forms of Kathakali and Koodiyattam, was established in 1971, he assisted Mankulam Vishnu Namboothiri at the institute and served as the chief instructor in Kathakali, the principal of Margi, and later as a visiting professor.

Ramachandran Pillai performs all the other roles except for the female and the Chuvanna Thadi (red beard) characters. He has played different types of characters like Pacha (Green), Kathi (Kaththi), Vella Thadi (White Beard) and Minuk (radiant). Among these, his Kathi roles are the most noted. The protagonists in Kottayam stories, Nalan and Hamsa in Nalacharitham, Jarasandha in Thekkana Rajasuya, Duryodhana in Duryodhana Vadhatham, Ravana in Balivijayam and Ravanavijayam, Hanuman in Kalyanasaugandhikam, Duryodhana in Nizhalkoot, Baana in Baanayudham, Brihannala, Rukmangada, Little Narakasura, Karna, Krishna, Harishchandra, Malaya, Katala etc. are some of his best performances.

Pillai performed in various venues acreoss India and abroad including Sri Lanka, Sweden, Italy, France, Germany, Japan, Tunisia and Switzerland.

In March 2023, at a function held to honour him on receiving the Sangeet Natak Akademi Award, Pillai announced that he was planning to retire from Kathakali performances due to health issues. He also added that he intends to perform his last performance at the Subhananda Ashram in Mavelikkara on 23 April 2023 and that he plans to remain at the ashram and lead a monastic life thereafter.

== Awards and honors ==
In 2012 May, Pillai received the Kerala Sangeetha Nataka Akademi Award for 2011 for Kathakali. In 2020, he received the Kerala Kalamandalam fellowsip. In 2021, he received the Sangeet Natak Akademi Award by the government of India. He received many other awards and fellowships including the Kerala Sangeetha Nataka Akademi Fellowship, Kumar Gandharva Fellowship of Government of India, HRD Senior Fellowship instituted by the Ministry of Culture, Govt. of India.
