= Kottakkal Sivaraman =

Kathakali dancer

Kottakkal Sivaraman

Kottakkal Sivaraman (9 Jan 1936 – 19 July 2010) was a performing artiste who revolutionised the portrayal of female roles in Kathakali, the classical dance-drama from Kerala in southern India.

== Career ==
Kathakali, being a largely masculine dance form with an all-male presence (at least till the end of the first half of the 20th century), tended to give female roles a secondary status. This is despite some of its classical stories having dense and slow-paced songs (padams) set for female characters like Lalitha (in Kirmeeravadham, Bakavadham) or Urvashi (in Kalakeyavadham) besides characters like Damayanti (Nalacharitam) or Mohini (Rugmangadacharitam) or Sairandhri (or Malini in Keechakavadham) which demanded fertile imagination and an insight about their profile for brighter enactment.

The 1936-born Sivaraman, a disciple of his uncle-guru Padma Shri Vazhenkada Kunchu Nair at the PSV Natyasangham in Kottakkal in north-central Kerala's Malappuram district, decided to change all this subordination. By the 1960s, he had experimented those ideas on stage with success, much to the appreciation of aesthetes not only in his native Valluvanad, an erstwhile central-Kerala fiefdom which has been the homestead for the refined Kalluvazhi style of Kathakali, but across Kerala and subsequently the rest of the world. His Karalmanna village, north of Cherpulassery, in Palakkad district thus further affixed its name on the Kathakali map.

Over the years, Sivaraman has acted with actors of several generations across north and south Kerala, but it was with Kalamandalam Gopi that he teamed up well to gain repute as a phenomenal pair on the Kathakali stage. Together they acted, with Sivaraman as Damayanti and Gopi as Nalan, as Kunti-Karnan, as Mohini-Rukmangadan. Sivaraman's portrayal of Sairandhri (Draupadi in disguise as a maid) in Keechakavadham opposite Padma Bhushan Kalamandalam Ramankutty Nair (as Keechaka) also earned him many stages and fame. Sivaraman was one among the rare leading Kathakali artistes of modern times to have not taught in any leading performing-art institutions.

In the evening of his life, Sivaraman also carved a cast in male roles, where the magic of make-up would help him hide his advancing age. He continued to do female roles, but was also seen performing as Krishna (Kuchelavrittam) or Pushkara (Nalacharitam). He had choreographed a new storyplay (aattakkatha), Pingala, which is based on the 11th canto of the epic Bhagavatham. In its inaugural show, he enacted the lead role of the protagonist.

== Other activities and personal life ==
An artiste with keen interest in reading books, ranging from the Puranas to the latest works in his native Malayalam literature, Sivaraman was known as a garrulous talker even while being a deep-sighted thinker of his art form. Filmmaker M.R. Rajan has made a documentary on the master. The work, Minukku, went on to bag a national award in 2007.

Sivaraman received the Kerala Sangeetha Nataka Akademi Award in 1996 and the Kerala Sangeetha Nataka Akademi Fellowship in 2008. Sivaraman won the Central Sangeet Natak Akademi award. He was married and lived in Karalmanna.

== Death ==
He died at his home at 10:30 PM on 19 July 2010, aged 74.
