= Sadanam P. V. Balakrishnan =

Indian Kathakali dancer (born 1944)

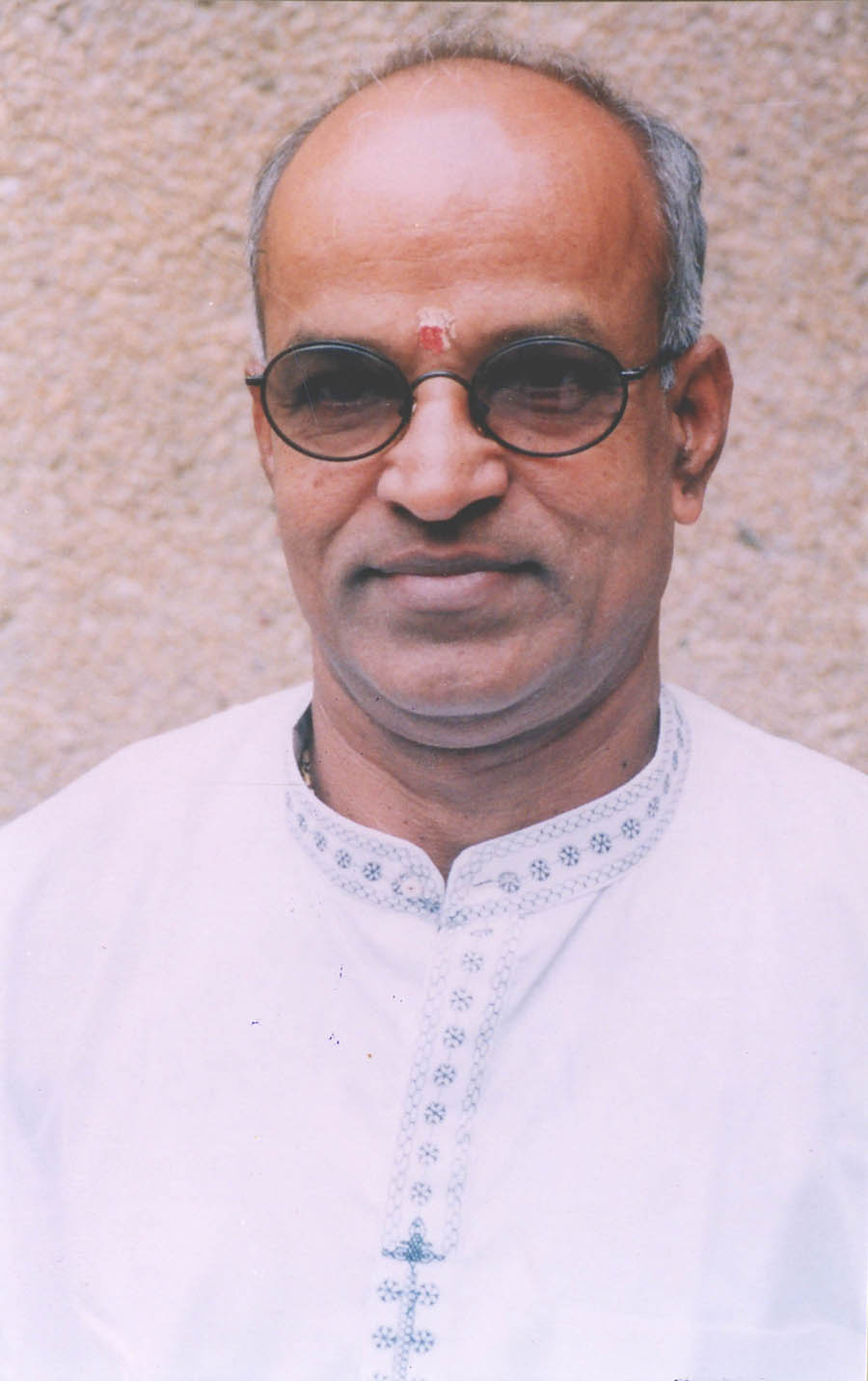
- Sadanam P. V. Balakrishnan
- Born: 1944 (age 81–82); Taliparamba, Malabar district, British India
- Occupation: Kathakali exponent
- Parent(s): A. V. Krishnan, Umayamma
- Awards: Sangeet Natak Akademi Award (2003); Padma Shri (2024); Kerala state Kathakali award (2020); Kerala Kalamandalam fellowship (2017); Kerala Kalamandalam Award (2007)

Sadanam Puthiya Veettil Balakrishnan popularly known as Sadanam Balakrishnan is an exponent of Kathakali, a form of Indian classical dance, from Kerala, India. He has received several notable awards, including the Sangeet Natak Akademi Award in 2003, Kerala state Kathakali award in 2020, and Kerala Kalamandalam fellowship in 2017. Balakrishnan taught Kathakali at the International Center for Kathakali in Delhi from 1974 to 2006 and became the Principal of Perur Gandhi Seva Sadanam in 1980. He has written four books. In 2024, he received Padma Shri the fourth-highest civilian award of the Republic of India.

== Biography ==
Puthiya Veettil Balakrishnan was born in 1944 in Taliparamba, Kannur district to A. V. Krishnan and Umayamma. His Kathakali training began at the age of eleven, when he was a seventh-grade student at Kurumathur School. His first teacher was Kondiveetil Narayanan Nair.

Kurumathur Narayanan Namboothiripad, the manager of the school where he studied and the landlord of his native place, played a major role in encouraging and nurturing him from the very beginning. From the age of 12, Narayanan Namboothiripad arranged his accommodation at his own house, along with food, and facilities for Kathakali training. Even the dakshina given to the Guru for his debut was given by Namboodiripad. It was Namboodiripad who later forced him to send in applications for admission to the Perur Gandhi Seva Sadan Kathakali School and Kerala Kalamandalam and ensured the expenses for him to attend the interviews.

Although he passed the interview at Kalamandalam, he decided to study at Sadanam since he had been admitted to the institution the day before. He underwent intensive training for 10 years at the Gandhi Seva Sadan Kathakali Academy under Thekkinkattil Ravunni Nair and Keezhpadam Kumaran Nair, with a Central Government Scholarship.

=== Personal life ===
Balakrishnan is married to Janaki. They have two son, Prasad and Pradeep. A native of Kannur, he now lives in Kochi with his son.

== Career ==
Balakrishnan is specialized in the Kalluvazhi style of Kathakali performance. He has worked as an artist and teacher at institutions like Parassinikkadavu Muthappan Kathakali Yogam, Gandhi Seva Sadan Kathakali Academy, Perur.

Balakrishnan has adapted stories from many languages, including Greek, English, French, Hindi, and Tamil, into Aattakatha form and performed according to that. He has done Aattakatha adaptation of French writer Pierre Corneille's famous tragic play Le Cid, under the title 'Maharathi', and performed as Kathakali. Psyché, written by Corneille and Molière, was adapted and presented under the title 'Sumana'. He has also adapted and performed William Shakespeare's 'Othello' and 'Macbeth' as well as Euripides' Greek plays 'Alcistes' and 'Helen'.

He has collaborated with the organization SPIC MACAY for over forty years in conducting Kathakali and lecture demonstrations across India and abroad, and has worked for many years for the promotion and promotion of Kathakali through central government institutions such as CCRT and ICCR.

Balakrishnan joined as a teacher in Kathakali at the International Center for Kathakali in Delhi in 1974, took charge as its Principal and Chief Artiste in 1980 and retired in 2006. After the retirement of Keezpadam Kumaran Nair in 1980, he became the Principal of Perur Gandhi Seva Sadanam. He proved his mettle in all disciplines of Kathakali including acting, choreography, direction and teaching.

== Books written ==
Balakrishnan has also written four books. Among the published books, Kathakali (Balakrishnan, Sadanam (2004). Kathakali. Wisdom Tree. ISBN 978-81-86685-13-6.) is part of a series on the six classical Indian dances, published by Wisdom Tree and another Kathakali: A Practitioner’s Perspective was published by Poorna Publications. Two books are about to publish soon. One is a compilation of 14 Aattakatha texts and other is about his Guru Keezhpadam Kumaran Nair.

== Awards and honors ==
- Sangeet Natak Akademi Award 2003
- Kerala state Kathakali award 2020
- Kerala Kalamandalam fellowship 2017
- Kerala Kalamandalam Award 2007
- Natyarathanam Kannan Pattali Kathakali Trust's Natyacharya Award 2021
- Swathi Thirunal Nadalaya Award 1986
- Mookambika Kathakali Vidyalaya Award 2003
- Natana Bhaskara Award 2003 from Bharata Kalanjali and Bhaskara
- 2006 "Guru Pattikamthodi Smaraka Puraskara" from Gandhi Seva Sadanam Kathakali Academy
- Natyakalaratnam and Gold Medal from Mattannur Mahadeva Kshetram & Mattannur Pancha Vadya Sangham 2007
- "Guru Sree" Award from Kaladarpan 2008
- Kalamandalam Krishnan Kutty Poduval Smaraka Award 2009
- Dr. K.N.Pisharody Smaraka Award 2010 from K.N. Pisharody Smaraka Kathakali Club
- "Nritya Sagaram Award" 2015 from Cleveland Bhairavi Finance Society
- First International Center for Kathakali Award 2015
- Gold Medal in the event Mudralaya in London 1990
- Padma Shri in arts in 2024
