= Karalmanna =

Karalmanna karalmanna
- village
- Nickname: kalayude kalavara
- Location in Kerala, India Karalmanna (India)
- Coordinates: 10°54′0″N 76°18′0″E
- Country: India
- State: Kerala
- District: Palakkad

Languages
  - Official: Malayalam, English
- Time zone: UTC+5:30 (IST)
- PIN: 679506
- Telephone code: 04662
- Vehicle registration: KL- 51
- Nearest city: Cherpulassery
- Lok Sabha constituency: [Palakkad]

Karalmanna is a south Indian village in the erstwhile state of Valluvanad along the banks of the Thootha, a tributary of the river Nila in Palakkad district of Kerala. It is connected to the nearby small towns of Cherpulassery and Perintalmanna (in Malappuram district) by road.

== Kathakali dance ==
Karalmanna has given birth to several Kathakali artists, in earlier times they were supported by the ten art-patronising Namboodiri Manas (mansions of the upper-caste Namboodiri community).

== Festivals ==
The Shiva temple hosts the Kathakali nights that are conducted as part of its annual ulsavam (festival). Late Kottakkal Sivaraman, celebrated for his female Kathakali roles, was a native and resident of this place. Karalamanna was also the birthplace of actor-dancer Thekkinkattil Ramunni Nair, a disciple of Pattikkamthodi Ravunni Menon who rescripted the grammar of the Kalluvazhi style of Kathakali and refined its aesthetics. Among the Kathakali artistes of today from Karalmanna are Narippatta Narayanan Namboodiri and Sadanam Bhasi, besides Narippatta Raju, more known for his expertise in Modern theatre world stages. He was former professor in National school of Drama ( NSD) Trichur. Karalmanna hosts several seminars and workshops on Kathakali and allied classical arts, thanks largely to the local cultural forum called Vazhenkada Kunchu Nair Memorial Trust. It has of late raised an auditorium (close to the Grameena Vayanasala or the village library) that has been venue for cultural festivals like the Kathakali Samaroham, episodes of which are still being telecast by leading Malayalam television channels Asianet and People TV on a daily basis.

== Celebrities ==
Karalmanna was the native village of the late artist Athippatta Sivaraman Nair, simply known as A.S. Nair or A.S., whose illustrations in the Mathrubhumi azchchappathippu, a reputed Malayalam weekly, during the 1980s and 1990s won him wide acclaim.

== Thirumullappulli Mahadeva Temple ==
The Thirumullappulli Siva temple of Karalmanna is quite unique in that its prathishta has but few parallels anywhere around. He is Aghora Siva, the fierce Lord sitting pre-occupied and hell-bent on avenging Daksha and worshipped in His Roudra bhava, in a posture that is awe-inspiringly ascetic. To the devotees of Karalmanna, Lord Siva of Thirumullappulli is both a protector and benefactor. He is their sole prop, a dependable deity in times of all their hardship and misery. They would willingly attribute the causes of their sufferings to the aghora aspect of the Lord of Thirumullappully, if not as the direct outcome of his curses, evidently as result of their inability to win over his other milder attributes like the Valsalya Bhava, which is the object of adoration in some other Mahadeva temples of Kerala. The most significant festival in Thirumullapulli is the Yearly Temple Festival which commences exactly eight days before the Thiruvathira Nakshathtra Varam in the Kumbha masa. The Pallivetta, the ritualistic royal hunt of the Lord to drive off the evil spirits, was originally conducted on the seventh day of the festival under the huge peepul tree that once stood in the east nada of the temple. This is now being conducted under the peepul near the Moorkkath temple. The festival culminates with the Aarattu, the holy bath of the Lord for purification at the Holy Ghat of Perandamanna kadavu of Thootha Puzha, where it suddenly changes its usual south–north course to westward.

== Festivals ==
- Iyyappan Villaku (Karalmanna Temple - 22/11/08, 19/11/10)
- Thoothakil pooram (may11/12-05-2018)
- Makara Choova
- Arrattu (Karalmanna Shivashetram - 16/02/2008) Seven days' Programme
- Kali kadavu (Bhagavathi Pratistha) - 15/3/2008
- Puthanakavu pakal puram (cherpalacherry - 11/02/2009)
- Kalavela (Cherpalacherry -12/02/2009)

== Nearest places ==
- Cherpulassery- 3 km from East
- Thootha - 3 km from West
- Perintalmanna- 17 km from West
- Coimbatore - 102 km from East
- Ottapalam - 21 km from North
- Vellinezhi - 9 km from East
- Anamangadu - 6 km from West

== Bank ==
- The Cherpalacherry Co-operative Bank, Karalmana Branch
