= Mankulam Vishnu Namboothiri =

Indian Kathakali exponent (1910–1981)

- Born: 1910
- Died: 19 April 1981 (aged 70–71)
- Occupation: Kathakali exponent
- Awards: Sangeet Natak Akademi Award (1970)

Mankulam Vishnu Namboothiri (1910 (Note: Sources differ on Mankulam Vishnu Namboothiri's year of birth. The official Sangeet Natak Akademi biography and some other reliable sources like Mathrubhumi give 1910, while a published source (Parichayam (in Malayalam). 1967.) write his birthday as Malayalam calendar date 1084 Karkkidakam 7, which is exactly 1909 July 22 and the official Margi website ("Maestros".) gives 1900. The exact year therefore remains uncertain.)–1981) was an Indian Kathakali performer known in southern style of Kathakali. He received the Sangeet Natak Akademi Award from government of India in 1970.

== Biography ==
Vishnu Namboodiri was born in 1910 in Mankulam illam (house) in Keerikadu. He trained in Kathakali under Keerikad Shankara Pillai, Velupillai, Kurichi Kunjan Panicker and Thottam Shankaran Namboothiri.

Vishnu Namboothiri died on April 19, 1981. It is said that he died in 1981, shortly after taking off the crown on his head in his Kathakali costume, after portraying the role of Krishna in four chapters. Mankulam Krishnan Namboothiri, a noted Chenda artist, former principal of Alappuzha SD College, and scientific researcher, is his son.

== Career ==
Namboothiri, who has played many characters in Kathakali, including the main Pacha roles like Nala, Karna, Kacha, and Rukmangada, as well as the main Kathi roles of Keechaka and Ravana, and the minor roles of Minukku, is most notable for his performance as Krishna. He has performed the role of Krishna costume at over a thousand venues.

Vishnu Namboodiri has performed in several parts of India and in foreign countries like Sreelanka, Singapore and US. He has also worked extensively for the revival of the southern style in Kathakali.

Also a teacher in Kathakali, Vishnu Namboothiri is also the founder of the Samastha Kerala Kathakali Vidyalaya in his home village, which later became the 'Margi' institute in Thiruvananthapuram. Vellampady Neelakandan Namboothiri, Pandalam Keralavarma, Chirakkal Madhavankutty, Inchakkattu Ramachandran Pillai, and Chavara Parukutty Amma are his noted disciples. He has also contributed Kathakali to some documentary and feature films.

== Awards and honors ==
Mankulam Vishnu Namboothiri received the Sangeet Natak Akademi Award from government of India in 1970. He has also won the President's National Award, a gold medal from then Prime Minister Jawaharlal Nehru, the Kala Ratnam Award from the Travancore Devaswom Board, and the Veerashringhala from Vazhengada.
