= Santhanagopalam (Kathakali) =

Santhanagopalam is an Aattakatha (Kathakali play) authored by Mandavappalli Ittirarissa Menon. It narrates how Krishna destroyed Arjuna's pride. During a visit to Krishna, Arjuna meets a Brahmin who has lost nine children, and has come to seek the help of Krishna. However, Krishna cold shoulders him. Arjuna vows to protect the next child of the Brahmin, failing which he would take his own life. However, Arjuna is unable to save the tenth child as well. However, Krishna intervenes and restores all the ten children to the Brahmin.
