= Banayudham =

Banayudham (Bana's Battle) is an Aattakatha (Kathakali play) written by Balakavi Rama Shasthri. It used to be a popular play in the southern (thekkan) style of Kathakali. The Asura king Bana, son of Mahabali, has a thousand arms. His daughter Usha falls in love with Aniruddha, the grandson of Krishna. Bana discovers them together and imprisons Aniruddha. Krishna challenges Bana to a battle, in which he defeats Bana by chopping off all but four of his arms. An excerpt from the play, depicting scenes involving Usha and her friend Chitralekha, is often presented independently.
