= Thonnakkal =

Thonnakkal തോണ്ണക്കൽ
- village
- Country: India
- State: Kerala
- District: Thiruvananthapuram
- Named for: Sports like Kho-Kho and volleyball
- Talukas: Thiruvananthapuram

Government
  - Body: Gram panchayat

Languages
  - Official: Malayalam, English
- Time zone: UTC+5:30 (IST)
- PIN: 695317 - Thonnakkal,695313 - Kudavoor, Manjamala
- Telephone code: +91 471
- Vehicle registration: KL-22
- Nearest city: Thiruvananthapuram and Attingal

Thonnakkal is a Northern village in Thiruvananthapuram Taluk in Kerala, India. It is located on the National Highway 66, on the way to Kollam from the state's capital. It is located about 25 km from the state's capital Thiruvananthapuram.

Mahakavi Kumaranasan, a major poet of Malayalam literature lived in Thonnakkal for long time and his major literary contributions came while he was staying in Thonnakkal. The birthplace of the late Mahakavi Kumaranasan, is near Kayikkara in Thiruvananthapuram district. The house of Kumaranasan is now converted into a tourist spot named Kumaranasan Smarakom.

The town has also given birth to Kathakali artists like Thonnakkal Peethambaran and Margi Vijayakumar. Thonnakkal is also well known for sports such as Volleyball and Kho Kho.
