= Vasu Pisharody =

Indian Kathakali actor (1943–2022)

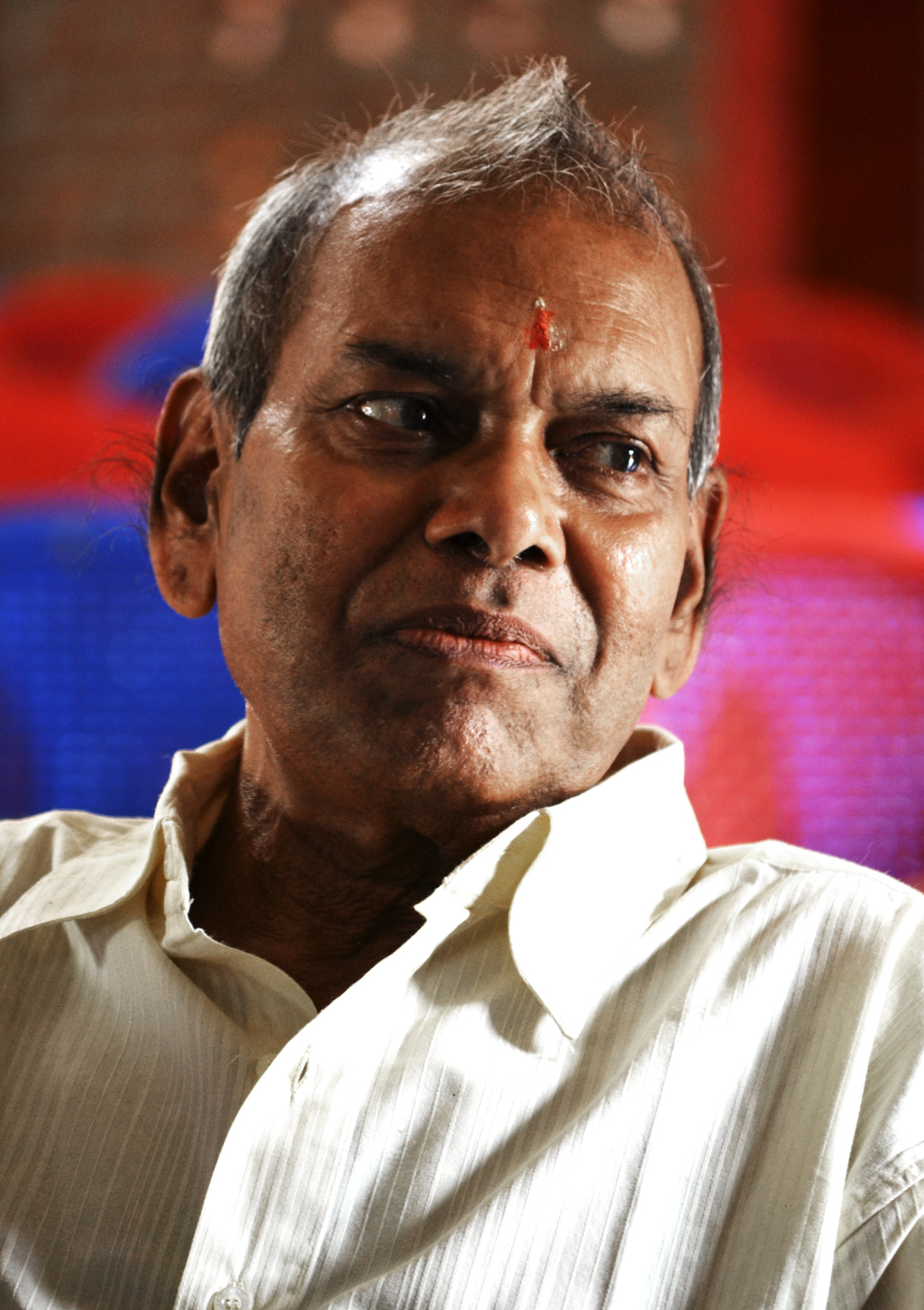
Kalamandalam Vasu Pisharody

Kalamandalam Vasu Pisharody (15 August 1943 – 1 December 2022) was an Indian Kathakali actor known for his classical dance-drama of Kerala. A frontline disciple of Padma Shri Vazhenkada Kunchu Nair, he excelled in virtuous pachcha, anti-hero Kathi and the semi-realistic minukku roles alike. Nalan, Bahukan, Arjunan, Bhiman, Dharmaputrar, Rugmangadan, Narakaasuran, Ravanan, Parashuraman and Brahmanan were his masterpieces. Vasu Pisharody performed Kathakali all over India and visited foreign countries about 20 times.

== Life and career ==
Vasu Pisharody was born at Kongad in the Palakkad district, on 15 August 1943. His primary education is up to 7th. After schooling, he had his primary Kathakali lessons under Balakrishnan Nair at Kerala Kalalayam in Ottapalam. He learned Kathakali after his 7th in Kerala Kalalayam, for one year. He subsequently joined PSV Natyasangham in Kottakkal, was a student there for three years, and later in Kerala Kalamandalam, where he undertook further studies for seven years—both under Padmasree Vazhenkada Kunchu Nair. Vasu Pisharody also had his higher studies under Padma Bhushan Kalamandalam Ramankutty Nair and Kalamandalam Padmanabhan Nair.

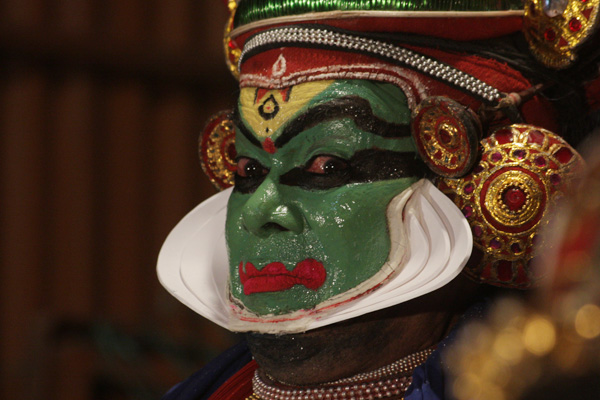
Kalamandalam Vasu Pisharody

After an initial brief stint at Kerala Kalamandalam, he continued his education for two years there with the Scholarship of Central Govt. He finished his studies in 1969, After that Vasu Pisharody worked at a kalari (Kathakali classroom) run by the Guruvayur Kathakali Club in a Temporary post till 1979. He rejoined Kalamandalam in 1979 and worked there for two decades before retiring as its vice-principal of Kathakali Vesham in 1999.

Pisharody died from heart disease at his house in Kongad, on 1 December 2022, at the age of 79.

== Awards ==
Vasu Pisharody is a winner of the Central Sangeet Natak Akademi award.

- Veerashrinkhala from Kongad.
- Awards from several Kathakali clubs.
- Kerala Kalamandalam Award in 1998.
- Kerala Sangeetha Nataka Akademi Fellowship in 2020
- Kerala Sangeetha Nataka Akademi Award in 2003
- Fellowship from Central Human Resources Development Ministry.
- Kerala Kalamandalam Fellowship.
- Shri Pattikkamthodi Puraskar - Kerala Kalamandalam.
- Shri Pattikkamthodi Puraskar - Gandhi Seva Sadan.
- Olappamanna Devi Puraskar.
- Kalamandalam Krishnan Kutty Podhuval Puraskar.
- Kalamandalam Krishnan Nair Kalyanikkuty Amma Puraskar.
- Puraskar from "Sarggam" Kongad.

== Later years ==
An ailment forced him to take a break from Kathakali in 2005, but his health improved again. He made a comeback to the stage by the end of March 2009 at the Thirumandhamkunnu temple in his village of Kongad.
