= A. S. Nair =

Indian artist

Athippatta Sivaraman Nair (c. 1930 – 30 June 1988), better known as A. S. Nair or simply A. S., was a painter, illustrator and cartoonist from Kerala, India. He was born in Karalmanna village of Palakkad district and had his training from Madras School of Arts.

He began his career in Jayakerala and Mathrubhumi, where he worked till his last. Most of Nair's works were original illustrations for novels and short stories, most of them published in Mathrubhumi weekly. Illustrations for the Malayalam translation of V. S. Khandekar's Marathi novel Yayati was one of his most noted works. He was known to be the master of illustration in Kerala and has 115 original works, including illustrations and a few paintings to his credit. He died on 30 June 1988, aged 57.

Chitrangal A.S. (Current Books), edited by R. J. Prasad, collects Nair's writings, illustrations and covers.
