= Kalakeyavadham =

Kalakeyavadham (The Slaying of Kalakeya) is a Kathakali play (Aattakatha) written by Kottayam Thampuran (also known as Kottayathu Thampuran) in Malayalam.Based on the Mahabharatha, the play describes the events surrounding the Pandava prince Arjuna's visit to his father Indra's abode, paradise. The role of Arjuna is considered a challenge for any Kathakali actor. The four plays of Kottayam Thampuran, namely, Kirmeeravadham, Bakavadham, Kalyanasaugandhikam and Kalakeyavadham, are considered very important in the Kathakali repertoire and are a combination of conventional structure ('chitta') with intermittent possibilities for improvisation ('manodharma').

Nivathakavacha Kalakeyavadham aka Kalakeyavadham Kathakali Day 1 held at Mridangasyleshwari Temple, Muzhakkunnu
