= Vanaprastham =

1999 Indo-French drama film by Shaji N. Karun

- DVD cover
- Directed by: Shaji N. Karun
- Screenplay by: Shaji N. Karun; Raghunath Paleri
- Dialogues by: Raghunath Paleri
- Story by: Pierre Assouline
- Produced by: Pierre Assouline; Mohanlal (co-producer)
- Starring: Mohanlal; Suhasini Maniratnam
- Cinematography: Renato Berta; Santosh Sivan
- Edited by: A. Sreekar Prasad; Joseph Guinvarch
- Music by: Zakir Hussain
- Production companies: Euro American Films; Pranavam Arts; CLT-UFA International (in association with)
- Distributed by: SND Films (France); Pranavam Arts (Kerala)
- Release dates: 21 May 1999 (Cannes); 25 December 1999 (India)
- Running time: 119 minutes
- Countries: France; India
- Language: Malayalam
- Budget: ₹3.8 crore (US$450,000)

Vanaprastham: The Last Dance (French: Vanaprastham: La Dernière Danse) is a 1999 Malayalam psychological drama period film by Shaji N. Karun. It was produced as an Indo-French collaboration by Pierre Assouline, and co-produced by Mohanlal. The screenplay was written by Karun and Raghunath Paleri (who also wrote the dialogues) based on a story by Assouline. It features Mohanlal in the lead role, with Suhasini Maniratnam, Mattannur Sankarankutty Marar, Kalamandalam Gopi, Venmani Haridas, and Cuckoo Parameswaran in supporting roles. The film's music was composed by Zakir Hussain.

The film premiered at the 1999 Cannes Film Festival on 21 May 1999, where it was selected in the Un Certain Regard section, and was theatrically released in France on 13 October 1999 and in India in January 2000. The film was nominated for the Grand Jury Prize at the American Film Institute's 1999 AFI Fest (Los Angeles International Film Festival). It won the Special Prize of the Jury at the Istanbul International Film Festival and the FIPRESCI prize at the Mumbai International Film Festival. The film won three awards at the 47th National Film Awards —Best Feature Film, Best Actor (Mohanlal), and Best Editing (A. Sreekar Prasad), and six awards at the 1999 Kerala State Film Awards, including Best Director and Best Actor (Mohanlal). In 2014, Vanaprastham was screened retrospective at the 45th International Film Festival of India in the Celebrating Dance in Indian cinema section.

== Plot ==
The story revolves around a male Kathakali artiste Kunjikuttan, an admirable and respected performer but a member of a lower caste. He struggles to come to terms with the rejection and estrangement of his father, a member of an upper caste who denies his paternity. Poor, unhappy, and stuck in an arranged marriage that provides no respite, he gets by for the sake of his daughter.

One night, whilst performing as Putana from Poothanamoksham from the epic Mahabharata on stage, his performance is witnessed by Subhadra, an educated and married upper-caste woman, niece of the Dewan and an aspiring composer. Impressed by his performance she invites him to play Arjuna in her adaptation of Subhadraharanam. Defying norms of India's rigid caste system, the two have an affair which results in the birth of a son.

It soon becomes clear that Subhadra loves the character Arjuna from his stage performances, and not Kunhikuttan the artiste. More in love with the valiant, noble hero of the Mahabharata, than the lower-caste dancer Kunhikuttan, she rejects him and refuses to let him see their son.

Denied access to his son, and rejected by his father, Kunhikuttan returns to the stage, leaving behind his hero roles to play demonic characters, reaching within the dark corners of his mind, becoming increasingly resentful and full of anger, until one last dance which brings the feature to a stunning end.

== Cast ==
- Mohanlal as Kunjikuttan
- Suhasini Mani Ratnam as Subhadra
- Mattannur Sankarankutty Marar as Raman
- Cuckoo Parameswaran as Savithri
- Venmani Haridas as Vasu Namboothiri
- Kalamandalam Gopi as Kunju Nair
- Venmani Vishnu as Pisharadi
- Kalamandalam Kesavan as Thirumeni
- Bindu Panicker as Bhageerathi
- Sindhu Shyam
- Dr.Sadanam Arun Babu as Child Kunji kuttan
- Shadhiya Ameer as Kunjikuttan's Daughter

== Release ==
The film premiered at the 1999 Cannes Film Festival on 21 May 1999, where it was selected in the Un Certain Regard section. In 2014, the film was screened retrospective during the 45th International Film Festival of India in the Celebrating Dance in Indian cinema section.

Writing for Variety, film critic Emanuel Levy said that "The Last Dance, which marks noted Indian cinematographer-director Shaji Karun's third appearance in Cannes, is an elaborately produced, exceedingly handsome period film about the art form of Kathakali, which combines dance, pantomime and theater [...] Through his meticulous mise-en-scene and well-crafted production, director Karun offers poignant commentary on the political and mythic role of artists in a rapidly changing society, and the fine line between the characters they play onstage and off".

Prem Panickar of Rediff wrote, "From a viewer's point of view, it is interesting that after watching the film, you come away talking of the passionate 'virtual love story', of the stunning visuals, of Mohanlal's brilliance and Suhasini's surcharged performance -- but rarely, if ever, of the director. Perhaps that is Shaji N Karun's biggest victory. He is there, in the meticulously etched story and the sparse, telling dialogues. He is there in the use of Kathakali as a medium -- inspired, perhaps, by his mentor, the late Malayalam auteur Aravindan's 1988 opus, Marattam."

== Awards ==
The film has been nominated for the following awards since its release:

Cannes Film Festival

- Competed at the Un Certain Regard section

National Film Awards

- Best Feature Film - Pierre Assouline, Mohanlal (producers)
- Best Actor - Mohanlal
- Best Editing - A. Sreekar Prasad, Joseph Guinvarch

Kerala State Film Awards

- Best Actor - Mohanlal
- Best Director - Shaji N. Karun
- Best Editor - A. Sreekar Prasad, Joseph Guinvarch
- Best Sound Recordist - A. S. Laxmi Narayanan, Bruno Tarrière
- Best Processing Lab - Prasad Colour Lab
- Best Make-up Artist - M. O. Devasya, Saleem

Kerala Film Critics Association Awards

- Best Film - Shaji N. Karun (director)
- Best Director - Shaji N. Karun
- Best Actor - Mohanlal
- Best Sound Recordist - A. S. Laxmi Narayanan

Filmfare Awards South

- Best Actor – Malayalam - Mohanlal
- Best Cinematographer – South - Santosh Sivan

Other awards

- Won Mathrubhumi Film Award for Best Actor - Mohanlal
- Won FIPRESCI prize at the Mumbai International Film Festival - Shaji N. Karun
- Won Special Prize of the Jury at Istanbul International Film Festival - Shaji N. Karun
- Nominated for Grand Jury Prize at American Film Institute Festival - Shaji N. Karun

== Soundtrack ==
The music for the film was composed by Zakir Hussain. The soundtrack album was distributed by Universal Music France, it was released on 1 October 1999 in Europe.

== Legacy ==
Vanaprastham was the first Indian film shot with Panavision cameras and lenses. Mohanlal's performance in the film is often regarded by critics as one of the best performances in his career. Vanaprastham was Karun's third directorial after Piravi (1989) and Swaham (1994) and it was the third time his film getting selection at the Cannes Film Festival. After the screening of the film, the Government of France conferred him with the title Ordre des Arts et des Lettres (Chevalier); Karun responded that "I think they gave me the award because all three of my films were premiered at Cannes - a very rare honour". Impressed with his work in Vanaprastham, A. Sreekar Prasad was hired by Mani Ratnam for editing Alaipayuthey (their first collaboration), who later becomes his regular editor. In 2005, Mohanlal listed Vanaprastham in his list of top ten best Indian films of all time. In 2013, in an online poll conducted by CNN-IBN on their website as part of the 100 years celebration of Indian cinema, Vanaprastham came ninth in the poll for finding the "greatest Indian film ever". In 2016, on the occasion of India celebrating its 70th Independence day, news agency NDTV compiled a list called "70 Years, 70 Great Films" and Vanaprastham was among the four Malayalam films that found place in the list.
