= Balivijayam =

Balivijayam (Bali's victory) is an Aattakatha (Kathakali play) penned by Kalloor Nampoothiripadu. It tells the story of how the vanara king Bali, avenges the insult done to his father Indra. Indra had been captured by Meghanada, son of Ravana. In return, Bali ties up Ravana in the coils of his tail and humiliates him. The enactments of 'Parvathiviraham' and 'Kailasodharanam' by the actor playing Ravana, is a highlight of the play.
