= Karnasapatham =

Karnasapatham (The Oath of Karna) is an Aattakatha (Kathakali play) written by Mali Madhavan Nair. It is one of the most popular Kathakali plays, having been performed at over 5000 venues during the playwright's life time. The play centres around Karna's emotional conflict after the mother of the Pandavas, Kunti reveals that he is her firstborn.
