= Narakasuravadham =

Narakasuravadham (The Slaying of Narakasura) is an Aattakatha (Kathakali play) authored by Dharma Raja in Malayalam. Based on the Bhagavatam, it narrates the tale of the rise to power of the demon king Narakasura. Narakasura sends his servant, the demoness Nakrathundi to heaven to capture some divine damsels. Nakrathundi, in the process, gets smitten by Indra's son, Jayantha, and approaches him with amorous requests. Jayantha rejects her, and she attempts to seize him. In the ensuing confrontation, she ends up being mutilated by Jayantha. Nakrathundi rushes back to Narakasura, who is infuriated, and decides to avenge her by attacking heaven. He conquers heaven and dethrones Indra. The king of the devas then approaches Krishna, who finally defeats Narakasura.
