= Milena Salvini =

Indian Kathakali dancer (1933–2022)

Milena Salvini (23 April 1933 – 25 January 2022) was an Italian-born French exponent and teacher of Indian classical dance. Especially known for her services to Kathakali, in 2019 she was awarded India's fourth highest civilian award, the Padma Shri.

== Life and career ==
Salvini was born in 1933 in Milan, Italy. Her father died when she was four years old. Her mother brought her to France, where she began learning music. She also studied modern dance, performing with the Ballets Contemporaines de Karin Waehner in Sensemaya by Sara Pardo in 1963.

In 1962, Salvini obtained a two-year scholarship to train in Kathakali at the Kerala Kalamandalam. Upon her return to France, she established a tour by the Kathakali troupe of the Kalamandalam under the auspices of UNESCO.

Salvini and Filipuzzi opened the Mandapa Centre in Paris, France, in 1975 to teach classical dance. In 1980, she arranged for the Kalamandalam's Kutiyattam troupe to travel to Europe with funding from UNESCO. In 1999, another Kutiyattam tour she organised resulted in UNESCO encouraging an application to its newly established Intangible Cultural Heritage of Humanity programme. Kutiyattam was added to the list in May 2001.

== Personal life and death ==
She married Roger Filipuzzi, an architect in 1974. Her daughter Isabelle Anna is also an Indian classical dancer, specialising in Kathak.

Salvini died in Paris on 25 January 2022 at the age of 88.

== Selected works ==
- L'histoire fabuleuse du théâtre Kathakali à travers le Ramayana. Jacqueline Renard. 1990.
- La Fabuleuse histoire du Kathakali à travers ses techniques. Riveneuve. 2017. ISBN 978-2-36013-449-6.
- Milena Salvini, Roger Filipuzzi (producers), Jacques Oger (director). L’Epopée du Mahabharata, théâtre dansé Kathakali (film) (in French).
- Milena Salvini, Roger Filipuzzi (producers) (1994). Kutiyattam: le plus vieux théâtre-dansé du monde (film) (in French).
