= Uttaraswayamvaram =

Uttaraswayamvaram (Uttara's Wedding) is a Kathakali play (Aattakatha) authored by Irayimman Thampi in Malayalam. Based on the Mahabharatha, it narrates an episode from the thirteenth year of exile of the Pandava princes, during which they stay in disguise at the palace of the King of Virata. The story narrates the attempt by Thrigartha, a vassal of the Kauravas, to abduct cows from Virata's kingdom. The Pandavas step in to foil the efforts of the Kauravas, and in the process, their true identity is revealed. The play culminates in the marriage of the Princess Uttara of Virata to Abhimanyu, son of Arjuna.
