= Keechakavadham =

Keechakavadham (The Slaying of Keechaka) is a Kathakali play (Aattakatha) authored by Irayimman Thampi in Malayalam. Based on the Mahabharatha, it narrates an episode from the thirteenth year of exile of the Pandava princes, during which they stay in disguise at the palace of the King of Virata. The Queen's brother, Keechaka, takes a liking to Panchali, who is working as the Queen's handmaiden, Sairandhri. Panchali tries to reject his advances but Keechaka presses on. This culminates in Bheema, in disguise as Valala, slaying Keechaka.
