= Ravanolbhavam =

Ravanolbhavam (The Origin of Ravana) is a Kathakali play(Aattakatha) authored by Kallekulangara Raghava Pisharodi in Malayalam. Based on the Ramayana, it narrates the story surrounding the origin of Ravana and his rise to power following his penance to Brahma. A major part of the play involves the arrogant Ravana enacting the tale of how, by means of a severe penance, he came in possession of boons from Brahma.
