= Thoranayudham =

Kathakali play

Thoranayudham (The Battle at the Entrance) is a Kathakali play (Aattakatha) authored by Kottarakara Thampuran in Malayalam. Based on the Ramayana, it narrates the events surrounding Hanuman's journey to Lanka in order to locate Seetha and convey to her the message from Rama. The actors detail the journey of Hanuman to Lanka by crossing the sea, followed by his encounter with the gatekeeper Lankalakshmy. This is followed by Ravana's entrance, and his entreaties to Sita which are of no avail. Hanuman meets Sita, delivers the message from Rama, and sets out to wreak havoc in Lanka by setting it on fire.
