= Aattakatha (performance) =

Malayalam literary genre

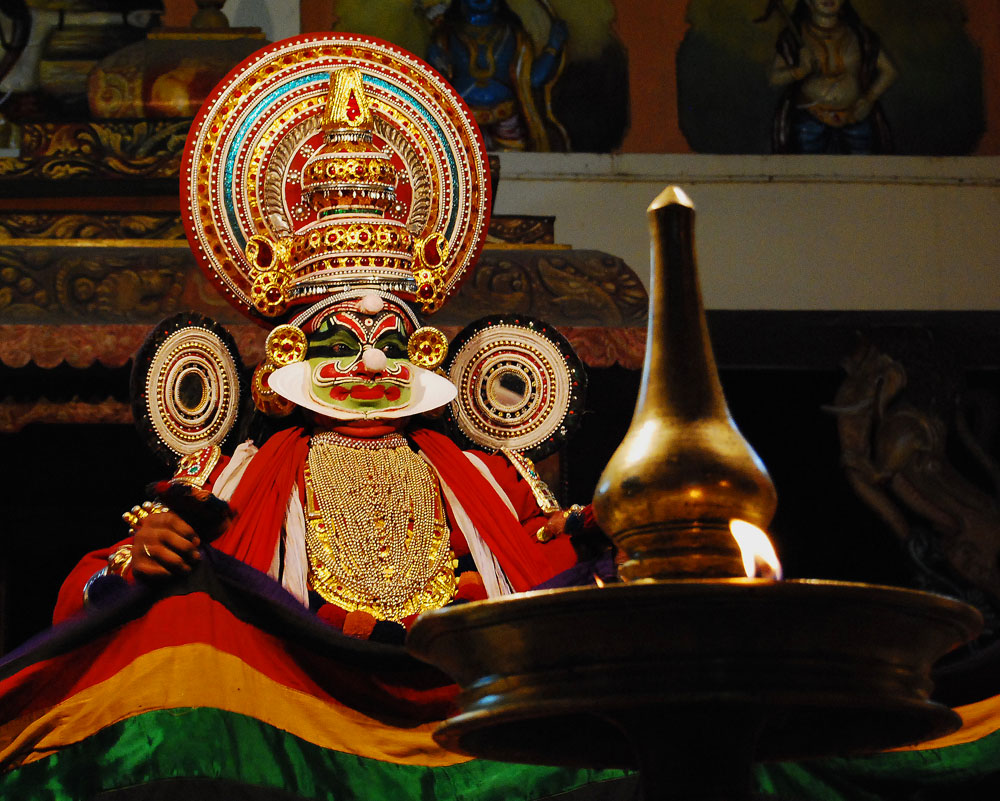
Kathakali being performed in the cultural attire

Aattakatha is a literary genre in Malayalam language consisting of the libretto used for the Indian classical dance drama kathakali. The word aatta-katha literally means "story for dancing and acting" (atu "to sway" + kathā "story"). The narrative framework of aattakatha consists quatrains in Sanskrit metres where the diction also is heavily Sanskritised; the dialogue part, however, is made up of padas, which can be set to raga (tune) and tala (rhythm) and have to be rendered by means of gestures and body movements by the actors while being sung by musicians from behind.

The origins of aattakatha literature dates back to the 12th century and it emerged as a literary genre in the 17th century. The earliest of the aattakathas is believed to be a cycle of eight Ramayana stories (collectively known as Ramanattam), composed by Kottarakkara Tampuran and about whose date there is an ongoing controversy. Next in importance are the works of Kottayathu Tampuran whose period is about the middle of the seventeenth century. Since the four aattakathas he wrote Bakavadham, Kalyanasaugandhikam, Kirmeeravadham and Kalakeyavadham punctiliously conform to the strict rules of kathakali, they are particularly favoured by orthodox artistes and their patrons. Another poet of this category is Irayimman Thampi (1783-1863). Unnayi Variyar’s Nalacharitham Aattakatha is one of the most famous works in this genre.

While Kathakali plays in their original form were designed to be performed over an entire night, over the years, they are performed in highly edited forms; often, only sections of the Aattakatha are performed, with non textual improvisations added.

== List of Attakathas ==
Over the years, a large number of Attakathas have been penned. A list of some popular attakathas is given below:

- Seethaswayamvaram
- Balivadham
- Thoranayudham
- Kirmeeravadham
- Bakavadham
- Kalyanasaugandhikam
- Kalakeyavadham
- Keechakavadham
- Uttaraswayamvaram
- Dakshayagam
- Narakasuravadham
- Poothanamoksham
- Banayudham
- Kamsavadham
- Balivijayam
- Ravanavijayam
- Ravanolbhavam
- Nalacharitham
- Rugmangadacharitham
- Santhanagopalam
- Subhadraharanam
- Ambareeshacharitham
- Karthyaveerarjunavijayam
- Kiratham
- Duryodhanavadham
- Rajasooyam
- Rugmineeswayamvaram
- Lavanasuravadham
- Karnasapatham
- Kuchelavrittam
