= Seethaswayamvaram =

Seethaswayamvaram (Seetha's Wedding) is a Kathakali play (Aattakatha) authored by Kottarakara Thampuran in Malayalam. Based on the Ramayana, it narrates the events surrounding the marriage of Rama and Seetha, and their being accosted by the sage Parasurama. The play was revived and the costume of Parasurama was redesigned by the famed Kathakali actor Kalamandalam Ramankutty Nair.
