= Pattikkamthodi Ravunni Menon =

Indian classical dancer (1880–1948)

Pattikkamthodi Ravunni Menon (1880–1948)
- Great Kathakali reformer.
- Born: Cheththalloor, British India present day Palakkad, Kerala
- Years active: 1896-1947
- Spouse: Ammukkutty Amma
- Website: www.kalapadmanabhatrust.co.in

Pattikkamthodi Ravunni Menon (1880–1948) was a pivotal figure in the history of Kathakali, having played a crucial role in remoulding and refining its grammar in the famed Kalluvazhi tradition of the classical dance-drama from Kerala in south India. He was trained in the art form at a culture-patronising Namboodiri mansion in Vellinezhi near his home.

== Early life ==
Young Ravunni, a native of Chethallur in present-day Palakkad district, was groomed in Kathakali by the Kalluvazhi Kuyilthodi Ittirarissa Menon at Olappamanna Mana with Kariyattil Koppan Nair and Malankattil Sankunni Nair as his co-students. Ittiraricha Menon's demise led to Ravunni Menon becoming the chief tutor at Olappamanna, since when he started handling lead roles (Aadyavasana vesham) on Kathakali stages. He was initially associated with the Manjeri Kaliyogam (Kathakali institution-cum-troupe).

Menon, who was till then said to be focused solely on the body movement aspect of Kathakali, acquired a major asset in his profession when he imbibed the essence of emotive acting (rasabhinaya) under Kunjunni Thampuran. It gave birth to a new chapter in the Kalluvazhi style, noted for its economy of space while moving the body, well-defined hand gestures, their clinical synchronisation with the musical beats and percussion accompaniment. This quantum improvement later helped him earn quite a few epoch-defining Kathakali disciples when he joined Kerala Kalamandalam in 1933 and worked there for a decade. Prominent among the pupils are Thekkinkattil Ravunni Nair, Vazhenkada Kunchu Nair, Kalamandalam Krishnan Nair, Keezhpadam Kumaran Nair, Kalamandalam Ramankutty Nair and Kalamandalam Padmanabhan Nair (who was also his son). He was also teacher to Mampuzha Madhava Panikkar, Kavungal Sankarankutty Panikkar, Kariyattil Kumaran, Kunhunni Nair, Guru Gopinath, Madhavan, Guru Kelu Nair, Sivaraman, Sivasankaran, Krishnan, Kattissery Raman, Balakrishnan and Krishnankutty Varrier.

== On stage ==
On the stage, Menon was celebrated for his lead roles in the four Kottayam Thampuran plays: Kalakeyavadham, Kirmeeravadham, Bakavadham and Kalyanasougandhikam. His masterpieces also included Dakshan, Nalan in Nalacharitan Randaam Divasam, Arjunan in Subhadraharanam, Cheriya Narkasuran and Ravanan in Balivijayam, Ravanolbhavam, Kartaveerarjunavijayam and Balivadham besides minukku roles like Bhrahmanan in Santanagopalam and Rukminiswayamvaram, and Durvassavu in Ambareeshacharitam. He was known to be particular for using his own set of costume paraphernalia (kalikkoppu) all the time.

Menon's notes on the aesthetics of Kathakali have been published in a book, which has also formed material for art research scholars.
