= Thekkinkattil Ravunni Nair =

Indian dancer (1888–1962)

- Born: Ravunni Nair; 1888; Tachhanattukara, Palakkad district, British India (present-day Kerala, India)
- Died: 1962 (aged 73–74); Karalmanna, Palakkad district, Kerala
- Awards: Sangeet Natak Akademi Award (1961)

Thekkinkattil Ravunni Nair also known as Thekkinkattil Ramunni Nair was a Kathakali dancer from Kerala in India. He is a recipient of Sangeet Natak Akademi Award by Sangeet Natak Akademi, Government of India.

== Biography ==
Ravunni Nair was born on 1888, in Tachhanattukara village in present-day Palakkad district of Kerala.

Ravunni Nair was the first disciple of Kathakali legend Pattikkamthodi Ravunni Menon. He trained under him for 15 years. In 1902, Ravunni Nair became a Kathakali performer in the Poomulli Mana Kaliyogam. At that time, when his guru Ravunni Menon fell ill with rheumatism, it was Ravunni Nair who helped and cared for him. He also performed for kaliyogams (troupes) of Nedumpulli Mana, Modappilappally Mana and Kumbalath Embranthiri.

Ravunni Nair died in 1962 due to age related illness, at Karalmanna, Palakkad district.

== Career ==
Portraying both Pacha (good characters) and Kathi (negative characters) roles in Kathakali, he has portrayed many female Kathakali characters, and his role as Urvashi has received widespread critical acclaim. Other than acting in Kathakali, he was also an expert in Kathakali costume making.

Started teaching at Koodallur Mana in 1947, followed by Thootha near Cherpulassery and Ankarath in Palakkad, he became a Kathakali teacher at Sadanam in 1957. Kathakali artists like Sadanam Krishnankutty, Sadanam P. V. Balakrishnan and Sadanam Ramankutty were his disciples.

Nair has also published a book on the art of Kathakali acting, named Natya rachana in 1956, which describes the rasas (face expression of emotions) in Kathakali, their nature, and the techniques of performing it.

== Awards and honors ==
- Sangeet Natak Akademi Award (1961)
