= Dakshayagam =

Dakshayagam (The Fire-Sacrifice of Daksha) is a Kathakali play (Aattakatha) authored by Irayimman Thampi in Malayalam. Based on the Skanda Purana, it narrates the story of Daksha, son of Brahma, and his daughter Sathi. Sathi marries Shiva and after the marriage, an animosity develops between Daksha and Shiva. Sathi attends, uninvited, a yajna conducted by her father. Her father humiliates her and sends her away. Sathi returns to Shiva and asks him to kill her father to avenge the insult. Then she burns herself into ashes. Shiva creates two fierce warriors Veerabhadra and Bhadrakali, who behead Daksha and throw his head in the yajna fire. However, as an act of benevolence, Shiva brings Daksha back to life, albeit with a goat's head.
