= Kirmeeravadham =

Kirmeeravadham (The Slaying of Kirmeera) is a Kathakali play (Aattakatha) written by Kottayam Thampuran (also known as Kottayathu Thampuran) in Malayalam. Based on the Mahabharatha, the story concerns itself with events in the course of the forest exile of the Pandava princes. The play has fourteen scenes. The four plays of Kottayam Thampuran, namely, Kirmeeravadham, Bakavadham, Kalyanasaugandhikam, and Kalakeyavadham, are considered very important in the Kathakali repertoire and are a combination of conventional structure (chitta) with intermittent possibilities for improvisation (manodharma).

== Brief Summary ==
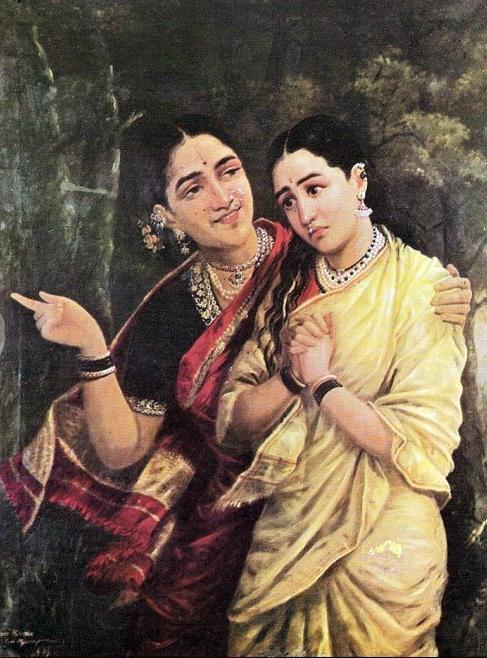
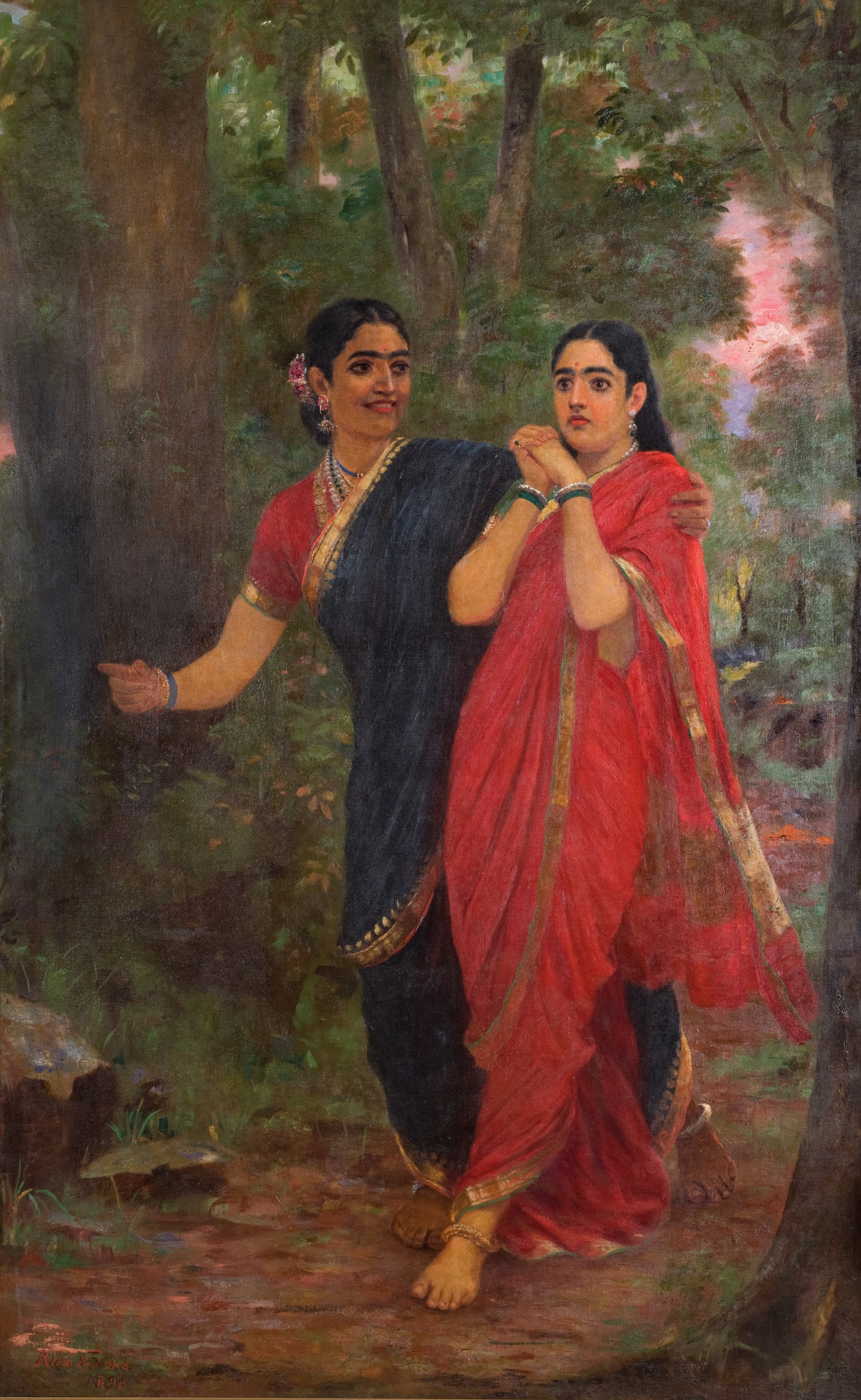
simhika disguised as beautiful woman to deceive and kill Draupadi

The five Pandava princes, along with their wife Draupadi, are in exile in the Kamyaka forest. In the first scene of the play, Draupadi and the eldest Pandava prince Dharmaputra(also known as Yudhishthira) are in distress owing to the heat and dust in the forest. They discuss the question of feeding the Brahmins who have accompanied them on their exile. In the second scene, Dharmaputra consults with the sage Dhaumya, who advises him to do penance to the Sun god(Surya). Dharmaputra acts accordingly and the Sun god appears, and grants him the Akshaya Patra, a vessel that provides, every day, an inexhaustible supply of food till Draupadi takes her food. Dharmaputra hands the vessel to Draupadi. Following this, Krishna appears on the scene, and has a conversation with Dharmaputra. Hearing of the difficulties of the Pandavas, Krishna is enraged and commands his weapon Sudarshana Chakra to appear, so that he may at once destroy the Kaurava princes, who were responsible for the exile of the Pandavas in the first place. Dharmaputra intervenes and pleads with Krishna not to do so. Krishna agrees, and leaves after blessing the Pandavas. In the third scene, the sage Durvasa appears, with his disciples. Dharmaputraa welcomes them to their abode and sends them away for their purificatory rituals before they can have a meal. The fourth scene has Draupadi lamenting about the fact that since she has had her meal for the day, the Akshaya Patra will yield no more food for the day; hence there is no way to feed the sage Durvasa and his disciples. Krishna appears again, and asks Draupadi for food. She replies that the vessel is empty. Krishna insists, and she gives him a bit of spinach that is still left over in the Akshaya Patra. Krishna eats this and at once declares that his hunger has disappeared, and by his miraculous powers causes the sages to also feel full. In the sixth scene, Durvasa returns and blesses Dharmaputra.

The seventh scene depicts the killing of the demon Shardula by the Pandava prince Arjuna. In the eighth scene, we see the wife of Shardula, the demoness Simhika, upset at the death of her husband. Taking the form of a beautiful woman, she approaches Draupadi in the ninth scene, and describes to her about a fictional temple dedicated to the Goddess Durga, and promises to take Draupadi there. In the tenth scene, Simhika assumes her terrible form, and carries away Draupadi, who cries for help. In the eleventh scene, the Pandava prince Sahadeva rushes to the aid of Draupadi, and attacks and mutilates Simhika, and rescues Draupadi. The twelfth scene has Sahadeva and Panchali filling in the other Pandavas on what transpired.

In the thirteenth scene, the mutilated Simhika rushes to her brother, the demon Kirmeera, who consoles her and rushes to attack the Pandavas. Following this he calls the Pandava prince Bhima to battle in the fourteenth scene. Bhima defeats and kills Kirmeera, following which the ascetics in the forest come and sing praises to Bhima for killing the demon.

=== Variations from the Mahabharatha ===
The characters of Shardula and Simhika are original creations of Kottayam Thampuran; they are not to be found in the Mahabharatha. In the Mahabharatha, Kirmeera(Kirmira) is a brother of Bakasura and friend of Hidimba, who attacks the Pandavas in order to exact revenge for their death at the hands of Bhima.

== Bibliography ==
- Kottayathu Thampuran (2012). Kirmeeravadham [The Killing of Kirmeera] (in Malayalam). National Book Stall Kerala.
