= Kothachira =

Human settlement in India

Kothachira is a village in central Kerala, southern India. The village is located on the borders of Thrissur and Palakkad districts and is also known as Kothara.

== Transportation ==
Kothachira is connected by road to the nearest towns of Pattambi and Kunnamkulam and has the Chirakkal Vishnu temple, Ayyappan Kavu at south Kothachira, Appatthuvalappu Devi temple, Vishnu Temple - Aathrasseri Anthyalan Kavu on Chalissery-Peringode road and a Kalari (now only the temple of which remains). It was the Family Temple of Malayanchath Kalarikkal Tharavadu, currently it is run by a public committee. There are public schools in North and South Kothachira.

Kothachira is connected to the nearest towns of Pattambi (Palakkadu) and Kunnamkulam (Trissur) by road. Kothachira is well connected to neighboring cities by bus.

== Culture ==
Kothachira has been a center of traditional performing arts—especially Kathakali, the four-century-old classical dance-drama, and Panchavadyam.

Old Illams The village has some mansions of Nampoodiri Illams, Kothara Mana being the central one. It provided a venue for several art forms—classical, ritual and folk dance. The name believed to be gained through Kotha, the collective inhabitants of dancers and musicians in the period of Chola dynasty.Chira means pond;which is situated west to the proud temple, Chirakkal Vishnu temple. The culture begins and developed around the temple. It was the Kalary of the Chirakkal Nairs before the arrival of Vengattur so called Aadyans (Aryans), who migrated from Chirakkal Rajavamsam, near Kannur, Kerala, around 400AD. (Kolathiri) Ref Athulan (Sanscrit poetic text).
