= Kalyanasaugandhikam =

Kalyanasaugandhikam is a Kathakali play (aattakatha) attributed to Kottayathu Thampuran. Based on the Mahabharatha, the play narrates an episode from the life of the Pandava princes in exile. Bheema sets out to the forest, searching for the kalyāṇasaugandhikam flower to please Panchali (Draupadi), and finds his spirit-brother Hanuman in the forest while doing so. Together with Thampuran's Kirmeeravadham, Bakavadham and Kalakeyavadham, this play is considered a hallmark in Kathakali repertoire; it is remarked for its fusion of conventional structure (ciṭṭa) and the possibility for improvisation (manōdharma).
