= Subhadraharanam =

Subhadraharanam (The Abduction of Subhadra) is a Kathakali play (Aattakatha) authored by Manthredathu Nambudiripad in Malayalam. Based on the Mahabharata, it narrates the episodes surrounding Subhadra's elopement and marriage with the Pandava prince Arjuna with the help of her brother Krishna in the absence of their older brother Balabhadra(Balarama) . The first part of the play is about the wedding of Arjuna and Subhadra, and their elopement. The second part is about Balabhadra's discovery of the wedding, and how Krishna calms him down.
