= Rukmangada =

King in Hindu mythology

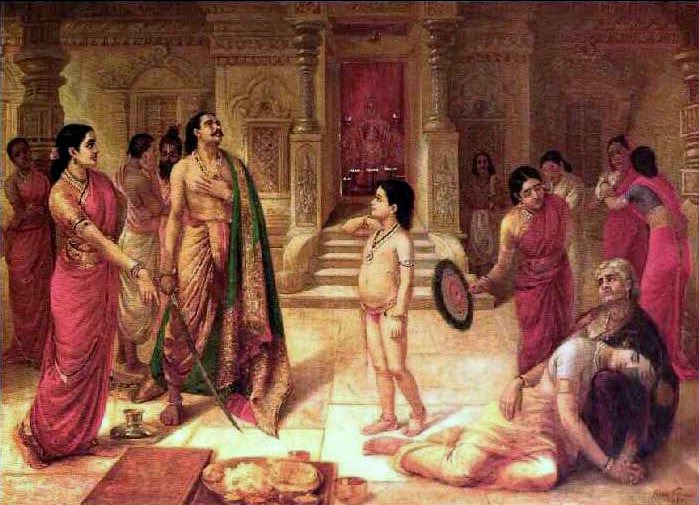
- Mohini asks Rugmangada to kill his own son, Raja Ravi Varma painting
- Texts: Mahabharata, Puranas
- Region: Vidisha

Genealogy
- Parents: Rutadhvaja (father)
- Spouse: Sandhyavali and Mohini
- Children: Dharmangada
- Dynasty: Suryavamsha

Rukmangada (Sanskrit: रुक्माङ्गद, romanized: Rukmāṅgada) is a king of the Solar dynasty featured in Hindu literature. He is the husband of Sandhyavali and later the apsara Mohini, and the father of Dharmangada. He appears in a legend where he expresses a willingness to kill his own son rather than break his observance of fasting on the day of ekadashi.

== Legend ==
In the Narada Purana, Rukmangada is stated to be the king of Vidisha. Described to be a pious king and a great devotee of Vishnu, he imposed strict laws that prohibited his able citizens from breaking their fast on the day of ekadashi, the eleventh day of a lunar fortnight that is sacred to the deity. He encouraged them to bathe in the river Ganga and offer gifts to Brahmins on this occasion. The deity Yama sought an audience with Brahma, lamenting that Rukmangada's actions resulted in the reduction of the number of people to his abode. He refused to perform his duties until the king's resolve was tested. Brahma created an apsara named Mohini and instructed her to beguile and marry Rukmangada. He ordered her to engage in efforts to break the king's observance of the ekadashi. Upon first meeting the apsara while travelling to Mount Mandara, the king was utterly bewitched by her beauty. A courtship ensued and Mohini extracted a promise from the king to the effect that she would only become his wife if he agreed to grant her every wish. Rukmangada agreed, following which they were married and journeyed to Vidisha.

For eight years, Rukmangada enjoyed his dalliance with Mohini, still observing his vow of the ekadashi. Before the occasion of the Prabodhini Ekadashi, Mohini asked her husband to not undertake his fast if he still wished to continue his relationship with her. In response, Rukmangada offered her all of his wealth, his domains, and his life itself, but insisted that he undertake the fast. Mohini reminded him of his promise to her before their wedding and recalled a conversation she had had with the sage Gautama, who had told her that it was not necessary for kings to observe the fast. She also told him that the Vedas did not mention the fast. She sought the assistance of the Brahmins to defend her views. Dharmangada asked his father to grant his step-mother whatever she desired. When the king remained resolute, Mohini grew irate with him. She approached Sandhyavali, asking her to offer her the head of her son instead for the sake of her husband's dharma. Sandhyavali persuaded the king to acquiesce to Mohini's demands rather than abandon his vow. Dharmangada consented to be slain for the sake of his father's honour. When Dharmangada was about to be beheaded by his father's sword, Vishnu intervened, taking Rukmangada, Sandhyavali, and Dharmangada away to his heavenly abode, Vaikuntha.
