= Bakavadham =

Play by Kottayam Thampuran

A performanca of Bakavadham in 2025

Bakavadham ("the slaying of Baka") is an Indian Kathakali play written by Kottayam Thampuran in the Malayalam language. Based on the Mahabharatha, the story narrates the events surrounding the escape of the Pandavas from the house of Lac, which was built by the Kauravas as a trap. They escape to a forest, where Bhima meets and marries Hidumbi. Following this, the Pandavas move to a village named Ekachakra, where they live in disguise. While in Ekachakra, Bhima slays Baka, a demon who has been terrorizing the countryside.
