= S. Easwara Varma =

- Born: 3 October 1952 (age 73)
- Origin: India
- Genre: Carnatic music
- Occupations: Violinist, Teacher
- Instrument: Violin
- Years active: 1972 to present

S. Easwara Varma is a carnatic style violinist and teacher from Kerala, South India. Shri.Varma has taught in several music colleges in Kerala for over 30 years. He is a regular performer in various music events held in the country, both as a soloist and as an accompanying artiste. Easwara Varma has accompanied with his violin many greats in Carnatic music, like T.K.Govinda Rao, V.Dakshinamoorthy Swamy, Mavelikkara Prabhakara Varma, Neyyattinkara Vasudevan, Neyyattinkara Mohanachandran, S.Retnakaran Bhagavathar, P.R.Kumara Kerala Varma, Perumbavoor.G.Raveendranath, Dr.K.J.Yesudas, T.V.Sankaranarayanan, Sanjay Subrahmanyan, T.M.Krishna, Prof.K.Omanakutty, M.K.Sankaran Namboothiri, Vayyankara.S.R.Madhusoodanan, and K.Venkataraman

== Early life ==
Easwara Varma was born on 3 October 1952 as the fourth child of Late V.Sambu Namboothiri and Ambika Thampuratty in Mavelikkara. As a young child, Shri.Varma was taught the basics of classical music by his father who was quite proficient in the carnatic style. Later, he had his formal education in violin under the able tutelage of Shri.B.Sasikumar and Shri.Chalakudy.N.S.Narayana Swamy. He had completed Ganabhooshanam and Ganapraveena (post Diploma) from Sree Swathi Thirunal College of Music, Thiruvananthapuram with distinction. He further underwent a two-year advanced training under the guidance of Shri.Chalakudy.N.S.Narayana Swamy with a Cultural Scholarship from the Government of India

== Teaching ==
In 1977 Easwara Varma joined the Chembai Memorial Government Music College, Palakkad as a tutor in violin. Later he joined in Sree Swathi Thirunal College of Music, Thiruvananthapuram where he was eventually made a professor, and retired as the Head of the Department (Violin). He had also taught at R.L.V. College of Music and Fine Arts, Thrippunithura. Outside of these institutions too, he has trained a large number of students, many of whom are celebrated artistes themselves. He had also served as a member of the Board of Studies (Music), University of Kerala from 2005 to 2008, and as an external examiner of M.A Music Examination board, Mahatma Gandhi University, Kottayam. After retiring from government service in 2008, Shri.Varma currently divides his time between nurturing violin enthusiasts and performing at various venues

== Music career ==
Easwara Varma had performed in various stages right from his school days. However, he started performing as a professional artiste only when he was around 20 years old. Since then, he has performed extensively in various Sangeetha Sabhas across the country

From 1978 onwards, he has been closely associating with the A.I.R, Thiruvananthapuram, where he had given several violin concerts and also accompanied many eminent artistes. Currently, he is an A-Grade artist of the A.I.R. He had given a violin concert in South Zone hookup Music Concerts conducted by the A.I.R, in 1989. He also performed as an accompanying artiste in Akashvani Sangeet Sammelan in 2013. From 1985 onwards, Doordarshan also has aired several of his performances

Sri Venkateswara Bhakti Channel (SVBC) had aired an episode featuring him accompanying on violin the renowned vocalist, Shri.K.Venkataraman

In 2000, Shri.Varma along with Shri.Vayyankara.S.R.Madhusoodanan (Vocal), Shri.Mavelikkara.S.R.Raju (Mridangam), Shri. Anil Kumar (Ghatam), and Shri.Neyyattinakara Krishnan (Mukharshanku), had visited USA and gave concerts in Pittsburgh, Cleveland, Texas, Virginia, New York, and Washington

== Personal life ==
Easwara Varma lives with his family in Sreekanteswaram, Thiruvananthapuram. His wife, Smt. Lalithambika Thambatty, now retired, used to teach in Bharatiya Vidya Bhavan, Thiruvananthapuram. He has two daughters - Dr. Vrinda Varma and Smt.Vidya Varma. Dr. Vrinda Varma, a Ph.D. holder in carnatic music from the University of Kerala, and an accomplished violinist, currently works as a guest lecturer of violin, in Sree Sankaracharya University of Sanskrit, Kalady. Smt.Vidya Varma is employed with Wipro, Bengaluru campus.

== Awards and honours ==
Shri.Varma had been the recipient of numerous accolades on account of his performances and teaching skills. Some of them are

- Nada Bhooshan Award by Kerala Marar Kshema Sabha in 1980
- Ponnada presented by the then Kerala Governor Sri.B.Rachaiah, for Thulasee Vana Parishath in 1990
- Madhura Gana Sudha Award by Vaikathashtami festival committee, Madhura in 2005
- Guru Puja Puraskar by Kerala Sangeetha Nataka Academy in 2009
- Raghuvara Puraskaram in 2013
- Lalithamma Smaraka Award and cash prize by Sakthiswaroopini Rajarajeswari Temple, Manacadu in 2013
- Sangeetha Saparya Puraskaram by Vayyankara Madhusoodanan Smaraka Trust and Anjaneya Musicals in 2014
- Gurusree Puraskaram by Gurupriya School of Music, Puthuppally in 2015
