= Nedumangad Sivanandan =

Ragaratnam Nedumangad Sivanandan (V. Sivanandan Nair, born 30 June 1935) is a violinist in the Carnatic tradition of India, who has been in the forefront of both teaching of the Carnatic tradition on the violin, as well as its performance on stage. His contributions to Indian classical music span over 60 years.

== Early life and background ==
Nedumangad Sivanandan was born to the harmonist-vocalist Neyyanttinkara Vasudevan Pillai and Dakshayani Amma in Neyyatinkara in Trivandrum district of Kerala. His family moved to Nedumangad, also in Trivandrum district, shortly after his birth. His early music training was with his father, after which he joined the Swathi Thirunal Music Academy, Thiruvananthapuram, graduating with a Ganabhushanam in music in 1954.

He went on to do higher studies in the violin in the Gurukula style as the disciple of one of the most famous violinists of the period, Virudunagar Ganapathiya Pillai, who was himself the disciple of the great violin Maestro Kumbakonam Rajamanickam Pillai. Since then Sivanandan has been performing on stage, as well as teaching the art of Carnatic violin to numerous disciples, many of whom have achieved professional excellence with the instrument. He continues to teach presently.

Professionally, he was a music teacher with the Education Department, Government of Kerala, superannuating from service in 1990.

== Professional accomplishments ==
Nedumanagad Sivandan is a well-known accompanying artiste, soloist, teacher, and resource person for numerous music-related activities. He has been recognized with numerous titles and awards, including 'Ragaratna' and Srutilaya's 'Sargaratna'. He received the Kerala Sangeetha Nataka Akademi Award in 2000. He has performed on many stages in India and abroad.

Nedumangad Sivanandan has taught numerous students, including several notable contemporary violinists from Kerala. His notable former students include All India Radio "A" Grade artists Edappally Ajith Kumar, Thiruvizha Sivanandan, Cherthala Sivakumar, Thiruvizha "Viju" S. Anand, Bindu K. Shenoy, V. Sindhu, and Manjoor Renjith; international performer Toronto Jayadevan; and "B High" Grade artist Neelur Jayakumar.

Nedumanagad Sivanandan has accompanied numerous senior vocalists including V. Dakshinamurthy, Neyyattinkara Vasudevan, Parassala Ponnammal, Padmashree K J Yesudas, Sudha Raghunathan, M.G. Radhakrishnan, T.M.Krishna, O.S.Tyagarajan, V. Ramachandran and Matangi Satyamurthy. At the same time, he has mentored numerous young vocalists & instrumentalists including Sankaran Namboothiri, and Vaikom Vijayalakshmi from their initial times. In 2007, he played the role of a violinist in the Malayalam film, Anandabhairavi.

His disciples, together with art lovers in the region, celebrated his 80th birthday on 28 June 2015 as "Sivananda Lahari", a day-long get-together with classical recitals and a public meeting.

== Family ==
Nedumangad Sivanandan is married to Vilasini S. Nair. His daughter, Sindhu V., is herself a violin artiste and teacher of music at the Chembai Memorial Govt. Music College, Palghat. Nedumangad Sivanandan, together with Sindhu and her son, Adarsh Dileep, have performed in several places as the violin trio. His sons are Satish Babu and Santosh Babu.
