= Parassala B. Ponnammal =

Indian Carnatic musician (1924–2021)

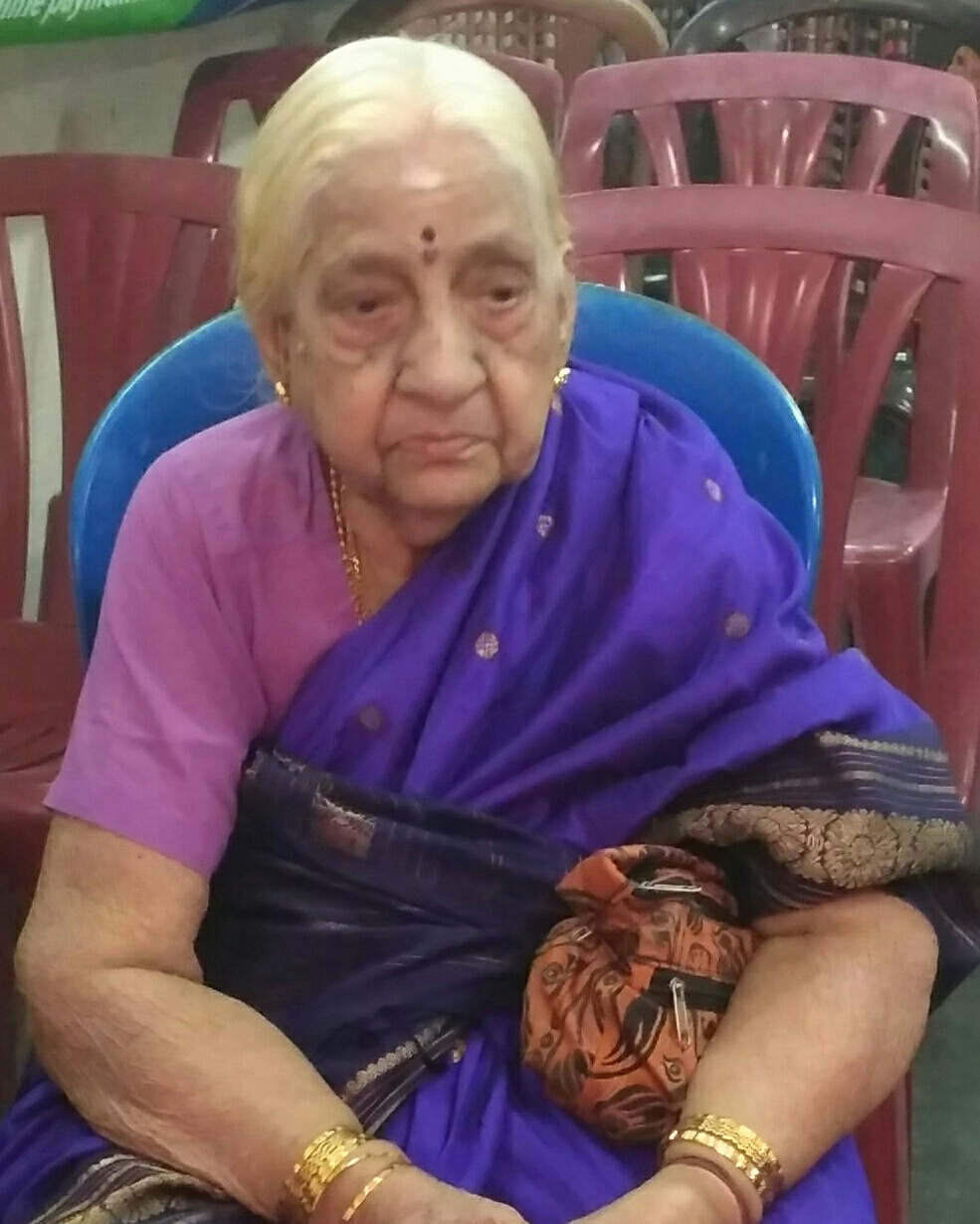
- Ponnammal in 2017

Background information
- Born: 29 November 1924; Parassala, Travancore, British India
- Died: 22 June 2021 (aged 96) Thiruvananthapuram, Kerala, India
- Genre: Indian classical music
- Occupation: Classical vocalist

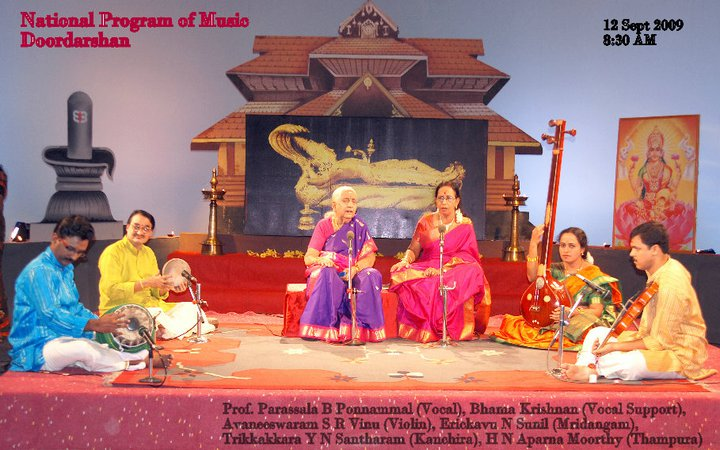
Parassala Ponnammal sings at the Doordarshan National Programme of Music in 2009. Avaneeswaram Vinu (violin), Erickavu N. Sunil (mridangam), Trikkakkara Y. N. Santharam (kanjira)

Parassala B. Ponnammal (29 November 1924 – 22 June 2021) was an Indian Carnatic musician from the south Indian state of Kerala. She was a classical carnatic vocalist in the lineage of Semmangudi Srinivasa Iyer, Muthiah Bhagavathar, and Papanasam Sivan. She was the first woman to perform at the Navaratri Mandapam in Thiruvananthapuram as a part of the Navaratri Celebrations of the Sri Padmanabhaswamy temple in Kerala.

Ponnammal was a recipient of the Padma Shri, India's fourth highest civilian honor, in 2017. She was also a recipient of the Sangeet Natak Akademi Award, Kerala Sangeetha Nataka Akademi Award, Kerala Sangeetha Nataka Akademi Fellowship and the Kerala state government's Swathi Sangeetha Puraskaram.

== Early life ==
Ponnammal was born on 29 November 1924 in Parassala, in the present-day Thiruvananthapuram district in the south Indian state of Kerala, to R. Mahadeva Iyer and A. Bhagavathy Ammal in a Kerala Iyer family. She started her studies in carnatic music as a child; during the early 1940s, she was the first female student to enroll in the newly started Swathi Thirunal College of Music in Thiruvananthapuram, which was then known as Sree Swathi Thirunal Music Academy. She graduated from the academy with a first rank in "Gana Bhushanam" and "Gana Praveena" courses.

She learned from several notable figures in carnatic music, including Papanasam Sivan, Harikesanallur Muthiah Bhagavatar and Semmangudi Srinivasa Iyer.

== Career ==
Smt. Parassala B. Ponnammal receiving the Sangeet Natak Akademi Award, 2009.

Ponnammal started her career as a music teacher by joining the Cotton Hill Girls High School in Thiruvananthapuram. She later became the first female member of the teaching faculty at the Swathi Thirunal College of Music in Thiruvananthapuram. She was the first woman principal to head the RLV College of Music and Fine Arts at Tripunithura. As a teacher, some of her disciples included Kumara Kerala Varma, Neyyattinkara Vasudevan, K. Omanakutty, A. K. Raveendranath, Nedumangad Sasidharan, M.G. Radhakrishnan, Palkulangara Ambika Devi, G. Seethalakshmi, S Mahadevan, Amruta Venkatesh. Renowned Carnatic vocalist Mangad K. Natesan, his daughter Prof. (Dr.)Mini N and her husband Dr. Sajith E. N. and their daughter Dr. Mythili E. S. have also learned from her.

Ponnammal was a carnatic musician in the lineage of Semmangudi Srinivasa Iyer, Muthiah Bhagavathar, and Papanasam Sivan. Some of her performances included the Guruvayur Puresa Suprabhatham, Trisivapuresa Suprabhatham, Ulsava Prabhandam, Navarathri Kriti, Meenambika Sthothram, in addition to compositions of Irayamman Thampi and K. C. Kesava Pillai.

She became the first woman to perform at the Navaratri celebrations of the Sri Padmanabhaswamy temple in Kerala when she performed at the Navarathri Mandapam in 1996. In doing so, she broke a centuries-old restriction that forbade women from performing at the temple. She went on to perform there for the next ten years. She continued to perform across India and abroad through her 80s.

Ponnammal was a recipient of the Padma Shri, India's fourth highest civilian honor in 2017. She also received the Kerala State Government's Swathi Sangeetha Puraskaram, the Sangeet Natak Akademi Award in 2009, and the Kerala Sangeetha Nataka Akademi Award.

== Personal life ==
Ponnammal was married to R. Devanayagam Iyer, who pre-deceased her. The couple had three sons - D. Mahadevan, D. Subramanian, D Ramaswamy - and a daughter, D Kamala. Her children Ramaswamy and Kamala pre-deceased her. She died on 22 June 2021, at her home in Valiyassala, Thiruvananthapuram, aged 96.

== Recognition ==
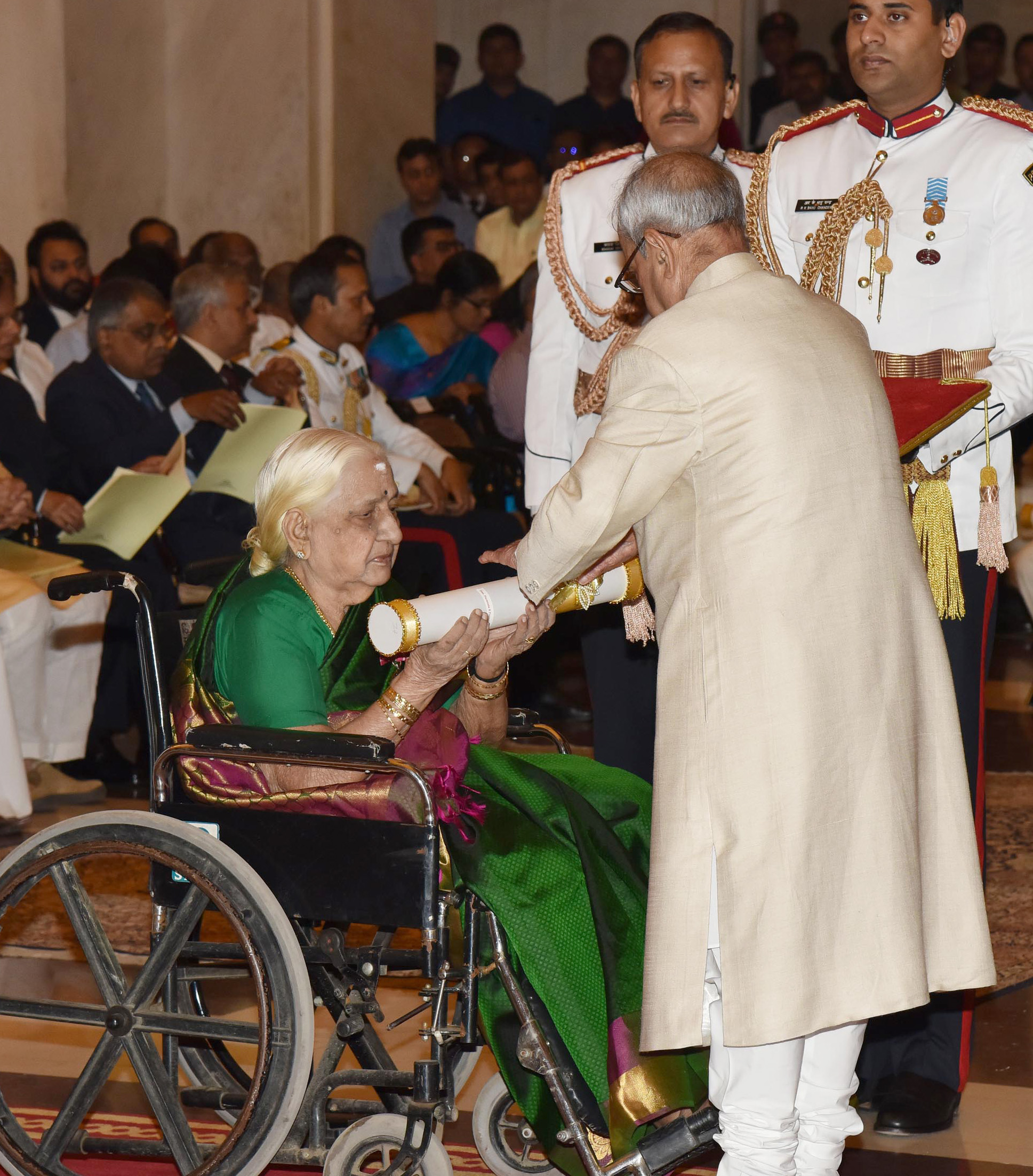
The President, Shri Pranab Mukherjee presenting the Padma Shri Award to Smt. Parassala B. Ponnammal, at the Civil Investiture Ceremony, at Rashtrapati Bhavan, in New Delhi on April 13, 2017

Her awards include:

- Padma Shri, Government of India, New Delhi, 2017
- M. G. Radhakrishnan Award, 2016
- Lifetime Achievement Award, Chennai Fine Arts, Tamil Nadu, 2015
- Sangeetha Prabhakara Award, 2012
- S. Ganesha Sarma Award, instituted by Ganesha Sarma Educational and Charitable Society, 2009
- Sangeet Natak Akademi Award, 2009
- Swathi Sangeetha Puraskaram, 2009
- Sree Guruvayurappan Chembai Puraskaram, 2009
- Kerala Sangeetha Nataka Akademi Fellowship, 2002
- Kerala Sangeetha Nataka Akademi Award, 1977
