= Swathi Thirunal College of Music =

Music college in Thiruvananthapuram, Kerala, India

Sri Swathi Thirunal College of Music
- ശ്രീ സ്വാതി തിരുനാള്‍ സംഗീത കോളേജ്
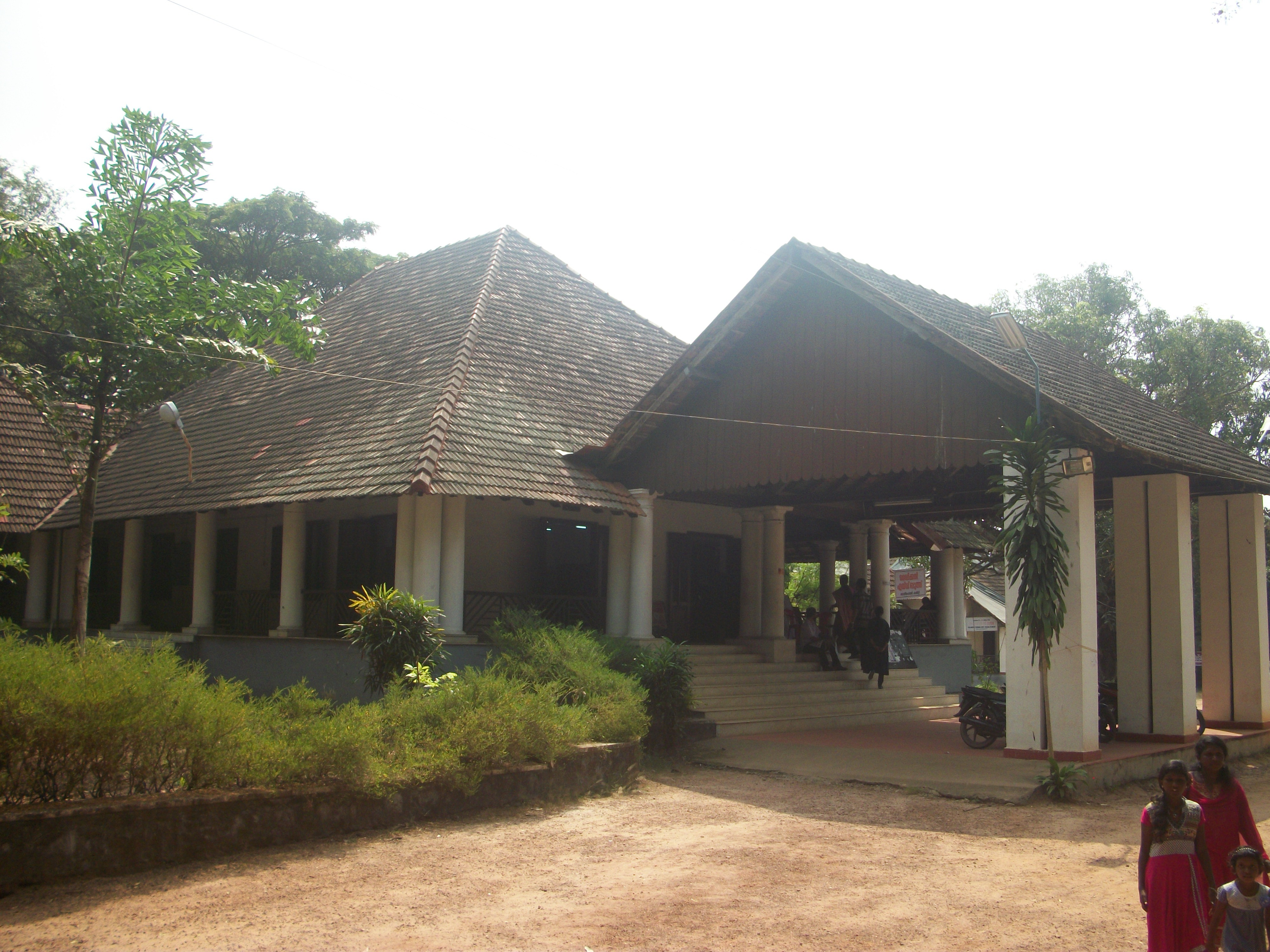
- Front view of the college
- Former names: The Music Academy
- Type: Public
- Established: 1939
- Affiliations: Kerala University
- Principal: Prof Veena V R
- Academic staff: 21
- Location: Thiruvananthapuram, Kerala, India; 8°29′23″N 76°57′23″E
- Campus: Urban
- Website: http://sstcmtvpm.ac.in

Swathi Thirunal College of Music is a music college in Thiruvananthapuram, Kerala, India. It was founded in 1939. It was first named as "The Music Academy". The name was renamed as Swathi Thirunal College of Music in 1962. The founder of this institution was the last reigning King of Travancore, Sree Chithira Thirunal Balarama Varma in 1939. The administration of the institution was under the control of the Travancore royal family earlier. Eminent musicians like Muthiah Bhagavatar who was the first Principal, Semmangudi Srinivasa Iyer, etc. have served as Principals of this college.

The primary objective of this venture was to popularize the kritits of Maharaja Sree Swathi Thirunal. The institution was renamed as Sree Swathi Thirunal College of Music in 1962.

== Courses ==
Earlier, a three-year certificate course in Music - "Gayaka and Gayika" for male and female students respectively was provided in the institute. In 1961, a committee, which included eminent musicians and music educators like Mrs. Lekshmi Narayanan Nair, Sri. Semmangudi Srinivasa Iyer, Dr. Musuri Subrahmanya Iyer and Prof. P. Sambamurthy constituted by the Government of Kerala prepared a comprehensive curriculum and syllabus for the course in this institution. Later "Ganabhooshanam and Ganapraveen", (four-year Diploma course) were introduced. The college was affiliated to the University of Kerala in 1999 and a unique 'Bachelor in Performing Arts' course was initiated.

Presently the college has entered into new avenues, announcing 8 new courses as part of continuing education programme. The courses are meant for those who have an aptitude in learning music, those who would like to go for advanced studies in group kritis, ragamalikas, and ragam-tanam-pallavis and for those who are interested in 'music direction'.

Eminent Principals and Students of the College

Late Dr. L. Muttayyah Bhagavathar was the founder Principal of this esteemed music institution. He was replaced by the great Carnatic Music doyen, the late Sri. Semmangudi R. Srinivasa Iyer. Late G. N. Balasubrahmaniam, Late Chalakkudy Narayana Swami, Late Mavelikkara Velukkutty Nair, Late Mavelikkara Prabhakara Varma, Late Vechur N. Hari Hara Subrahmania Iyer have also served as the heads of this eminent organization. K. Vasantha Kumari is the current principal.

Dr.K.J.Yesudas, Mangad. K. Natesan, Neyyatinkara Vasudevan, Dr. K. Omanakutty, Pudukkode Krishna Murthy, M. G. Radhakrishnan, Raveendaran (music director) and Parassala Ravi are some noteworthy students of this institution. New talents like Kallara Gopan and Panthalam Balan were also the products of this college.

== Notable alumni ==
- Dr. K.J. Yesudas – Classical and playback singer.
- Neyyattinkara Vasudevan – Classical and playback singer.
- Kaviyoor Revamma – Classical and playback singer.
- Raveendran – Film Music composer and singer.
- M. G. Radhakrishnan – Film Music composer and singer.
- Dr. K. Omanakutty
- Najim Arshad, Singer
- Parassala B. Ponnammal - legendary singer
- S. P. Sreekumar, Actor
- S. Easwara Varma, Violinist
- M. G. Radhakrishnan
- B. Sasikumar
- Thiruvizha Jayashankar
- K. S. Harisankar
- Vishnu Vijay
- Johnpaul George
- K. G. Jayan
- V. T. Murali, Music Composer
- Dr.Sreedev Rajagopalan, Carnatic Vocalist
