= Ayitham =

1988 film by Venu Nagavally

- Theatrical release poster
- Directed by: Venu Nagavally
- Written by: Venu Nagavally
- Produced by: Ambika; Radha
- Starring: Mohanlal; Ambika; Radha; Sukumari
- Cinematography: Vipin Mohan
- Edited by: K. P. Hariharaputhran
- Music by: M. G. Radhakrishnan
- Production company: ARS Productions
- Distributed by: Seven Arts Release
- Release date: 7 April 1988
- Country: India
- Language: Malayalam

Ayitham (transl. Excommunication / Untouchability) is a 1988 Indian Malayalam-language drama film written and directed by Venu Nagavally and produced by Ambika and Radha sisters. The film stars Mohanlal, Ambika, Radha and Sukumari in lead roles. The film features music composed by M. G. Radhakrishnan. The plot is set in an Agraharam.

== Plot ==
Vasudevan is a renowned singer of a village. Once his small village was known in his name. However, with fame came comfort; comfort to pursue his innate wild nature. This led to destruction of his life and his family. His son, Shankaran is unemployed and Bhama, daughter of the village's landlord is in love with him. Though he doesn't reciprocate as she would love to. The villagers are poor but they try to live as decently as possible with available resources. However, it becomes impossible for everyone to handle the poverty and low quality of life. This leads them to alternative choices that are not that decent, and those some conform to it to just survive. Bhama is married off to Mani Iyer, another reputable singer but her marriage is not a happy one. Because Mani Iyer is also not a stranger to the wilder comforts that fame provides. The questions of will Shankaran be able to find a job that can uplift his family, and will Bhama find happiness again in her life, form the climax of the story. The film is a diorama of life in poverty and people trying to live through it with values and fellowship.

== Cast ==
- Mohanlal as Shankaran
- Ambika as Bhama
- Radha as Chinna
- Nedumudi Venu as Rangan
- Priya as Kasthoori
- Sukumari
- Jagathy Sreekumar as N. S. Thovala
- Innocent as Joseph
- L. P. R. Varma as Vasudhevan Bhagavathar
- Murali as Kachery Mani Iyyer
- Santhosh as Govindhankutty
- Maniyanpilla Raju as Thankamai
- Sukumaran as Abu
- Seema as Paapamma
- V. K. Ramasamy as Periyaswamy
- Sankaradi as Vikraman
- Louba Schild as Louba
- Nandu

== Production ==
Ayitham was produced by actresses and sisters Ambika and Radha through their production house ARS Productions, they also appeared in the principal roles alongside Mohanlal. The film was written by Venu Nagavally and was also his third directorial. The film was launched on 6 December 1987 at AVM Studios with actor-politician M. G. Ramachandran being a guest in the pooja function of the film.

== Soundtrack ==
The film features original songs composed by M. G. Radhakrishnan and lyrics by O. N. V. Kurup. The song "Oruvakkil Oru Nokkil" was based on the jog raga.

Song	Singers	Lyrics	Length
Aliveni	K. S. Chithra, K Omanakkutty		
Ga Ma Ga Ri Ga Pa [Ezhu Suswarangalaay]	K. J. Yesudas, B. A. Chidambaranath	ONV Kurup	
Ilamarimaan Nayane	K. S. Chithra		
Jagadodhaarana	KS Chithra		
Maaye	KS Chithra, K Omanakkutty		
Nalinamizhi [Bit]	KS Chithra, K Omanakkutty		
Oruvakkil Oru Nokkil	K. J. Yesudas	ONV Kurup	
Parama Purusha	KS Chithra, K Omanakkutty		
Thankamani Anna	KS Chithra, MG Sreekumar	ONV Kurup	
Uyyaala Loogavaiya [M]	K. J. Yesudas		
Uyyala loogavaiya [F]	KS Chithra		
Vaaneedevi	KS Chithra, K Omanakkutty		

== Release ==
Ayitham was released in theatres on 7 April 1988.
