= Palkulangara Ambika Devi =

Indian Carnatic musician (born 1939)

Palkulangara K. Ambika Devi
- Born: K. Ambika Devi; 3 December 1939 (age 86); Travancore, British India
- Occupation: Singer
- Spouse: Chennithala Krishnankutty Nair
- Children: 4
- Parents: K. N. Kesava Pillai (father); C. K. Karthayaini Amma (mother)
- Awards: Kerala Sangeetha Nataka Akademi Award (1992); Kerala Sangeetha Nataka Akademi Fellowship (2010)
- Musical career
- Genres: Carnatic music
- Instrument: Vocals

Palkulangara K. Ambika Devi is an Indian Carnatic singer and music teacher from Kerala. She won the Kerala Sangeetha Nataka Akademi Award 1992 and the Kerala Sangeetha Nataka Akademi Fellowship for the year 2010, from the Kerala Sangeetha Nataka Akademi, Government of Kerala. She also won many other awards and honors including Best Musician Award (1973) and Sangeetha Kala Acharya title from the Madras Music Academy, Chennai.

== Biography ==
K. Ambika Devi was born on December 3, 1939, in Thiruvananthapuram, Kerala, to K. N. Kesava Pillai and C.K. Karthayaini Amma. Although her father, Kesava Pillai, who was the head accountant in the Travancore palace, and her other brothers were very strict, seeing her interest in music, everyone agreed to teach her music. Her mother Karthiyaniyamma was also a singer. She started studying classical music from the age of nine.

She started her musical studies at a very young age and later joined the Swathi Thirunal College of Music, Thiruvananthapuram for higher studies, from where she passed the Gana Bhushanam and Vidwan courses with first rank in 1959. When she passed seventh grade, it was her brother Sethuraman who took her to a music college. She studied music under the tutelage of eminent people like Semmangudi Srinivasa Iyer, C. S. Krishna Iyer, Parassala B. Ponnammal, and Nellai T. V. Krishnamoorthy.

=== Personal life ===
Ambika Devi married Chennithala Krishnankutty Nair, who was a professor of mridangam at the Swathi Thirunal Government Music College where she studied. They have four children, Harikrishnan, Shyamakrishnan, Swathi Krishnan and Purandarakrishnan. Their son Harikrishnan R., a Carnatic violinist was also worked and retired as principal of the Swathi Thirunal College of Music. Another son Shyamakrishnan is a mridangam player.

She lives in her house 'Shaleenam' in Thycaude, Thiruvananthapuram.

== Career ==
Ambika Devi, who qualified from the College of Music, worked as a teacher in the same institution and retired from there in 1995, as the department head of music, after 32 years of service. She then served as a reader at Sree Sankaracharya University of Sanskrit and as a visiting guest faculty in the music department of the University of Kerala. Vaiyankara Madhusudhanan, Mavelikkara Subramaniam, singer G. Venugopal, Varkala C.S. Jayaram and many other are among her disciples.

Ambika Devi also performed concerts while working as a music teacher. She is one of the prominent people who popularized Malayalam kirtans at a time when Sanskrit was prevalent in the Carnatic music scene. She used the works of Swathi Thirunal and others for this.

Ambika Devi, who has performed at various venues across the country, is famous for her 'Kshetranjali' music program, which brings together prominent temples in Kerala.

== Awards and honors ==
Ambika Devi, who won first place at the national level in a music competition conducted by All India Radio, in 1958, is also the first Malayali to receive an award from the President of India. She received award from Dr. Rajendra Prasad, first president of India. She won the Kerala Sangeetha Nataka Akademi Award in 1992. In 2012, she received the Kerala Sangeetha Nataka Akademi Fellowship for the year 2010, the highest award of Kerala Sangeetha Nataka Akademi, Government of Kerala.

In 2012, she received MS Subbulekshmi Award instituted by the Sree Krishna Natya Sangeetha Academy. In 2021, she received the Sangeetha Prabhakara award. In 2025, she has been awarded the Srinatraja Sangeetha Sabha Award instituted by the Srinatraja Sangeetha Sabha.

Ambika Devi received the Best Musician Award from the Madras Music Academy in 1973. In 2024, the Madras Music Academy conferred on her the title of Sangeetha Kala Acharya.

While speaking at a felicitation ceremony organized by the Vayalar Ramavarma Cultural Centre to honour Ambika Devi on World Music Day, Kerala state Food Minister G. R. Anil has said that Palkulangara Ambika Devi is a great musician who Kerala should respect.
