= Erickavu N. Sunil =

Indian Mridangam player

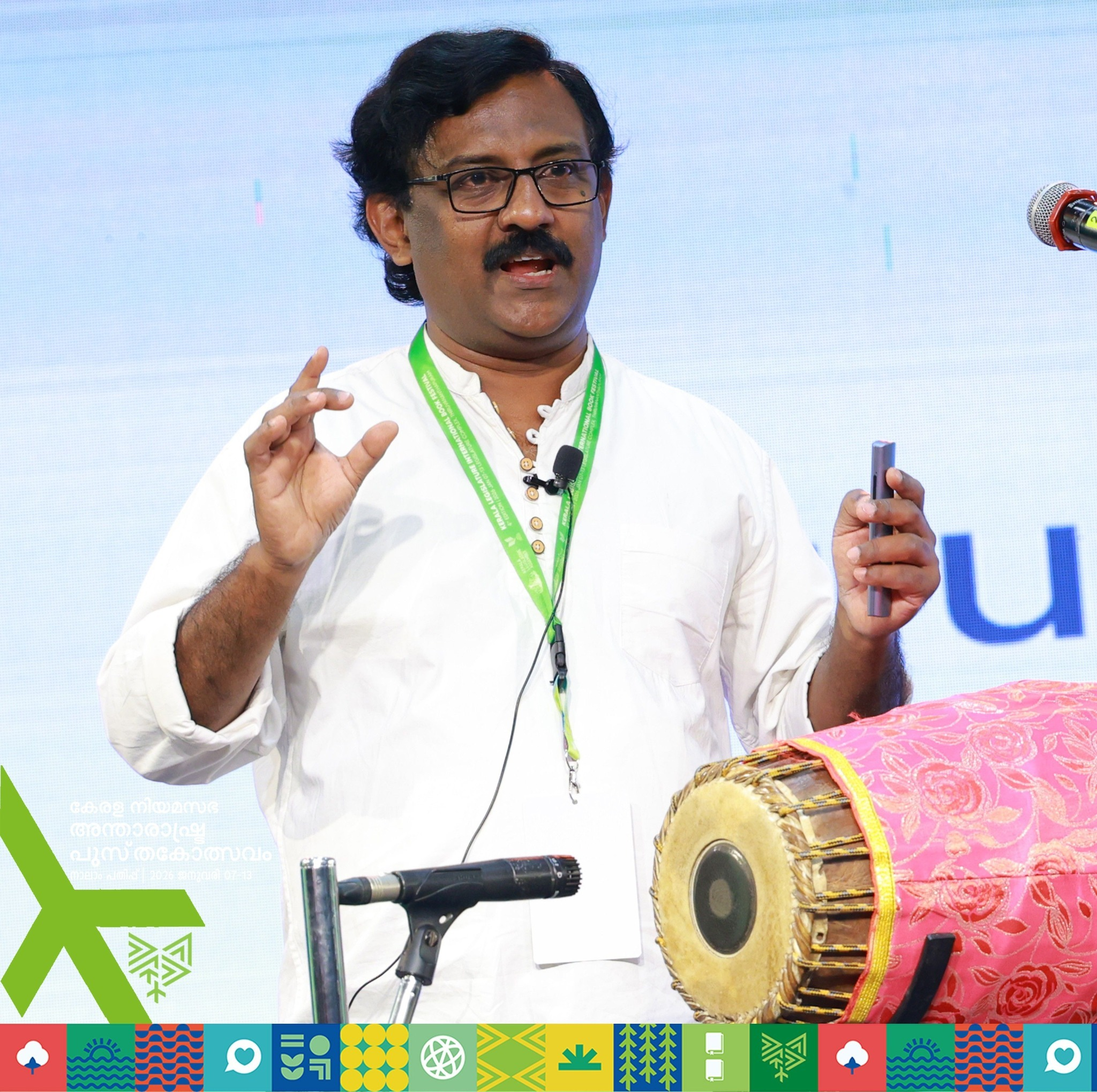

Background information
- Born: 15 March 1976; Haripad, Alappuzha district, Kerala, India
- Occupations: Assistant Professor - Mridangam, Multilingual Author, Knowledge Disseminator
- Instrument: Mridangam
- Years active: 1985–present
- Website: www.erickavunsunil.com

Erickavu N. Sunil, aka Sunil Narayana is a South Indian percussionist, educator, and author, best known for his expertise in mridangam, the principal rhythmic instrument in Carnatic classical music. He holds an 'A Grade' from All India Radio (Akashvani), India's national public radio broadcaster, in the discipline of Mridangam. Currently, he serves as an Assistant Professor (UGC) in Mridangam at the Kerala Kalamandalam. Sunil is the author of the book "Resounding Mridangam" (2021), which is widely referenced in academic and performing arts circles. His second work, "Mattolikkollunna Mridangam" (Malayalam: മാറ്റൊലിക്കൊള്ളുന്ന മൃദംഗം) was published by the Kerala Bhasha Institute on 1 March 2025. Sunil has conducted seminars, lecture demonstrations, workshops, and scholarly presentations at universities and cultural institutions across India.

== Early life and background ==
He started learning the mridangam at the age of four. His initial teachers were Krishnappa Bhagavathar and M.S. Raju. He had his advanced studies in mridangam from Mavelikkara Velukkutty Nair.

== Musical career ==
An A-grade artist of All India Radio and Doordarshan, Sunil has performed alongside Padmabhushan Sangeetha Kalanidhi T. V. Sankaranarayanan, Padmasri Neyyattinkara Vasudevan, Padmasri Parassala Ponnammal, Madhurai G.S. Mony, Mavelikkara Prabhakara Varma, K. Omanakutty, K. Venktaramanan, S. Sowmya, Kunnakkudi Balamuralikrishna, Sreevalsan J. Menon, Sankaran Namboothiri, Thiruvengadu Jayaraman, Sharreth, M. Jayachandran, and Balabhaskar. Sunil teaches Mridangam online and has students in Germany, the US, the UK, Italy and the Middle East.

== Indeevaram Cultural Trust ==
Indeevaram is a Trivandrum-based cultural trust founded by Sunil in 2018.

== Resounding Mridangam ==
Erickavu N. Sunil's first book Resounding Mridangam: The Majestic South-Indian Drum was formally released in India on 18 April 2021 by K. S. Chithra. The book received the Kerala Kalamandalam Kalagrandham Award (the best book for art literature) for 2023.

== Mattolikkollunna Mridangam ==
Mattolikkollunna Mridangam (മാറ്റൊലിക്കൊള്ളുന്ന മൃദംഗം) is the second book authored by Erickavu N. Sunil and published by the Kerala Bhasha Institute. It was released on 1 March 2025, with the book being presented by K. S. Chithra to Divya S. Iyer.
