= V. T. Murali =

Indian playback singer

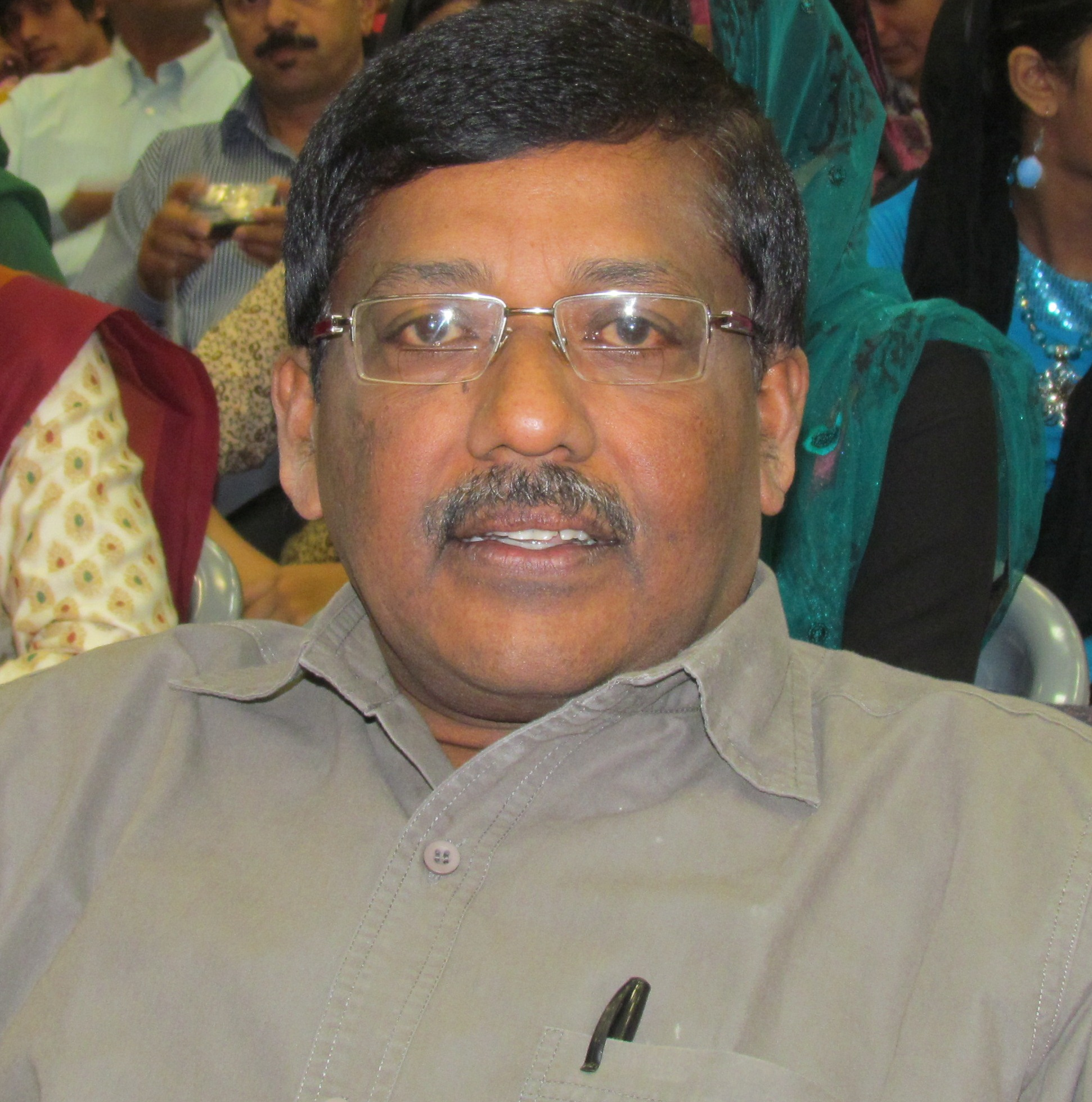

Background information
- Born: 18 November 1955 (age 70); Vadakara, Kozhikode district, Kerala
- Occupations: Singer, Music composer
- Years active: 1979–present

V. T. Murali is an Indian playback singer and music critic from Kerala. He is known for many songs including the song "Othu palliyilannu nammal" composed by Padma Shri K. Raghavan from the movie Thenthulli directed by National award-winning director K. P. Kumaran. He was a former board member of Kerala State Film Development. Corporation. He is also the president of K Raghavan master Award foundation As a music critic, Murali has written 12 books.

== Biography ==
He was born to V. T. Kumaran and Santha.

Vadakara Krishnadasan Master taught him the basics of music. Murali has sung in many local plays. After his undergraduate degree at Madappally College, he passed Gana Bhushanam course from Swathi Thirunal College of Music, Thiruvananthapuram. Later, he became a student of K. V. Narayanaswamy, V. Rajan Iyer and V. Krishnamurthy of Madras Music College, Palakkad. In 1979, he sang for his first film. A communist follower, he has sung in many plays of KPAC. He sang for drama troupes like KPAC, Thiruvananthapuram Sangh Chetana and Kozhikode Kalinga.

Currently a member of the Executive Committee of the Kerala Sangeethanataka Akademi, he was earlier a member of the General Council of the Kerala Sangeethanataka Akademi and the Director of the Kerala State Film Development Corporation.

== Personal life ==
He and his wife Sasikala have 2 daughters. They lives in their house Manjima at Vadakara, Kozhikode district.

== Books written on Music ==
- Sangeethathinte Keraleya Padangan (in Malayalam). Kerala Bhasha Institute. 2015. ISBN 9789385313547.
- Adayathirikkatte Vathilukal (in Malayalam). Logos Books. October 2017. ISBN 9789386744265.
- Paattukondoru Jeevitham (in Malayalam). Saikatham Books. ISBN 9789382909118.
- Aa malar Kaalathin Ormakalil (in Malayalam). Chintha Publishers. 1 January 2020. ISBN 9789386364357.
- Paattorukkam (in Malayalam). D. C. Books. 2013. ISBN 9788126441518.
- Ragamalayalam (in Malayalam). Olive Books. 1 January 2006.
- K Raghavan oru Sangeethavicharam (in Malayalam). Poorna Publications. 1 January 2012. ISBN 978-8130013299.
- Thurannuvecha Sangeetha Jalakangal (in Malayalam). Mathrubhumi Books. 2011. ISBN 9788182650695.
- Vakkukal Padum Nadiyoram (2019)
- Ganarachanayude Tachushastram (in Malayalam). National Book Stall. April 2013.

== Awards and honours ==
- Kerala Sangeetha Nataka Akademi Awards - 2003 - Best Singer (Drama)
- Kerala Sangeetha Nataka Akademi Award - 2007 - Best Singer (light music)
- Raghavan Master Award
- Thoppil Bhasi Award of Kuwait Kerala Association
- Abu Dhabi Yuvakalasahithi Kampisseri Award
- Chandpasha Award of Kerala Mappila Kala Akademi
- Gramadeepam Award
- He was honoured by Kerala Sangeetha Nataka Akademi, Kerala State Chalachitra Academy and Kerala Folklore Academy by celebrating 50th year of his singing career, in 2019.
