= Thiruvizha Jayashankar =

Indian classical musician and a nagaswaram Player(born 1940)

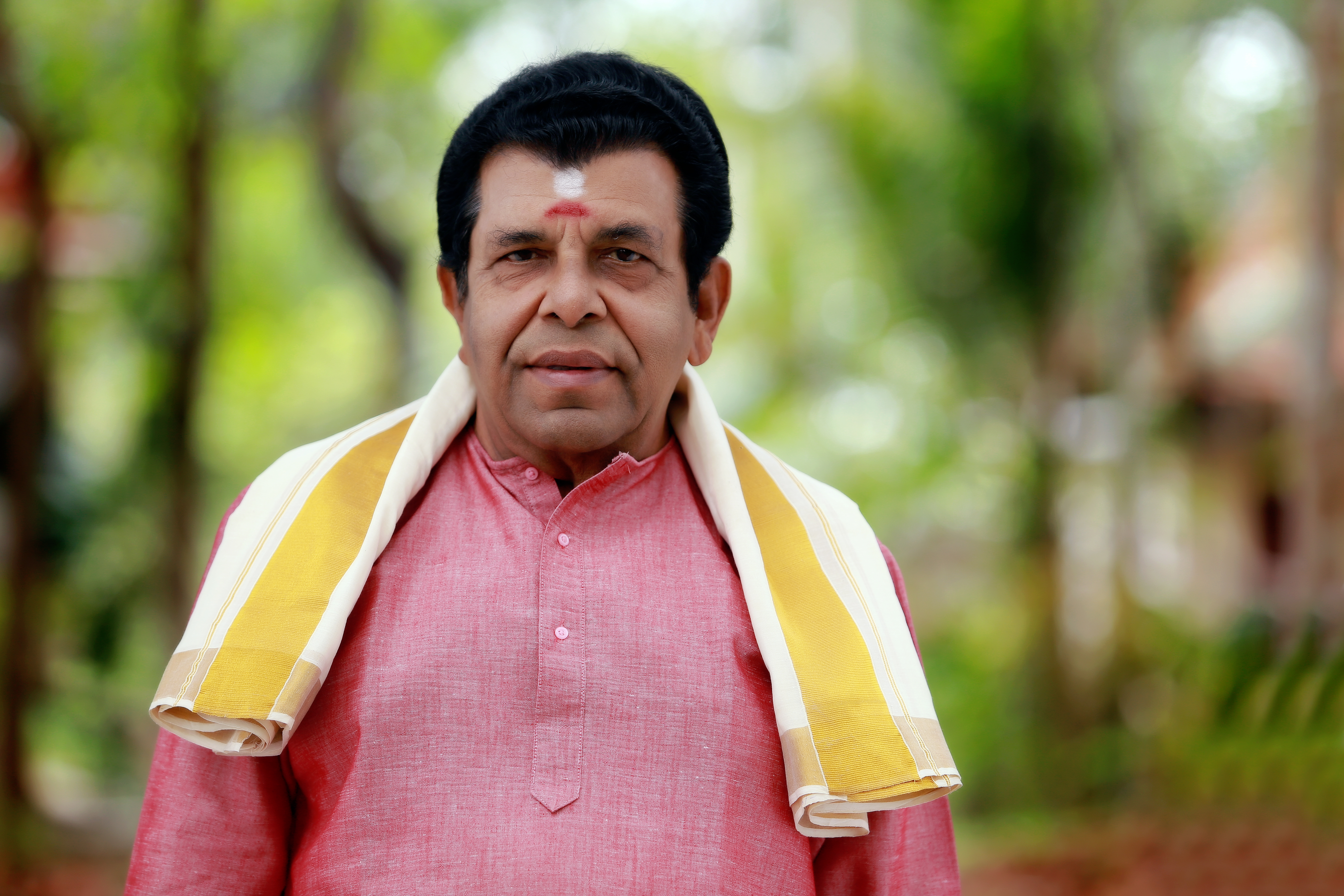
- Thiruvizha Jayashankar, renowned nagaswaram artist from Kerala

Background information
- Born: 1 February 1940 (age 86); Thiruvizha, Cherthala Alleppey, India
- Genre: Indian classical music
- Occupation: Music Performer
- Instrument: Nagaswaram
- Years active: 1955–present

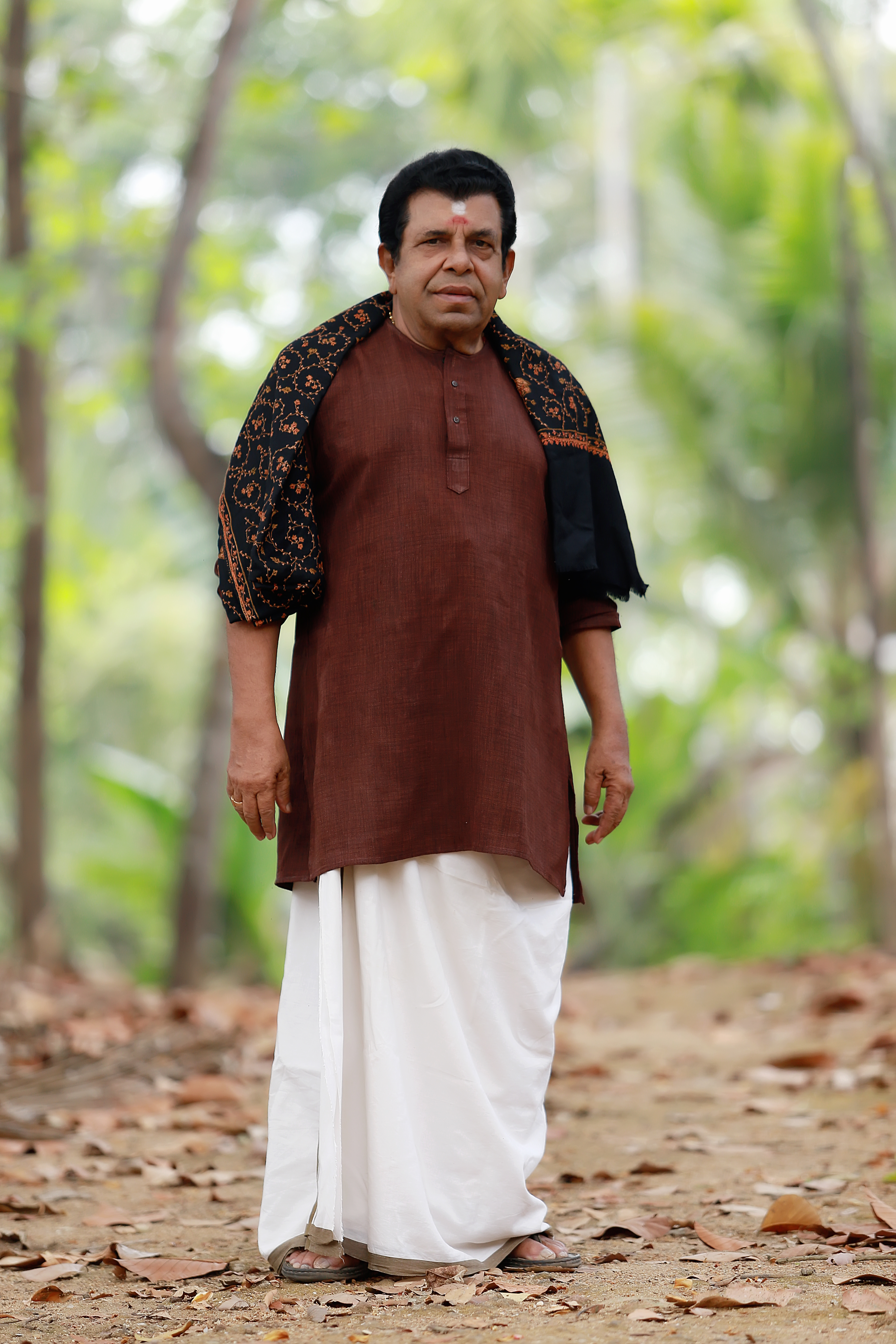
Thiruvizha Jayashankar

Thiruvizha Jayashankar (born 1940) is an Indian classical musician and a well known nagaswaram expert in South India.

== Early life and education ==
Born in the family of musicians in a small village Thiruvizha, Alleppey, Jayashankar was keen to learn music and drawing in his childhood. He is the son of nadaswara maestro Thiruvizha Raghava Panickar and grandson of Thiruvizha Sanku Panickar. Jayashankar opted for preliminary lessons in the nagaswaram under his grandfather and later received advanced training from his father with whom he began playing in the temples of central Travancore almost on a regular basis. His debut performance (Arangetram) was in the year 1955 at the age of 16 which was held at the Pathiyoor Devi Temple, Kayamkulam.

He has completed his diploma (Ganabhooshanam) in music from RLV College of Music and Fine Arts (University of Kerala) in 1957. noted Indian playback singer K. J. Yesudas was his batch mate. After the completion of diploma course, he has taken BA degree in music from Government College, Chittur (University of Caicut) near Palakkad and post graduate diploma (Ganapraveena) from Swathi Thirunal College of Music (University of Kerala), Trivandrum.

== Career ==
Jayashankar opted for a central Government job in All India Radio, Thiruvananthapuram in 1965 and worked there till retirement. He was also a visiting professor at Annamalai University, Chidambaram.

His musical journey with great thavil mastro Valayapatti A. R. Subramaniam proved to be a landmark in live nadaswaram concerts. Haripad Murukadas and Vettikkavala Sasi Kumar are few of his famous disciples.

== Awards and recognition ==
- Kerala Sangeetha Nataka Akademi Award
- Kerala Sangeetha Nataka Akademi Fellowship 2000
- Kalaimamani from the Government of Tamil Nadu
- Central Sangeet Natak Academy Award 2013
- Harivarasanam Award 2026
