= K. S. Harisankar =

Indian playback singer

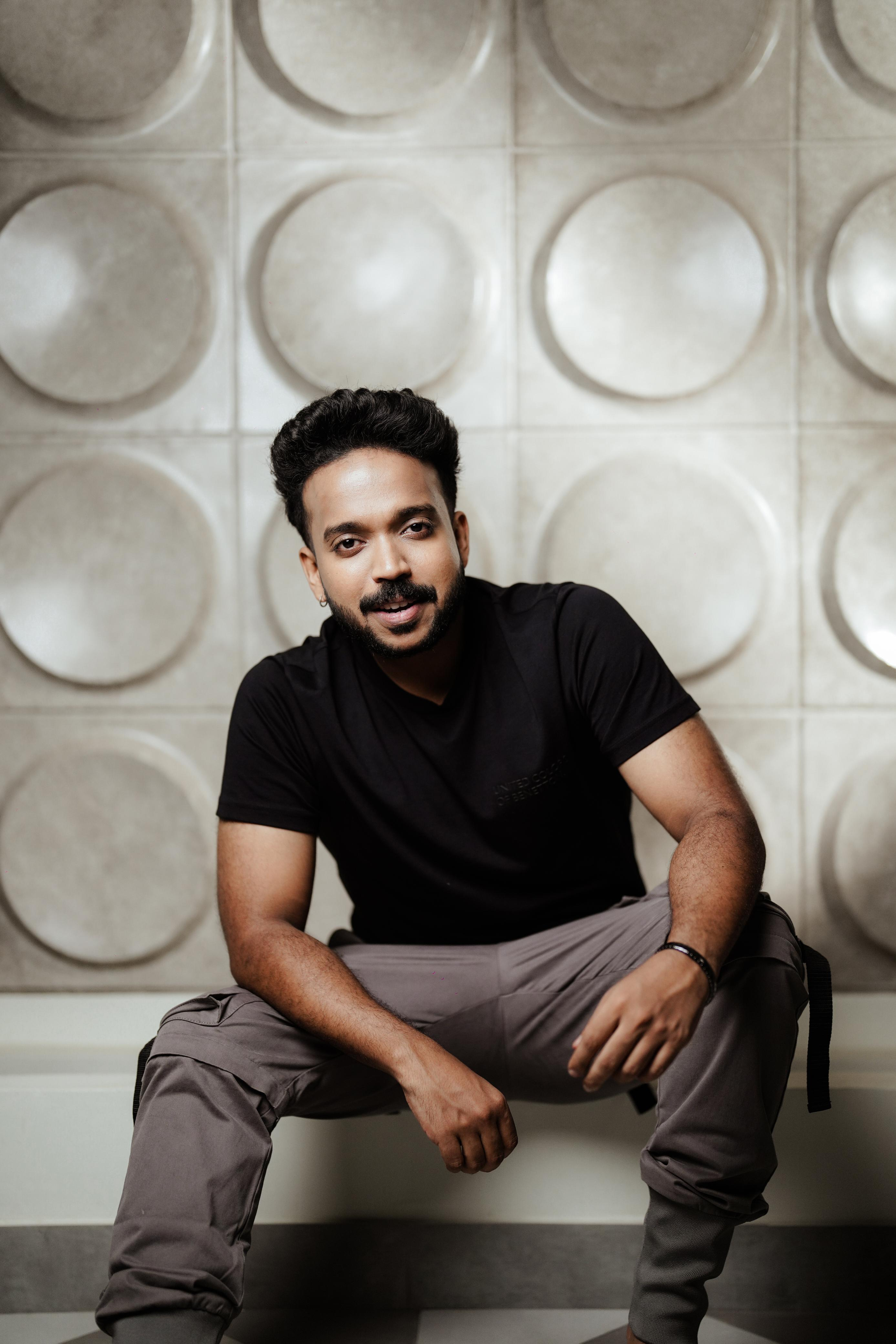
- Born: Kannamangalam Sreekumar Harisankar; 18 November 1993 (age 32); Thiruvananthapuram, Kerala, India
- Occupations: Carnatic musician; Indian Playback Singer
- Years active: 2014–present
- Spouse: Ghadha Sidharthan (m. 2017)
- Relatives: K. Omanakutty (maternal grandmother); M. G. Radhakrishnan (maternal grand-uncle); M. G. Sreekumar (maternal grand-uncle); M. R. Rajakrishnan (uncle)
- Musical career
- Genres: Indian classical music; playback singing
- Instruments: Vocals & Mridangam
- Label: KS Harisankar

Kannamangalam Sreekumar Harisankar (born 18 November 1993) is a Carnatic musician and Indian playback singer known for his work across South Indian cinema, performing in Malayalam, Tamil, Telugu, and Kannada films. He is the recipient of a Kerala State Film Awards for Best Playback Singer.

He made his Malayalam debut under composer Ouseppachan with the song Kaatte from Karnavar. He rose to prominence with hits such as Jeevamshamayi (Theevandi), Vennilave (Queen), Nilamanaltharikalil ( Kismath), Pavizha Mazhaye (Athiran), Nee Hima Mazhayayai, Kamini (Anugraheethan Antony), Vaanam Chaayum (Anarkali), Hatja ( Alappuzha Gymkhana) and Kiliye (ARM).

In Tamil cinema, Harisankar was introduced by composer Dhibu Ninan Thomas with Pesatha Mozhiye (a duet with Chinmayi) and later collaborated with G. V. Prakash Kumar for the pan-Indian film Thalaivii. His latest is ‘Venguzhalil Izhaynthayedee’ from the movie Kantara Chapter 1.

His entry into Kannada cinema came through Nobin Paul's composition Hymn of Dharma for 777 Charlie, followed by Dhare Neenididaasare-Sapta Sagaradaache and Ello Side B by Charan Raj. He also sang the latest Malayalam version of Oh Madanamanamohini and Brahmakalasha for Kantara Chapter 1 for B. Ajaneesh Loknath.

In Telugu, Harisankar rendered the Malayalam version of Naatu Naatu from S. S. Rajamouli’s RRR, the Academy Award and Golden Globe winning track for Best Original Song for Hymn of Dharma for 777 Charlie and Virisina for Raajahyogam. He has also contributed to other pan-Indian films such as Sita Ramam, 2018, 777 Charlie, and Kantara: Chapter 1.

Rooted in Carnatic music, he has performed at prestigious venues including the Madras Music Academy, Shanmukhananda Sabha, Narada Gana Sabha, and the Chembai Sangeetholsavam.

== Early life and musical background ==
Harisankar comes from a family of musicians. His father, Alappuzha K. Sreekumar, and his mother, Kamala Lakshmi, were musicians, and his grandmother is Carnatic vocalist K. Omanakutty. His family also includes musicians M. G. Radhakrishnan and M. G. Sreekumar.

He trained in Carnatic music from an early age and continued to perform classical concerts while pursuing playback singing.

== Career ==
Harisankar made his playback debut in 1997, singing for the film Saphalyam alongside K. J. Yesudas. The following year, he recorded for the devotional album Sabarimala with his granduncle M. G. Sreekumar.

In 2008, he won the All India Radio National Classical Music Competition and was later accredited as a Grade A artiste. In 2023, he was invited to inaugurate the Soorya Festival on 1 October—a date traditionally reserved for K. J. Yesudas.

By 2019, Harisankar had received wider attention for Malayalam film songs including "Jeevamshamayi" from Theevandi and "Pavizha Mazhaye" from Athiran. In an interview with The Times of India, he said that he intended to continue his Carnatic concert career alongside film playback singing.

In 2023, Harisankar sang "Kannil Kannil", the Malayalam version of a song from Sita Ramam. Onmanorama described "Pavizha Mazhaye" as his biggest hit at the time.

He also recorded "Karinthol", the Malayalam-language version of "Naatu Naatu" from S. S. Rajamouli's film RRR.

In 2024, he recorded "Kiliye" for the Malayalam film Ajayante Randam Moshanam. The song earned him the Kerala State Film Award for Best Male Playback Singer in 2025.

In 2025, he performed "Hatja" for Alappuzha Gymkhana, with music composed by Vishnu Vijay and lyrics by Suhail Koya.

Harisankar's 2026 recordings included "Priyasakhi", composed by Hesham Abdul Wahab for the Telugu film Epic – First Semester. He sang "Avarohanam" with composer Vishnu Vijay for the Malayalam film Athiradi.

In Kannada cinema, he performed "Cheluve Kele Cheluve" with Harshika Devanath for Bail, starring Shiva Rajkumar. The song was composed by B. Ajaneesh Loknath and written by Pavan Wadeyar.

He also contributed to Vishnu Vijay's soundtrack for the Malayalam film Bethlehem Kudumba Unit. Harisankar and Poornima Kannan performed "Varnajaalam", written by Vinayak Sasikumar. He also performed "Indrajaalam" with Aparna Harikumar and Vishnu Vijay.

As a playback singer, Harisankar has recorded extensively across four South Indian languages:

- Malayalam – His breakthrough came with Jeevamshamayi (Theevandi), a duet with Shreya Ghoshal. Other popular songs include Pavizha Mazhaye (Athiran), Hima Mazhayayai, Kamini (Anugraheethan Antony), Vaanam Chaayum (Anarkali), and Kiliye (ARM).
- Tamil – Debuted with Dhibu Ninan Thomas’s Pesadhe Mozhiye (with Chinmayi) and later collaborated with G. V. Prakash Kumar for Thalaivii.
- Kannada – Introduced by Nobin Paul in 777 Charlie, followed by Brahmakalasham and Oh Madhanamana Mohini in B. Ajaneesh Loknath’s Kantara: Chapter 1, and Nee Dhaare in Charan Raj’s Sapta Sagaradaache Ello – Side B.
- Telugu – Rendered the Malayalam version of Naatu Naatu from RRR

== Awards ==
2008

- Raaga Ratnam Juniors Carnatic Music Reality Show by Amrita TV Winner

2015

- Radio Mirchi Music Awards - Best Upcoming Singer

2016

- Asia Vision Awards - Best Playback Singer

2018

- Movie Street Award 2018 - Best Playback Singer
- M.S. Subbulakshmi Fellowship in Carnatic Music
- All India Radio (AIR) - A Grade Artist in Carnatic Music & Light Music

2019

- SIIMA Best Playback Singer Male
- Asianet Film Awards - Best Singer
- Mazhavil Music Awards - Best Singer
- Asiavision Awards - Best Playback Singer

2020

- Asianet Film Awards - Nominee in Best Singer

2021

- Mazhavil Music Awards - Best Singer
- Mazhavil Music Awards - Best Duet

2022

- Big Screen Award - Best Playback Singer

2023

- Kerala Film Critics Association Awards - Best Singer
- Vayalar Ramavarma Film Award - Best Singer
- Big Screen Award - Best Playback Singer
- IFF Award - Best Playback Singer of The Year
- Anand TV Awards - Best Playback Singer
- Vayalar Ramavarma Film Award - Best Playback Singer
- SIIMA - Best Playback Singer Male, Nominee (Malayalam & Kannada)

2024

- SIIMA Best Playback Singer Male
- Kerala Film Critics Association Awards - Best Singer
- Mazhavil Music Awards - Best Song of the Year (For Kiliye from ARM)

2025

- Flowers TV - Most Popular Singer (For Kiliye from ARM)
- SIIMA - Best Playback Singer Male (For Kiliye from ARM)
- Chettikulangara Puraskaaram
- Vayalar Ramavarma Sangeetha Puraskaaram
- Honesty Fame Award - Best Playback Singer
- Thikkurisi Film Award 2025 - Best Singer Male
- Mohammed Rafi Award by Pattukalude Koottukar
- P. Jayachandran Memorial Award - Varnam
- 55th Kerala State Film Awards - Best Male Singer
