= Haripad Murukadas =

Haripad V. Murukadas
- Born: Haripad V. Murukadas; 15 May 1971 (age 55); Haripad, Kerala
- Genre: Carnatic music
- Occupations: Academic, classical instrumentalist
- Instrument: Nadaswaram
- Years active: 1985-present

Haripad V. Murukadas (Malayalam: ഹരിപ്പാട് മുരുകദാസ് ) (born 15 May 1971) is an Indian carnatic musician in the wind instrument Nadaswaram. A disciple of Thiruvizha Jayashankar, he is also a music educator at Kshetra Kala Peetom in Vaikom.

== Early life and training ==
Born in Haripad, in Alappuzha district of Kerala, Murukadas learned the basics of nadaswaram from Haripad Chellappa Panicker and is now learning and performing under the guidance of Thiruvizha Jayashankar.

== Career ==
He is a graded-artist from All India Radio (AIR) Trivandrum and working as an instructor in Kshetra Kala Peetom, Vaikom. He performs in temple festivals and kutcheris in South Kerala.

=== Awards and recognition ===
- First Prize winner in Kerala School Kalolsavam (School Arts Festival of Kerala) from 1984 to 1986
- First Prize winner in Kerala University Youth Festival from 1987 to 1988
