= Mavelikkara Prabhakara Varma =

- Born: 1928
- Died: 2008 (aged 79–80)
- Genres: Carnatic
- Occupation: Singer

Mavelikkara Prabhakara Varma (1928–2008) was an Indian carnatic singer. and teacher who descended from the royal family of Mavelikkara, Kerala.

== Biography ==
He was born in 1928 as the second son of Chandraprabha Thamburatty (daughter of the great scholar A. R. Raja Raja Varma) and Rama Varma of Kilimanoor Palace. While in his mother's womb, Varma was affected by polio and thus was born with disorder in his right leg, which he had to carry till his death. After his initial studies, he joined the Swathi Thirunal Music Academy in Thiruvananthapuram and after the course, joined the academy as an assistant professor in 1957. He retired as the principal of RLV College of Music and Fine Arts, Tripunithura (1981–84).

He has many disciples, including the Carnatic vocalists Neyyatinkara Vasudevan, P R Kumarakerala Varma, K. Omanakutti, Mavelikkara P Subrahmanyam, Ponkunnam Ramachandran, Thamarakkad Govindan Namboothiri, Thamarakkad Krishnan Namboothiri, and Cheppad Vamanan Namboothiri.M. K. Sankaran Namboothiri,

He died on 2 November 2008, at his sister's home at Tripunithura near Ernakulam. He was aged 80. He remained a lifelong bachelor. He composed several krithis written by Thulasivanam many of which are popular and are sang by artists across the globe. He received the Kerala Sangeetha Nataka Akademi Award in 1985 and the Kerala government's Swathi Sangeetha Puraskaram in 2006.
