= Balabhaskar =

Indian musician

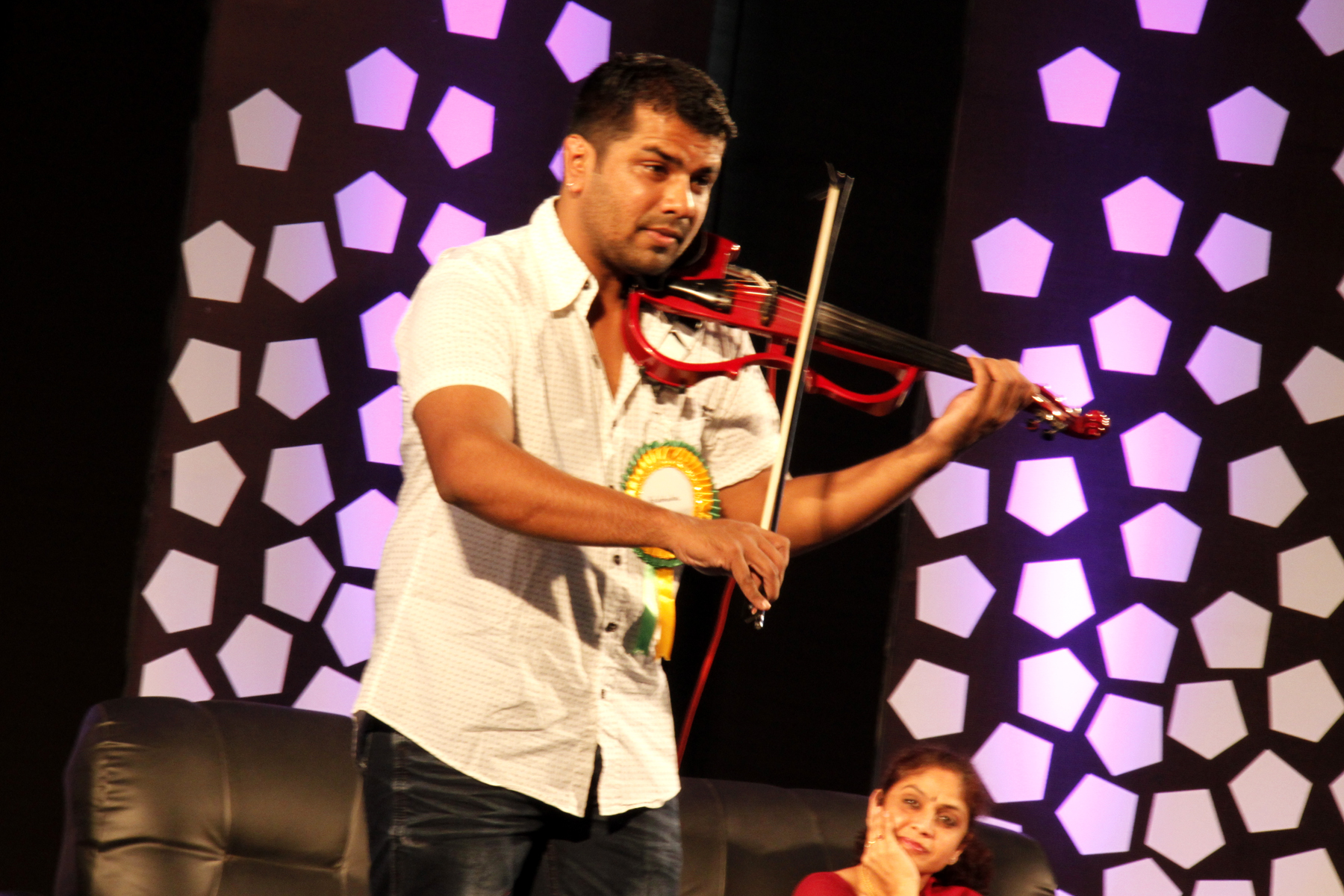

Background information
- Born: Balabhaskar Chandran; 10 July 1978
- Died: 2 October 2018 (aged 40) Thiruvananthapuram, Kerala, India
- Genres: Fusion, carnatic, world
- Occupations: Singer; Composer; Violinist; Record producer; Musician
- Years active: 1995–2018
- Website: balabhaskar.in

Balabhaskar Chandran (10 July 1978 – 2 October 2018) was an Indian musician, violinist, composer and record producer. He is best known for promoting fusion music in South India. Hailing from a musically affluent family, he was introduced to the world of instrumental music at the age of three by his uncle B. Sasikumar, a laureate in Carnatic music.

Balabhaskar began his professional career at the age of 12. He made his debut as a music director by composing the soundtrack for the Malayalam-language film Mangalya Pallakku (1998), and was the youngest music composer to have worked in the industry at the age of 17. He had won the Bismillah Khan Yuva Sangeetkaar Puraskaar in 2008 by Kendra Sangeet Natak Academy for Instrumental Music (Violin).

== Career ==
Balabhaskar was a child prodigy and started doing stage shows at 12. He became the youngest music director in the Malayalam film industry when he composed for the movie Mangalya Pallak (audio marketed by Magna Sound) at 17. His compositions for the albums Ninakaai and Aadyamai are still among the most-sought-after romantic song collections. He was exceptionally versed in Carnatic music and hence was an exponent of the same. His flair for connecting with his audience has made him one of the hot favorites for major stage shows and classical concerts.

Balabhaskar has performed with many noted musicians and instrumentalists in India and abroad, including Ustad Zakir Hussain, Sivamani, Louis Banks, Vikku Vinayakram, Fetty Wap, Hariharan, Mattannoor Sankarankutty, Ranjit Barot, Fazal Qureshi, and so on. He also performed with his guru and uncle Shri B. Sasikumar, as violin duo in Carnatic concerts.

== Latest works ==
Balabhaskar's debut instrumental fusion album was let it B in 2011. It features renowned musicians including Sivamani, Louis Banks, Fazal Qureshi, Gino Banks and Sheldon D'Silva. Let it B has flavors of rock, jazz, hip-hop and techno music spun around Balabhaskar's Indian violin. The album uses specially composed Sanskrit lyrics, in an effort to promote Sanskrit as a language of communication. Two songs, "Begin with Soorya" and "B yond," have been visualized and are available along with the visuals of the making in the limited edition series. The album is produced under the banner of MC Audios and Videos.

Balabhaskar brought out a collection of soothing Carnatic Keertanas colored in his style, lending it an international flavor. The project is called Bhajati in 2011 and is marketed by Audio Tracs.

== Personal life ==
Balabhaskar was born to C. K. Unni who was a postmaster and Santhakumari; a Sanskrit lecturer of Sree Swathi Thirunal College of Music on 10 July 1978. He was married to his longtime girlfriend Lakshmi on 18 November 2000. Their only daughter (who was born after 16 years of their marriage), Thejaswini Bala, born on 23 April 2016, died on 25 September 2018, aged 2 years 5 months old, when the family met with an accident in Pallipuram, near Thiruvananthapuram. Singer Madhu Balakrishnan is his first cousin.

== Death ==
Balabhaskar sustained multiple injuries due to a car accident which occurred at Pallippuram on the NH-66 in the early hours of 25 September 2018, which also injured his wife and killed their daughter, and was admitted to the Ananthapuri Hospital in Thiruvananthapuram, following which two surgeries were done. His condition was improving while continuing on life support, but he died suddenly of cardiac arrest on 2 October 2018.

Almost 22 months after his death, the Central Bureau of Investigation took up the probe, for which an FIR has now been lodged by the agency.

== Awards ==
Balabhaskar was the recipient of the Bismillah Khan Yuva Sangeetkaar Puraskaar in 2008 by Kendra Sangeet Natak Academy for Instrumental Music (Violin).

== Discography ==
Apart from his concerts and stage shows, Balabhaskar gave music to ad films, movies, tele-serial titles and albums in Malayalam, Hindi, Tamil, Telugu and Sanskrit languages.

Name	Year	Genre
Khwabon Ke Parinde	2016	Hindi Musical Album - The Big Band
Ambulance	2015	Short film
Zahir	2013	Malayalam Movie
Bhajati	2011	Carnatic Fusion
Let it B	2011	World Instrumental Fusion album - Sanskrit
Pattinde Palazhi	2010	Malayalam movie
Moksham	2005	Malayalam Movie
Heart Beats	2005	Malayalam Musical Album
Mazhayilaro	2005	Malayalam Musical Album
Panchajanyam	2004	Malayalam Movie
Vasantha Geethangal	2002	Malayalam Musical Album
Korappan the great	2001	Malayalam Movie
Kannadikkadavathu	2000	Malayalam Movie
Thakadhimitha	2000	Malayalam Musical Album
Adyamai	1999	Malayalam Musical Album
No Tension Pleeze	1999	Malayalam Musical Album - Confusion Band
Balyasmruthikalay Onam	1998	Malayalam Musical Album
Ninakkayi	1998	Malayalam Musical Album
Neeyariyan	1998	Malayalam Musical Album - Confusion Band
Mangalya Pallakku	1997	Malayalam movie
