= Sabareesh Prabhaker =

- Born: 5 August 1989 (age 37) (India) Thrippunithura, Ernakulam district, Kerala
- Genres: Fusion, Carnatic, World
- Occupation: Violinist
- Instrument: Violin
- Years active: 2001-present

Sabareesh Prabhaker (born 5 August 1989) is an Indian violinist. He comes from the musical family of the Cherthala sisters (Malayalam drama artists), his grandmother Janaki being one of the six.

== Early life ==
Sabareesh was born in a musical family as one of the grandson of late Janaki of Cherthala Sisters. He is born on 5 August 1989 to Chandrasekharan Pillai & Vanaja Chandrasekhar.He studied vocal music under Tomy Thomas, P.Subramaniam and got trained violin under T. M. Abdul Hazeez at the age of 5. He completed BA in music (vocal) at Maharaja's College, Ernakulam and did MA in violin at RLV College of Music and Fine Arts securing first rank. He had initially joined the Trichur Engineering college for under graduation studies, but dropped it. While at school he secured 1st prize thrice in CBSE youth festival in violin in consecutive years. While at college, he was 3 times winner at Mahatma Gandhi University inter-university arts festival and he was one of the rare south Indians who became the inter-university national winner in violin. Recognizing his skills and qualifications, Mahatma Gandhi University granted him a special permission to do PG in violin and he also acquired a scholarship in the field of violin as a carnatic (instrument) by Ministry of Culture (India).

== Career ==
He began his professional career at the age of 12. In early 2016 a cover album, created by his band Immortal Raaga was recognised by the BBC in the Radio Play category. The technical beauty of A. R. Rahman’s music and the consummate beauty of Ilaiyaraaja’s compositions are his ultimate experiences. He was invited to team up with percussionists Sivamani and Mattannoor Sankarankutty Marar. He also played along with Alappuzha Karunamurthy.
