= Mangalya Pallakku =

- CD Cover of Mangalya Pallakku
- Directed by: Vinod Roshan
- Screenplay by: Sathyanath; Dialogue : Sathyanath
- Based on: Story by Vinod Roshan
- Starring: Sreenivasan; Jagadish; Kasthuri
- Music by: Balabhaskar; Rajamani
- Release date: 1 January 1998
- Country: India
- Language: Malayalam

Mangalya Pallakku (Mal:മംഗല്യ പല്ലക്ക്, English Translation: Wedding-Sedan) is a Malayalam language comedy film released in January 1998, starring Sreenivasan, Jagadish and Kasthuri. The film was directed by Vinod Roshan. Sathyanath wrote the dialogue for the film. M. G. Sreekumar did partial discography for the film. Balabhaskar was the youngest composer in Malayalam cinema at the time (aged 17).

== Plot ==
Mukundan is looking for a bride. He meets Seethalakshmi and likes her. However, he is threatened by Raghavan, who wishes to marry Seethalakshmi. Despite this, Mukundan and Seethalakshmi get married.

== Cast ==
- Sreenivasan as Mukundan
- Jagadish as Govindankutty
- Kasthuri as Seethalakshmi
- Rajashree as Gayathri
- Jagathy Sreekumar as Sankara Variyar
- Cochin Haneefa as Raghavan
- Tony as Prem Mohan
- Kozhikode Narayanan Nair as Sukumaran Nair
- Salim Kumar as Phalgunan
- Kalabhavan Rahman as Panicker
- Santhakumari as Seethalakshmi's mother
- Biju Menon as Dinesh
