= Swathi Sangeetha Puraskaram =

- Civilian award for contributions to music
- Sponsored by: Government of Kerala
- First award: 1997
- Final award: 2021

Swathi Sangeetha Puraskaram is the highest honour for musicians instituted by the Kerala State Government. It's named after Swathi Thirunal Rama Varma, the Maharaja of Travancore (തിരുവിതാംകൂര്‍), in India. The award carries a cash prize of 0.1 million rupees, a citation and a medal.

== Complete List of Recipients ==
S.No	Name	Image	Birth / death	Awarded	Notes	Ref(s)
1.	Semmangudi Srinivasa Iyer		1908–2003	1997	Carnatic musician	
2.	Ustad Bismillah Khan		1916–2006	1998	Shehnai maestro	
3.	D. K. Pattammal		1919–2009	1999	Carnatic musician and playback singer	
4.	K. V. Narayanaswamy		1923–2002	2000	Carnatic music violinist	
5.	T. N. Krishnan		b 1928 - 2020	2002	Carnatic music violinist	
6.	Bhimsen Joshi		1922-2011	2003	Hindustani classical music	
7.	Sankaran Embranthiri		1944-2007	2004	Kathakali music	
8.	Mavelikkara Prabhakara Varma		1928-2008	2006	Carnatic music vocalist	
9.	Neyyattinkara Vasudevan		1940–2008	2007	Carnatic music vocalist	
10	Jasraj		1930-2020	2008	Hindustani vocalist	
11.	R. K. Srikantan			2009	Carnatic music vocalist	
12.	K. J. Yesudas		1940-	2010	playback singer, carnatic music vocalist	
13.	M. Balamuralikrishna		1930-2016	2012	Carnatic music vocalist	
14.	V. Dakshinamoorthy		1919-2013	2013	Carnatic music vocalist and Music director	
15.	Amjad Ali Khan		1945-	2014	sarod player	
16.	Trichur V. Ramachandran		1940-	2015	carnatic music vocalist	
17.	Mangad K. Natesan			2016	carnatic music	
18.	L. Subramaniam		1947-	2017	Carnatic music, Violinist	
19.	Pala C. K. Ramachandran			2018	Carnatic musician	
20.	T. M. Krishna		1976-	2019	Carnatic music vocalist	
21.	K. Omanakutty		1943-	2020	Carnatic music vocalist	
22.	P. R. Kumara Kerala Varma			2021	Carnatic music vocalist	
