= RLV College of Music and Fine Arts =

Academic institution in Kerala, India

Coordinates: 9°56′33.06″N 76°18′35.83″E

- Type: Public
- Established: Radha Lakshmi Vilasam Academy of Music (1936); RLV Academy of Music and Institution of Fine Arts (1956); RLV College of Music and Fine Arts (1997)
- Principal: Prof. R Rajalakshmi
- Location: Thrippunithura, Kochi
- Website: rlvcollege.ac.in

RLV College of Music and Fine Arts is an academic institution situated in Thripunithura, Kochi in the state of Kerala, India. It is affiliated to the Mahatma Gandhi University and offers graduate and postgraduate courses in music, performing arts and visual arts. The current principal is Prof. C. J. Suseela

== History ==
The college began in a single apartment belonging to the Cochin Royal family.

The then King of Cochin, Kerala Varma Midukkan Thampuran and his wife Lakshmikutty Nethyaramma invited experts in stitching, Kaikottikkali, and painting to impart learning to girls and elder ladies. This endeavor developed into an institution in the name of the King’s daughter Radha and wife Lakshmi and was named Radha Lakshmi Vilasam Academy incorporating vocal music also.

In 1956, the institution was brought under the control of the Government of Kerala and was renamed as RLV Academy of Music and Fine Arts. Diploma and Post Diploma Courses in vocal music, Bharatanatyam, Kathakali, and painting were started.

In 1998, the institution was affiliated to the Mahatma Gandhi University, Kerala at Kottayam. The Diploma and Post Diploma Courses were restructured as degree and postgraduate courses.

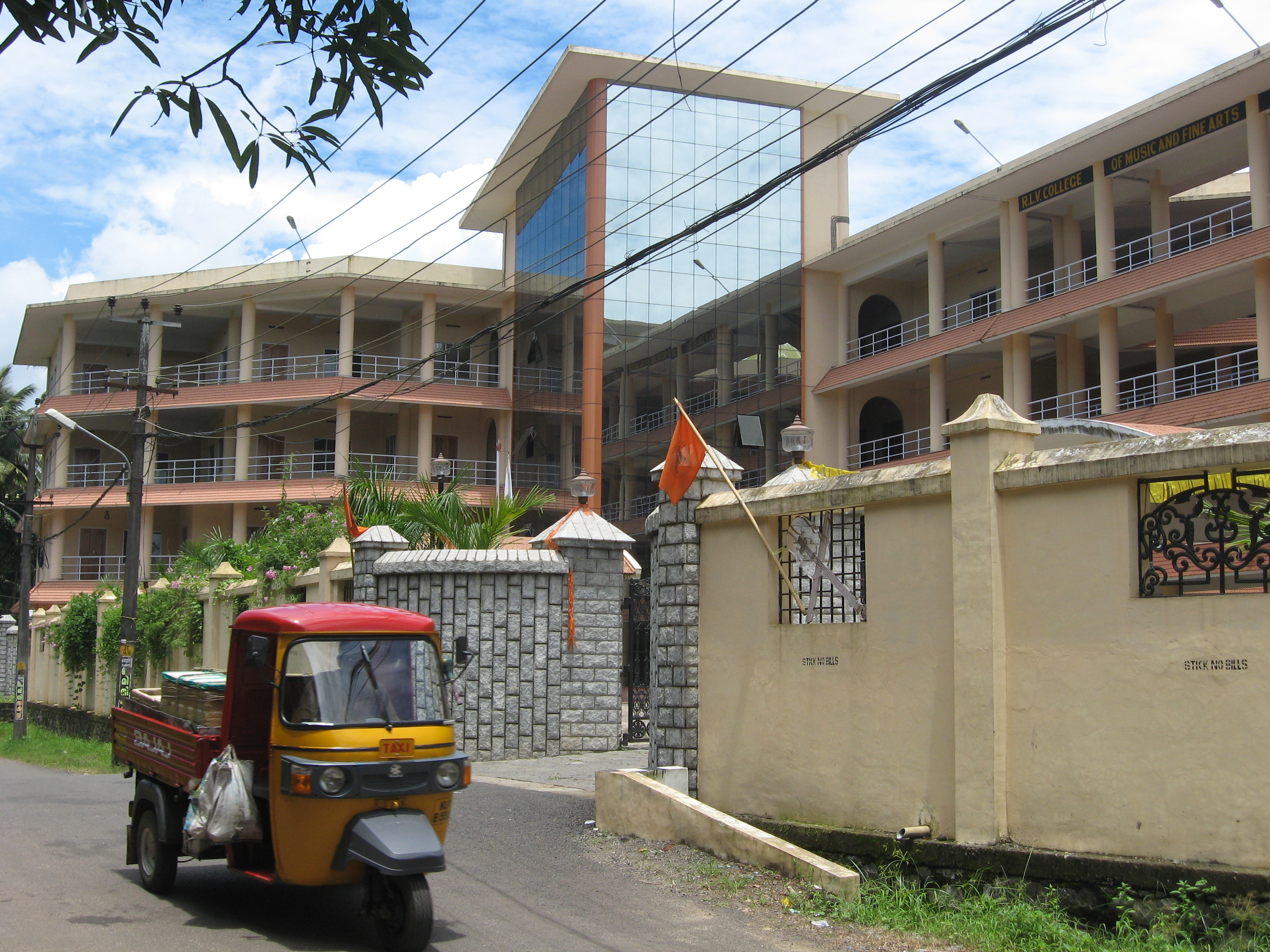
Campus

== Faculties and departments ==
=== Faculty of Music ===
- Department of Vocal
- Department of Veena
- Department of Violin
- Department of Mridangam

=== Faculty of Performing Arts ===
- Department of Bharatanatyam
- Department of Mohiniyattam
- Department of Kathakali Vesham
- Department of Kathakali Sangeetham
- Department of Chenda
- Department of Maddalam

=== Faculty of Visual Arts ===
- Department of Painting
- Department of Sculpture
- Department of Applied Arts

== Courses ==
- Bachelor of Arts - Music and Performing Arts
- Master of Arts - Music and Performing Arts
- Bachelor of Fine Arts - Visual Arts
- Master of Fine Arts - Visual Arts

== Notable alumni ==
- K. J. Yesudas
- Thiruvizha Jayashankar
- Thonnakkal Peethambaran
- Mayyanad Kesavan Namboodiri
- Binoy Varghese
- Vaikom Valliammal
- Vaikom Vasudevan Namboothiri
- Haripad K. P. N. Pillai
- Seema G. Nair
- Gowry Lekshmi
- Sabareesh Prabhaker
- RLV Ramakrishnan
- Minmini
- Blesson Thomas

== Principals ==
- N.V.Narayana Bhagavathar 1956-57
- K.S.Kumaraswamy Iyer 1957-66
- K.S.Harihara Iyer 1966-68
- Nellai T.V.Krishnamoorthy 1969-70
- Parassala B.Ponnammal 1970-80
- Mavelikkara R.Prabhakara Varma 1981-84
- Smt. S. Janaki 1984-85
- T.P.Moni Iyer1985-86
- K.K.Dharmarajan 1986-88
- P. Leela 1988-94
- V.I.Suku 1994-96
- Avaneeswaram Ramachandran 1996-98
- Tripunithura K.Lalitha 2000-02
- P.S.Vanajam 2002-2009
- R.Kamakshi 2009-12
- Prof M.Balasubramoniam (2012- 2014)
- Dr K.S.Jays (2014-2015)
- Prof T.N.Govindan Namboothiri (2015 -
- Prof. Chalakkudy V.K.Ramesan

"Welcome to RLV College of Music and Fine Arts, Tripunithura". Rlvmusiccollege.org.
