= M. K. Sankaran Namboothiri =

Sankaran Namboothiri
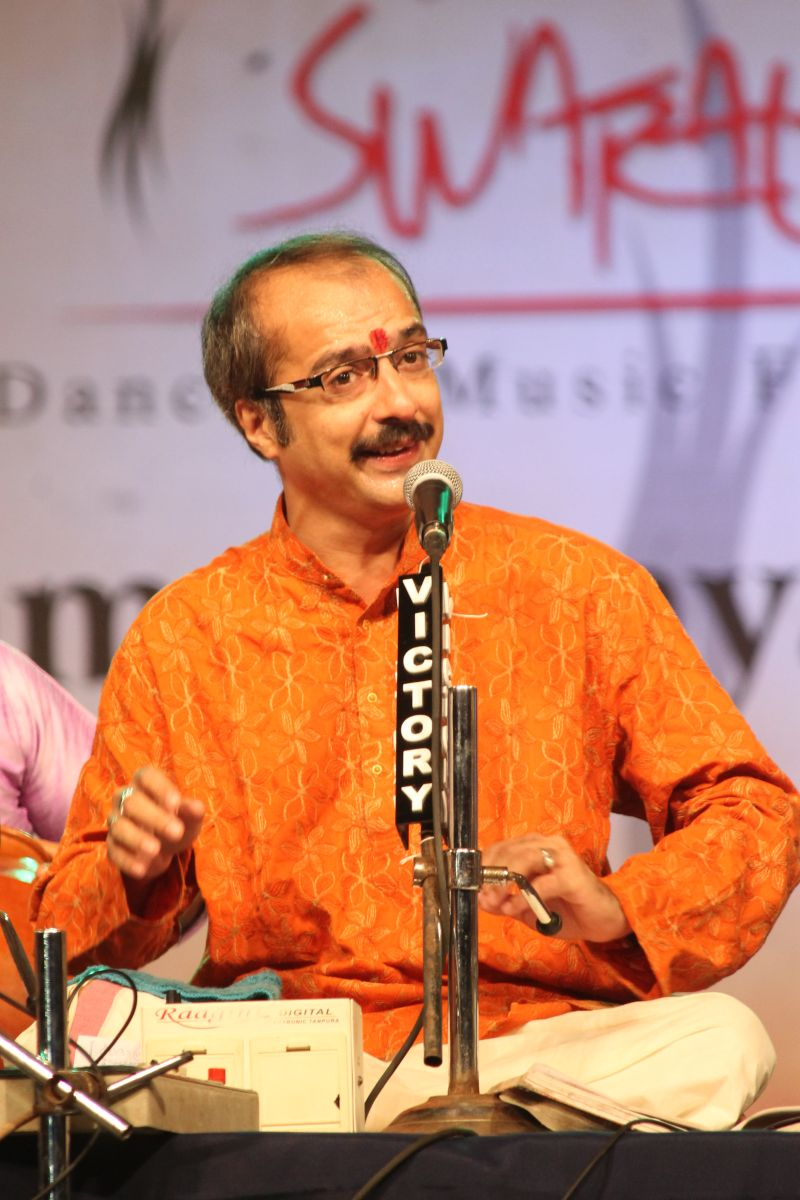
- Sankaran Namboothiri during music concert in New York

Background information
- Born: 23 April 1971 (age 54); Punnayam, Perumbavoor, Ernakulam district, Kerala, India
- Origin: Kochi, Kerala, India
- Genres: Indian classical music and Playback singing
- Occupation: Singer
- Years active: 1980–present

M. K. Sankaran Namboothiri (a.k.a. Pranavam Sankaran Namboothiri) (born 1971) is a Carnatic classical music vocalist and playback singer from Kerala. He is the youngest A Top grade vocalist with All India Radio. Renowned as a child prodigy, he started learning music at the age of ten under the tutelage of C. S. Narayanan Namboothiri. He later trained under T. V. Gopalakrishnan, Mavelikkara Prabhakara Varma, and K. V. Narayanaswamy.

He has conducted concerts in India as well as many foreign countries.

== Personal life ==
Sankaran Namboothiri was born to Krishnan Namboothiri (Kathakali singer) and Adithi Devi Antharjanom (Madom Illam, Punnayam) in the year 1971. His native place is 'Punnayam' (asamannoor village). He has two elder brothers, Krishnan Namboothiri (Retired Deputy Tahasildar, perumbavoor) and Narayanan Namboothiri (college lecturer VTB college, Palakkad)

He is married to Ms. Smitha Shankaran from Cherthala and they have a child named Sangeeth Krishnan. Currently lives in Vennala, Cochin.

== Awards ==
- Kerala Sangeetha Nataka Akademi Award (2013)
- Isai – Pulamai Selvan by Lions Club International, Madras in 1984
- Kala Prathibha by M G University, Kerala in 1987
- Ganamrutha Surabi by Sree Vidya Peedam Kaladaikurichi, Tirunelveli, Tamil Nadu
- Isai Mamani by Harinagar Tamil Association, New Delhi in 1990
- Yuvakala Bharathi by Bharath Kalachar, Chennai in 1995
- Lifetime achievement award by United Writers' Association, Chennai in 2000
- Thulasivana Puraskar by Thulasivana Sangeetha Parishath, 2000
- Best Play Back Singer Award from Gandhi Study Center, Doordarshan Kendra and Raagom Cultural Center in 2008 for the song "Chittattinkaavil" from the film "Nivedyam"

== Film songs ==
Year	Song	Film	Music director
2006	Kathakali Patham	Vadakkumnathan	Raveendran
2006	Chakani Raja	Madhuchandralekha	M Jayachandran
2007	Azhakaarnna	Kanakasimhasanam	M Jayachandran
2007	Chittattin Kaavil	Nivedyam	M Jayachandran
2007	Pal Kadalil	Romeo	Alex Paul
2008	Vidhiyil	Swarnam	Mohan Sithara

== Malayalam Album Songs ==
- Pranayamarmaram – 2009.
- Bhagwan Sri Sathya Sai Sapthathi – 2008.
- Jai Jai Bhairavi Carnatic Krithis – 2008.
