= B. Sasikumar =

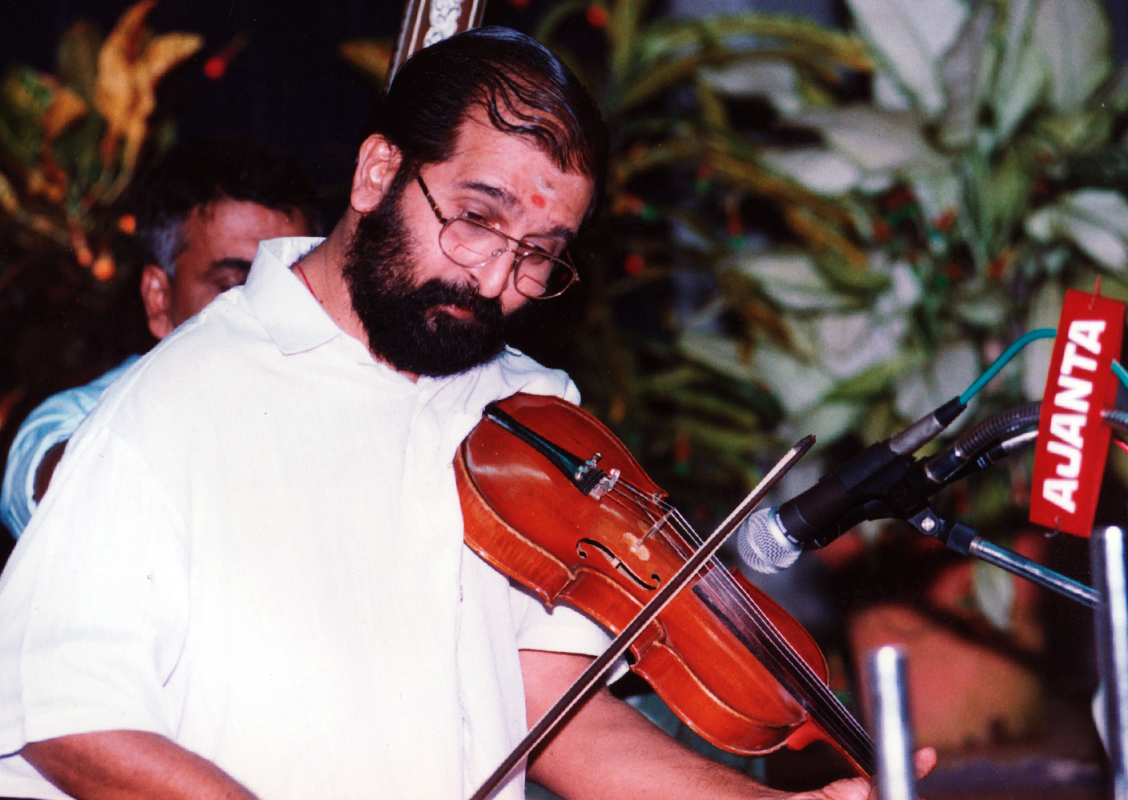
- B. Sasikumar in concert in 2001

Background information
- Born: 27 April 1949; Thiruvalla, Travancore, India
- Died: 25 November 2023 (aged 74) Jagathy, Thiruvananthapuram, Kerala, India
- Genre: Carnatic music
- Occupations: Violinist, Musician, Teacher, Composer and Writer
- Instrument: Violin
- Years active: 1967–2023
- Website: www.bsasikumar.in

B. Sasikumar (27 April 1949 – 25 November 2023) was an Indian Carnatic music violinist, musician, teacher, composer and writer from Thiruvananthapuram, Kerala.

== Biography ==
B. Sasikumar was born on 27 April 1949 in Thiruvalla, to M. K. Bhaskara Panicker and G. Sarojini Amma. Family then moved to Thiruvananthapuram.

Sasikumar started his basic lessons in music from his father, who was a Nadaswaram maestro, musician and composer (also known as Kochu Kuttappan of the Thiruvalla Brothers). Later he joined the Swati Thirunal College of Music, Trivandrum, Kerala, and took his Ganapraveena degree in music with Violin main, when noted violinist Chalakkudy Narayana Swamy was heading the department.

Sasikumar started his career as a lecturer at Swati Thirunal College of Music in 1967. He later joined All India Radio, Trivandrum, as staff artiste (Violin) in 1971 and retired in 2009. He has written dramas and composed Malayalam and Tamil kirtans for All India Radio.

B. Sasikumar has accompanied with his violin many legends in Indian music, like Chembai Vaidyanatha Bhagavathar 0:20 / 15:22 Ksheera sagara sayana by Shri Chembai Vaidhyanatha Bhagavathar | K J Yesudas | B .Sasikumar, Semmangudi Srinivasa Iyer, D. K. Jayaraman, D. K. Pattammal, M. D. Ramanathan, K. V. Narayanaswamy KVN Janmasathabdi/Palakkad KV Narayanaswamy, B Sasikumar, Palakkad Suresh, Udupi Sridhar-TVM 09/05/1992, Alathur Brothers, Seerkazhi Govindarajan, M. Balamurali Krishna 01 PANCHAMATHANGA_DR BALAMURALIKRISHNA B SASIKUMAR, Viola-Violin BMK- BSK, T. V. Sankaranarayanan, Madurai T. N. Seshagopalan, T. K. Govinda Rao, Puthukode Krishnamurthy Pudukode Krishnamoorthy B Sasikumar Mavelikara Velukutty Nair AIR C Converted K. J. Yesudas, N. Ramani (flute), S. Balachander and Chitti Babu (veena) and so on. He has also accompanied various jugalbandi concerts of musical giants Pandit Jasraj and Dr. M. Balamuralikrishna in Delhi and Madras.

As an A grade artiste at AIR, he has been part of numerous concerts and musical programmes. He has produced many musical features for AIR such as "Nadopasana", "Sapthaswarangalil" and "Layicha Mahaanubhaavan" - both on Saint Thyagaraja, "Ganesha prabhaavam" - on Shri. Muthuswamy Dikshithar, "Swathi Pranam" and "Bhavayami Raghuramam" - on Maharaja Swati Thirunal. "Navavarana Krithimahima" was a 10 episode series on Navavarana krithis. He has also directed Adhyathma Ramayanam recital in 2001. His musical features "Gurussaakshaathparabrahma", "Madhavamanavam", "Kaveri", "Sanghagaanam", and "Karnaki" have won National Annual Awards from All India Radio. He still continues contributing lyrics for light songs, conducts and composes songs, composes and arranges musical features, writes dramas and skits for a noted feature of AIR, the "Kandathum Kettathum". His dramas are noted for their classic humour and wit. Some of the famous creations are "Ittaavattatthil Oru Natakam", "Sishyan", "Enikkente Veettil Ponam", "Santhivilla", "Pishukkan", "Paavam Maveli", "Katthivesham Paappukutty Asan", "Amma" (theme from the epic), and "Akam Porul".

He has composed and presented an orchestral piece called "String", consisting of only string instruments, with young artistes for the AIR programme.

Sasikumar is one of the senior most Gurus in Carnatic music and has a number of students all over the music field. His unique style of pedagogy and mentorship is highly regarded among musicians and music learners. His nephew cum violinist Late Balabhaskar, G. Venugopal, Kavalam Srikumar, Kallara Gopan, Vidhu Prathap, Kavalam Sajeev, Attukal Balasubrahmanyam, Dr. Rajkumar (Flute), Soundarrajan (Veena)and Mavelikara Satheesh chandran(violin) are a few of his students. He has also presented and directed an orchestra, "Vadyatharangam", which is a carnatic symphony using a variety of string, wind and percussion instruments. He has released many CDs and cassettes, most of them being devotional songs. He is a noted composer, composing krithis under the name Chandrapothar, which is a Sanskrit synonym for Sasikumar. He has more than 100 compositions to his credit, including many pallavis, Malayalam, Tamil and Sanskrit keerthanams. He has also introduced new Talas, such as "Chathurangam".

Sasikumar died at his residence in Jagathy, Thiruvananthapuram on 25 November 2023, at the age of 74.

== Recognition and awards ==
- Sangeet Natak Akademi Award – 2008
- Kerala Sangeetha Nataka Akademi Fellowship – 2001
- Sindooram Cultural Award – 1999
- Trissur Youth Cultural Centre Award – 1997
- Bhasha Sahitya Parishat Award – 1990
- Violin Samrat Award From Kuwait – 2011

== Sources ==
- TM Dance Academy
- Bhasabharathi
