= M. G. Radhakrishnan =

M.G. Radhakrishnan
- M.G. Radhakrishnan

Background information
- Born: Malabar Gopalan Radhakrishnan; 29 July 1940; Haripad, Travancore, British India
- Died: 2 July 2010 (aged 69) Thiruvananthapuram, Kerala, India
- Genres: Music Director; Carnatic music Composer
- Occupation: Music Director
- Years active: 1978–2010

Malabar Gopalan Nair Radhakrishnan (29 July 1940 – 2 July 2010) was an Indian music director and Carnatic vocalist from Kerala.

== Personal life ==
M. G. Radhakrishnan was born on 29 July 1940 at Haripad, in Alappuzha district, Kerala as the eldest of three children of music composer and harmonist Malabar Gopalan Nair and Harikatha exponent Kamalakshi marasyar. He studied at the S. D. College, Alappuzha, and undertook Ganabhooshanam from Swathi Thirunal College of Music. K. J. Yesudas was one of his classmates there. His younger brother M. G. Sreekumar is a playback singer in Malayalam and Tamil cinema and his younger sister K. Omanakutty is a Carnatic vocalist and academic.

Radhakrishnan was married to Padmaja, who was herself famous as a poet, lyricist and classical dancer. They had two children - M. R. Rajakrishnan and Karthika. Their son Rajakrishnan is a well-known sound recordist, who has worked in many films. Radhakrishnan died on 2 July 2010 at KIMS hospital in Thiruvananthapuram due to liver disease, less than a month short of his 70th birthday.

== Career ==
M. G. Radhakrishnan was a disciple of Sree Vidyadhiraja Hridayanjali, an Indian ascetic, and composed music for the ascetic's lyrics, which was sung by his younger sister K. Omanakutty, a Carnatic vocalist. In his official capacity, Radhakrishnan worked as staff and become the senior music composer (Grade 1) in Akashvani, Trivandrum. In 1962, he joined All India Radio as a music composer. He used to conduct a 15-minute light music class through AIR.

He also composed the poems of Kamala Surayya, an Indian writer, through the album Surayya Padunnu. Radhakrishnan introduced K. S. Chithra, a singer and a student of Omanakutty, to the film and music industry by employing her in the film Attahaasam.

== Death ==
Radhakrishnan died from liver cirrhosis on 2 July 2010 at Cosmopolitan Hospital in Thiruvananthapuram. He was admitted there a week earlier after his condition worsened, and had been on a ventilator since then. He was less than a month short of his 70th birthday when he died. He was cremated with full state honours at Thaikkad Santhikavadam electronic crematorium the following day. He is survived by his son Rajakrishnan, daughter Karthika, granddaughters Nandana and Gouriparvathy, sister Omanakutty and brother Sreekumar. His wife Padmaja, who outlived him by nearly ten years, died on 15 June 2020 following a heart attack.

== Awards ==
=== Kerala State Film Awards ===
- 2005 – Best Music Director – Ananthabadram
- 2001 – Best Music Director – Achaneyaanenikkishtam

=== Asianet Film Awards ===
- 2005 – Best Music Director Award – Anandabhadram
- 2001 – Best Music Director Award – Kaate Vannu Vilichappol

=== Others ===
- 2004 – Kerala Sangeetha Nataka Akademi Fellowship
- 1995 – Kerala Sangeetha Nataka Akademi Award

== Filmography ==
#	Film	Film director	Year
1	Thampu	G Aravindan	1978
2	Thiranottam	Ashok Kumar	1978
3	Thakara	Bharathan	1980
4	Aaravam	Bharathan	1980
5	Chamaram	Bharathan	1980
6	Njan Ekananu	P Chandrasekhar	1982
7	Poochakkoru Mookkuthi	Priyadarshan	1984
8	Parayanumvayya Parayathirikkanumvayya	Priyadarshan	1985
9	Rakkuyilin Ragasadassil	Priyadarshan	1986
10	Ayalvasi Oru Daridravasi	Priyadarshan	1986
11	Geetham	Sajan	1986
12	Sarvakalashala	Venu Nagavally	1987
13	Jaalakam	Harikumar	1987
14	Nombarathi Poovu	Padmarajan	1987
15	Vellanakalude Nadu	Priyadarshan	1988
16	Adhwaytham	Priyadarshan	
17	Oohakachavadam"	K. Madhu	1992
18	Manichithrathazhu	Fazil	1993
19	Devaasuram	I. V. Sasi	1993
20	Ammayane Sathyam	Balachandra Menon	1993
21	Kashmeeram	Rajiv Anchal	1994
22	Agnidevan	Venu Nagavally	1995
23	Thakshashila	Sreekumar Krishnan Nair	1995
24	Rakthasakshikal Sindabad	Venu Nagavally	1998
25	Stalin Sivadas	T S Suresh Babu	1999
26	Kannezhuthi Pottum Thottu	T. K. Rajeev Kumar	1999
27	Pilots	Rajiv Anchal	2000
28	Narasimham	Shaji Kailas	2000
29	Praja	Joshi	2001
30	Meghasandesham	Rajasenan	2001
31	Nariman	K. Madhu	2002
32	"Kattu Vannu Vilichappol"	Sasi Paravoor	2003
32	Achaneyanenikkishtam	Suresh Krishna	2004
33	Yanam	Sanjay Nambiar	2005
34	Ananthabhadram	Santhosh Sivan	2006
