= K. Omanakutty =

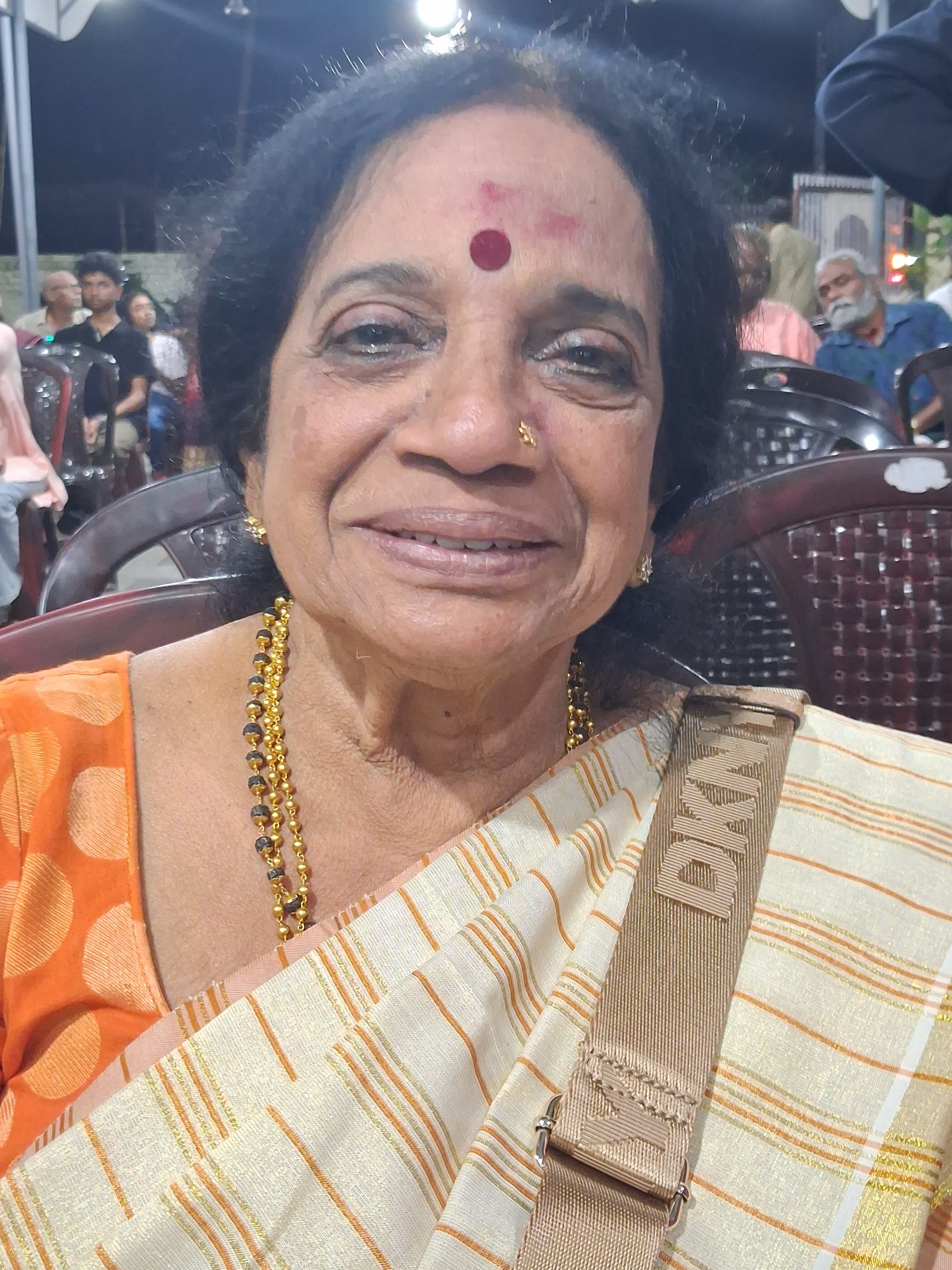
- K. Omanakutty
- Born: 24 May 1943 (age 83)
- Education: Swathi Thirunal College of Music, Thiruvananthapuram
- Occupations: Singer; college professor
- Relatives: M. G. Radhakrishnan (brother); M. G. Sreekumar (brother); M. R. Rajakrishnan (nephew); K. S. Harisankar (grandson)
- Musical career
- Genres: Indian classical; Carnatic
- Instrument: Vocals

Kamalakshi Omanakutty (born 1943), commonly known as K. Omanakutty or Dr. K. Omanakutty, is an Indian Carnatic vocalist, music educator, academic, and researcher. She is renowned for her contributions to Carnatic music through performances, teaching, and scholarly work, particularly her doctoral research on the origin and evolution of Kathakali music.

Omanakutty serves as a professor and former Head of the Department of Music at the University of Kerala. She is the founder, chairperson, and secretary of Sangeeta Bharati, a Thiruvananthapuram-based institution dedicated to music education, research, and the promotion of young talent, including initiatives in music therapy. She has also been associated with the Music Therapy Department at Pankaja Kasthuri Ayurvedic Medical College in Kattakada, Thiruvananthapuram, as a senior faculty member.

A prominent guru in Carnatic music, her notable disciples include vocalists such as K. S. Chithra, B. Arundhathi, K. S. Harisankar, Manjari, and K. S. Resmi.

Born into a family of musicians in Kerala, she is the elder sister of music director M. G. Radhakrishnan and playback singer M. G. Sreekumar. For her lifetime contributions to Carnatic music, education, and research, she has received several honors, including the Padma Shri award in 2025.

== Early life and education ==
K. Omanakutty was born in the year 1943 near Haripad in Kerala. She was born into a family of musicians. Her father, Malabar Gopalan Nair, was a harmonium player and Carnatic musician, who was a regular presence in stage shows across South India. Her mother, Medayil Kamalakshi marasyar, was also a Carnatic musician. Her brother M. G. Radhakrishnan, three years elder than her, was a composer and another brother M. G. Sreekumar, 14 years younger to her, is both a composer and playback singer.

She had her formal education at a school in her village. Later in 1963, she completed her graduation in Zoology from a degree college affiliated with Kerala University. Due to her interest in music, she joined the Thiruvananthapuram-based Music Academy to pursue a Gana Praveena course in Music. On successfully completing the course in Music from that organization, Omanakutty Amma started working as a lecturer in the Music Department of Government Maharaja's College for Women in Thiruvananthapuram. While working in the Music department of the college, she completed her part-time degree course in Music. After successfully completing the degree course in Music, Omanakutty became a Second Grade Professor in the same department of the college. In this designation, she continued to teach students of the department with dedication for a period of 6 years.

In recognition of the quality services provided by her in academics and music field, Omanakutty was promoted to the designation of the First Grade Professor of Music in the same department. During this period, many reputed musicians of today joined the course and successfully completed their formal training in Music from the department. Subsequently, she did her post-graduation and doctoral programs in the field of Music from the same department successfully. For her doctoral degree program, the subject of her research was the origin and the evolution of Kathakali music in Kerala.

Degrees:

- Ph.D. (Origin and the Evolution of Kathakali Music), University of Kerala
- M.A. (Music), University of Kerala, 1st Rank
- B.A. (Music), University of Kerala, 1st Rank
- Ganapraveena, Swati Tirunal College of Music, Thiruvananthapuram, Kerala
- B.Sc.(Zoology), University of Kerala.

== Career ==
=== Musician ===
While working as a senior faculty of Music at Government College for Women, the septuagenarian regularly took part in music concerts in different parts of the country. While preparing for the concerts, Omanakutty came across the works of the composer-musician king Swathi Thirunal. That point in time, many of his works were lying in oblivion. With the help of her disciples, she painstakingly analyzed his works and put them to make them presentable to the present-day audience. Later, she and her disciples started using Swathi Thirunal's compositions in their concerts to popularize them. One such discovery that was made during this period was a work on Tillana, a composition created by Swathi Thirunal.

During her later years as a musician, she realised the effect of music on the psyche of human beings and other animals. After having read the resources available on the topic, she decided to devote her remaining time on this unexplored field of music. For serving this purpose, she established an organization called Sangeeta Bharati. Apart from doing research on Music Therapy, it also provides authentic music training to the budding musicians of the state. In recognition of her service in the upcoming field of Music Therapy, the authorities of Panakaja Kasthuri Ayurvedic Medical College in Thiruvananthapurm have made her the senior-most faculty in the organization to assist them in administering the medical cure through music.

K. Omanakutty has performed more than 300 music concerts, exclusively of Swathi Thirunal kritis, as part of popularizing the Maharaja's compositions across the world. To this effect, Swathi Pancharatnam has performed by 500 students from Thiruvananthapuram district at Vyloppilly Sanskriti Bhavan in December 2015 with a focus to penetrate Maharaja's pancharatna kritis like that of Tyagaraja's Pancharatna Kriti.

Now, under the social justice department of Government of Kerala, music therapy is applying to the inmates of Poojapura and Pulayanarkotta old age homes for the mental solace of the inmates staying there in every month.

=== Academia ===
Omanakutty has teaching experience for 37 years as Lecturer and Professor in music. She retired from service in 2003 as professor and Head of Department of Music [HOD] from the Department of Music, University of Kerala. She was the first professor in Department of Music, University of Kerala.

== Personal life ==
Her husband M. P. Gopinathan Nair was a chief engineer of All India Radio. Her only daughter Kamala Lekshmi and son-in-law K. S. Sreekumar are also musicians. Omanakutty's grandchildren, K. S. Harisankar is a playback singer and K. S. Ravisankar is a violinist.

== Awards ==
- 1997 – Kerala Sangeetha Nataka Akademi Award (Classical Music)
- 2012 – Kerala Sangeetha Nataka Akademi Fellowship (Classical Music)
- 2013 – Subbulakshmi Award
- 2020 – Swathi Sangeetha Puraskaram
- 2025 - Padma Shri

== Gallery ==
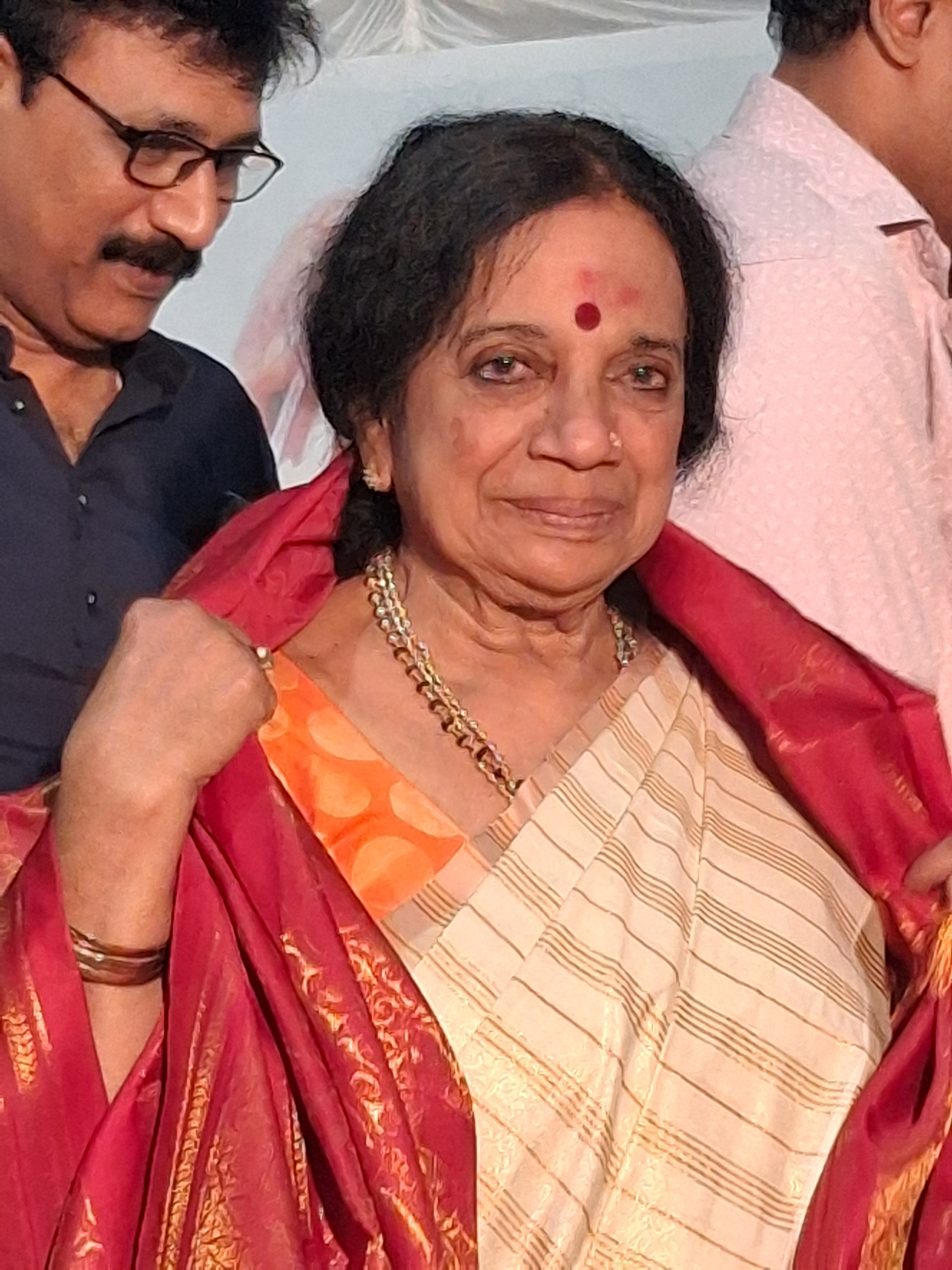
K. Omanakutty at Kollam 2025

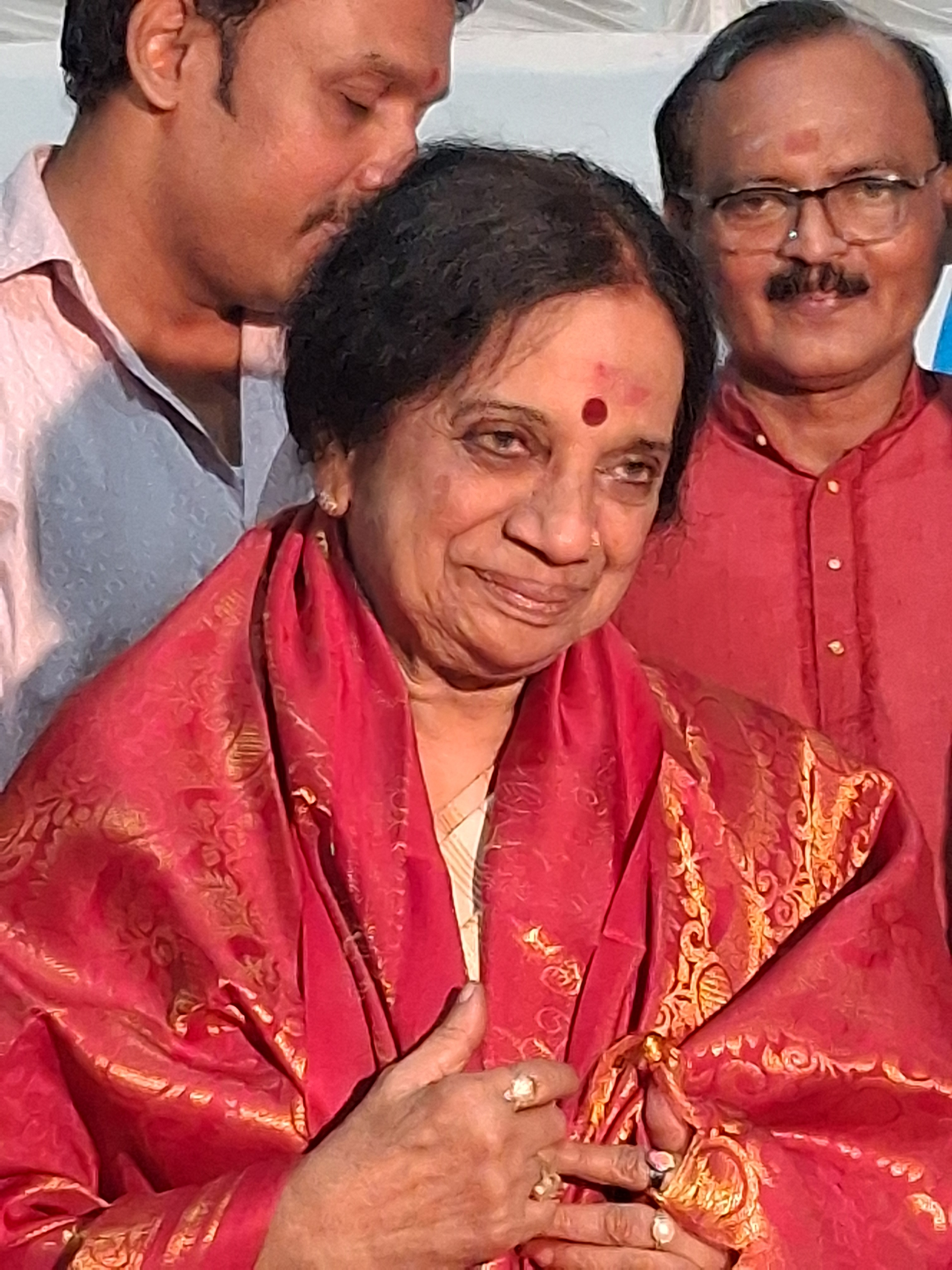
K. Omanakutty

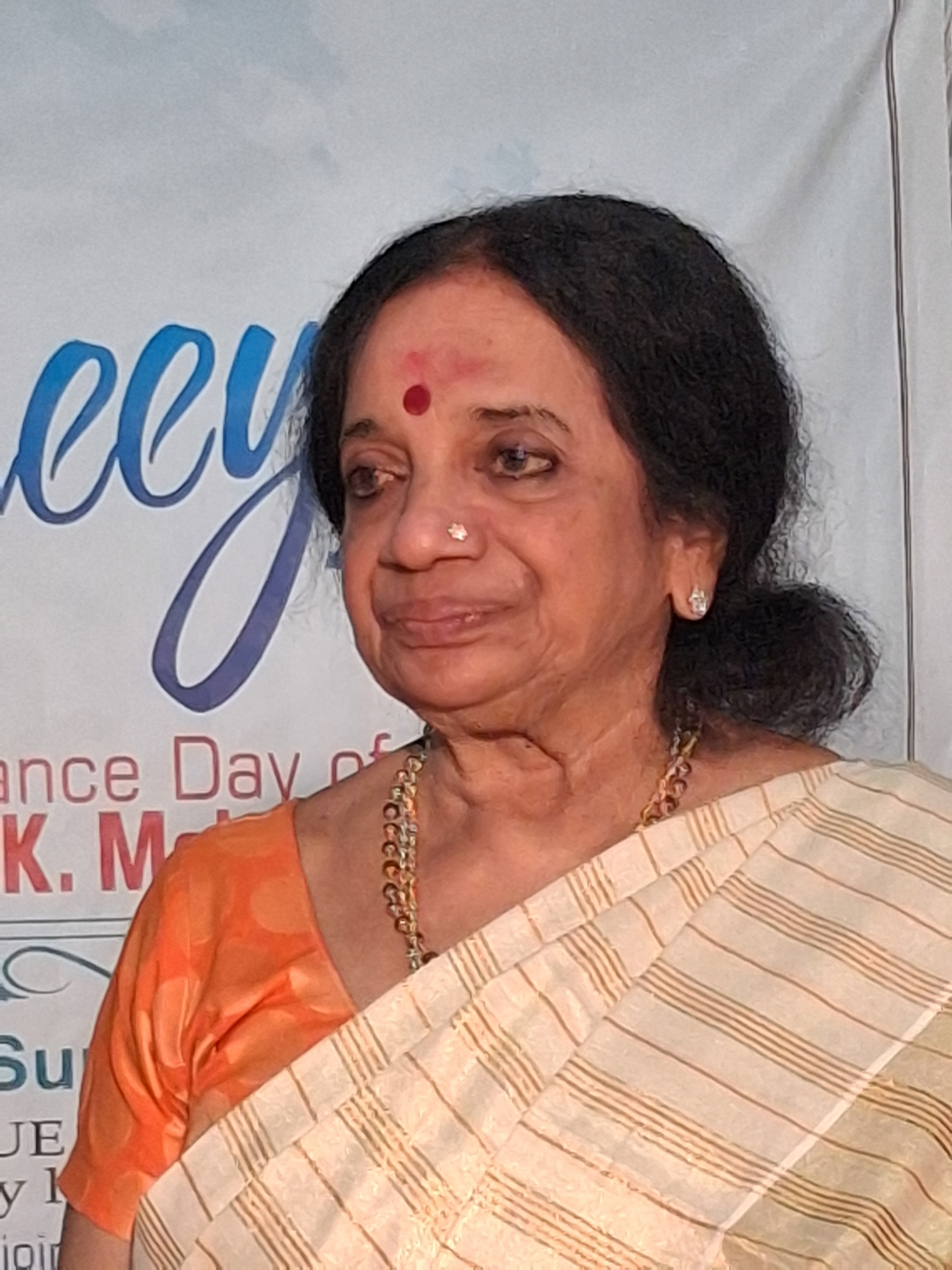
K. Omanakutty

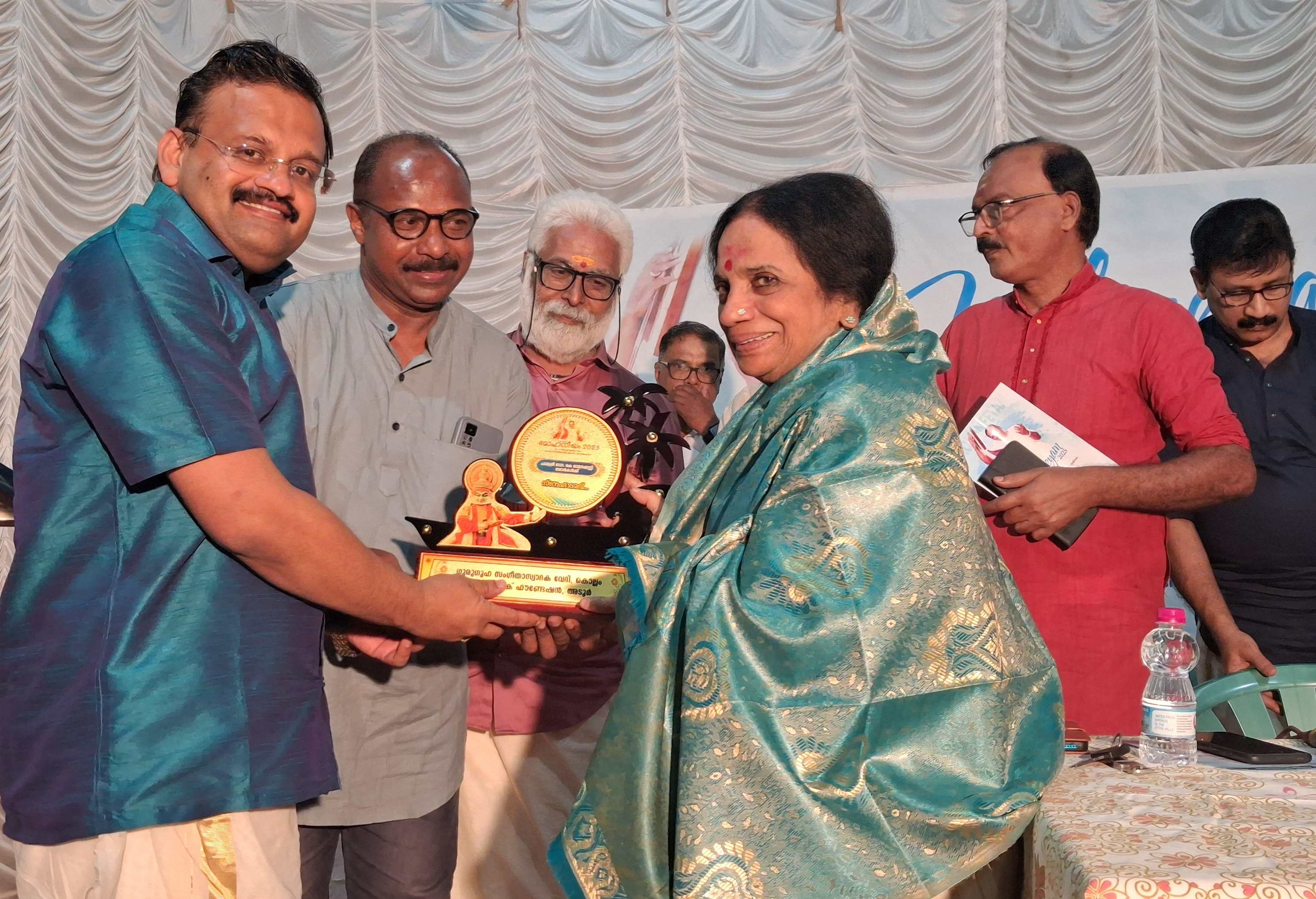
K. Omanakutty

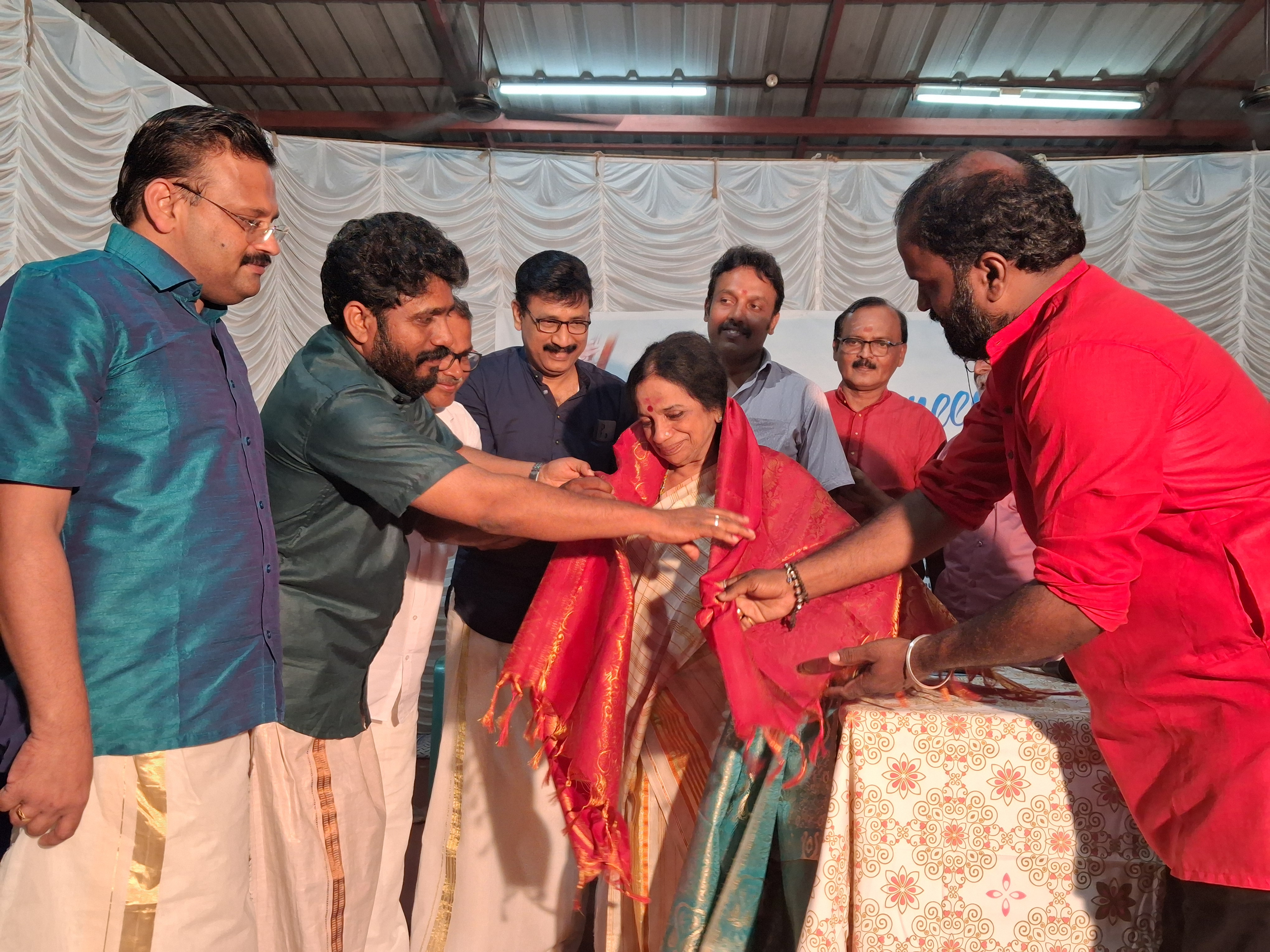
K. Omanakutty
