= Neyyattinkara Vasudevan =

Indian singer

Background information
- Born: 1938
- Origin: Neyyattinkara, Kerala, India
- Died: 13 May 2008 (aged 68)
- Genre: Carnatic music
- Occupation: Carnatic Composer

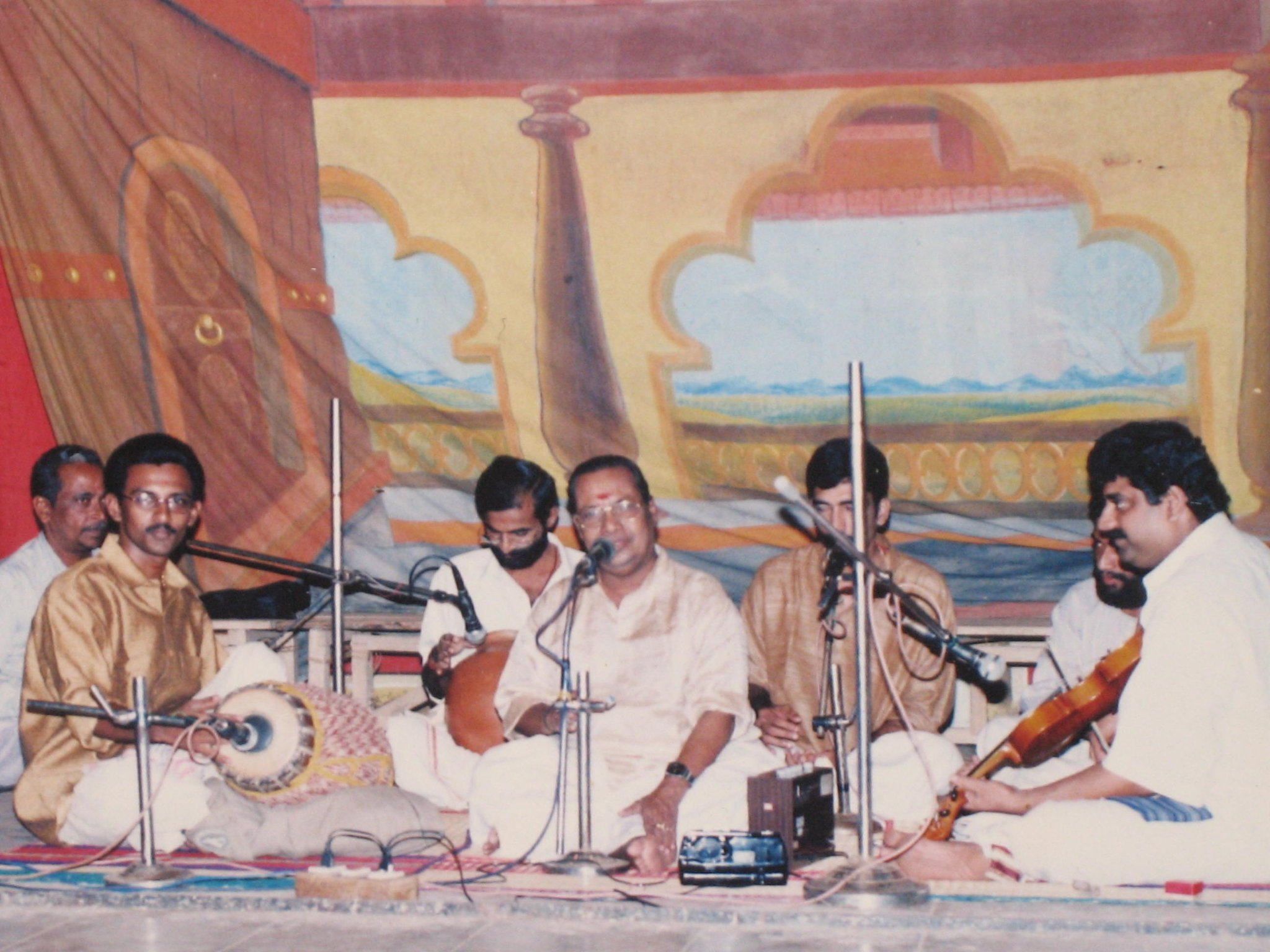
Neyyattinkara Vasudevan Sings with Thodupuzha Manojkumar on Violin, Erickavu N. Sunil on Mridangam, and Elanjimel.P.Sushilkumar on Ghatom

Neyyattinkara Vasudevan (1938–13 May 2008) was a Carnatic music vocalist from Kerala in south India. The Padma Shri-winning Carnatic vocalist and disciple of Semmangudi Srinivasa Iyer and Ramnad Krishnan, he combined tradition and innovation in his widely acclaimed career. Vasudevan is famous as being one of the first from the Dalit community to excel in the field which was previously the preserve of the upper castes.

== Biography ==
Vasudevan born in a poor Dalit family, in a village near Neyyattinkara in southern Travancore. He did his formal music studies from the Swati Tirunal Music College, Thiruvananthapuram, chiefly under Semmangudi Srinivasa Iyer. He also did advanced studies under Ramnad Krishnan. He passed Ganabhushanam in 1960 and Sangeetha Vidwan in 1962.

He worked as assistant professor at the RLV College of Music, Thrippunithura, for nearly a decade before joining All India Radio as an A-grade staff vocalist in 1974. He retired in 2000 and was later ranked 'A Top', the highest honour given by AIR to classical musicians.

He died due to liver cirrhosis on 13 May 2008 in Thiruvananthapuram aged 68. He was survived by his two sons, Jayaraj and Baburaj, when he died. Ammukkutty, his wife, predeceased him.

== Awards ==
- Padma Shri in 2004
- Swati Puraskaram in 2006
- Kerala Sangeetha Nataka Akademi Fellowship in 1989
- Kerala Sangeetha Nataka Akademi Award in 1981
- Sangeet Natak Akademi Award in 1970

== Movies ==
He has also sung for some Malayalam movies.

| Year | Song | Movie |
|---|---|---|
| 1968 | Sarasa Suvadana | Enipadikal |
| 1987 | Parama Purusha | Swathi Thirunal |
| 1987 | Mamava Sada Janani | Swathi Thirunal |
| 1987 | Kosalendra | Swathi Thirunal |
| 1987 | Pannakendra Sayana | Swathi Thirunal |
| 1988 | Nagumomu | Chitram |
| 1990 | Sree Jaanaveedharam | Vachanam |
| 2000 | Geyam hari naamadheyam | Mazha |
| 2000 | Paarukkulle | Mazha |
