= 2016 Kerala Sahitya Akademi Awards =

Indian literary awards

Kerala Sahitya Akademi Award
- Awarded for: Outstanding books of literary merit
- Date: 21 February 2018
- Location: Trichur
- Country: India
- Presented by: Kerala Sahitya Akademi
- First award: 1958

The 2016 Kerala Sahitya Akademi Award was announced on 21 February 2018. The award has been given each year since 1958, by the Kerala Sahitya Akademi (Kerala Literary Academy), to a Malayalam writer for an outstanding book of literary merit.

== Winners ==
Category	Recipient	Work	Image
Poetry	Savithri Rajeevan	Ammaye Kulippikkumpol	
Novel	T. D. Ramakrishnan	Sugandhi Enna Andal Devanayaki	
Story	S. Hareesh	Adam	
Drama	Samkutty Pattomkary	Lalla	
Literary Criticism	S. Sudheesh	Asan Kavitha: Sthree Purusha Samavakyangalile Kalaapom	
Biography and Autobiography	Chanthavila Murali	AKG: Oru Sampoorna Jeevacharithram	
Travelogue	Harikrishnan	Nile Vazhikal	
Humour	Muralee Thummarukudy	Chila Nattukaryangal	
Children's Literature	K. T. Baburaj	Samoohyapaatam	
Scholarly Literature	V. P. Joseph Valiyaveettil	Chavittu Nadaka Vijnanakosam	
Translation	C. M. Rajan	Pranayavum Mooladhanavum (Translation of Love and Capital: Karl and Jenny Marx and the Birth of a Revolution by Mary Gabriel)	
Overall Contributions	Iyyamcode Sreedharan; C. R. Omanakuttan; Lalitha Lenin; Jose Punnamparambil; P. K. Parakkadavu; Pooyappally Thankappan		
