= Kerala Sahitya Akademi Award for Humour =

Literary award

The Kerala Sahitya Akademi Award for Humour is given every year by the Kerala Sahitya Akademi (Kerala Literary Academy) to a Malayalam author for writing a book of humour of literary merit. It is one of the 12 categories of the Kerala Sahitya Akademi Award.

== Awardees ==
Year	Book	Writer	Image
1992	School Diary	Akbar Kakkattil	
1993	Jivithahladathinte Niranilavu	O. P. Joseph	
1994	Irukaali Mootakal	C. P. Nair	
1995	Kinchana Varthamanam	Chemmanam Chacko	
1996	Vayil Vannathu Kothakku Pattu	Sukumar	
1998	Nanavidham	K. Narayanan Nair	
1999	Ambada Njane	P. Subbaiah Pillai	
2000	Kalikolam	Krishna Pujappura	
2001	Padachonikku Salam	Kozhikodan	
2002	Nothing Official	Jiji Thomson	
2003	Snehapoorvam Panachi	Jose Panachippuram	
2004	Collector Kathayezhuthukayanu	P. C. Sanal Kumar	
2005	19, Kanal Road	Sreebala K. Menon	
2006	Vikatavani	Nandakishore	
2008	Kariyachante Lokam	K. L. Mohana Varma	
2009	Ronald Reaganum Balan Mashum	Marshal	
2010	Sri Bhuthanathavilasam Nair Hotel	C. R. Omanakuttan	
2011	Kaliyum Karyavum	Lalithambika	
2012	Oru Nano Kinavu	P. P. Hameed	
2013	Malayala Peruma	Dr. P. Sethumadhavan	
2014	Mazha Peythu Thorumpol	T. G. Vijayakumar	
2015	Vedi Vattom	Dr. S. D. P. Namboothiri	
2016	Chila Nattukaryangal	Muralee Thummarukudy	
2017	Ezhuthanukaranam Anuranangalum	Chowallur Krishnankutty	
2018	Who is Afraid of V. K. N.	V. K. K. Ramesh	
2019	Eeswaran Mathram Sakshi	Sathyan Anthikad	
2020	Irinjalakudakku Chuttum	Innocent	
2021	Aa For Annama	Ann Palee	
2022	Oru Kumarakamkarante Kuruthamketta Likhithangal	Jayant Kamicheril	
2023	Varanadan Kathakal	Suneesh Varanad	
2024	Keralathinte Maidhathmakatha	Niranjan	

- Notes: No awards in this category in 1997 and 2007.
