= Kerala Sahitya Akademi Award for Travelogue =

Literary award

The Kerala Sahitya Akademi Award for Travelogue is given every year by the Kerala Sahitya Akademi (Kerala Literary Academy) to a Malayalam writer for a travelogue of literary merit. It is one of the twelve categories of the Kerala Sahitya Akademi Award.

== Awardees ==
Year	Book	Writer	Image
1995	Adarunna Kakkakal	Asha Menon	
1996	Nepal Diary	O. Krishnan Patyam	
1997	Munichile Sundarikalum Sundaranmarum	S. Sivadas	
1998	Papathinte Pongachasanchi	E. Vasu	
1999	Kadukalude Thalam Thedi	B. Sujatha Devi	
2000	Pala Lokam Pala Kalam	K. Satchidanandan	
2001	Volgayil Manju Peyyumbol	Punathil Kunjabdulla	
2002	Amazonum Kure Vyakulathakalum	M. P. Veerendra Kumar	
2003	Santhimantram Muzhangunna Thazvarayil	Raju Narayana Swamy	
2004	Adarunna Akasam	George Onakkoor	
2005	Uttarakhandilude Kailas Mansarovar Yatra	M. K. Ramachandran	
2006	Oru African Yathra	Zacharia	
2007	Himalayam	Shoukath	
2008	King Learinte European Pathangal	Iyyamcode Sreedharan	
2009	Ente Keralam	K. Ravindran	
2010	Marubhumiyude Athmakatha	V. Musafar Ahammed	
2011	Volga Tharangangal	T. N. Gopakumar	
2012	Baltic Diary	Santhosh George Kulangara	
2013	Gramapathakal	P. Surendran	
2014	Pottekkattum Sreeyathoonum Balidweepum	K. A. Francis	
2015	Europe: Aatma Chihnangal	V. G. Thampi	
2015	Bhutan Dinangal	O. K. Johny	
2016	Nile Vazhikal	Harikrishnan	
2017	Ethetho Saranikalil	C. V. Balakrishnan	
2018	Londonilekku Oru Road Yathra	Baiju N. Nair	
2019	Vishudha Papangalude India	Arun Ezhuthachan	
2020	Daivam Olivil Poya Naalukal	Vidhu Vincent	
2021	Nagnarum Narabhojikalum	Venu	
2022	Murivettavarude Pathakal	Haritha Savithri	
2022	Dakshinafrican Yathrapusthakam	C. Anoop	
2023	Aamcho Basthar	Nandini Menon	
2024	Aarohanam Himalayam	K. R. Ajayan	
