= 2017 Kerala Sahitya Akademi Awards =

Indian literary awards

Kerala Sahitya Akademi Award
- Awarded for: Outstanding books of literary merit
- Date: 23 January 2019
- Location: Trichur
- Country: India
- Presented by: Kerala Sahitya Akademi
- First award: 1958

The 2017 Kerala Sahitya Akademi Award was announced on 23 January 2019. The award has been given each year, since 1958, by the Kerala Sahitya Akademi (Kerala Literary Academy), to a Malayalam writer for an outstanding book of literary merit.

== Winners ==
Category	Recipient	Work	Image
Poetry	Veerankutty	Mindaprani	
Novel	V. J. James	Nireeshwaran	
Story	Aymanam John	Ithara Characharangalude Charitrapusthakam	
Drama	S. V. Venugopan Nair	Swadeshabhimani	
Literary Criticism	Kalpatta Narayanan	Kavithayude Jeevacharithram	
Biography and Autobiography	Jayachandran Mokeri	Thakkijja, Ente Jayil Jeevitham	
Travelogue	C. V. Balakrishnan	Ethetho Saranikalil	
Humour	Chowallur Krishnankutty	Ezhuthanukaranam Anuranangalum	
Children's Literature	V. R. Sudheesh	Kurukkan Mashinte School	
Scholarly Literature	N. J. K. Nair	Nadivijnaneeyam	
Translation	Rama Menon	Parvathangalum Mattolikollunnu	
Overall Contributions	Pazhavila Rameshan; M. P. Parameswaran; Kunjappa Pattanur; K. G. Paulose; K. Ajitha; C. L. Jose		
