= Samkutty Pattomkary =

Indian theatre director and playwright (born 1969)

Dr. Samkutty Pattomary
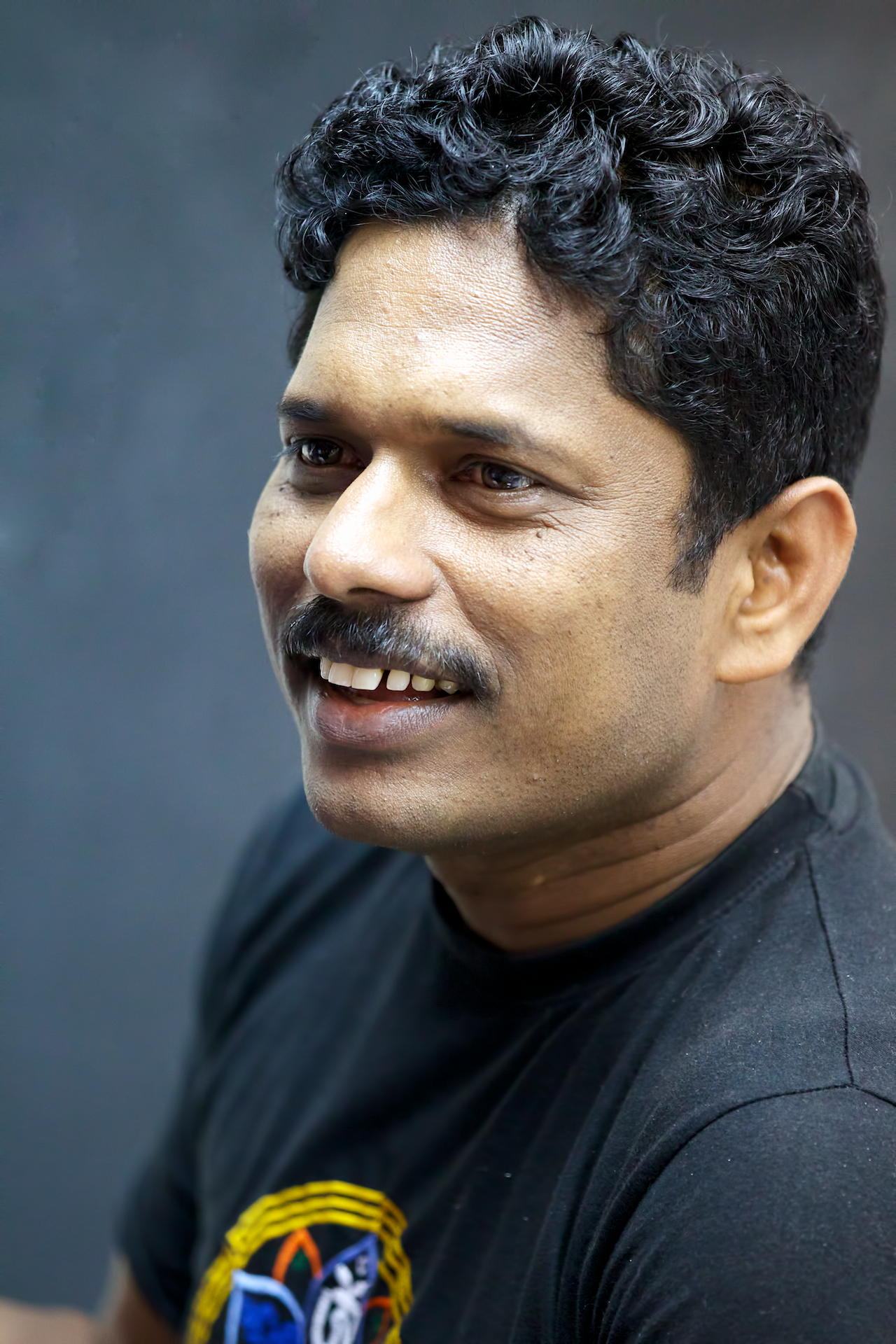
- Born: 17 April 1969 (age 57); Kallara, Kottayam district, Kerala, India
- Education: Jawaharlal Nehru University
- Occupations: Theatre Director, Scenographer, Writer and Painter
- Writing career
- Notable awards: Kerala Sahitya Akademi Award (2016); Kerala Sangeetha Nataka Akademi Award (2016)

Dr. Samkutty Pattomkary (born 17 April 1969) is an Indian theatre director, playwright, Scenographer, and visual artist from Kerala. He has directed more than 150 theatre productions in Malayalam, English, Hindi, and Kannada in India and abroad. As a playwright, he has written over 27 original plays, with six works published. He has also worked extensively as a technical director and stage designer, creating scenic, lighting, and costume designs for more than 500 amateur and professional theatre and dance productions for leading Indian and international directors.

Apart from theatre, Samkutty has worked in films as an art director and documentary director, and is also a painter who has held over 10 solo and group exhibitions across Kerala. He holds a Ph.D. in Theatre Arts from Jawaharlal Nehru University, New Delhi, and has received several national and international awards for his contributions to theatre.

Pattomkary was a former council member of the Kerala Sangeeta Nataka Academy.

== Education ==
Dr. Samkutty Pattomkary studied theatre and fine arts in Kerala and New Delhi. He holds a Ph.D. in Theatre Arts from Jawaharlal Nehru University, New Delhi. He completed his M.Phil. in Theatre from University of Calicut. He also obtained both his Master of Theatre Arts (MTA) and Bachelor of Theatre Arts (BTA) from the School of Drama, Thrissur, University of Calicut, securing First Rank in both programs. Earlier, he earned a National Diploma in Fine Arts (NDFA) in Painting and Sculpture from RLV College of Music and Fine Arts, Ernakulam.

== Selected Theatre Credits ==
Year	Title	Language	Notes
2026	Bhagavantana Marana	Kannada	
2023	Prema Bussato	Malayalam	Melbourne
2023	Sugangha	Malayalam	Bahrain
2023	Priya 'Che'	Malayalam	
2023	Haliyo Hali Hulalo	Malayalam	
2023	Ayanakandam	Malayalam	
2023	Plamya Lyubui	Malayalam	
2022	Nee Theruvinte Theekkanal	Malayalam	
2020	Shur Shomraat	Malayalam	
2019	Adayalam	Malayalam	
2019	Prema Bussato	Malayalam	
2019	Gamayinmel Gama	Malayalam	
2018	Samskara	Malayalam	
2018	Arivadayalam	Malayalam	
2018	Clinically Expired	Malayalam	
2017	Adhika Nazhika Ghadikaram	Malayalam	
2017	Nirasa Mayan	Malayalam	
2016	Coriolanus	Kannada	
2015	Kazchaye Keeri Branthum Kadannu	Malayalam	Won 5 Awards at Barath Muraly Theatre Festival, UAE.
2015	Asthamanakadalinakale	Malayalam	Won 3 Awards, All India Pravasi Theatre Festival by Kerala Sangeetha Nataka Akademi.
2015	Ek Ise Gagan Ke Thale	Hindi	
2014	Tughlaq	Kannada	Performed at 17th Bharat Rang Mahotsav International Theatre Festival, 2015.
2014	Ottu	Malayalam	
2014	Pamaranam Pattukaran	Malayalam	
2006	Medea	Kannada	Performed at 12th Bharat Rang Mahotsav International Theatre Festival, 2010.
2005	Pralayam	Malayalam	Performed at 8th Bharat Rang Mahotsav International Theatre Festival, 2006.
2004	Agni	Malayalam	Performed at 7th Bharat Rang Mahotsav International Theatre Festival, 2005. and Sangeet Natak Akademi National Festival, Eranakulam.

== Awards and recognition ==
- 2024 Chirayankeezhu Dr. G. Gangadharan Nair Memorial Award
- 2022 Prof. Perunna Vijayan Nataka Award
- 2018 State Award for his play Lalla by Kerala Sahitya Akademi, Government of Kerala
- 2018 O Madhavan Award for his entire body of work in theatre
- 2017 Pravasi Kerala Sangeetha Nataka Akademi Award
- 2016 State Award for Scenic designer (Mayadarpan), Kerala Sangeetha Nataka Akademi, Government of Kerala
- 2016 State Award for Playwright (Lalla), Kerala Sahitya Akademi Award, Government of Kerala
