= 2018 Kerala Sahitya Akademi Awards =

Indian literary awards

Kerala Sahitya Akademi Award
- Awarded for: Outstanding books of literary merit
- Date: 20 December 2019
- Location: Trichur
- Country: India
- Presented by: Kerala Sahitya Akademi
- First award: 1958

The 2018 Kerala Sahitya Akademi Award was announced on 20 December 2019. The award has been given annually since 1958, by the Kerala Sahitya Akademi (Kerala Literary Academy), to a Malayalam writer for an outstanding book of literary merit.

== Winners ==
Category	Recipient	Work	Image
Poetry	V. M. Girija	Budha Purnima	
Novel	K. V. Mohan Kumar	Ushnarashi	
Story	K. Rekha	Mananchira	
Drama	Rajmohan Neeleswaram	Choottum Koottum	
Literary Criticism	P. P. Raveendran	Adhunikathayude Pinampuram	
Biography and Autobiography	Muni Narayana Prasad	Athmayanam	
Travelogue	Baiju N. Nair	Londonilekku Oru Road Yathra	
Humour	V. K. K. Ramesh	Who is Afraid of V. K. N.	
Children's Literature	S. R. Lal	Kunjunniyude Yathrapusthakam	
Scholarly Literature	Dr. K. Babu Joseph	Padartham Muthal Daivakanam Vare	
Translation	P. P. K. Poduval	Swapnangalude Vyakhyanam (The Interpretation of Dreams)	
Overall Contributions	Scaria Zacharia; O. M. Anujan; S. Rajasekharan; Manamboor Rajan Babu; Nalini Bekal		
