= 2020 Kerala Sahitya Akademi Awards =

2020 Literary award given to Malayalam writers

Kerala Sahitya Akademi Award
- Awarded for: Outstanding books of literary merit
- Date: 17 August 2021
- Location: Trichur
- Country: India
- Presented by: Kerala Sahitya Akademi
- First award: 1958

The 2020 Kerala Sahitya Akademi Award was announced on 17 August 2021. The award has been given each year since 1958, by the Kerala Sahitya Akademi (Kerala Literary Academy), to Malayalam writers for their outstanding books of literary merit.

== Winners ==
Category	Recipient	Work	Image
Poetry	O. P. Suresh	Taj Mahal	
Novel	P. F. Mathews	Adiyalapretham	
Story	Unni R.	Vaanku	
Drama	Sreejith Poyilkkavu	Dwayam	
Literary Criticism	Dr. P. Soman	Vyloppilli Kavitha: Oru Idathupaksha Vayana	
Biography and Autobiography	K. Raghunathan	Mukthakantam V. K. N.	
Travelogue	Vidhu Vincent	Daivam Olivil Poya Naalukal	
Humour	Innocent	Irinjalakudakku Chuttum	
Children's Literature	Priya A. S.	Perumazhayathe Kunjithalukal	
Scholarly Literature	Dr. T. K. Anandi	Marxisavum Feminisavum Charithraparamaya Vishakalanam	
Translation	Sangeetha Sreenivasan	Upekshikkappetta Divasangal (The Days of Abandonment by Elena Ferrante)	
Overall Contributions	K. K. Kochu; Mampuzha Kumaran; K. R. Mallika; Sidharthan Paruthikad; Chavara K. S. Pillai; M. A. Rahman		
