= 2019 Kerala Sahitya Akademi Awards =

Indian literary awards

Kerala Sahitya Akademi Award
- Awarded for: Outstanding books of literary merit
- Date: 15 February 2021
- Location: Trichur
- Country: India
- Presented by: Kerala Sahitya Akademi
- First award: 1958

The 2019 Kerala Sahitya Akademi Award was announced on 15 February 2021. The award has been given each year since 1958 by the Kerala Sahitya Akademi (Kerala Literary Academy), to a Malayalam writer of a outstanding books of literary merit.

== Winners ==
Category	Recipient	Work	Image
Poetry	P. Raman	Rathri Panthrandarakkoru Tharat	
Poetry	M. R. Renukumar	Kothiyan	
Novel	S. Hareesh	Meesha	
Story	Vinoy Thomas	Ramachi	
Drama	Sajitha Madathil	Arangile Mathsyagandhikal	
Drama	Jisha Abhinaya	Eli Eli Lama Sabaktani	
Literary Criticism	Dr. K. M. Anil	Pantharum Vazhiyambalangalum	
Biography and Autobiography	M. G. S. Narayanan	Jalakangal: Oru Charithranweshiyude Vazhikal Kazhchakal	
Travelogue	Arun Ezhuthachan	Vishudha Papangalude India	
Humour	Sathyan Anthikad	Eeswaran Mathram Sakshi	
Children's Literature	K. R. Viswanathan	Hisaga	
Scholarly Literature	R. V. G. Menon	Shastra Sankethika Vidyakalude Charithram	
Translation	K. Aravindakshan	Gautama Buddhante Parinirvanam	
Overall Contributions	Dalit Bandhu N. K. Jose; Palakkeezh Narayanan; P. Appukuttan; Rosemary; U. Kalanathan; C. P. Aboobacker		
