= Government College, Chittur =

College in Kerala, India

- Motto: महाजनो येन गतः स पन्थाः
- Type: Public
- Established: 1947
- Affiliations: University of Calicut
- Students: 1778
- Location: Chittur, Kerala, 678104, India; 10.6869°N 76.7234°E
- Campus: Rural
- Website: chitturcollege.ac.in

Government College, Chittur is an educational institution located in Chittur, Palakkad, Kerala. The college is affiliated to the University of Calicut and is recognized as a special-grade college under the Department of Collegiate Education, Government of Kerala.

== History ==
The college was established on 11 August 1947, by Cherubala Karunakara Menon, ICS, Devan of erstwhile Cochin state. Initially under the University of Madras and got affiliated to Travancore University in 1949. It started functioning in the present 40 acre campus on the bank of Sokanasini river since 1954.

== Academics ==
The college provides undergraduate and postgraduate education in science, arts and commerce streams. There are 15 departments: Geography, Botany, Chemistry, Commerce, Economics, Electronics, History, Malayalam, Mathematics, Music, Philosophy, Physics, English, Tamil, and Zoology. The Departments of Tamil, Geography, Philosophy, Music and Mathematics are the research departments under the University of Calicut. It has been accredited by NAAC with an A Grade (CGPA 3.01 out of 4).

== Notable alumni ==
- Mohan Sharma, Indian Film Actor
- Thiruvizha Jayashankar, classical Music Performer
- Krishnachandran, Singer, Actor
- Ramesh Narayan, Musician
- Maythil Radhakrishnan, Writer
- T K Noushad, Ex MLA
- Palakkad Sreeram, Playback singer
- M. K. Sankaran Namboothiri, Vocalist
- Sainoj, Playback singer
- Bhavana Radhakrishnan, Carnatic Singer
- Asha Menon (writer)
- K. A. Jayaseelan, Poet
- Madhu Ambat, Cinematographer
- P. Sukumar, Actor, Cinematographer, Director
- Vipin Mohan, Cinematographer, Director

== Notable faculty ==
- Narendra Prasad
- M. Krishnan Nair (author)
- Vishnunarayanan Namboothiri
- Panmana Ramachandran Nair
- G. N. Panicker
- M. Thomas Mathew

== See also ==
- List of institutions of higher education in Kerala
- List of colleges affiliated to the University of Calicut
- List of educational institutions in Palakkad district
