= Agninakshathram =

Agninakshathram (lit. 'fate of fire') may refer to these Indian films:

- Agninakshathram (1977 film), Malayalam film released in 1978 starring Mohan and Lakshmi
- Agninakshathram (2004 film), Malayalam film released in 2004 starring Suresh Gopi and Indraja
