= Valayil Korath Mathews =

Indian businessman

Valayil Korath Mathews is an entrepreneur and the founder chairman of IBS Software Services, a software product company based in India. He is regarded as a thought leader in the global aviation industry and has been a speaker at various international events conducted by IATA, Harvard Business School, and NASSCOM.

== Early life ==
V. K. Mathews was born and raised in Kizhakkambalam, a village in Ernakulam district, Kerala, India. He spent his childhood there with his parents, two brothers, and a sister. His father, Korath, was among the founding managers of Federal Bank, while his mother was a homemaker.

Mathews received his early education at St. Joseph's School and completed his pre-university studies at St. Peter's College, Kolenchery. He earned a bachelor's degree in Mechanical Engineering from Mar Athanasius College of Engineering and subsequently completed a postgraduate degree in Aeronautical Engineering from Indian Institute of Technology Kanpur. He later attended the Executive Management Program at Harvard Business School.

== Career ==
Mathews started off his career as a faculty member at the Military College for Indian Army in 1980, teaching computer science. From 1981 to 1983, he worked as systems analyst with Air India. From 1983 to 1997, he worked as the General Manager at Emirates. He founded IBS Software Services in 1997.

== Honours and awards ==
George Thomas Kottukappally Trust Award 2014 for ethical business person in association with Alumni Association St Thomas College Pala

- V C Padmanabhan Memorial Award 2015
- Kerala shree 2024 (for trade)
- Management Leadership Award of 2013
- Business Man of the Year Award
- IT Man of the Year Award
- Millennium Leadership Award
- Enterprise Excellence Award.

== Positions held ==
- Member, IT Advisory Board / Higher Education Council, Government of Kerala.
- Member, Board of Directors, Kerala State Industrial Development Corporation, Government of Kerala
- Member, Board of Directors, IIITM-K.
- Chairman, TATF.
- Charter member, TiE.
- Chairman, Kerala State Council, Confederation of Indian Industry
- Chairman, GTECH
- Executive council member, NASSCOM
- Member, Governing Council, Technopark, Trivandrum
- Member, Kerala State Innovation Council
- Chairman, Calicut FC

== Philanthropy ==
Mathews initiated in setting up the Divine Children's Home in Trivandrum for destitute children. He mobilised US$100,000 from Oakridge National Lab, USA to support this initiative.
