= Sasidharan Naduvil =

Indian theatre person (born 1963)

- Born: 1963 (age 62–63); Vallachira in Thrissur district, Kerala, India
- Occupations: theatre actor, playwright, theatre director
- Awards: Kerala Sangeetha Nataka Akademi Award (multiple); Kerala Sahitya Akademi Award for Drama (2024)

Sasidharan Naduvil is an Indian theatre director and rural theatre activist from Kerala. He received many awards, including the Kerala Sangeetha Nataka Akademi Awards for the best director and best playwright, Kerala Sangeetha Nataka Akademi's Gurupooja Award and the 2024 Kerala Sahitya Akademi Award for Drama.

== Biography ==
Sasidharan Naduvil was born in 1963 in Vallachira in Thrissur district of Kerala. He wrote and directed a play at the age of 15 while studying at Cherpp CNN School.

== Theatre career and contributions ==
Sasidharan started his theatrical activism from the Vallachira Grama Nataka Vedi, a village drama society in his home village. He participated in the 'Natya Samaro Hill' program held in Delhi in 1987.

Sasidharan has directed over 450 plays, adapted around thirty literary works, including those in other languages, into drama form, and written 13 plays of his own.

He has presented plays at the South Zone National Festivals for various Indian universities 11 times. His plays have been selected for more than 50 venues in India including Bharat Ranga Mahotsavam in Delhi, Mahindra - Excellence Theatre Awards Festival, Mumbai Keli Festival, Mysore Rangayana Festival, Itfolk, PRD Festival, etc. He has also performed plays at the Theatre Olympics.

The main plays he has directed are Kalane Theeni, Death Watch, The Men Without Shadow, Tamass, Chomanadudi, Pali, Balya Kala Sakhi, Pulappedi, Carmen Jesus, Christ the Super Star, Kizhavanum Kadalum, Balcony, Higuita, Irikappindam Katha Kada, Thavittu Pithalattam, Maha Paradesam, Gaddhika.

He has also performed plays in the UAE, Australia, Sydney and Ireland. He is the founder and director of the Remembrance Theatre Group, and Jose Chirammal Memorial Nadaka Dweep, a rural theatre performance centre which operates in Vallachira.

Sasidharan has taught drama to students of the Palakkad NSS Engineering College for about 25 years. In addition, agricultural drama festivals and drama training sessions are regularly organized at Jose Chiramel Nataka Dweep in Vallachira under the leadership of Sasidharan Naduvil.

== Notable adaptations ==
The play Higuita is a drama adaptation of N. S. Madhavan's story with same title. The one and a half hour long play 'Red Cross', written and directed by him is a synthesis of 3 Malayalam short stories.

His other Malayalam adaptations include The Balcony by the French dramatist Jean Genet, The Old Man and the Sea by the American author Ernest Hemingway, and The Dumb Dancer (1961) by indian playwright Asif Currimbhoy.

== Awards and honours ==
Sasidharan received the 2024 Kerala Sahitya Akademi Award for Drama for the play Pithala Shalabham. Pithala Shalabham is a play that chronicles the history of the art village of Vallachira. He has received many other awards including the Kerala Sangeetha Nataka Akademi Awards for the best director and best playwright, Kerala Sangeetha Nataka Akademi's Gurupooja Award for overall contribution, the Manneeyam Nataka Jyothis Award, Gramika's Prathama Mohan Raghavan Award, Rangamudra's Sathyan Smaraka Award, Canberra Oaker Theatre Award, Sydney Art Collective Award, Badal Media Award, Thrissur Rangachetana Award, Bharat Bhavan Award, Ireland I Mandala-Malayalam Adaravu and many others. He was also awarded the best director 21 times in drama competitions at Calicut University.
