= Asha Menon (writer) =

Indian writer

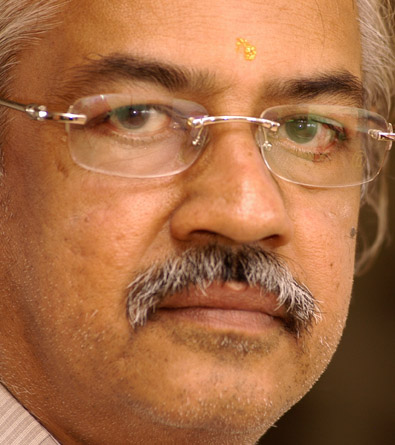
- Born: 18 November 1947 (age 78); Kollengode, Palakkad district, Kerala
- Occupations: Writer, Author, Reviewer
- Writing career
- Language: Malayalam
- Genres: Stories, Travelogue
- Notable awards: Kerala Sahitya Akademi Award for Travelogue
- Website: Official website

K. Sreekumar, known as Asha Menon is a writer and reviewer of Malayalam literature.

== Personal life ==
Asha Menon was born on 18 November 1947 at Kollengode, Palakkad district, Kerala, India. He graduated with a Bachelor's Degree from Government College, Chittur. He left his engineering studies midway to join the South Indian Bank as an officer. After some years, he took voluntary retirement from the service. He is a lifelong bachelor.

== Works ==
Asha Menon is a study of a calm search for nature and man, and a study of genetics, music, science and spirituality.

- Puthiya Purusharthangal (1978)
- Kaliyugaranyakangal (1982)
- Parivrajakante Mozhi (1984)
- Prathirodhangal (1985)
- Herbarium (1985)
- Thanumanasi (1990)
- Jeevante Kaiyoppu (1992)
- Adarunna Kakkakal (Travelogue-1994)
- Paragakosangal (1997)
- Payasvini (1999)
- Krishnasilayum Himasirassum (2001)
- Khalsayude Jalasmrithi (2003)
- Sraddhaswarangal (2006)
- Osho Vinte Neela Njarambu (2007)
- Himalaya Prathyakshangal (2007)
- Elamulachikal (2007, 2010)
- Himachalinte Nissanthwanangal (2010)
- Prathirodhangal (2010)
- Katha Dasakam (2012)
- Utharendian Greeshmathiloode (2015)

== Awards ==
- Kerala Sahitya Akademi Award for 'Thanumanasi' in 1990.
- Kerala Sahitya Akademi Award for 'Jeevante Kaiyoppu' in 1994.
- Nalappadan Award 2022 for his Holistic Contributions to Malayalam Literature (Nalappadan Memorial Cultural Society-NMCS)

== See also ==
- Kerala Sahitya Akademi Award for Travelogue to Adarunna Kakkakal in 1995
