= K. Poulose Jacob =

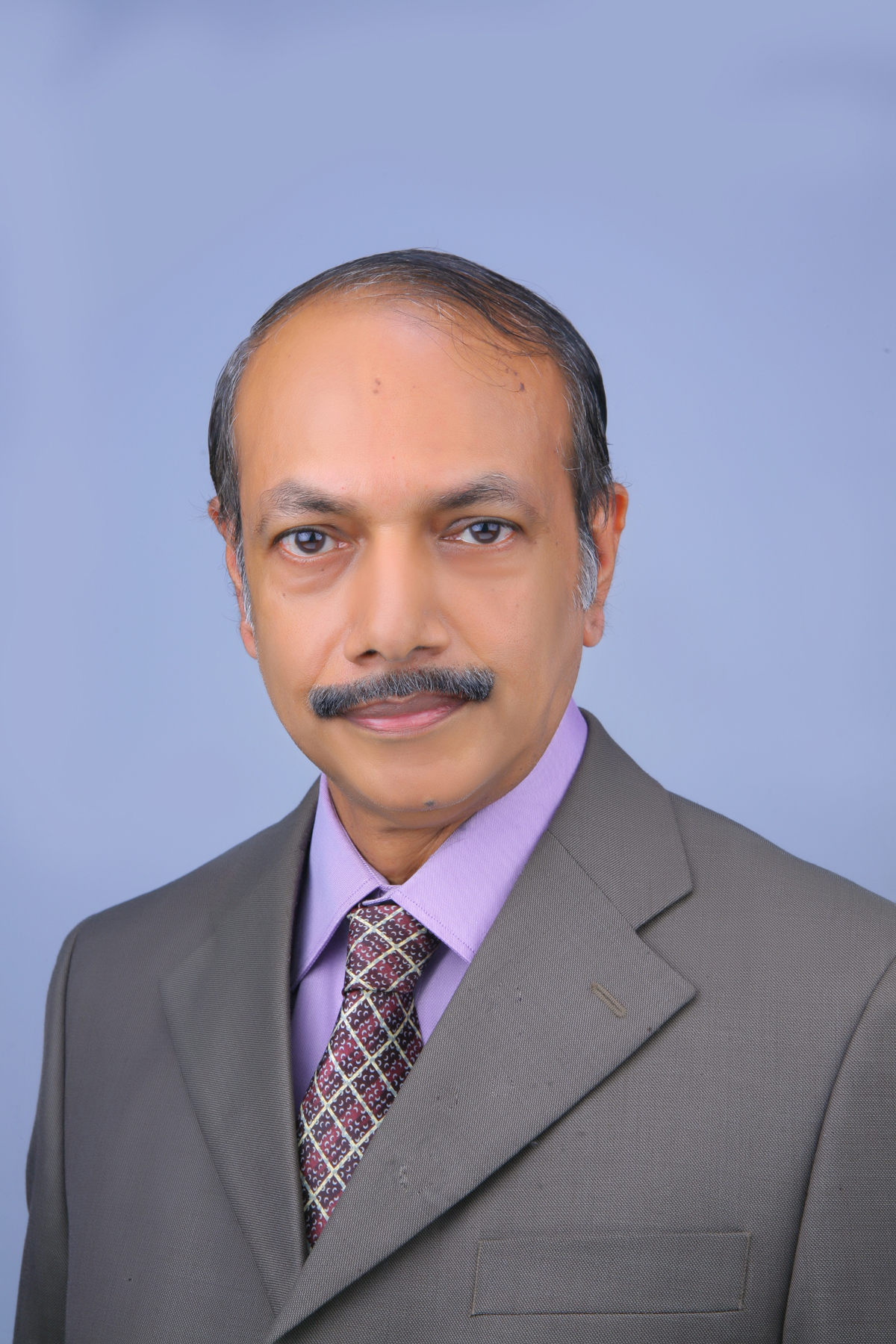
- Education: PhD – Cochin University of Science and Technology; Master's – Cochin University of Science and Technology
- Alma mater: Maharaja's College, Ernakulam; Mar Athanasius College of Engineering; Cochin University of Science and Technology
- Occupation: Pro vice chancellor at Cochin University of Science and Technology - 2013-2017
- Spouse: Shirly
- Children: 3

K. Poulose Jacob, Professor of Computer Science at Cochin University of Science and Technology (CUSAT) since 1994, was Vice Chancellor (officiating - 2014) and Pro Vice Chancellor of Cochin University of Science and Technology - 2013 to 2017.

== Early education and career ==
Poulose Jacob joined Cochin University of Science and Technology as a lecturer in 1983 after serving in the R&D group of a company in the computer peripheral manufacturing industry for one year. He has been teaching B.Tech. students at the university since 1980. He was the first PhD in Computer Engineering from the Cochin University of Science and Technology (CUSAT). He was promoted to Reader in Computer Science in 1989 and subsequently to Professor in 1994.

Poulose Jacob is the founder Director of the School of Computer Science Studies at CUSAT. The MCA program of CUSAT currently administered at the Department of Computer Applications, a constituent of the School of Computer Science Studies, has been well served by his leadership. Two new M.Tech. programs were started in the Department of Computer Science, also a constituent of the School, under his initiative. The Information Technology branch in the undergraduate engineering program was conceived by his team, since adopted at the national level. He initiated the M.Tech. program in the branch of Computer Science & Engineering in the neighboring Mahatma Gandhi University, as the designated convener of the core committee. He initiated and developed several new laboratories at the UG and PG level at CUSAT. The CUSAT intranet as well as the CUSAT website was the result of his initiative and guidance. He has been director of the CUSAT Computer Centre and also initiated the Centre for Information Resource Management (CIRM), which presently supports the entire digital resources in CUSAT.

He was the Dean of the Faculty of Engineering and has served as chairman, Board of Studies in Computer Science, as well as chairman, Board of Studies in Computer Applications and the Board of Studies in Engineering. As chairman of the Board of Studies in Defence Science and Technology at CUSAT, he played lead role in tailoring the academic programmes of the Naval Schools under the Ministry of Defence, Government of India. He has also served as Dean of the Faculty of Technology and as member of the CUSAT Syndicate. He has been a member of Academic Council of CUSAT continuously since 1994, right up to 2021 creating a record of tenure. He was elected to the university senate, repeatedly for a continuous term of 12 years.

He held additional administrative responsibilities at CUSAT, such as Head of the Department of Computer Applications. He was Director of the Centre for MHO Co-operation, which was managing the 150 million Indian rupee funding assistance from the Dutch Government, for improving standards in identified areas of teaching and research in the university. He was the designated officer to liaise with the funding agency at the Hague and with the four collaborating Universities in the Netherlands, making periodic visits to those Universities as well as to the Hague. As Director of Strategic Planning in CUSAT, he played the key role in preparing the DPR submitted to the MHRD, with respect to upgrading CUSAT to an Institution of National Importance (INI). The designated expert committee approved the DPR and recommended financial support to the tune of Rs.600 crores. As Director of CUSAT Planning & Development Division, he led the team that was instrumental in preparing the XII plan document of CUSAT submitted to the University Grants Commission.

His research interests are mainly in intelligent architectures, networks, information systems engineering, and artificial intelligence. He has more than 155 publications to his credit, listed in Google Scholar. Twenty five candidates have earned their doctoral degree under his guidance. He is PhD examiner for ten other universities. He has traveled abroad extensively, also participating in conferences at places in the United States, Costa-Rica, UK, Europe, Australia, Africa, Malaysia, Singapore Philippines, Vietnam, Bahrain and the United Arab Emirates. As a member of the Standing Committee of the University Grants Commission (UGC), he was part of policy making in Computer Education & Development at the national level. He is in the governing council of three institutions of higher learning in engineering. He is on the editorial board of two journals.

During 2016–2021, he was the Chairman of the Scientific Computing Panel, a constituent of the Naval Research Board under the Government of India Defence Research and Development Organisation, with the role to foster national defence research. Currently, his research pursuits get focus in his tenure as Dean(Research & Development) at the Rajagiri School of Engineering and Technology. an autonomous institution offering UG, PG and Doctoral programmes in Engineering. He had also occupied the industry sponsored NeST Chair Professor position at Rajagiri.

== Pro vice-chancellorship ==
Poulose Jacob served as Pro Vice-Chancellor of CUSAT for the full tenure of four years, from 26 June 2013 to 25 June 2017. During January 2014 to October 2014, he was the Vice-Chancellor (officiating) of CUSAT. The CUSAT Seminar Complex, having a theatre type auditorium with 700 seats was completed and inaugurated by the Hon. Chief Minister of the state, during this period. Faculty appointments were resumed after an interregnum; appointment to the post of Registrar was made overcoming several hindrances. The accreditation process under NAAC, long overdue, was initiated and requisite documents submitted; ultimately CUSAT could secure A Grade, after due process of assessment by Peer Team. Several steps at improving the infrastructure as well as beautification of the campus were initiated. The Faculty of Architecture was instituted and the first Dean nominated. Career advancement of teachers was processed. and the process put on track for continuance. CUSAT could become a partner in the South Asia Anglia partnership, a British Council supported programme, along with legendary institutions like the University of Mumbai, University of Mysore etc., an outcome of his initiative. As a sequel to this, he delivered an invited talk on "Government, Governance and Growth: a constant juggle" at the leadership conference at Cambridge in the UK, hosted by the partnership.
