= C. L. Jose =

Indian playwright

- Born: 4 April 1932 (age 94); Puthukad, Thrissur district, Kerala, India
- Occupation: Playwright
- Notable work: Manalkkadu; Jwalanam; Yugathrishna; Agnivalayam
- Spouse: Lissy
- Parents: Lonappan; Mariakutty
- Awards: 1978 Kerala Sahitya Akademi Award for Drama; 2008 Kerala Sangeetha Nataka Akademi Award; 2008 Chevalier of the Holy See; 2012 Kerala Sangeetha Nataka Akademi Fellowship; 2016 S. L. Puram Sadanandan Puraskaram; 2017 Kerala Sahitya Akademi Award for Overall Contributions; 2023 Kerala Sahitya Akademi Fellowship
- Website: website

Chakkalakal Lonappan Jose, is an Indian playwright of Malayalam literature. One of the pioneers of popular Malayalam theatre and a former chairman of the Kerala Sangeetha Nataka Akademi, Jose is the author of 36 plays, 75 one-act plays, one children's play and Ormakalkku Urakkamilla, his autobiography. He is a recipient of the Kerala Sahitya Akademi Award for Drama, Kerala Sahitya Akademi Award for Overall Contributions, Kerala Sahitya Akademi Fellowship, Kerala Sangeetha Nataka Akademi Award, Kerala Sangeetha Nataka Akademi Fellowship and S. L. Puram Sadanandan Puraskaram of the Kerala Sangeetha Nataka Akademi.

== Biography ==
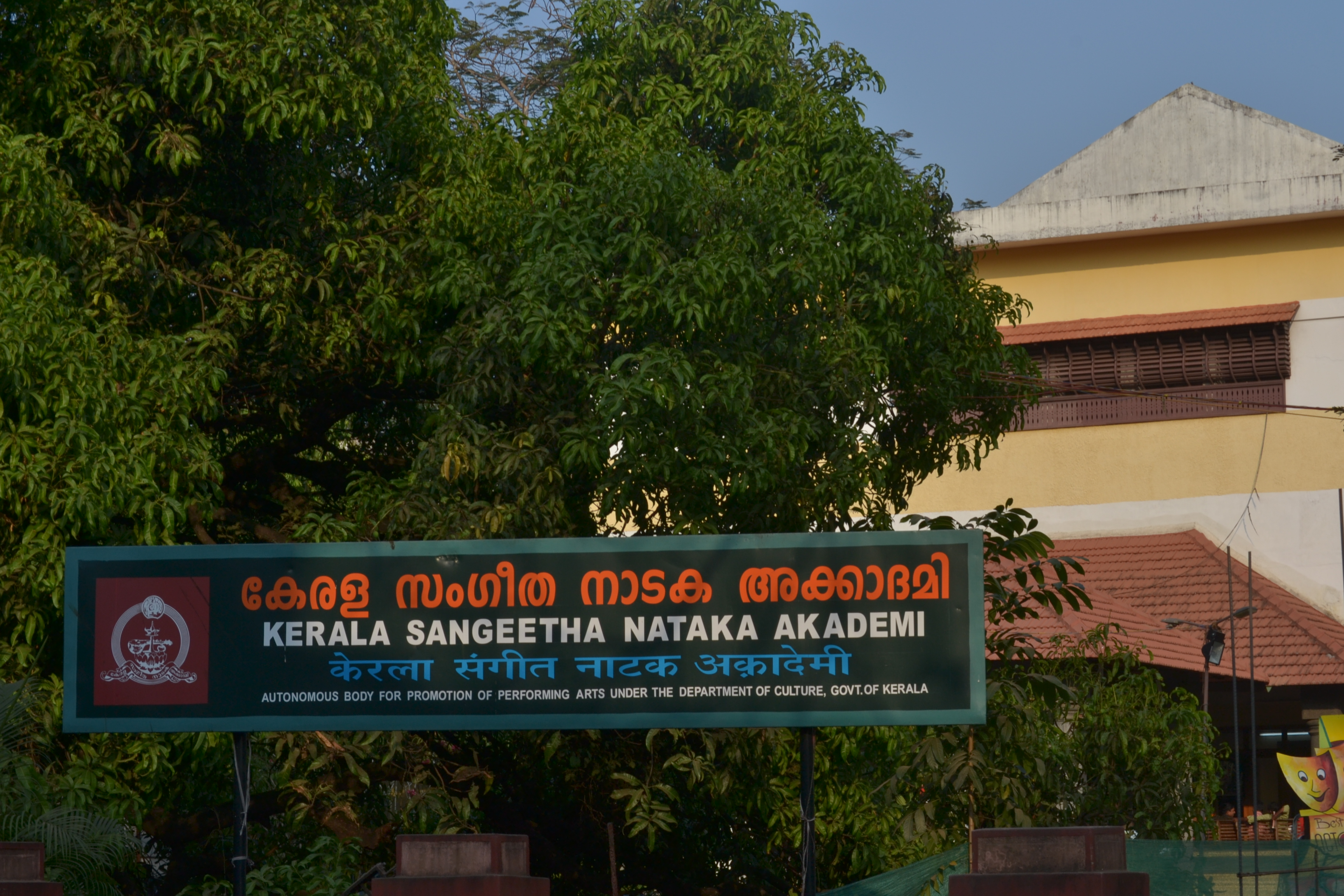
Jose chaired Kerala Sangeetha Nataka Akademi in the 90s

C. L. Jose was born in the Chakkalakal house at Puthukad, Thrissur district of the south Indian state of Kerala to Lonappan and Manjali Mariakutty as the eldest of their nine children. His early education was at St. Mary's Lourde's U.P. School - Thrissur after which he started his career at a Chit fund company in Thrissur as a clerk. He started his literary career as a playwright with Manam Thelinju, which he wrote for a local club in the town when he was 24. This followed a body of work which comprises 36 plays, 75 one-act plays and one children's play. Besides he has documented the story of his life in an autobiography, Ormakalkku Urakkamilla. His plays were popular in the amateur theatre Manalkadu, one of his plays, has been translated into 14 Indian languages and was broadcast through the All India Radio as a part of their Drama Week. The work was later adapted into a film Ariyatha Veethikal by K. S. Sethumadhavan. Subsequently, two more of his plays were made into films viz. Bhoomiyile Malakha in 1965 and Agninakshathram in 2004.

Jose has served as a faculty of fine arts at the University of Calicut, has been a member of the Kerala Sahithya Akademi and the Samastha Kerala Sahithya Parishad, has sat in the advisory board of the All India Radio and has presided over the Fine Arts Society of Thrissur. He also chaired the Kerala Sangeetha Nataka Akademi for a brief period in the 1990s and serves as a member of the Pastoral council of the Archdiocese of Thrissur. Three of his plays have been included in the academic curriculum; Manalkkad at the University of Calicut, Jwalanam at the University of Kerala and Yugathrushna at Mahatma Gandhi University.

Jose is married to Lissy and the couple has a daughter and two sons. The family lives in Puthukad, in Thrissur.

== Awards and honours ==
Jose, who received the Madras Film Fans Association Award for the best film story for the film Agninakshatram in 1977, received the Kerala Sahitya Akademi Award for Drama in 1978 for his play, Jwalanam and the year 2008 brought him two awards viz,. the Kerala Sangeetha Nataka Akademi Award and the Chevalier title of the Holy See. The Kerala Sangeetha Nataka Akademi inducted him as a fellow in 2012, and four years later, he received the 2016 S. L. Puram Sadanandan Puraskaram - the highest award in theatre of the Government of Kerala. The Kerala Sahitya Akademi honoured him again with their annual award for overall contributions in 2017. In 2020, he received the Abu Dhabi Sakthi Award for Overall Contribution (T. K. Ramakrishnan Award). In 2023, he received the Kerala Sahitya Akademi Fellowship.

== Bibliography ==
=== Plays ===
- Jose, C. L. (1970). Pollunna paramarthagal. Sahitya Pravarthaka Sahakarana Sangam.
- Jose, C. L. (1971). Manal kaadu. Sahitya Pravarthaka Sahakarana Sangam.
- Jose, C. L. (1971). Vishudha papam. C. L. Jose.
- Jose, C. L. (1971). Nashtta swargam. S.P.C.S.
- Jose, C. L. (1977). Agnivalayam. National Book Stall.
- Jose, C. L. (1982). Yugathrushna. Kottayam: Current Books.
- Jose, C. L. (1986). Bali pushpam. Kottayam: S.P.C.S.
- Jose, C. L. (1988). Mizhineer pookkal. Kottayam: S.P.C.S.
- Jose, C. L. (2007). C L Josinte theranjetutha aramanikoor naatakangal. Kozhikode: Poorna Publications. ISBN 9788130006611.
- Jose, C. L. (1982). Manassil oru deepam. Kottayam, NBS.
- Jose, C. L. (1989). Meghadhwani.
- Jose, C. L. (1995). Kurisu chumakkunnavar. Kottayam, DCB.
- Jose, C. L. (1992). Kodunkaatturangunna veedu. Kottayam, NBS.
- Jose, C. L. (1985). Karutha velicham. Kottayam, SPCS.
- Jose, C. L. (1988). Josinte ekaankangal. Kottayam, NBS.
- Jose, C. L. (1979). Jeevitham oru kodunkaattaanu. Kottayam, NBS.
- Jose, C. L. (1977). Jwalanam.
- Jose, C. L. (1982). Bheethi. Kottayam, NBS.
- Jose, C. L. (1980). Bhoomiyile maalaakha. Kottayam, NBS.
- Jose, C. L. (1986). Asanipaatham. Kottayam, NBS.
- Jose, C. L. (1991). Aathmayudham.
- Jose, C. L. (1959). Vedanayude thaazhvarayil. Kottayam, NBS.
- Jose, C. L. (1963). Thee pidicha aathmaavu.
- Jose, C. L. (1987). Sokapakshi. Kottayam, NBS.
- Jose, C. L. (1980). Seema. Kottayam, NBS.
- Jose, C. L. (1974). Saaparasmi. Kottayam, SPCS.
- Jose, C. L. (1976). Sooryaakhaatham.
- Jose, C. L. (1968). Oliyambukal.
- Jose, C. L. (1996). Maari veesunna kaattu. Kottayam, DCB.

=== Non fiction ===
- Jose, C. L. (2007). Chriyude Melam. Kottayam: Current Books. ISBN 9788124017623.
- Jose, C. L. (2012). Nataka rachana, enthu, engane?. Kottayam: Sahitya Pravarthaka Co-operative Society.
- Jose, C. L. (1996). Naatakathinte kaanappurangal. Kottayam: D C. ISBN 9788171305940.

=== Memoirs ===
- Jose C L (2015). Ente nadakajeevitham, Anubhavam. Thrissur: Green Books. ISBN 9788184234527.
- C. L. Jose (2014). Ormakalkku Urakkamilla. Sophia Books. ISBN 978-9381796849.

== Filmography ==
- Ariyatha Veethikal
- Bhoomiyile Malakha
- Agninakshathram

== See also ==
- List of Malayalam-language authors by category
- List of Malayalam-language authors
- 2017 Kerala Sahitya Akademi Awards
