= Panmana Ramachandran Nair =

Indian linguist

- Born: 13 August 1931; Panmana village, Travancore
- Died: 5 June 2018 (aged 86); Vazhuthacaud, Thiruvananthapuram, Kerala
- Occupation(s): Writer, critic, linguist, academic
- Spouse: K. N. Gomathi Amma
- Children: 3
- Parents: Kannakathu Kunchu Nair; Lakshmikkutty Amma
- Awards: Kendra Sahitya Academy Award; Kerala Sahitya Akademi Award for Overall Contributions

Prof. Panmana Ramachandran Nair (13 August 1931 – 5 June 2018) was a Malayalam language writer, translator, linguist and academic from Kerala, India. He has received Sahitya Akademi Translation Prize and Kerala Sahitya Akademi Award for Overall Contributions in the field of Malayalam literature. His autobiography Smrithi Rekhakal was published in 2010.

== Biography ==
Ramachandran Nair was born at Panmana village in Karunagappally Taluk of Kollam district on 13 August 1931 to Kannakathu Kunchu Nair who was a disciple of Chattampi Swamikal and Lakshmikutty Amma. He Studied till 10th in a Sanskrit school near Panmana Ashram. While still a student, he wrote poetry in Malayalam and Sanskrit and edited magazines. Sanskrit as his first language till 10th class, Hindi for Intermediate and then degree in Physics with Sanskrit as sub-language, he was initially rejected for pursuing a postgraduate degree in Malayalam from University College, Thiruvananthapuram. After a qualifying examination he joined the postgraduate degree, and passed masters in Malayalam with first rank in 1957. After post graduation, he started his teaching career at Fathima Matha College, Kollam. He later joined the government service as lecturer in Government Victoria College, Palakkad. After working as lecturer in government colleges in Chittoor, Thalassery and Thiruvananthapuram he retired from the service in 1987 as Head of the department of Malayalam in University College Thiruvananthapuram.

He was considered to be the last word in Malayalam grammatical nuances. His Malayalam Grammar books are authentic books that language students and journalists rely on for good language. He answered about 3,000 questions about the Malayalam language in a column in Career Magazine, which later became a book entitled Malayalavum Malayalikalum (Meaning: Malayalam and Malayalis). He wrote many articles on Malayalam language in all major newspapers and gave talks on radio and television also.

He was also active in the Granthasala prasthanam (library movement) and the Adyapakaprasthanam (teaching movement) and was the Chairman of the P.K. Parameswaran Nair Trust. He was a member of the committees of the Kerala State Library Council, Kerala Sahitya Akademi, the Kerala Kalamandalam and the Sahitya Pravarthaka Sahakaranasangham and the Kerala University Senate. The Trust, of which he is editor and mentor, has published 29 books in the last quarter century and has given awards to the best biographers.

He died in Vazhuthacaud on 5 June 2018 at the age of 86.

== Family ==
He and his wife K. N. Gomathi Amma have three children Hareendra Kumar, Mahendra Kumar and Usha Kumari.

== Contributions ==
=== Linguistic ===
- Thettillatha Malayalam (Meaning: Malayalam without mistakes)
- Thettum Shariyum (Meaning: right and wrong)
- Sudha Malayalam (Meaning: Pure Malayalam)
- Thetillatha Uchcharanam (Meaning: Pronunciation without mistakes)
- Bhasha Suddhi Samsaya Pariharangal (Meaning: Solutions to language purity doubts)
- Nalla bhasha (Meaning: good language)

=== Literary Review books ===
- Parichayam
- Navayugashilpi Rajaraja Varma

=== Vyakhyanas (commentaries) ===
- Nalacharitam Attakkatha
- Malayavilasam Kavyam

=== Children's literature ===
- Mazhavillu (Meaning: Rainbow)
- Oonjal (Meaning: Swing)
- Poonthen (Meaning: Honey)
- Appuppanum Kuttikalum (Meaning: Grandfather and Children)
- Deepashikha Kalidasan

=== Translations ===
- Acharya Choodamani
- Swapnavasavadattam
- Narayaniyam

=== Autobiography ===
- Smritirekhakal

== Awards and honors ==
- Sahitya Akademi Translation Prize for Narayaniyam into Malayalam.
- Kerala Sahitya Akademi Award for Overall Contributions 2004.
- Godhavarma Award for passing Malayalam Masters with first rank from University college, Thiruvananthapuram.
