= Mar Athanasius College of Engineering =

Indian college in Kerala

Mar Athanasius College of Engineering (MACE)
- Motto: Excellence in education through resource integration
- Type: Government Aided Engineering College Autonomous
- Established: 1961
- Affiliations: Universities (Since 1961): 1. APJ Abdul Kalam Technological University (Since 2015); 2. MG University (1983-2015); 3. University of Kerala (1961-1983)
- Principal: Dr. Bos Mathew Jos
- Location: Kothamangalam, Kerala, India
- Campus: 25.3 hectares/62.51 acres
- Nickname: MACE
- Website: www.mace.ac.in

Mar Athanasius College of Engineering (MACE) is a government aided engineering college located in Kothamangalam, Kerala state, India. The college is affiliated to the APJ Abdul Kalam Technological University. The University Grants Commission (UGC) has conferred autonomous status to the institution in 2023.

One of the five oldest engineering colleges in Kerala and one among the three gov-aided colleges, MACE was established in 1961 under Mar Athanasius College Association, and is approved by the AICTE. The college has six departments and two auxiliary departments (Mathematics and Humanities & Science). MACE has nearly 151 faculty, 3,050 students and 160 administrative and supporting staff.

The college provides Bachelor of Technology programs (Civil, Mechanical, Electrical, Electronics and Communication, Computer Science, Artificial Intelligence, Data Science), Master of Technology programs, Master of Computer Applications (MCA) and PhD programs. Students are admitted to the various programs from the rank lists published by the state/central Government (KEAM, DTE, GATE).

The college conducts a techfest called 'Takshak' and an arts and culture fest called 'Sanskriti'. The students of MACE are generally referred as MACEians. Student level technical clubs are very active in MACE. IEEE and ASME students have gained global level recognitions.

Beautiful campus of MACE occupies over 63 acres of land and is equipped with sports facilities of international standards. 50 meters swimming pool is a unique facility among them. MACE campus is located 1 kilometer from the Kothamangalam city, 30 kilometers from Aluva (AWY) railway station and 36 kilometers from Cochin International airport (COK).

== Governance ==
The Institution is the second venture of the Mar Athanasius College Association, the first being the arts and science college started in 1955. The Association also has Mar Athanasius International School and Mar Baselious College, Adimali, to its credit. Prof. M P Varghese had been at the reins from the time of founding.

There is a governing body separately for MACE consisting of representatives of the All India Council for Technical Education, the State Government, Mahatma Gandhi University, APJ Abdul Kalam Technological University, and Mar Athanasius College Association.

== Academic programs ==
=== Bachelor of Technology (B.Tech) ===
Candidates for admission to the B.Tech. Degree course shall be required to have passed the higher secondary/+2/XII Std. examination conducted by boards/departments recognized/accepted by the university, obtaining not less than 50% marks in Mathematics and not less than 50% marks in Mathematics, Physics and Chemistry put together or the diploma examination in Engineering, Kerala or any examination accepted by the government of Kerala as equivalent there to with 50% marks in the final qualifying examination, subject to the usual concession allowed for backward and other communities as specified from time to time. The college has the best accredited Mechanical engineering department in the entire state. Only the top five percentile in the Kerala Engineering Entrance Exam are able to secure a seat. The course takes a duration of 4 years with 8 semesters and it is approved by the Indian AICTE.

Seats

- Civil Engineering - 120
- Mechanical Engineering - 120
- Electrical & Electronics Engineering - 120
- Electronics & Communication Engineering - 120
- Computer Science and Engineering - 60
- Data Science - 60
- Artificial intelligence and Machine learning - 60

=== Master of Technology (M.Tech) ===
Seats

- Computer Science and Engineering (Computer Science) - 18
- Computer Aided Structural Engineering (Civil) - 18
- Production & Industrial Engineering (Mechanical) - 18
- Power Electronics (Electrical& Electronics) - 18
- VLSI (Electronics and Communication) - 18
- Thermal Power Engineering (Mechanical) - 24

=== Master of Computer Applications (M.C.A.) ===
The minimum qualification for admission is B.Sc. Comp. Sc, BCA or B.Sc. or B.Com. degree with Mathematics or Statistics as one of the subjects with not less than 55% marks, excluding languages, in the qualifying examination.

Candidates with B.Sc. Comp Sc, BCA, B.Sc/ B.Com. degree of the Mahatma Gandhi University or any other degree, accepted as equivalent there to by the Mahatma Gandhi University are alone eligible to apply.

The intake is 30.

== Student life ==
=== Sanskriti ===
Sanskriti is the annual national level cultural fest of Mar Athanasius College of Engineering Kothamangalam.

=== Takshak ===
Takshak is the annual national technical fest of Mar Athanasius College of Engineering Kothamangalam.

=== Innovation and Entrepreneurship Development Centre (IEDC MACE) ===
IEDC MACE is a flagship initiative of Kerala Startup Mission to promote innovation and entrepreneurial culture among the student and academic fraternity in the educational institutions and to develop institutional mechanisms to foster techno-entrepreneurship for generation of wealth and employment.

=== IEEE (Institution of Electrical and Electronics Engineers) ===
The IEEE MACE student chapter has received several awards from IEEE International, including the Darrel Chong Student Activity Award (Gold, 2022), a HAC/SIGHT Project grant of $4,844, and the IEEE MGA Outstanding Branch Chapter Advisor and Outstanding Branch Chapter Counselor awards, both in 2022.

=== American Society of Mechanical Engineers (ASME MACE) ===
ASME MACE student club is actively involved in the robotic/mechanical design challenges and is bringing international level recognitions to the MACE community. Recently ASME MACE achieved Global Rank 6 in extended reality challenge (XRC) and Global Rank 9 in Student Design Competition (SDC) during the Efest 2022 conducted by ASME. https://www.asmemace.in/

=== Society of Automotive Engineers (SAE MACE) ===
SAE MACE is a student club which is actively involved in the design and fabrication of automotive. Many of their automobile designs have gained national level recognitions.

=== Model United Nations (MACE MUN) ===
The legacy of MACE MUN began in 2014. The MACE MUN’21 was held with great triumph and valour in Mar Athanasius College of Engineering on the 4th and 5 December 2021. Around 137 delegates from various colleges participated in the event. Heated discussions and fiery debates were held in the various committees namely, the Kerala Legislative Assembly (KLA), UNGA- DISEC, and UNHRC and the event was covered by the International Press (IP).

=== Computer Society of India (CSI MACE) ===
The CSI MACE is an active association of students with computer science and programming minds. The broad spectrum of members is committed to advancing the theory and practice of Computer Engineering and Technology Systems, Science and Engineering, Information Processing, and related Arts and Sciences.

=== The MacePost ===
The MacePost is a student operated newsletter website of the college, managed and maintained entirely by the student community of the college. It was launched on 15 July 2013. It provides information on the activities of the various clubs and departments, as well as news of the alumni.

Since 2017 The Macepost and the Mar Athanasius have managed the annual MACE Model United Nations (MACE MUN) Conference, a two-days international game aimed to build up a blend of diplomacy, debating and display of leadership skills in the context of a reproduction of the UN committees and UN General Assembly. The event has involved around 60 delegates from various years and branches of the college, most of which were participating for the first time.

Extra curricular activities

MACE MUSIC CLUB

Mace Music Club aka MMC is the official music club of MACE. Students are given opportunity to showcase their talent in singing and playing various instruments.

MACE DANCE CLUB

Abbreviated as MadC, is the official dance club comprising students from MACE. The Outclass Crew is a part of MadC which consists of selected members from MadC who are trained under professional choreographers.

DIVAAT

It is the official fashion club of Mar Athanasius College of Engineering.

ENCIDE

ENCIDE is a technical club focusing mainly on coding and tech related events, conducting its flagship event "Vibethon" every year. This club comes under the department of Computer Science and Engineering.

== Controversy ==
Following the death of a student in August 2026, the college became the epicenter of intense student protests over its academic policies.Michi Marpu, a 20-year-old third-year Civil Engineering student from Naharlagun, Arunachal Pradesh, died by suicide in his rented room on August 15, 2026. Peer students and student organizations alleged that Marpu faced severe emotional distress due to the college's rigid "year-back" academic credit system.As an autonomous institution, the MACE administration had independently mandated a strict 22-credit threshold for promotion from the fourth to the fifth semester. This policy contrasted with the baseline requirement set by the APJ Abdul Kalam Technological University (KTU) for other affiliated colleges in Kerala, which required only 18 credits. Students claimed that this heightened requirement was implemented without proper prior notification, and they only discovered the rule change when affected names were missing from the published fifth-semester roll lists.Led by student unions including the Students' Federation of India (SFI) and the Kerala Students Union (KSU), hundreds of students launched a massive blockade of the college gates demanding structural accountability, policy overhauls, and compensation for Marpu's family. Following days of agitation, the college management officially conceded to the students' demands on August 18, 2026. The administration agreed to lower the year-back threshold back to the university-standard 18 credits, reduce supplementary examination fees, provide financial assistance to Marpu's family, and initiate an internal inquiry committee excluding the college principal and the head of the civil engineering department to ensure transparency

== Sports ==
- Swimming Pool (50m)
- Football Ground
- Cricket Ground with Practice Nets
- Indoor and outdoor Badminton Courts
- Basketball courts
- Tennis court
- Volleyball court
- Gymnasium
- Table Tennis

== Student Hostels ==
Most of the students at MACE are residing at college hostels. Separate hostels are provided for boys and girls and each hostel has attached dining facilities.

== Notable alumni ==
- Muhammad Ajmal Variyathodi, Indian Athletic, Arjuna Award holder in 2026
- Dr. S Unnikrishnan Nair - Director, Vikram Sarabhai Space Centre, Thiruvananthapuram
- Murali Thummarukudy - Chief of Disaster Risk Reduction in the UN Environment Programme
- V. K Matthews - Founder chairman IBS software services
- Ranjith Sankar - Malayalam screenwriter and film director
- Arun Alat - Malayalam language singer
- T. G. Ravi - Actor
- Dr. K. Poulose Jacob - Academician, Ex-Pro Vice Chancellor, Cochin University of Science & Technology
- Niranj Suresh - Playback Singer
- Thampi Antony - Indian-American film actor, writer, activist and producer

=== Alumni association ===
MACE Alumni Association (MACEAA) has nine chapters — seven abroad and two in India. Around 8000 (all old students, final-year students and teaching staff of MACE) are members of MACEAA.

== See also ==
- Mar Athanasius College
- NSS College of Engineering
- Thangal Kunju Musaliar College of Engineering
