= Kerala Sahitya Akademi Award for Drama =

The Kerala Sahitya Akademi Award for Drama is given every year by the Kerala Sahitya Akademi (Kerala Literary Academy) to a Malayalam writer for writing a drama of literary merit. It is one of the twelve categories of the Kerala Sahitya Akademi Award.

== Awardees ==
Year	Book	Author	Image
1958	Azhimukhathekku	N. Krishna Pillai	
1959	Mudiyanaya Puthran	Thoppil Bhasi	
1960	Puthiya Akasam Puthiya Bhumi	Thoppil Bhasi	
1961	Iblisukalude Naattil	N. P. Chellappan Nair	
1962	Kanchana Sita	C. N. Sreekantan Nair	
1963	Kakkapponnu	S. L. Puram Sadanandan	
1964	Rail Palangal	G. Sankara Pillai	
1965	Kafir	K. T. Muhammed	
1966	Prethalokam	N. N. Pillai	
1967	Swathi Thirunal	Kainikkara Padmanabha Pillai	
1968	Pulivaal	P. K. Veeraraghavan Nair	
1969	U. D. Clarke	P. Gangadharan Nair	
1970	Mathruka Manushyan	Kainikkara Kumara Pillai	
1971	Ahalya	P. R. Chandran	
1972	Pralayam	Omchery N. N. Pillai	
1973	Kuppikkalukal	P. V. Kuriakose	
1974	Chaverppada	Aziz	
1975	Nadaka Chakram	Kavalam Narayana Panicker	
1976	Samasya	K. S. Namboothiri	
1977	Vishwaroopam	Surasu	
1978	Jwalanam	C. L. Jose	
1979	Sakshi	T. N. Gopinathan Nair	
1980	Jathugriham	Vaikom Chandrasekharan Nair	
1981	Perumthachan	T. M. Abraham	
1982	Gopuranadayil	M. T. Vasudevan Nair	
1983	Agni	Vayala Vasudevan Pillai	
1984	Nikumbhila	Kadavoor G. Chandran Pillai	
1985	Souparnika	Narendra Prasad	
1986	Dakshinayanam	T. P. Sukumaran	
1987	Moonnu Vayassanmar	C. P. Rajasekharan	
1988	Pulijanmam	N. Prabhakaran	
1989	Paavam Usman	P. Balachandran	
1990	Swathi Thirunal	Pirappancode Murali	
1991	Abhimatham	Vasu Pradeep	
1992	Mandelakku Snehapoorvam Winny	P. M. Antony	
1993	Mounam Nimitham	N. N. Ganesh	
1994	Narabhojikal	Paravur George	
1995	Samathalam	Mullanezhi	
1996	Madhya Dharanazhi	Joy Mathew	
1997	Rajasabha	Ibrahim Vengara	
1998	Gandhi	K. Satchidanandan	
1999	Vanibham	N. Sasidharan	
2000	Che Guevara	Karivellur Murali	
2001	Padaprashnangalkkidayil Avalum Ayaalum	Satheesh K. Satheesh	
2002	Amaravati Sub-treasury	Sreemoolanagaram Mohan	
2003	Vannanthye Kaanaam	Thuppettan	
2004	Viralppadu	Sri Janardhanan	
2005	Ororo Kaalathilum	Sreeja K. V.	
2006	Sadrisha Vakyangal	C. Gopan	
2007	Dravida Nritham	Francis T. Mavelikkara	
2008	Pathinettu Natakangal	Jayaprakash Kuloor	
2009	Swathanthryam Thanne Jeevitham	K. M. Raghavan Nambiar	
2010	Maram Peyyunnu	A. Santha Kumar	
2011	Cholliyattam	Balasubrahmanian	
2012	Mariman Kanni	M. N. Vinayakumar	
2013	Jinnu Krishnan	Rafeekh Mangalassery	
2014	Ettettu Malayalan	V. K. Prabhakaran	
2015	Mathi	Jino Joseph	
2016	Lalla	Samkutty Pattomkary	
2017	Swadeshabhimani	S. V. Venugopan Nair	
2018	Choottum Koottum	Rajmohan Neeleswaram	
2019	Arangile Mathsyagandhikal	Sajitha Madathil	
2019	Eli Eli Lama Sabaktani	Jisha Abhinaya	
2020	Dwayam	Sreejith Poyilkkavu	
2021	Namukku Jeevitham Parayam	Pradeep Mandur	
2022	Kumaru	Emil Madhavi	
2023	E for Oedipus	Gireesh P. C.	
2024	Pithalashalabham	Sasidharan Naduvil	
