= Iyyamcode Sreedharan =

Indian Malayalam language writer

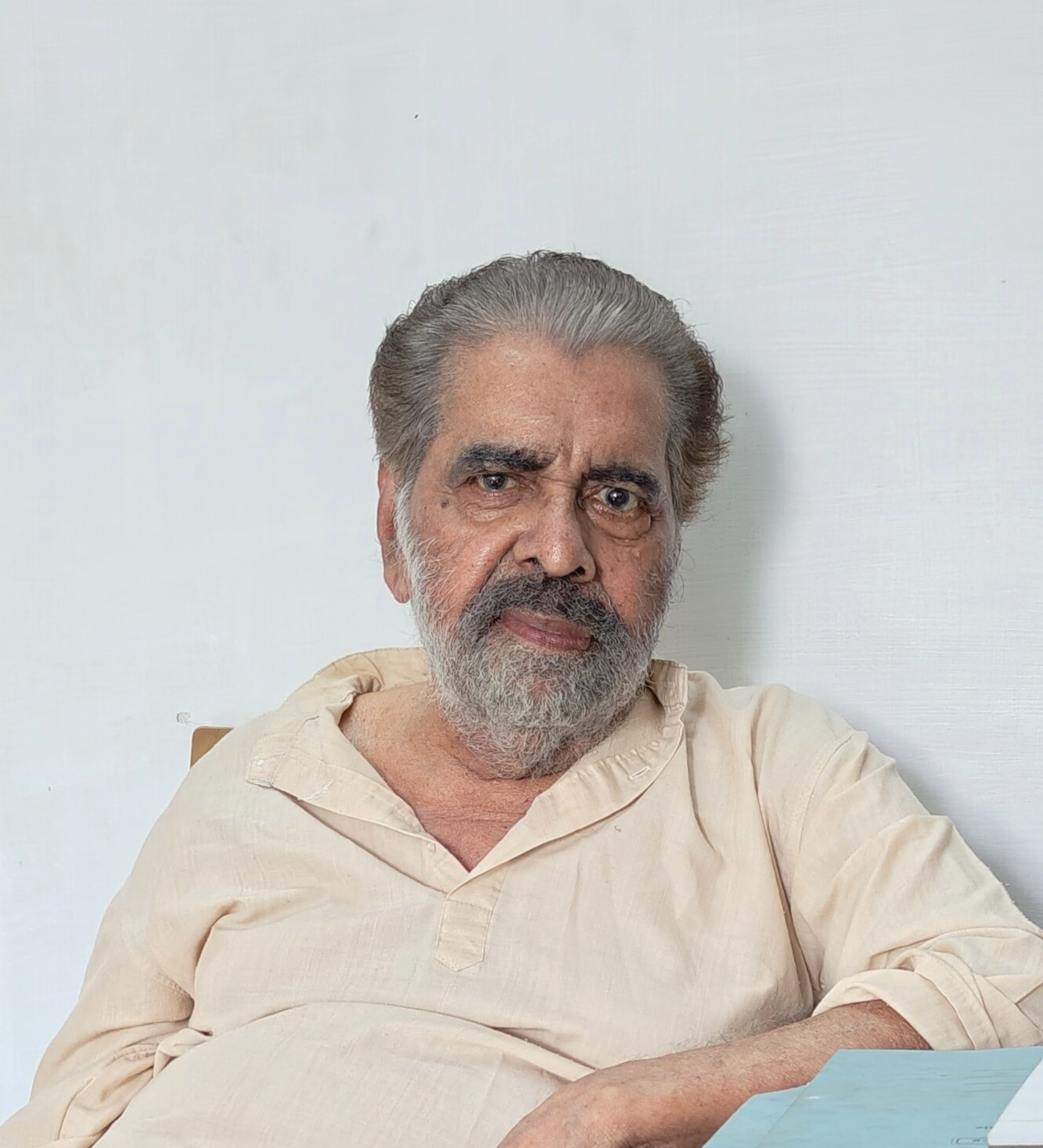
- Born: Sreedharan; 4 July 1941 (age 85); Iyyamcode near Nadapuram, Malabar district, British India
- Citizenship: India
- Occupations: Writer, Playwright
- Spouse: Komalavalli
- Children: 3 including S. K. Kavitha
- Parent(s): M. Narayana Kurup; M. P. Karthayani Amma
- Writing career
- Genres: Travelogue, Poetry, Short story, Biography
- Notable awards: Kerala Sahitya Akademi Award for Overall Contributions; Kerala Sahithya Akademi Award for travelogue Kerala Kalamandalam Mukundaraja Award; Kerala Kalamandalam M. K. K. Nair Award

Iyyamcode Sreedharan (also spelled as Iyyamkode or Iyyamkodu) is a Malayalam language writer from Kerala, India. He is well known in various fields of literature, such as a travelogue writer, Aattakkatha writer, playwright, poet and biographer. He received several awards, including Kerala Sahitya Akademi Award for Overall Contributions, Kerala Sahitya Akademi Award for travelogue, Kerala Kalamandalam Mukundaraja Award, and Kerala Kalamandalam Award for outstanding contribution in the field of literature.

== Biography ==
Sreedharan was born on 4 September 1941, in Puthiya veettil House in Iyyamcode near Nadapuram in the present-day Kozhikode district of Kerala. His father, M. Narayana Kurup, was a teacher, poet, painter and, sculptor. His mother, M. P. Karthayani Amma, is the sister of M. P. Narayanan Nambiar, a prominent leader of the Karshaka Sangham, a long-time farmers' movement in Kerala. He had his primary education at Nadapuram C.C. UP School. After passing tenth class from Kadathanad Rajas High School in Kozhikode District, he studied Kathakali chamayam (makeup of Kathakali artists) for three years at the Kerala Kalamandalam in Cheruthuruthy. In 1961, he joined Kollankode Rajas High School in Palakkad district as a teacher in Kathakali chamayam and later became a descendant of poet P. Kunhiraman Nair, who was a colleague there.

Sreedharan started writing poems at the age of fifteen. In 1962, he won the first prize in the Mathrubhumi Weekly poetry competition for students. Subsequently, in 1964, he was awarded the Kerala Sahitya Samithi Poetry Award. He brought together theatre artists from Kollengode and the surrounding areas, and formed a theater troupe in 1975 and performed plays all over Kerala.

He was instrumental in establishing the P. Smaraka Kalakendram (P. Memorial Art Center) at Kollengode in 1981, in memory of the poet P. Kunhiraman Nair. Iyyamcode has been the secretary of the art centre for the last forty years. In 1988, when he was the secretary of the Kerala Kalamandalam, he formed a Kathakali group named Kerala Kalabhavan and wrote three aattakkathas, including 'Kinglier', and performed in many stages, including in foreign countries.

Iyankode Sreedharan, who has been one of the directors of the Kerala Institute of Children's Literature, held several other positions, including member of the Kerala Sahitya Samithi and the Vice President of the Kerala Sangeetha Nataka Akademi. He was a member of the Board of Directors of the Kerala Sahitya Akademi for seven years and was the state secretary of the Purogamana Kala Sahitya Sangh, a group of progressive literary activists. He represented India in the World Ramayana Festival.

=== Personal life ===
He and his wife, Komalavalli, have 3 children. His daughter S. K. Kavitha is a Malayalam language poet. They live in their house 'Sakalya' in Vattekatte near Kollengode in Palakkad district.

== Literary works ==
=== Poetry collection ===
- Mulakinkodi
- Njattu Paattu
- Perumbara
- Jaya He
- Sakshi Mozhi
- Patiyirangunna Daivam
- Sangha Ganam
- Njan Itha Padunnu Veendum

=== Short story collection ===
- Nizhalukalude Nritham (in Malayalam). Prabhatham Publishers. 2016.
- Thalam Thettiya Kalaasangal

=== Novels ===
- Chuvanna Theruvu (in Malayalam). Sahithya Pravarthaka Co-operative Society. 1977.
- Varum Thirichuvarum (in Malayalam). Mythri Books. 1 January 2012.
- Vanadevatha (in Malayalam). Sahithya Pravarthaka Co-operative Society. 1968. Archived from the original on 31 January 2022.
- Vadamallika
- Appunni

=== Memoirs ===
- V K N Kalari (in Malayalam). National Book Stall. 2012. ISBN 9789382654711. Memoirs about V. K. N.
- Ormayile Sugandam (in Malayalam). Kerala Sahithya Akademi. 2012.
- Ormakalile Sancharam (in Malayalam). UnmaPublications. May 2010.
- Ormayile Kalamandalam (in Malayalam). National Book Stall. November 2015.
- Varna Renukkal
- Mayil Peelikal
- Ormayile Mandasmeram
- Ornmayile Madhuryam

=== Essays and studies ===
- Hinduthwam Enna Avastha (in Malayalam). Chintha Publications. October 2016. ISBN 9789386112880.
- Kalathinte Kalochakal (in Malayalam). Melinda Books. June 2015.
- Kochukochu Varthamanangal
- Snehadarasamanwitham

=== Dance Dramas ===
- Malanadu
- Kavikal Paadiya Keralam

=== Biographies ===
- Changampuzha (in Malayalam). Mythri books. 2017. ISBN 9780000105370. Biography of Changampuzha Krishna Pillai
- Vallathol (in Malayalam). Mythri books. 2017. ISBN 9780000105431. Biography of Vallathol Narayana Menon
- P Kunhiraman Nair (in Malayalam). Mythri books. 2017. ISBN 9780000105462. Biography of P. Kunhiraman Nair
- Kunchan Nambiar (in Malayalam). Mythri books. March 2012. Biography of Kunchan Nambiar
- Azhikode Enna Anubhavam (in Malayalam) (2 ed.). National Book Stall. ISBN 9789388597517. Based on the life of Sukumar Azhikode
- Cherukadu ezhuthum karuthum. Kerala Sahithya Akademi. 2010. Based on the life of Cherukad
- Swapnadanam, based on the life of P. Kunhiraman Nair.

=== Plays ===
- Ore vargam Ore margam
- Ithile
- Padayottam

=== Aattakkathas ===
- Manava Vijayam
- Sneha Sandesam
- King Lear, adaptation of William Shakespeare's play King Lear

=== Studies and research ===
- Kathakali Vicharam. National Book Stall. 2011. ISBN 9780000186393.

=== Travelogues ===
- King Lierinte Europyan Sanchara Padangal
- Ethra Ethra Ramayanangal. Deshabhimani. 2000. In this book, Ramayana from fourteen countries of the world, including Uzbekistan, the Philippines, and Vietnam is mentioned.
- Spain Oru Ottapradakshinam.

== Books on him ==
- Surendran, V. U. (2018). Iyyankodinte lokam (in Malayalam). Seed Books. ISBN 9788193697962.
- P, Kunhiraman Nair (2009). Hridayam Thurakkunna Thakkolukal (First ed.). Tiruvanthapuram: Melinda Books. ISBN 9788188420681. Letters of Mahakavi P. Kunjiraman Nair to Iyyancode Sreedharan
- Kalppadukal part 2 titled as Puram, S. K. Vasanthan's memoirs of friendships and cordial interactions with notable personalities including, Sreedharan.

== Awards and honors ==
- Kerala Sahitya Akademi Award for Overall Contributions 2016.
- Kerala Sahitya Akademi Award 2008 for his travelogue King Lierinte Europyan Sanchara Padangal
- Kerala Kalamandalam M. K. K. Nair Award for outstanding contribution in the field of literature.
- Kerala Kalamandalam 'Mukundaraja Award' for his contributions to Kathakali.
- Abu Dhabi Sakthi Award 1997- for poetry collection Sanghaganam.
- Arts Service International Book Development Committee Award, Paris- for his Aattakkatha King Lear
- UNESCO Member International Book Committee Award- for his biography, Swapnadanam.
- The first literary award was instituted by the Professor P. Meerakutty Foundation for his autobiography, Swapnadanam.
- First Kaliyachan Award instituted by Cheruthuruthy Kathakali School in memory of P. Kunhiraman Nair.
- K. P. Kesava Menon Award
- First prize in the Mathrubhumi Weekly poetry competition for students, 1962
- Kerala Sahitya Samithi Poetry Award 1964
