= P. K. Parakkadavu =

Indian writer

P. K. Ahamed Parakkadavu
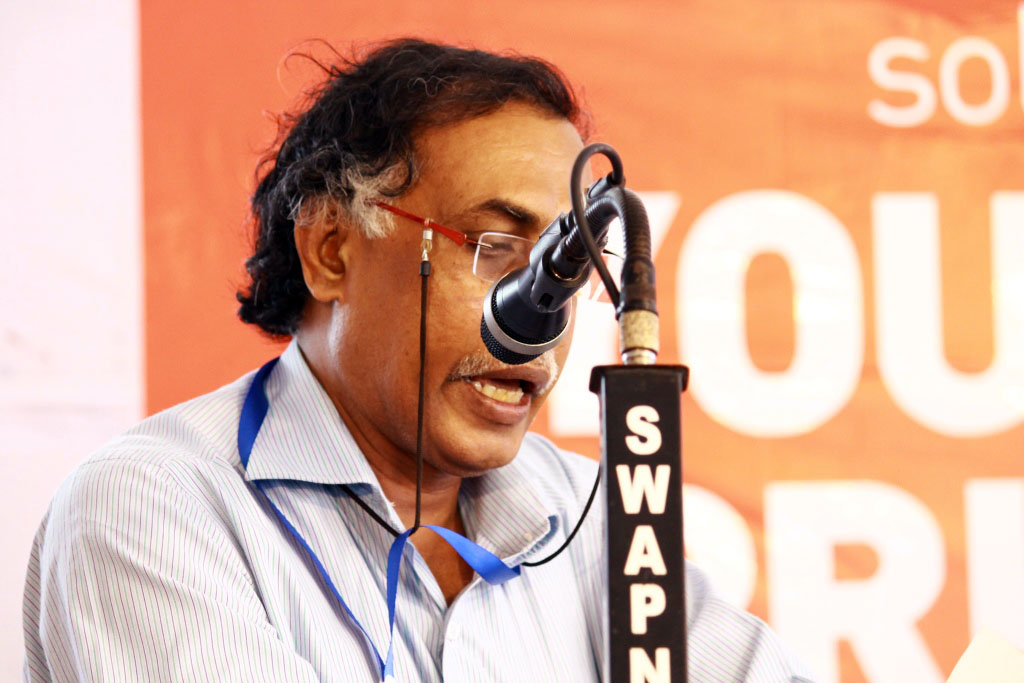
- Born: Ponnamkotte Ahmad; 15 October 1952 (age 73); Parakkadavu, Vadakara, Calicut
- Citizenship: Indian
- Education: Farook College, Calicut
- Spouse: Zebunnisa
- Relatives: Hassan and Mariyam (parents) Athira Sameer and Anuja Mirshad (children)
- Writing career
- Pen name: P. K. Parakkadavu
- Language: Malayalam
- Notable awards: Kerala Sahitya Akademi Award

P. K. Parakkadavu (Pi. Ke Pār̲akkaṭav) is an Indian writer from Kerala. He was one of the recipients of the 2016 Kerala Sahitya Akademi Awards for overall contribution.

== Early life ==
He was born on October 15, 1952, to Ponnankodu Hassan and Maryam in Parakkadavu near Vadakara in Calicut district. He completed his education from Farook College and migrated to the Persian Gulf region for a while to find work. He was the Periodicals Editor of the Madhyamam Daily and the Director of Editorial Relations. He has published 45(forty five)books and some of them have been translated into English, Hindi, Arabic, Marathi, Tamil and Telugu. He is a member of the General Council of the Sahitya Akademi and the executive committee of the Kerala Sahitya Akademi and the Samastha Kerala Sahitya Parishad. After the murder of writers including Kalburgi, he resigned from Sahitya Akademi to protest against the silence of the central government and the Akademi.

== Partial list of works ==
- Mounathinte Nilavili
- Guruvum Njanum
- Khor Fakkan Kunnu
- Prakasha Naalam
- Manassinte Vathilukal
- Njayarazhcha Nireekshanangal
- Murivetta Vakkukal
- Pranayathinte Nanarthangal
- Parakkadavinte Kathakal
- Iratti Mittayikal
- Thiranjedutha Kathakal
- Idiminnalukalude Pranayam
