= Kerala Kalamandalam =

Art school in Thrissur, India

- കേരള കലാമണ്ഡലം
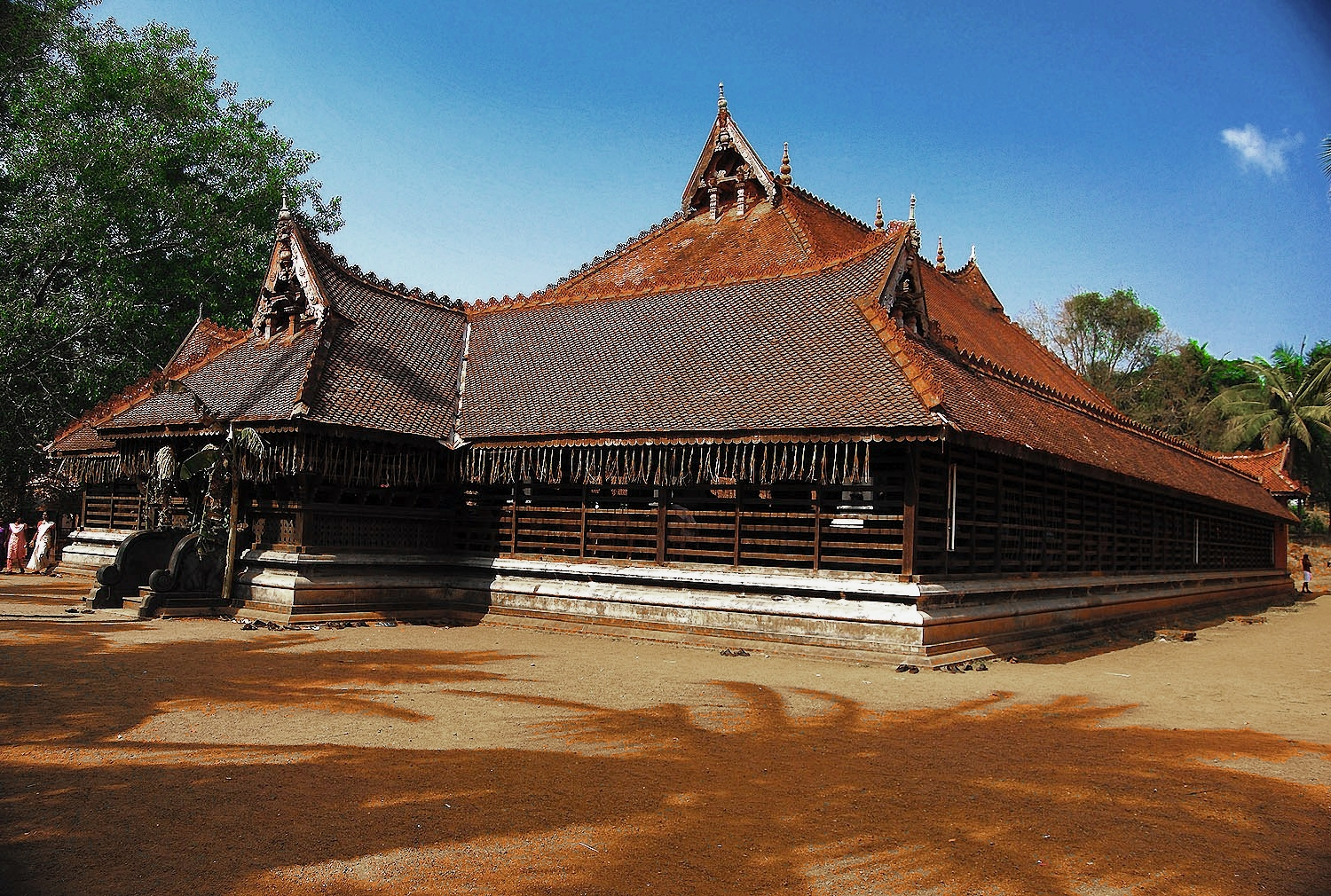
- A view of Koothambalam at Kerala Kalamandalam
- Former name: Kerala Kalamandalam
- Motto: Design a strong system of education in the traditional way imbibing the spirit of enlightenment of the new age
- Type: Public
- Established: 1930; 96 years ago
- Founder: Vallathol Narayana Menon
- Chancellor: Dr. Mallika Sarabhai
- Vice-Chancellor: B. Ananthakrishnan
- Location: Cheruthuruthi, Thrissur District, Kerala, India; 10.737598°N 76.277087°E
- Nickname: Kerala Kalamandalam
- Website: kalamandalam.ac.in

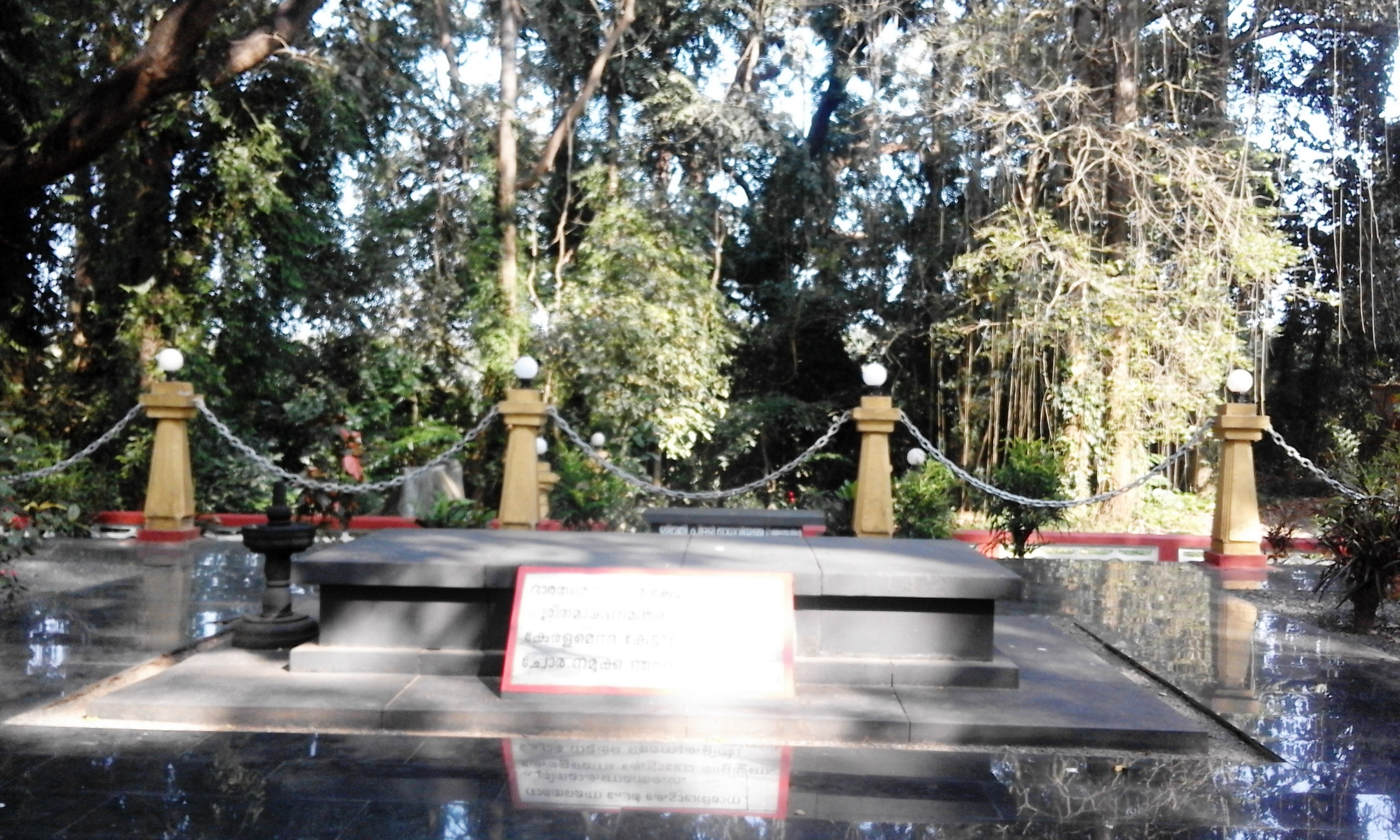
Vallathol Samadhi

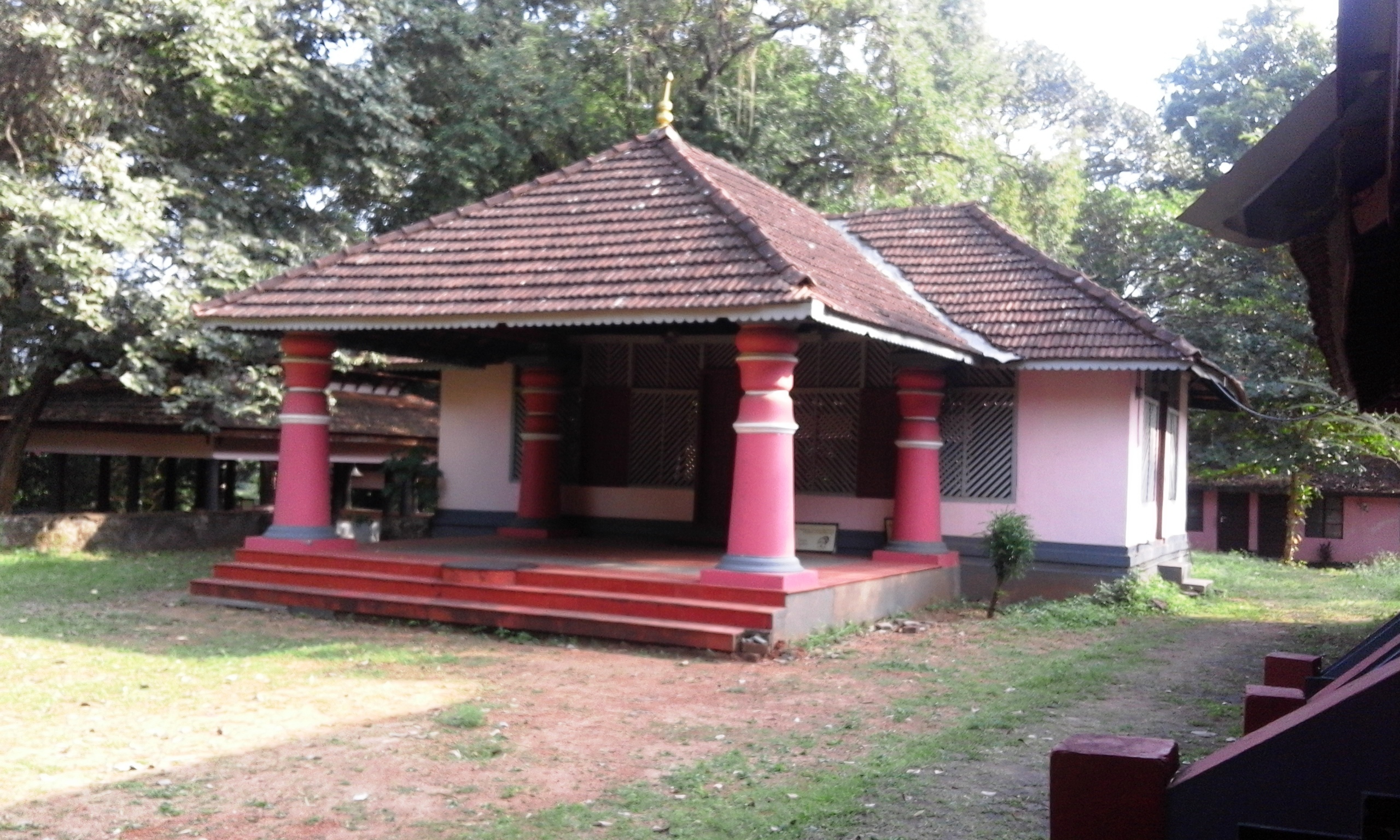
Old Campus now used as the P.G.campus

Kerala Kalamandalam, a deemed-to-be-University of Art and Culture by the Government of India, is a major centre for learning Indian performing arts, especially those that developed in the country's southern states, with special emphasis on those from Kerala. The institution, on the banks of the Bharathapuzha river, is situated in the small town of Cheruthuruthi in Thrissur district.

== History ==
The inception of Kalamandalam gave a second life to three major classical performing arts of Kerala, bringing out Kathakali, Kudiyattam and Mohiniyattam from a state of near-extinction in the early 20th century. Amidst its abyss, in 1927, poet Vallathol Narayana Menon and art-promoter Mukunda Raja came forward and formed a society called Kerala Kalamandalam. They solicited donations from the public and conducted a lottery in order to raise funds for this society.

Kerala Kalamandalam was inaugurated in November 1930 at Kakkad house in Kunnamkulam, and was, six months later shifted to Ambalapuram near Mulakunnathukavu before eventually moved onto the village of Cheruthuruthy, just south of Shoranur, in 1936. The Maharaja of Cochin donated the land and a building. Subsequently, a dance department was started to revive Mohiniyattom.

Kerala Kalamandalam has been functioning as a grant-in-aid institution under the Cultural Affairs Department, Government of Kerala. In 2006, the Kalamandalam was accorded the status of 'Deemed University for Art and Culture' by the Government of India. In 2010, University Grants Commission (India) has given 'A' category status for Kerala Kalamandalam. Kalamandalam is the only deemed university in Kerala state accorded the prestigious status.

== Visits by prime ministers ==
The first Prime Minister to visit Kerala Kalamandalam is Jawaharlal Nehru in 1955 for the Silver Jubilee of the Kerala Kalamandalam. Indira Gandhi was the second Prime Minister to visit Kerala Kalamandalam in 1980 and V. P. Singh in 1990. Manmohan Singh is the fourth Prime Minister to visit Kerala Kalamandalam in September 2012.

== Courses ==
Kalamandalam imparts training in classical dance and theatre forms like Kathakali, Mohiniyattam, Kudiyattam, Thullal, Kuchipudi, Bharatanatyam, and Nangiar Koothu, besides the traditional orchestra called Panchavadyam. Training is also given in various percussion instruments like chenda, maddalam and mizhavu. Kalamandalam follows the gurukula sampradayam, the ancient Indian education system based on residential tutelage. Kalamandalam was conceived to provide training to its students in the Gurukula Sampradaya, an ancient tradition of residential schooling where students stayed with the teachers. The first vice chancellor of Kerala Kalamandalam was K G Paulose (2007) and the last chairman of Kerala Kalamandalam was O.N.V.Kurup. Present vice chancellor is M V Narayanan.

== Former chairpersons ==
The following is a list of Chairpersons/Vice chancellors of Kerala kalamandalam.

Chairman/Vice chancellor	Period
Vallathol Narayana Menon	1930- 1958
Komattil Achyutha Menon	1959 - 1961
K. N. Pisharody	1962- 1967
M. K. K. Nair	1967 -1971
D. H. Nambudirippad	1971 -1976
K. M. Kannanmpally	1976 -1978
Olappamanna Subrahmanyan Namboodirippad	1978 -1984
T. B. M. Nedungadi	1984 - 1987
K. V. Kochaniyan	1987 - 1991
Olappamanna Subramanyan Namboodirippad	1991 -1993
V. S. Sarma	1993 -1996
O. N. V. Kurup	1996 -2001
V. R. Prabodhachandran Nayar	2001 -2006
O. N. V. Kurup	2006 - 2007
Dr. K. G. Paulose	2007 - 2010
Dr. J. Prasad	2010 - 2011
Shri. P.N. Suresh	2011 - 2016
Dr. M.C. Dileep Kumar	2016 - 2017
Smt. Rani George IAS	2017 - 2018
Dr. T.K. Narayanan	2018 - 2022
Dr. M.V. Narayanan	2022 - 2023
Dr. B. Ananthakrishnan	2023 -

The Government of India, on the advice of the University Grants Commission declared Keralakalamandalam as deemed University as per order No. F9 -11/99 U3 dated 14-03-2006. The Government of Kerala approved the Memorandum of Association and Rules and subsequently the title "Chairman" was substituted by "Vice-Chancellor" (since 2007)

== See also ==
- Panchavadyam
- Kerala Folklore Akademy
- List of Kerala State Government Organizations
