= K. K. Kochu =

Indian writer (1949–2025)

- Born: 2 February 1949; Kallara, Kerala, India
- Died: 13 March 2025 (aged 76); Kerala, India
- Occupations: Writer; social activist
- Awards: Kerala Sahitya Akademi Award for Overall Contributions (2020)

K. K. Kochu (2 February 1949 – 13 March 2025) was an Indian Dalit thinker, writer and social activist. He received the 2020 Kerala Sahitya Akademi Award for Overall Contributions.

== Biography ==
Kochu was born on 2 February 1949, at Kallara in Kottayam District. His autobiography Dalitan is his most notable work. His other works include Budhanilekkulla Dooram, Desheeyathakkoru CharithrapaaTam, Keralacharithravum Samooharoopeekaranavum, Dalith Nerkkazchakal, Idathupakshammillatha Kaalam, Vaayanayude Dalit PaaTam, Dalith samudayavaadavum Samudayika rashtreeyavum and Kalapavum Samskaravum. Kochu died from cancer in Kerala on 13 March 2025, at the age of 76.
