= P. C. Sanal Kumar =

Indian satirist (1949–2014)

P. C. Sanal Kumar (19 June 1949 – 8 November 2014) was an Indian satirist who wrote in Malayalam. He won the Kerala Sahitya Academy Award in 2004.

== Published work ==
- Venal Pookal (novel, 1987)
- Collector Kadha Ezhuthukayanu (Kerala Sahitya Academy Award 2004)
- Paradeeyam (collection of parodies)
- Oomakkathinu Uriyada Marupadi
- Oru Clue Tharumo
- Ningal Kyoovilaanu
