= Kallara =

Kottayam Kallara, Kottayam
- Town
- Interactive map of Kottayam Kallara, Kottayam
- Coordinates: 9.3°N 76.66°E
- Country: India
- State: Kerala
- District: Kottayam

Area
  - Total: 94.88 km^{2} (36.63 sq mi)
- Elevation: 0 m (0 ft)

Languages
  - Official: Malayalam, English
- Time zone: UTC+5:30 (IST)
- PIN: 686611
- Telephone code: 04829
- Vehicle registration: KL-36
- Coastline: 0 kilometres (0 mi)
- Sex ratio: 1.017 ♂/♀
- Literacy: 100.0%%
- Climate: Am (Köppen)
- Precipitation: 2,743 millimetres (108.0 in)

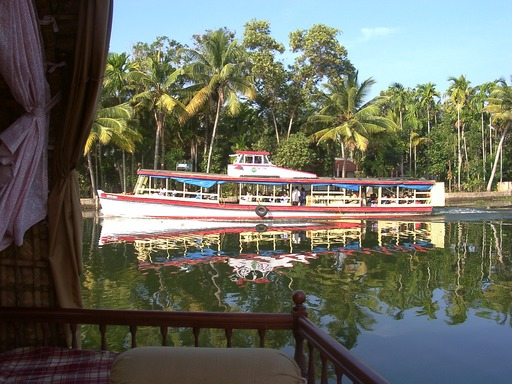
Tours on Kallara's backwaters like this one are common.

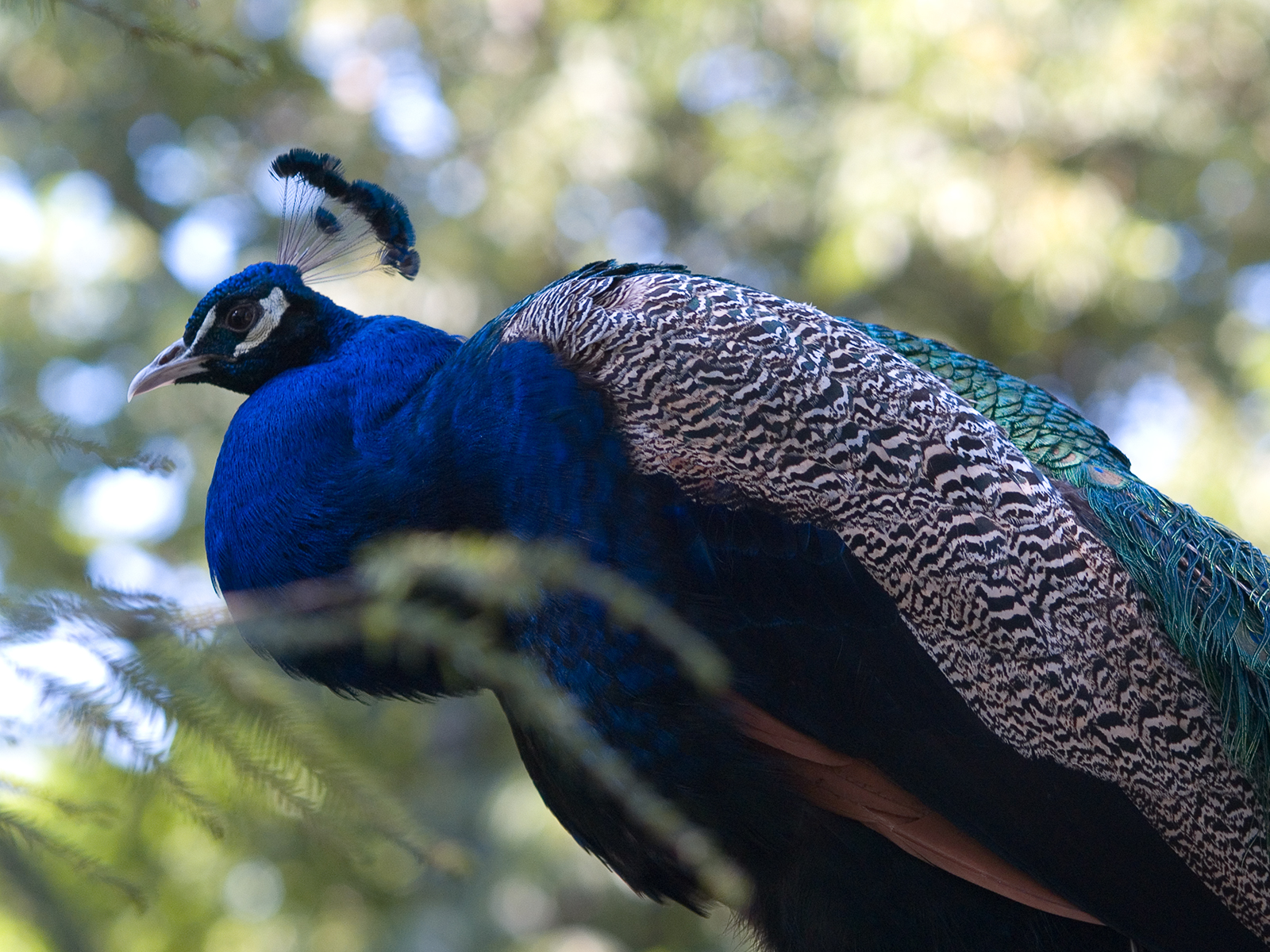
An Indian Peacock.

Kallara is a small town in the Kottayam district of Kerala, India. Kottayam is located 10 km (6.2 mi) to the south.

== History ==
The name Kallara came from the word "kallukaludae Ara". The history of Kallara dates back to the first ever temple or devasthana called Pandavar Kulangara Sreekrishna Swamy Kshetram and Kallara Kavu. It is widely believed that this temple was consecrated by Pancha Pandavar with the prime deity Krishna and that is the etymology of its name. Another main temple is Sree Sarada Temple. The reigning deity is Goddess Saraswathi, the goddess of knowledge.

Fr. Thomas Viruthiyil constructed a road with the help of villagers through paddy fields, now called Achan Road, which provides access from Ettumannor and Palai.

== Landmarks and facilities ==
A prominent landmark is Kallara Chantha.

Kallara also has many churches of various denominations.

The main schools at Kallara are: S.M.V NSS High School, S.M.V Govt.L.P.School, S.S.V.U.P School, St. Thomas High School, Govt.S.K.V.U.P.S Perumthuruth, Govt.L.P.School Kallara South, Govt.H.W.L.P.S Kallara, St. Savior's L.P.S. Paravanthuruth and Sr.Savio Public School

== Climate and geography ==
Kallara has similar tropical climate as the rest of the state of Kerala. The average temperature in the warmest months is about 33 °C and for colder months is 22 °C. The humidity is very high and can rise to about 90% during the monsoon seasons. During December, January and February winter temperature comes falls to around 15 °C. March, April and May, the summer months, the temperature can rise to about 36 °C.

The yearly total rainfall varies from 2500 mm and 1500 mm. Kallara is affected by the Arabian Sea branch of the Southwest Monsoons and the Northeast Monsoons (albeit quite less compared to the other). The Southwest monsoon extends from June to August and the Northeast monsoon extends from October to November. Flash floods occur every once in a while, especially during the Southwest Monsoon. The town is indented with numerous creeks and lakes, and is covered with lush greenery, rich in biodiversity. Kallara is mainly divided regionally into Perumthuruth, Paravanthuruth and Kallara.

== Economy ==
Agriculture is the main industry in Kallara. Acres of paddy fields are distributed throughout Kallara. The rubber latex industry is one of the prominent industries in the village. In addition to rubber latex, other industries are also now growing rapidly including gold and textile retailing, seafood and spices, health services, banking, and the fishing industry are among some of them. The town's economy has an emphasis on the service sector. Information technology is also becoming more essential. As the Government of Kerala is promoting the construction of Infoparks. Kallara is very rapidly industrialising because of its growth in these industries.

Tourism is also another growing industry. The vast backwaters of Kerala are one of the most visited areas, linked to the vast chain of rivers in Kerala. Traditional cargo boats called kettuvallams are modified into cruise boats and house boats often roam the backwaters giving tourists a view of Kallara's scenery.

== Flora and fauna ==
Kallara has a very large variety of animals and plants. Many medicinal plant can be found all throughout Kallara. Tropical wet evergreen and semi-evergreen forests make up much of the plants that grow in Kallara. Many trees such as the anjili, rosewood, and cassia grow all throughout Kallara. Abundant flora such as bamboo, aromatic vetiver grass, black pepper, calamus rattan palm and the lotus can be seen all over Kallara.

== Notable people ==
- K K Kochu (born 1949), Indian Dalit thinker, writer and social activist
