= E. Vasu =

Indian writer

E. Vasu is a Malayalam language writer from Kerala state, South India. Best known for his 1966 novel Chuvappunada, Vasu has written about forty works, including novels, short stories, travelogues and essays.

== Biography ==
E. Vasu was born in 1935, in Naduvattom in Kozhikode district, to Chanthukkutty and Unnooli. He had his formal schooling from Beypore and Feroke high schools. He obtained a higher diploma in co-operation and a bachelor's degree in Economics. He started his professional career as a government employee and worked in various departments such as Agriculture, Co-operation, Development etc. Vasu made a mark for himself as a novelist with Chuvappunada (Redtape, 1966) which brought out the red-tapism of the governmental machinery. Vasu has written about forty literary works, including novels, short stories, travelogues and essays. He also served as the Rural Information Bureau Chief Officer and the editor of Janapatham, a journal published by the Public Relations Department of Kerala government.
