= Muralee Thummarukudy =

United Nations official (born 1964)

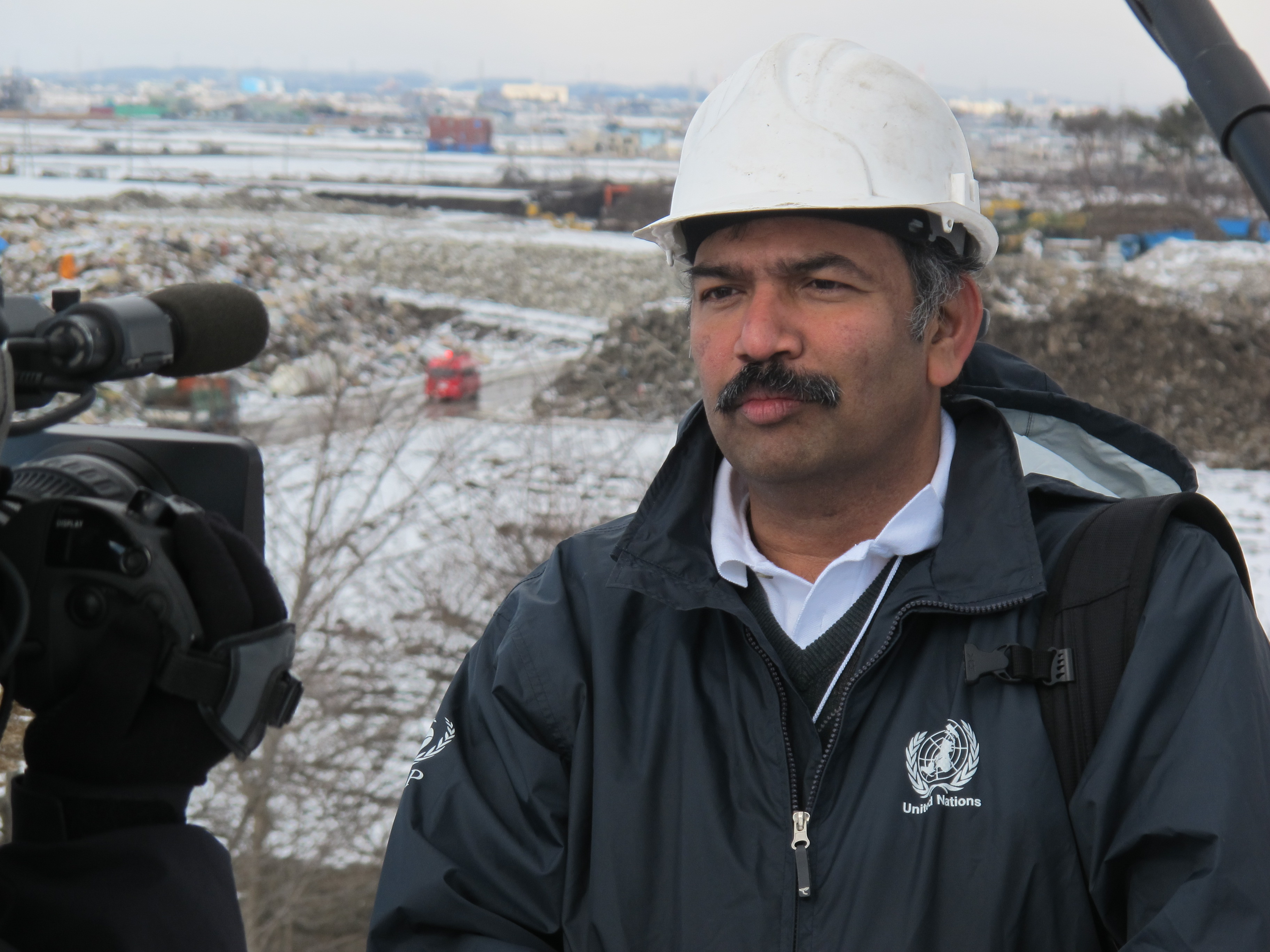

Director of the Coordination Office of G20 Global Land Initiative Coordination Office of United Nations Convention to Combat Desertification (UNCCD).
- Incumbent
- Assumed office February 2022

Personal details
- Born: 10 August 1964 (age 62) Vengola, Kochi, Ernakulam, Kerala, India
- Citizenship: Indian
- Parents: Raman Nair (father); Kamalakshi Amma (mother)
- Education: PhD in Engineering
- Alma mater: IIT Kanpur; Mar Athanasius College of Engineering
- Occupation: Disaster Management Expert
- Profession: Engineer
- Committees: Member, Emergency Preparedness & Response, IAEA Safety Standards Committee and Member, Advisory Committee, Center for Natural Resources and Development of Technical University of Cologne
- Website: muraleethummarukudy.com; kathakal.muraleethummarukudy.com

Muralee Thummarukudy (born 10 August 1964) is the Director of the Coordination Office of UN Convention to Combat Desertification (UNCCD). Prior to UNCCD Muralee was the Chief of Disaster Risk Reduction in the UN Environment Programme. An internationally renowned expert in disaster response, Muralee has been involved in post-disaster response and follow-up of almost all major disasters of the twenty-first century, including the 2004 Indian Ocean earthquake and tsunami, Cyclone Nargis (Myanmar, 2008), Sichuan Earthquake (China, 2008), Haiti Earthquake (2010), Tohoku tsunami (2011) and floods in Thailand (2011). He has completed assignments in Afghanistan, Iraq, Syria, Lebanon, the Gaza Strip, Liberia, Sudan and Rwanda dealing with the environmental impacts of conflicts. Also deployed to China, Japan, Myanmar, Ukraine, Haiti, and Thailand to deal with Disasters. He is a native of Vengola in Ernakulam district of the Kerala in India.

== Alma mater ==
Before joining the United Nations, Muralee was an Environmental Advisor to the oil companies of Shell plc in Southeast Asia and the Middle East. He responded to numerous oil spills and oil well fires during this period. He obtained his B.Tech degree from Mar Athanasius College of Engineering, Kothamangalam in Kerala in 1986. He obtained his M.Tech degree from IIT Kanpur in 1988. He received his PhD also from IIT Kanpur in 1993. He has published several books and writes articles in leading Malayalam dailies occasionally. Muralee is winner of the Kerala Sahitya Akademi Award for Humour 2018 for humorous literature.

Muralee Thummarukudy wrote a Facebook post in Malayalam on terrorism which was published in various Malayalam dailies.

== Books ==
- Veendum Chila Naattukaaryangal
- Kazchappadukal
- Surakshayude Padangal
- Perumazha Pakarnna Padangal
- Budhanum Shankaranum Pinne Njanum

== Awards and honors ==
- Kerala Sahitya Akademi Award for Humour 2018, for his memoir Chila Naattukaryangal
