= Agninakshathram (1977 film) =

- Directed by: A. Vincent
- Written by: C. L. Jose; Thoppil Bhasi (dialogues)
- Produced by: M. O. Joseph
- Starring: Lakshmi; Mohan Sharma; Adoor Bhasi; Kottayam Santha
- Cinematography: S. Navkanth
- Edited by: M. S. Mani
- Music by: G. Devarajan
- Production company: Manjilas
- Distributed by: Manjilas
- Release date: 14 April 1977
- Country: India
- Language: Malayalam

Agninakshathram is a 1977 Indian Malayalam film, directed by A. Vincent and produced by M. O. Joseph. The film stars Lakshmi, Mohan Sharma, Adoor Bhasi and Kottayam Santha in the lead roles. The film has musical score by G. Devarajan.

== Cast ==
- Lakshmi
- Mohan Sharma
- Adoor Bhasi
- Kottayam Santha
- Sam
- Sankaradi
- James
- Baby Madhavi
- Bahadoor
- Bindulatha
- George Thachil
- Janardanan
- KPAC Sunny
- M. G. Soman
- Mallika Sukumaran
- Master Thankappan
- N. Govindankutty
- Nanditha Bose
- Oduvil Unnikrishnan
- P. K. Abraham
- Paravoor Bharathan
- Paul Manjila

== Soundtrack ==
The music was composed by G. Devarajan and the lyrics were written by Sasikala Menon.

| No. | Song | Singers | Lyrics | Length (m:ss) |
|---|---|---|---|---|
| 1 | "Chentheekkanal Chinnum" | P. Leela, P. Madhuri, Latha Raju | Sasikala Menon | |
| 2 | "Kanmanippaithale" | P. Madhuri | Sasikala Menon | |
| 3 | "Navadambathimaare" | K. J. Yesudas, Chorus | Sasikala Menon | |
| 4 | "Nithyasahaaya Maathave" | P. Susheela | Sasikala Menon | |
| 5 | "Swarnameghathukilin" | K. J. Yesudas, P. Madhuri | Sasikala Menon | |
