= S. V. Venugopan Nair =

Indian Malayalam writer (1945–2022)

S. V. Venugopan Nair (18 April 1945 – 23 August 2022) was an Indian writer, who wrote in Malayalam. He has won many awards including the Kerala Sahitya Akademi Award for Drama and Kerala Sahitya Akademi Award for Story.

== Biography ==
He was born on 18 April 1945, to P. Sadasivan Thampi and J. V. Vishalakshiamma, in Neyyattinkara, in the present-day Trivandrum district of Kerala, India.

He completed his education from Kulathoor High School in Neyyattinkara and University College, Trivandrum. Nair completed Bachelor of Arts, Master of Arts, Master of Philosophy and Doctor of Philosophy degrees in Malayalam literature. He started working as a college lecturer in 1965. He worked in Scott Christian College in Nagercoil and in several colleges managed by Nair Service Society in Kerala, including the N.S.S. College, Cherthala, the VTM NSS College, Dhanuvachapuram, the NSS College, Nilamel, the NSS College, Ottapalam and the N.S.S College, Manjeri.

He was married to Valsala, and the couple had two sons and a daughter. Nair died on 23 August 2022, at the age of 77.

== List of works ==
=== Short story collections ===
- Mruthithalam (Kottayam: S.P.C.S., 1979)
- Adiseshan (Kottayam: N.B.S., 1983)
- Rekhayillatha Oraal (Chirayinkeezhu: Saritha, 1984)
- Garbhasreeman (Kottayam: S.P.C.S.)
- Rekhayillatha Oral (Chirayinkeezhu: Saritha, 1984)
- Thiktham, Theekshnam, Thimiram (Kottayam: N.B.S., 1983, collection of three novelettes)
- Bhoomiputhrante Vazhi (Kottayam: DC Books, 1987)
- Ottappalam (Kottayam: Vidyarthi Mithram, 1990)
- Madyakala Kathakal (Kottayam: S.P.C.S., 1994)
- Kathakaladisadaram (Kottayam: Current Books, 1996, 12 stories)
- Ente Paradaivangal (Kottayam: DC Books, 1997, 18 stories)
- Veedinte Nanartham (Trivandrum: Chintha, 1998)
- Kamatheertham (Trivandrum: Maluben, 2001, 23 stories written between 1967 and 2001)
- 51 Thiranjedutha Kathakal (Kottayam: S.P.C.S., 2010, 51 stories)
- S.V.yude Kathakal Sampoornam (Trivandrum: Maluben, 2018, complete collection of short stories)

=== Other ===
- Jim Prabhu (Kottayam: DC Books, 1983, Translation of Joseph Conrad's Lord Jim)
- Aa Manushyan (Kottayam: DC Books, 1984, Translation of Amrita Pritam's That Man)
- Chuvanna Akathalathinte Kinavu (Kottayam: DC Books, 1985, Translation of Cao Xueqin's Dream of the Red Chamber)
- Vātsalyarasaṃ C. V. Yude Akhyāyikakaḷil (Kottayam: Current Books, 1995, Study on C. V. Raman Pillai's works)
- Hāsyam Novel Silpathil (Trivandrum: Maluben, 1997, Study on the works of C. V. Raman Pillai, O. Chandhu Menon, Basheer and O. V. Vijayan)
- Malayāla Bhāsha Charitram (Trivandrum: Maluben, 2000, History of Malayalam language)
- Swadeshabhimani (Neyyattinkara: Swadeshabhimani Books, 2016, drama)

== Awards ==
- 2017: Kerala Sahitya Akademi Award for Drama – Swadeshabhimani
- 2003: Padmarajan Award – "Bandhanasthanaya Anirudhan" (published in Kalakaumudi, 2003)
- 2000: Abu Dhabi Sakthi Award - Veedinte Nanartham
- 1990: Kerala Sahitya Akademi Award for Story – Bhoomiputhrante Vazhi
- 1984: Edasseri Award – Rekhayillatha Oral
