= Palakkeezh Narayanan =

Indian Malayalam language writer and academic (1940–2021)

- പാലക്കീഴ് നാരായണൻ
- Born: 1940; Chemmaniyod, Malabar district, British India
- Died: 5 November 2021; Chemmaniyod, Malappuram district
- Citizenship: India
- Occupations: academic, writer
- Spouse: P. M. Savithri
- Parent(s): Palakkeezh Narayanan Namboothiri, angeli Antarjanam
- Writing career
- Notable awards: Kerala Sahitya Akademi Award for Overall Contributions

Palakkeezh Narayanan was a Malayalam language writer, academic and political activist from Kerala, India. For his outstanding contributions in the field of Malayalam literature, he received the Kerala Sahitya Akademi Award for Overall Contributions in 2019. Presenting the award, the then Chairman of Sahitya Akademi, Vaisakhan said that he was proud and happy to present the award to Palakkeezhu, who had worked for the Malayalam language, literature and culture with 100% dedication.

== Biography ==
Narayanan was born in 1940 at Chemmaniyod in present-day Malappuram district to Palakkeezh Narayanan Namboothiri and Nangeli Antarjanam. He studied at Chemmaniyod, Melattur, Mannarkkad and in Pattambi Sree Neelakanda Government Sanskrit College and has passed the Vidvan examination and M.A. graduation.

He retired in 1995 as a teacher at Perinthalmanna PTM Government College.

As a communist follower, he is best known for spearheading the socio-cultural movements in Valluvanad region, initiated by E. M. S. Namboodiripad and writer and politician Cherukad Govinda Pisharody. A great disciple of Cherukad, it was only with his determination that the Perinthalmanna Cherukad Memorial Trust, which promotes young writers in the state, came into exist.

He has served as District President and State committee member of Purogamana Kala Sahitya Sangham, A.K.G.T.C founding leader, Kerala Sahithta Samithi secretary, State Executive Member of the Kerala state Library Council and Chief Editor of the Granthalokam magazine published by State Library Council from 2005 to 2010. The editorials he wrote in the Granthalokam were later published as a book titled Mukhamozhikal.

=== Personal life and death ===
He died on 2021 November 05 at his house in Chemmaniyode. Paying homage to Palakkeezh Narayanan, Vaishakan, writer and chairman of the Kerala Sahitya Akademi said that, instead of focusing on his own active writing, Palakkeezh used his literary qualities mainly to encourage others to write. He is survived by his wife P. M. Savithri.

== Notable works ==
- VT Oru Ithihasam
- Anandamadam
- Karl Marx
- Muthassiyude Aranoottandu
- Cherukad - Ormayum Kazhchayum
- Cherukad - Prathibhayum Samoohavum
- Mahabharatha Kathal
- Mukhamozhikal. Chintha publications. 2013.

== Awards and honors ==
- Kerala Sahitya Akademi Award for Overall Contribution, 2019
- Kerala State Library Council's P N Panicker Award
- IV Das Award
- Academi Award for Best Library Worker
