= Jose Punnamparambil =

Indian writer and translator

- Born: 10 May 1936 (age 90); Irinjalakkuda, Thrissur district, Kerala
- Occupations: journalist, translator
- Spouse: Sosamma
- Children: 2
- Writing career
- Genre: Translation
- Notable awards: Kerala Sahitya Akademi Award for Overall Contributions

Jose Punnamparambil (born 10 May 1936) is a senior European journalist and translator from Kerala, India. He has been translating Malayalam works into German for 52 years. In 2018, he received Kerala Sahitya Akademi Award for overall contributions to the Malayalam literature.

== Biography ==
Jose Punnamparambil was born in 1936 May 10, at Edukkalam near Irinjalakkuda in Thrissur district. He immigrated to Germany with a media study scholarship in 1966, after graduating with a degree in English Literature from the University of Mumbai.

While training in social work and journalism, he worked as a government official and college teacher in Mumbai. He worked for five years in Germany as a freelance journalist and has been a member of the advisory board of the Indo-German Society for the past 16 years.

While in Germany, Jose published a Malayalam periodical named Nadan Kath literally meaning local letter. The publication Ente Lokam (Meaning: my world) which he started in 1973 is still being published in Germany as Nammude Lokam (Meaning: our world). He also published German translation of Ente lokam named Mein Welt in 1984.

His contributions include 20 books and documentaries in German and Malayalam. In 2014, Jose made a documentary titled Translated Lives, which chronicles the life of Malayalee nurses who immigrated to Germany from 1960 onwards. This documentary was well received. His documentary Ariyapedatha Jeevithangal (The Unknown Lives) is based on migration of Catholic nuns from Kerala to Germany in the 1970s.

Jose was instrumental in establishing a Malayalam Literary Chair named after Herman Gundert at the University of Tübingen. He studied Malayalam literature for the Nobel Prize Committee and formed the Literature Forum India in Germany.

== Family ==
He and his wife Sosamma have two children. They live in Unkel in Germany.

== Notable works ==
- Christina Kamp & Jose Punnamparambil (2005). Malayalam für Kerala Buch (in German) (1. Aufl ed.). Bielefeld. ISBN 978-3-89416-357-0. OCLC 76721558.
- Meine Welt - deine Welt, eine Welt für alle Erfahrungen, Einsichten und Meinungen eines indischen Migranten (in German). Jose Punnamparambil. Heidelberg. 2014. ISBN 978-3-937603-87-2. OCLC 878165835.
- InderKinder über das Aufwachsen und Leben in Deutschland (in German). Urmila Goel, Jose Punnamparambil, Nisa Punnamparambil-Wolf. Heidelberg. 2012. ISBN 978-3-937603-73-5. OCLC 826577517.
- Punnamparambil, Jose (2010). Nachtregen Gegenwartslyrik aus Indien (in German). Heidelberg. ISBN 9783937603414.
- Zacharia, Paul; Sakkaṟiya (2004). Bhaskara Pattelar und andere Geschichten (in German) (Dt. Orig.-Ausg ed.). Bad Honnef. ISBN 9783895021794.
- Goel, Urmila; Punnamparambil, Jose; Punnamparambil-Wolf, Nisa (2012). InderKinder über das Aufwachsen und Leben in Deutschland (in German). Heidelberg. ISBN 9783937603735.
- Kamp, Christina (2006). Drei Blinde beschreiben den Elefanten [Kerala erzählt] (in German). Bad Honnef. ISBN 9783895022234.
- Punnamparambil, Jose (2016). Erwartungen - Frauenstimmen aus Indien Erzählungen, Reden und Essays (in German) ([1. Auflage] ed.). Heidelberg. ISBN 9783945191170.
- Punnamparambil, Jose (1990). Umarme den Baum ... indische Ansichten zu Ökologie und Fortschritt (in German). Unkel/Rhein. ISBN 9783927905030.
- Malayalam (Kerala); Aussprache-Trainer (in German). Bielefeld. 2005. ISBN 9783831761067.
- Samrudhiyil Ottakku (in Malayalam). Olive publications. 2014. ISBN 978-9383756735.
- Punnāmpar̲Ampil, Jōs; Māṇikkattȧ, Jōy (2014). Malayalikalude German Pravasam (in Malayalam). Kēraḷa Caritr̲a Gavēṣaṇa Kaunsil. ISBN 978-81-85499-47-5. OCLC 900194154.

== Awards and honors ==
- Kerala Sahitya Akademi Award for Overall Contributions
- GMF (Global Malayali Federation) Literary Award 2016
- Cross of the Order of Merit of the Federal Republic of Germany 2022
