= K. G. Paulose =

Indian Sanskrit scholar

- Born: 9 July 1946; Kokkapilli Thripunithura, Kerala
- Education: MA, Ph.D
- Known for: Contributions to sanskrit studies, aesthetics, dramatorgy, natyashastra, kutiyaatam
- Partner: Prof. T. K. Sarala
- Children: Manu, Smrti

K. G. Paulose is a Sanskrit scholar specialized in the dramaturgy of the Natya Shastra and Kooditaatam.

== Early life ==
He is born in a Christian family in Puthan Kavu, Ernakulam district in the Indian state of Kerala. He studied in the Sanskrit pathasala and Sanskrit college under the guidance of scholars such as T. K. Ramachandra Iyer and Damodarapisharoty.

== Career ==
His teaching career began in 1969 at Neelakanthasarma Sanskrit college Pattambi. he became principal in govt. Sanskrit college, Tripunithura in 1986. In 1987 he became the syndicate member of MG University. In 1996 he became the first registrar of Sree Sankara University of Sanskrit. In 2007 he became the first vice chancellor of Kerala Kerala Kalamandalam after it was deemed a university. He became editor in charge of the publication division of Arya Vaidya Sala, Kottakkal.

== Personal life ==
He is married to T. K. Sarala. Together, they have a son, Manu K.P., and a daughter, Smrti K.P. Manu K.P. married Annie Mathai and they have two daughters, Navaneeta Manu and Nandita Manu. Smrti K.P. married Sanjeev and they have a daughter, Nisa Sayana.

== Contributions ==
=== Books ===
- Natamkusha- a critic of dramaturgy
- Kootiyattam a historic study
- Introduction to Kootiyattam
- Bhagavadajjuka in Kootiyattam
- Bheema in search of celestial flower- kalyanasaugandhika
- Kootiyattam-(Malayalam translation)

=== Edited books and journals ===
- Dheemahai- bilingual journal, Chinmaya international foundation
- Aryavaidyan-
- Poornatrayi- journal of Sanskrit college, Tripunithura
- Ravivarma Sanskrit Grandhavali, the publication division of govt. Sanskrit college tTipunithura
- Subodhini- HH Rajarshi Ravivarma
- Narayaneeyam- with commentary of Sahityatilakan Ramapisharoti.
- Balabodhanam
- Vakyatatvam
- Scientific heritage of India- Ayurveda
- Scientific heritage of India- mathematics

== Honours ==
- 'Vyangyavyakhya: The Aesthetics of Dhvani in Theatre 'for its prestigious award for the best book on art on 09-11-2014 - Keralakalamandalam Deemed University for Art and Culture
- Eminent Sanskrit Scholar, on 12-11-2014-The Centre for Heritage Studies, Govt. of Kerala, Hill Palace Tripunithura
- Vachaspati on 22-11-2014 - Anyonyam at Kadavalloor awarded the title of
- Vachaspati in 2009 - Thirupati Sanskrit Viswavidyalaya
