= Jose Panachippuram =

Indian writer and journalist

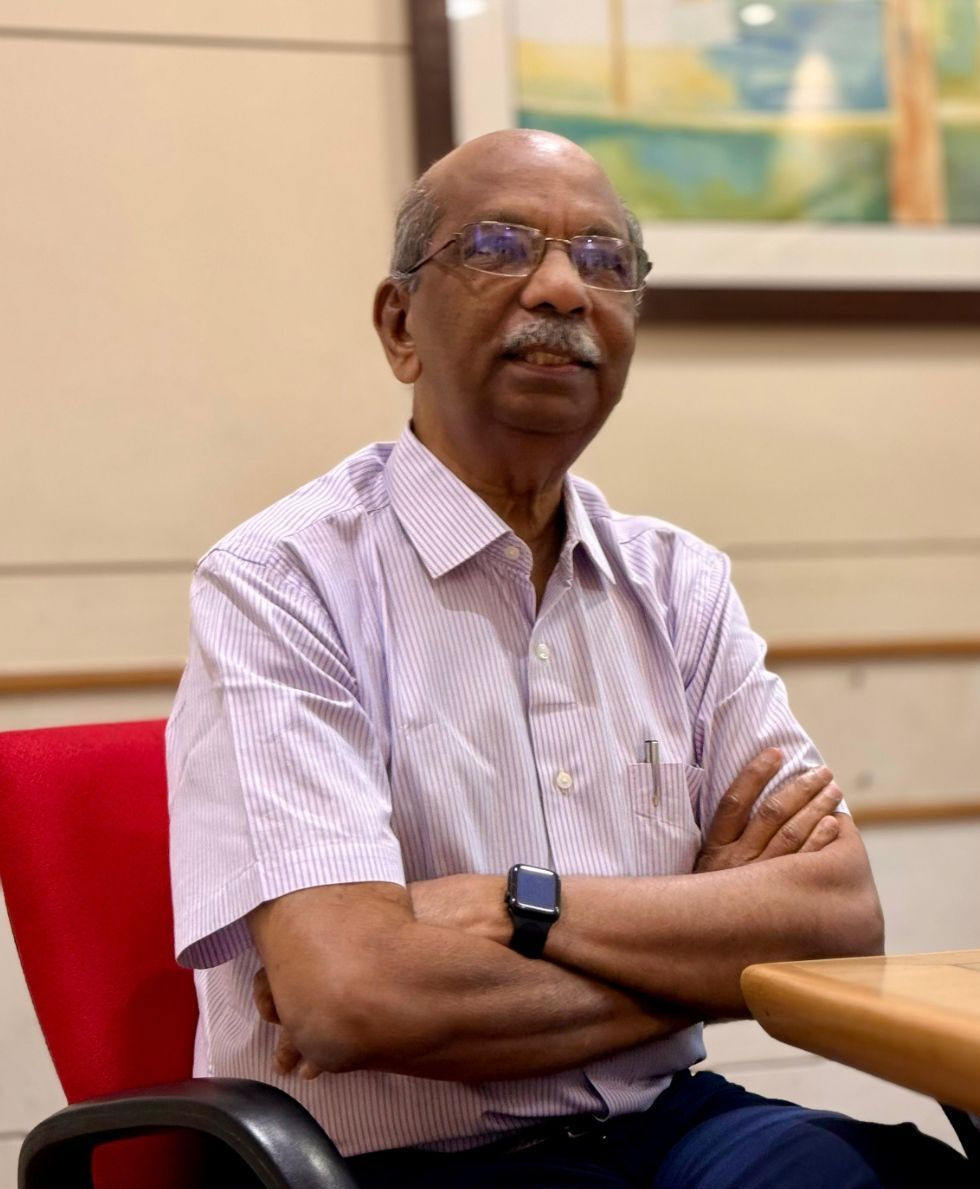
- Jose Panachippuram
- Born: August 24, 1951 (age 75); Vazhoor, Kottayam district, Kerala, India
- Education: Master's degree in English Literature
- Occupations: Journalist, writer, columnist
- Writing career
- Language: Malayalam, English
- Notable works: Kannadiyile Mazha, Irakkam, Methan Mani, Kumarakom Thottulla Kathakal
- Notable awards: Kerala Sahitya Akademi Award (2003, 2005), National Award for Newspaper Design (1980)

Jose Panachippuram (born 24 August 1951) is an Indian journalist, novelist, short story writer and columnist who writes primarily in Malayalam. He served as the editorial director of Malayala Manorama and the editor in charge of the literary monthly Bhashaposhini.

He is best known for his novels, short stories and long-running newspaper columns. His satirical column Tharangangalil appeared every Wednesday in Malayala Manorama for about 47 years and is regarded as one of the longest-running columns in Malayalam journalism. He has also written the literary humour column Snehapoorvam Panachi in Bhashaposhini for over three decades (33 years) and authored the captions for the newspaper's popular Kunjukkuruppu pocket cartoon for more than 36 years. He retired from Malayala Manorama on June 30,2026.

== Early life and career ==
He was born in Vazhoor in Kottayam district, Kerala, on 24 August 1951. He obtained a postgraduate degree in English Literature and began his professional career as an auditor in the Office of the Accountant General in Thiruvananthapuram before entering journalism.

During his career with Malayala Manorama, he served in several editorial roles and later became Editorial Director. He was also the editor in charge of Bhashaposhini, one of Kerala's leading literary magazines.

== Literary career ==
He has authored more than thirty books, including novels, short story collections, novellas and collections of columns. His work spans fiction, satire and literary journalism. He has also published poetry in English.

His professional book on newspaper design, Pathrakalpana, has been used as a textbook in media studies.

=== Novels ===
- Swantham
- Ardram
- Kattadiyude Geetham
- Alikhitham
- Manpedakkunnile Seetha
- Kannadiyile Mazha
- Ajnathante Suvishesham
- E-Roudram
- Delannoyude Vaal
- Kadamattam Chitta
- Methan Mani
- Irakkam

=== Short story collections ===
- Ashadham
- Ezhuthappettirikkunnathupole
- Dharavi
- Irupathaaramathe Kathi
- 7, Jahangir Road
- Chengannoorinum Thiruvallaykkumidayil Evideyo
- Chembakakkutty Randamal
- Archimedes Durantham
- Amazon Chuttika
- Monsoon Bathroom
- Pulikkum Vedikkum Thammil
- Kumarakom Thottulla Kathakal

=== Novellas ===
- Kathayil Illatha Oraal
- Uthama Purushanum Sthreepakshavum

=== Collections of columns ===
- Tharangangalil Panachi
- Snehapoorvam Panachi
- Vada Koduthum Vadi Koduthum
- Ezhuthum Kuthukalum
- Shoonyavela
- Tharangangalil 2.0

== Awards and honours ==
He is among the few Malayalam writers to have received the Kerala Sahitya Akademi Award twice.

His honours include:

- Samastha Kerala Sahithya Parishath Award for Best Short Story (1971)
- National Award for Best Newspaper Design (1980)
- Koduppunna Award for Best Columnist (1999)
- JKV Award for Dharavi (2000)
- Kerala Kalakendram Award for Best Columnist (2001)
- American Malayalam Vedhi Award for Literary Journalism (2001)
- Kerala Sahitya Akademi Award for Humour Literature for Snehapoorvam Panachi (2003)
- Kerala Catholic Bishops' Council Media Award (2004)
- Kerala Sahitya Akademi Award for the novel Kannadiyile Mazha (2005)
- C. H. Mohammed Koya Award for Lifetime Contribution to Journalism (2006)
- V.K.B. Award for Best Columnist (2007)
- Kerala Media Academy Award for Best Headline (2008)
- P. Kesavadev Award for Overall Contribution (2008)
- Mary Benigna Literary Award (2015)
- Pandalam Kerala Varma Media Award (2016)

== Professional associations ==
He has served as a member of the governing bodies of the Kerala Sahitya Akademi and the Kerala Media Academy. He served as president of both the Ernakulam Press Club and the Kottayam Press Club.
