= Baiju N. Nair =

Indian television host

Baiju
- Born: Kottayam, Kerala, India
- Occupations: Automotive journalist; Writer; Television presenter; YouTuber
- Television: Asianet News
- Awards: Kerala Sahitya Akademi Award

YouTube information
- Channel: Baiju N Nair
- Years active: 2014–present
- Subscribers: 1.12 million
- Views: 250.7 million
- Last updated: 29 March 2025

Baiju N Nair is an Indian television host, YouTuber, author, travel and automobile journalist and chief editor of Smart Drive automobile magazine. He won a Kerala Sahitya Akademi Award in 2018. He is the host of the TV show Smart Drive in Asianet News.

== Award ==
| Year | Award | Category | Result | Ref. |
|---|---|---|---|---|
| 2018 | Kerala Sahitya Akademi Award | Travelogue | Won | |

== Books ==
- Londanilekk Oru Road Yathra
- Silk Route
- Car Paricharanam
- Car Vangumbol
- Nalu Kadalrajyangal

== See also ==
- Kerala Sahitya Akademi Award for Travelogue
- Kerala Sahitya Akademi Award
