= Cheruthuruthi =

Cheruthuruthy
- Town
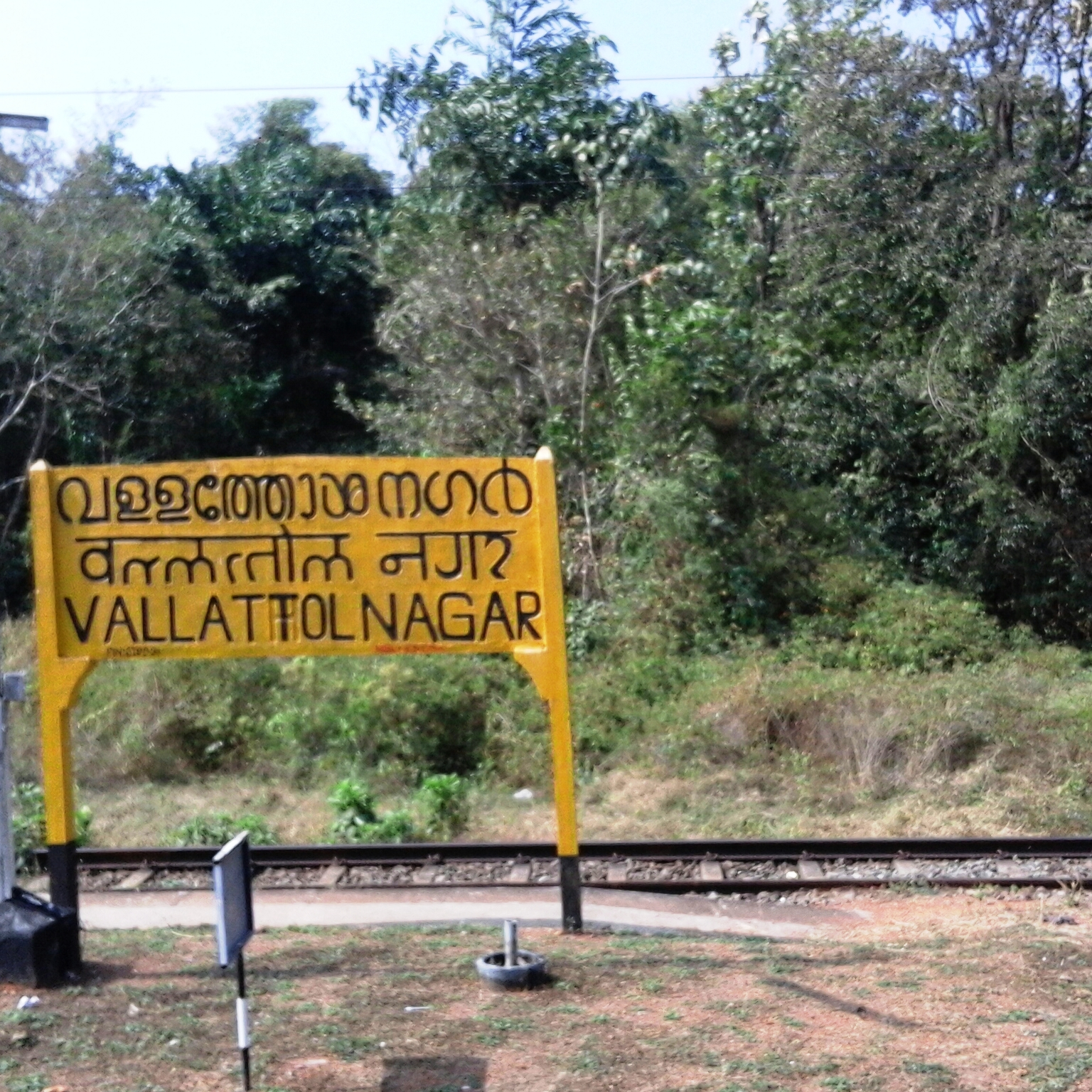
- Vallathol Nagar
- Interactive map of Cheruthuruthy
- Coordinates: 10.7426200°N 76.271680°E
- Country: India
- State: Kerala
- District: Thrissur

Languages
  - Official: Malayalam, English
- Time zone: UTC+5:30 (IST)
- Postal code: 679531
- Vehicle registration: KL-48
- Nearest city: Thrissur

Cheruthuruthy, also known as Vallathol Nagar, is a small town in India near Wadakkanchery in Thrissur district on the banks of the Nila (Bharathapuzha) River.
