= Varanasi Vishnu Namboothiri =

Indian Maddalam exponent (1937–2020)

- Born: 20 January 1937; Mavelikkara, British India
- Died: 28 January 2020 (aged 83); Thiruvalla, Pathanamthitta district, India
- Citizenship: India
- Education: Kerala Kalamandalam
- Occupation: instrumentalist
- Spouse: Saraswati Antharjanam
- Children: 2
- Parent(s): Narayanan Namboodiri, Draupati Antharjanam
- Awards: Sangeet Natak Akademi Award, Kerala Kalamandalam Vadya Award, Kerala Sangeetha Nataka Akademi Gurupooja award
- Musical career
- Genre: Kathakali music
- Instrument: Maddalam
- Years active: 1952-2002

Varanasi Vishnu Namboothiri is a Maddalam exponent from Kerala, India, best known for playing Maddalam for Kathakali performances. He received several noted awards including Sangeet Natak Akademi Award, Kerala Sangeetha Nataka Akademi Gurupooja Award and Kerala Kalamandalam Award.

== Biography ==
Vishnu Namboothiri was born on 20 January 1937, in Mavelikkara in present-day Alappuzha district to Varanasi Illam Narayanan Namboothiri and Draupadi Antarjan. He is the brother of famous Kathakali chenda artist Varanasi Madhavan Namboothiri. They were known as the Varanasi Brothers.

He started practicing Maddalam during his high school years. Karuvatta Kumarapanikkar and Vennimala Ramavaryar introduced Vishnu Namboothiri to play Maddalam. He received his expert Maddalam training from Kerala Kalamandalam under Kalamandalam Appukutty Pothuval and Kalamandalam Nambisankutty and from Unnai Warrier Memorial Kalanilayam under Chalakudy Narayanan Nambisan.

Vishnu Namboothiri is well known for playing Maddalam for Kathakali and has performed with renowned Kathakali artists such as Kalamandalam Krishnan Nair, Chengannur Raman Pillai, Mankulam Vishnu Namboothiri, Kudamalur Karunakaran Nair, Guru Gopinath, Champakulam Pachu Pillai and Kurichi Kunjan Panicker. He made his debut in 1952 at the Mavelikkara Mannur Math Palace Shiva Temple. He stopped his performances in 2002 with the death of his brother. But later, in 2012, at the time of Lavanasura Vadham Kathakali in Mavelikkara Kandiyoor temple, he again played Maddalam at the insistence of the audience.

He is a former board member of Kerala Kalamandalam and Kerala Sangeetha Nataka Akademi. He was Mel Santhi (head priest) of Mavelikkara Mannur Math Palace Lord Shiva temple.

=== Personal life and death ===
He and his wife Payyannur Koroth Velliyott Illam Saraswati Antharjanam have two children. He died at a private hospital in Thiruvalla on 2020 January 28. The funeral was held in the courtyard of his house with official honors from Kerala government.

== Awards and honors ==
- Sangeet Natak Akademi Award (2015)
- Kerala Sangeetha Nataka Akademi Gurupooja Award (2007)
- Kerala Kalamandalam Vadya Award (2009)
- Kalamandalam Hyderali Memorial Award
- Travancore Devaswom Board's Kalaratnam
- Kanchi Kamakoti Peetham has been awarded him the title Asthana Vidwan (Head Scholar)
- Chennithala Chellappan Pillai Memorial Award
- Kalamandalam Padmashree Krishnan Nair Memorial Award
- Kalamandalam Appukutty Pothuval Memorial Award
- Kalamandalam Krishnankutty Pothuval Memorial Kalasagar Award
- Kannur Neelakanthar Memorial Kathakali Award
