= Mavelikkara (disambiguation) =

Mavelikkara is a town in Alappuzha district, Kerala, India.

Mavelikkara may also refer to:

- Mavelikara (Lok Sabha constituency), a constituency in Kerala

== People ==
- Mavelikkara Krishnankutty Nair (1920–1988), Carnatic Mridangam player
- Mavelikkara Velukkutty Nair, Indian mridangam player
- Mavelikkara S. R. Raju, Carnatic music percussionist
- Mavelikkara Prabhakara Varma (1928–2008), Indian carnatic singer
