= Panjal Unnikrishnan =

Indian Chenda exponent (born 1944)

- Born: Unnikrishnan; March 18, 1944 (age 81); Panjal, Kingdom of Cochin (present-day Thrissur district of Kerala, India)
- Occupations: Chenda exponent and teacher
- Awards: Kerala Sangeetha Nataka Akademi Fellowship (2022); Kerala Kalamandalam Award (2014); Pravasi Kalasree award by Kerala Sangeetha Nataka Akademi (2013)

Panjal Unnikrishnan also known as Kalamandalam Panjal Unnikrishnan and Kalamandalam Unnikrishnan is an Indian percussionist from Kerala. He is primarily a Chenda player and also plays the Edakka. He received several awards and honors including the senior fellowship by the Ministry of Culture, Government of India, the Pravasi Kalasree award 2013 by the Kerala Sangeetha Nataka Akademi and the 2014 Kerala Kalamandalam Award for Chenda. In 2022, he received the Kerala Sangeetha Nataka Akademi Fellowship, the highest award of Kerala Sangeetha Nataka Akademi, Government of Kerala.

== Biography ==
Unnikrishnan was born on March 18, 1944, at Panjal in present-day Thrissur district of Kerala. He started learning Chenda from Thamattoor Shankaran Nair and later received training from Kalamandalam Achunni Poduval. He studied 5-year diploma at Kerala Kalamandalam during 1957–62.

== Career ==
Immediately after completing the Kalamandalam course, Krishnankutty Poduval included Unnikrishnan in his Vellinezhi Sahrudaya Sangam, which he had started with the aim of encouraging young people in the field of Kathakali. After that, he worked at the Unnai Warrier Memorial Art Center in Irinjalakuda and the Muthappan Kathakali Yogam in Parassinikkadav in Kannur district.

In 1967 he joined the International Centre for Kathakali (ICK) in Delhi as a teacher and later became its principal, and retired from there in 2010.

Apart from Kathakali, Unnikrishnan plays the Chenda as background music for Indian performing arts like Mohiniyattam, Bharatanatyam, Kuchipudi, Kathak and also fusion dances. He also plays Edakka for Panchavadyam. He has also collaborated with North Indian and forign percussionists, such as tabla and taiko players. He has performed at many venues in India and abroad. In addition, Unnikrishnan also leads lectures and performances to spread the reach of Kerala art to other parts of the country.

== Awards and honors ==
In 2006, Unnikrishnan received the senior fellowship by the Ministry of Culture, Government of India. In 2013, He received the Pravasi Kalasree award by the Kerala Sangeetha Nataka Akademi. In 2014, he received the Kerala Kalamandalam Award for Chenda. In 2022, he received the Kerala Sangeetha Nataka Akademi Fellowship, the highest award of Kerala Sangeetha Nataka Akademi, Government of Kerala.
