= V. T. Aravindaksha Menon =

Indian actor (1921–1994)

- Born: 22 July 1921; Kodungallur, British Raj
- Died: 3 May 1994 (aged 72)
- Occupation: Actor
- Known for: Introducing realistic acting in the professional theatre of Kerala
- Spouse: L. Sarasamma
- Children: 2
- Parents: Kochurama Warrier (father); Parukutty Amma (mother)
- Awards: National Drama Award (1965); Sangeet Natak Akademi Award (1965); Kerala Sangeetha Nataka Akademi Fellowship (1993)

V. T. Aravindaksha Menon was an Indian actor from Kerala. Apart from performing lead roles in several plays, he has acted in 17 Malayalam films and sung two Malayalam film songs. He received the National Drama Award for acing in 1965, the Sangeet Natak Akademi Award for theatre from Sangeet Natak Akademi, Government of India, in 1965 and the Kerala Sangeetha Nataka Akademi Fellowship for drama from Kerala Sangeetha Nataka Akademi, Government of Kerala, in 1993.

== Biography ==
Aravindaksha Menon was born on 22 July 1921, to Kochurama Warrier and Parukutty Amma at the Thaiparambu house in Vadassery, Kodungallur in present-day Thrissur district of Kerala. He belongs to the lineage of the Kodungallur (Cranganore) royal family, from which many people in the field of art and literature were born. He participated in many musical and drama competitions during his school days and won. After completing his high school education, he studied classical music and conducted concerts.

Menon died on 3 May 1994.

=== Personal life ===
Menon was married to L. Sarasamma, and they have two sons Jayasankar and Krishna Kumar.

== Career ==
=== Theatre ===
Aravindaksha Menon was associated with the professional theatre stage from 1951. He first acted in the play Banker written by Kedamangalam Pappukutty in 1951.

Aravindaksha Menon joined Kalanilayam, one of the famous theatre companies in Kerala at that time, in 1951. His lead roles in the plays produced under Kalanilayam were the role of Kadamattathu Kathanar in the play Kadamattathu Kathanar, and the lead roles in the plays Ilayidathu Rani and Devadasi. He also played the character Duryodhana in the play Kurukshetram based on Kurukshetra War, and the title character of Pazhassi Raja in the play Pazhassiraja by Kozhikode Raja Theatres. These performances of his marked the beginning of realistic acting in the professional theatre of Kerala.

In 1964, Kalanilayam introduced the story of the thief Kayamkulam Kochunni from Aithihyamala in a play with the same name and with the caption "Kerala's First Socialist Revolutionary". In it, the title character Kochunni was played by Aravindaksha Menon. He received the National Drama Award for Best Actor in 1965 for this role.

In his career, Menon performed in various parts of India as a member of professional theatre groups including 'Ochira Parabrahmodayam Sangeetha Natana Sabha', 'Kalanilayam' and 'Kozhikode Raja Theatres'.

=== Cinema ===
The 1950 film Stree directed by R. Velappan Nair, the 1967 film Indulekha directed by Kalanilayam Krishnan Nair, the 1970 film Sabarimala Sree Dharmashastha directed by M. Krishnan Nair, the 1973 films Raging directed by N. N. Pisharody, and Veendum Prabhatham directed by P. Bhaskaran, the 1981 films Sreeman Sreemathi, Poocha Sanyasi and Valarthumrigangal directed by T. Hariharan, Chatta directed by Bharathan, and Kattukallan directed by P. Chandrakumar, the 1982 films Varikuzhi directed by M. T. Vasudevan Nair, Oru Mottu Virinjapol directed by G. P. Balan, Balloon directed by Ravi Guptan, the 1983 films Thavalam directed by Thampi Kannanthanam, and Varanmare Avashyamund directed by T. Hariharan, the 1986 film Kochuthemmadi directed by A. Vincent, and the 1991 Sibi Malayil film Santhwanam are the Malayalam films in which Aravindaksha Menon acted.

=== Singing ===
The film songs sung by Aravindaksha Menon are the two songs from the 1970 film Sabarimala Sree Dharmashastha, starting with "Ellam Ellam", written by P. Bhaskaran and composed by V. Dakshinamoorthy, and starting with "Tripura Sundari Natanam", written by Sreekumaran Thampi and composed by V. Dakshinamoorthy.

== Awards and honors ==
For the title character he played in the play Kayamkulam Kochunni, Aravindaksha Menon received the National Drama Award for Best Actor in 1965. In the same year he received Sangeet Natak Akademi Award for theatre from Sangeet Natak Akademi, Government of India. He received the Kerala Sangeetha Nataka Akademi Fellowship for drama in 1993.
