= Chenganoor Raman Pillai =

Kathakali artist from Kerala

Guru Chenganoor Raman Pillai
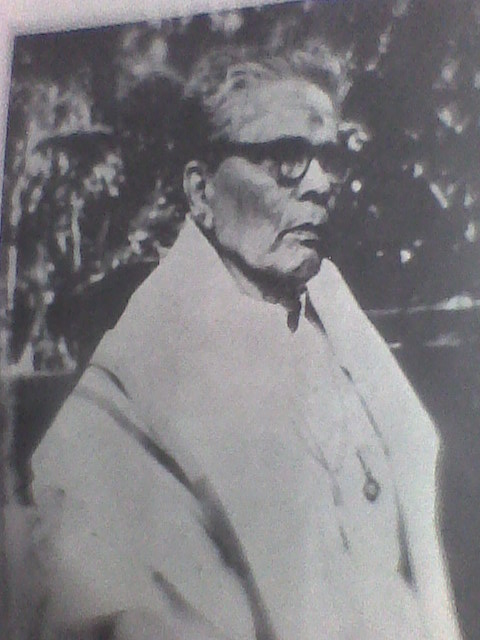
- Guru Chenganoor Raman Pillai, Kathakali artist.

Head of palace kathakali yogam to the Travancore Maharaja for 65 years.

Personal details
- Born: Raman Pillai; 16 January 1886 pandanad, Chengannur, Kingdom of Travancore, British India (now in Kerala, India)
- Died: 11 November 1980 (aged 94) pandanad, Chengannur, Kerala, India
- Profession: Kathakali artist, Kathakali teacher

Guru Chenganoor Raman Pillai, also spelt Chengannur Raman Pillai (1886–1980), was a celebrated Kathakali artist from Kerala in south India. He was known for his brilliant portrayal of the anti-heroic Kathi roles on stage, and was the head of palace kathakali yogam to the Travancore Maharaja in a career spanning almost 65 years.

Raman Pillai, born in Chenganoor on 16 January 1886, was a specialist in the Kathakali southern style called Kapplingad, which gives prominence to abhinaya (acting). He wrote Thekkan Chittayilulla Abhyasa Kramangal, considered one of the major training manuals on southern-style Kathakali.

He was a disciple of Thakazhi Kesava Panikker, Mathur Kunhupilla Panikker and Ambalappuzha Kunhikrishna Panikker. Another Kathakali master, Chennthala Kochupillai Panikker, helped him to gain popularity in his art.

Raman Pillai had his masterpieces in roles like Duryodhanan, Ravanan and Keechakan, Jarasandhan, Banan and Kamsan. He also performed as Hanuman, Hamsam and the black-bearded Kaatalan (woodsman).

Raman Pillai's leading disciples include Madavoor Vasudevan Nair, Haripad Ramakrishna Pillai, Mankompu Sivasankara Pillai, Guru Gopinath, and Chennithala Chellappan Pillai. They all studied under him as per the Gurukula system.

The documentary film Chenganoor Raman Pillai profiles his life and contributions. He died on 11 November 1980.

== Awards and honours ==
- 1962 – Kerala Sangeetha Nataka Akademi Award
- 1963 – Sangeet Natak Akademi Award
- 1971 – Padma Shri
- 1975 – Kerala Sangeetha Nataka Akademi Fellowship

== Books ==
Thekkan Chittayilulla Abhyasa Kramangal published in 1973.
