= Tripunithura N. Radhakrishnan =

Indian percussionist

- Born: Poonithura, Ernakulam district, Kerala,
- Occupation(s): Percussionist, Ghatam exponent
- Spouse: Lalithambika
- Children: 2
- Parent(s): G. Narayanaswamy; Alamelu Ammal
- Awards: Kerala Sangeetha Nataka Akademi Award and Fellowship
- Musical career
- Genres: Carnatic music
- Instrument: Ghatam
- Years active: 1967 – present

Tripunithura N. Radhakrishnan is a Ghatam exponent from Kerala, India. He is the first artist to receive the noted Kerala Sangeetha Nataka Akademi Fellowship for Ghatam. He has played the Ghatam in tens of thousands of venues across hundreds of countries.

== Biography ==
N. Radhakrishnan is the youngest of four children of Alamelu Ammal and Poonithura Valiya Parambu Meethil house G. Narayanaswamy, a renowned musician fondly called as Achasamy by the people in music field in the region. It was his father who taught him the first lessons in mridangam. Thrippunithura Mahadevan, the son of his father's sister, was a Ghatam scholar. Many of the relatives were also percussion instrument artists. He started practicing the Ghatam from a young age, and made his debut at the age of ten. Later he got expert training from Parassala Ravi and his cousin Padmabhushan T. V. Gopalakrishnan.

He passed Gana Bhushan from RLV College of Music and Fine Arts, Thripunithura in 1982. Then he passed Gana Praveena from Swathi Thirunal College of Music in Thiruvananthapuram and later a master's degree in Mridangam from Mahatma Gandhi University. He later became a teacher in the college where he studied.

Radhakrishnan has been running the GN Swamy Memorial Music School near the Poornathrayesa Temple in Thripunithura for 21 years. During his fifty years as a Ghatam teacher, he was able to impart lessons to many. Many of these are now professional artists. He also leads a fusion band named Ghatalayatarangam, which includes Ghatam, Chenda and Tabla.

=== Personal life ===
He and his wife Lalithambika have 2 children, singer Renjith and a daughter. He now resides at Vikram Sarabhai Road, Poonithura.

== Musical career ==
Radhakrishnan was one of those who sought to give due recognition to the Ghatam which was known only as a supporting instrument in Indian classical music. His first stage performance was on 16 January 1967. He has played the Ghatam in tens of thousands of venues across hundreds of countries.

Radhakrishnan has played the Ghatam in concerts by famous musicians like Chembai Vaidyanatha Bhagavatar, M. D. Ramanathan, Maharajapuram Santhanam, Madurai Somasundaram, Dr. M. L. Vasanthakumari, K. V. Narayanaswamy and Dr. M. Balamuralikrishna. In instrumental music, he has performed with noted artists like Lalgudi Jayaraman, T. N. Krishnan, Kadri Gopalnath, U. Srinivas, L. Subramaniam, N. Ravikiran and Shashank.

Radhakrishnan started playing Ghatam for Yesudas' concert on 31 March 1976, and has been performing at Yesudas' concerts for the last forty one years. He was also involved in the background music of Malayalam films such as Pooram, Rakkuyilin Ragasadassil, Sriragam, Padamudra and Devaasuram.

== Awards and honours ==
- Kerala Sangeetha Nataka Akademi Fellowship 2020
- Kerala Sangeetha Nataka Akademi Award 1997
- Vasai Fine Arts Society's Lifetime Achievement Award 2019
- Parakkadathu Koyickal Trust's Tripunithura Asthana Vidwan Puraskaram
