= C. S. Radhadevi =

Indian playback singer (1931–2025)

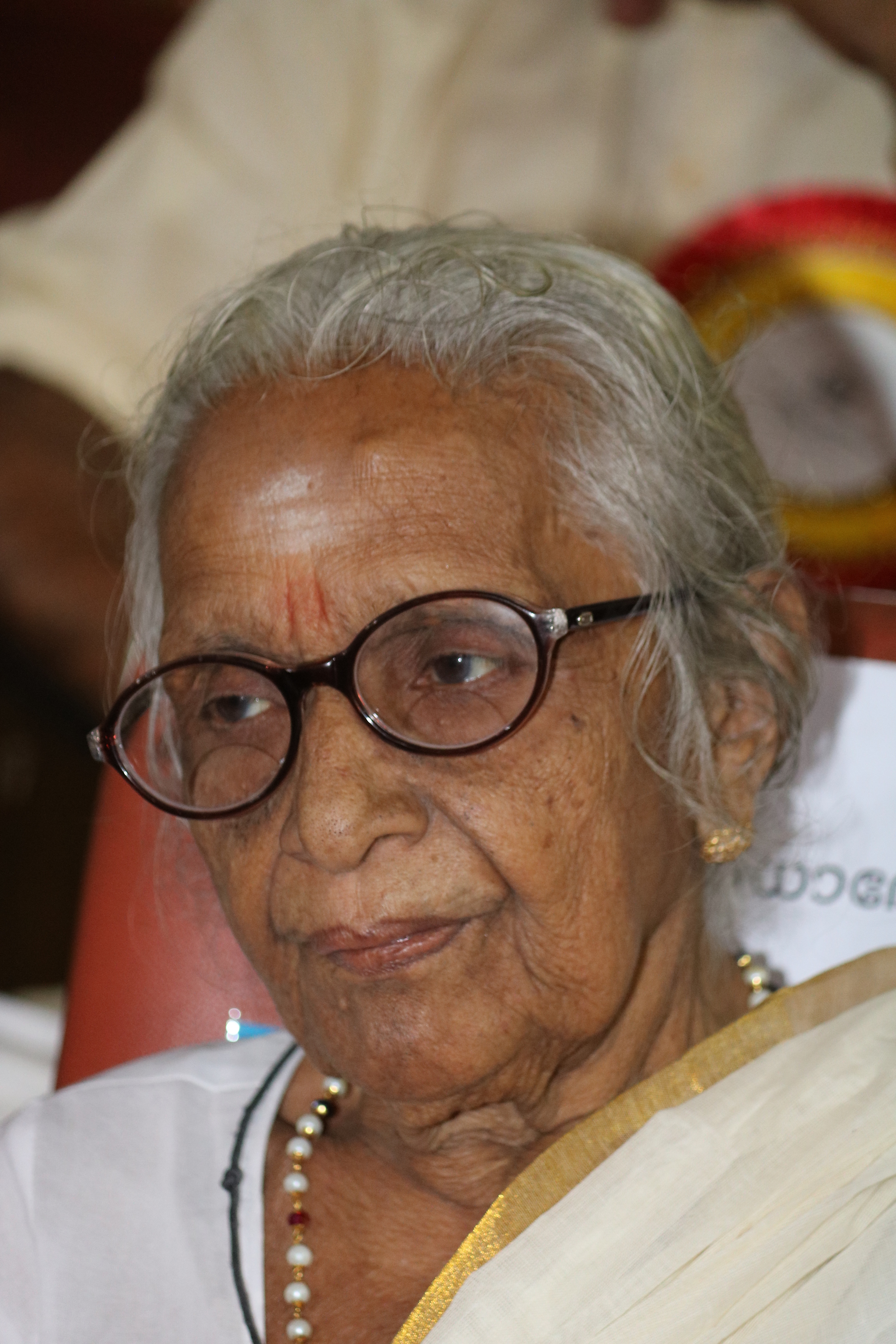
- C. S. Radhadevi
- Born: 1931; Travancore, British India
- Died: July 7, 2025 (aged 93–94); Thiruvananthapuram, Kerala
- Occupations: Solo singer, dubbing artist, radio artist
- Spouse: N. Narayanan Nair
- Honours: Kerala Sangeetha Nataka Akademi Fellowship; Kerala Sangeetha Nataka Akademi Award; Gurupooja Award by Kerala Sangeetha Nataka Akademi; Kerala Film Critics Award; Kerala State Film Award for Outstanding Contribution to Malayalam Cinema
- Musical career
- Genres: Playback singing; Filmi
- Instrument: Vocals

C. S. Radhadevi (1931 – 7 July 2025) was a playback singer, dubbing artist, radio artist and actor from Kerala, India. Radhadevi was active in Malayalam radio broadcasting for seven decades. She sang in over thirty films in a span of 30 years. She received many awards including Kerala Sangeetha Nataka Akademi Fellowship, Kerala Sangeetha Nataka Akademi Award, Gurupooja Award by Kerala Sangeetha Nataka Akademi, Kerala Film Critics Award and the Kerala State Film Award for her Outstanding Contribution to Malayalam Cinema.

== Biography ==
C. S. Radhadevi was born in 1931, in Travancore, to Sivasankara Pillai and Chellamma. From a young age she was interested in dance and music. Radhadevi's first gurus were Vaikom Mani Iyer and Iraniyal Thankappan. She learned Carnatic music from Ramanatha Bhagavathar of Madras. She later studied music at the Thycaud Music Academy for one year.

=== Personal life and death ===
Radhadevi and her husband N. Narayanan Nair, who was a University Assistant Registrar, have one son N. Nandagopan. She was staying at Malikappurakkal house on Uppalam Road, Pulimoottil, Thiruvananthapuram. Radhadevi died on July 7, 2025, at her residence in Thiruvananthapuram.

== Career ==
Radhadevi started acting at the age of 13, by acting in a dance scene in the play Parivarthanam by T. N. Gopinathan Nair. She later acted in the lead role in the play Ballatha Pahayan directed by Bahadoor. Her father Sivasankara Pillai initially opposed her acting.

In 1944, at the age of 13, she made her film debut by singing and dancing to the song Murali Murali Nee Radha Manasahari with T. K. Balachandran in the movie Yachakamohini by Attar Parameswaran Pillai, but the movie has not been released. She also acted as a child actress in the Tamil film Ambikapathy. In 1948, she acted as the second heroine in the film Stree starring Thikkurissy Sukumaran Nair. Later she played the lead role in the play Ballatha Pahayan directed by actor Bahadur. Since her family didn't like her acting in movies, she couldn't continue acting.

Radhadevi has been active in the field of playback singing since the early days of Malayalam cinema. Thirunayinarkurichi Madhavan Nair brought Radhadevi to playback singing. She first sang with Yesudas' father Augustine Joseph in a song by Dakshinamurthy in the 1950 film Nallathanka. She has sung in over thirty films in a span of 30 years.

Radhadevi has been in the field of Malayalam radio broadcasting for seven decades. She started conducting musical programs in the Travancore radio station in 1942 and joined All India Radio in 1950 as an artist. While working in All India Radio, Radhadevi has entered the dubbing industry and has lent her voice in Malayalam, Tamil and Telugu films.

As a dubbing artist, Radhadevi first voiced for a child actress in the film Vanamala (1951) directed by G. Viswanath. Her first dubbing for a heroine was in the film Jnanasundari (1961). She also dubbed to characters in Malayalam films such as Sita, Snapaka Yohannan, Bhaktakuchela, Kadal, and Ana Valarthiya Vanambadi.

== Awards and honours ==
In 1983, Radhamani received the Kerala Sangeetha Nataka Akademi Award. In 2018, she was honoured with the Kerala Sangeetha Nataka Akademi Fellowship. She also received many other awards including Gurupooja Award by Kerala Sangeetha Nataka Akademi, Kerala Film Critics Award, the Tagore Jayanti Award, the Kerala State Film Award for Outstanding Contribution to Malayalam Cinema, the Natyagriham Award, TR Sukumaran Nair Memorial Award, Swathithirunal Sangeethasabha Award, Swaram Award, Bharathiyakalapeedam Sangeeta Samgama Puraskaram and the All India Radio Award for service of 60 Years.
