= Manku Thampuran =

Indian musician

Valiyamma Manku Thampuran
- Born: Valiyamma; 1914
- Died: 21 July 2011 (aged 96–97)
- Occupation: musician
- Title: First chairperson of Kerala Sangeetha Nataka Academy
- Honors: Kerala Sangeetha Nataka Academy Fellowship

Valiyamma Manku Thampuran (1914 – 21 July 2011) was an Indian musician from Kerala, who served as the first chairperson of the Kerala Sangeetha Nataka Academy. A student of Chembai Vaidyanatha Bhagavatar, she was awarded the Kerala Sangeetha Nataka Academy Fellowship for musicians in 1972. Manku Thampuran is also a recipient of the Sangeet Sabha Music Award. She also holds the distinction of being the first person to perform a live concert from Kerala in 1939 for the Madras Radio Station.
