= Thonnakkal Peethambaran =

Indian Kathakali exponent

Tonnakkal Peethambaran
- Born: 2 December 1939 (age 86); Thonnakkal, Travancore, British India
- Occupation: Kathakali exponent
- Parent(s): P. Ramakrishnan Vaidyan, G. Thankamma
- Awards: Sangeet Natak Akademi Award, Kerala state kathakali award, Kerala Sangeetha Nataka Akademi award

Tonnakkal Peethambaran is a Kathakali exponent from Kerala, India. He has been honored with several noted awards including the Kerala Sangeetha Nataka Akademi Award 2003, Sangeet Natak Akademi Award 2011 and Kerala State Kathakali Award 2014.

== Biography ==
Peethambaran was born on 2 December 1939, at Vilayil house in Thonnakkal, Chirayinkeezhu taluk in present-day Thiruvananthapuram District to ayurvedic physician P. Ramakrishnan Vaidyan and G. Thankamma. Pirappankode Kunjan Pillai was his first Guru. After studying for a while under Oyur Kochugovinda Pillai, he joined Tripunithura RLV college. His achievements as a Kathakali actor are due to the sincere discipline of Kalamandalam Krishnan Nair.

An expert in both Pacha and Kathi roles in kathakali, his Kathi roles as Duryodhana, Kichaka and Ravana characters in the stories of Duryodhana Vadham, Uttarasvayamvaram and Nizhal kuthu are famous. He has performed in many stages in India and also in foreign countries like Italy, Rome, France, England, Iran and Spain and has participated in the Edinburgh Festival. He directed and performed in Veluthampi Dalava aattakatha written by K. N. Gopala Pillai. Peethambaran also served as the Founder Secretary of Kollam Kathakali Club and President of the All Kerala Kathakali Club.

He lives in his house Nishidam at Kottiyam, Kollam district.

== Awards and honours ==
- Sangeet Natak Akademi Award 2011
- Kerala Sangeetha Nataka Akademi Award 2003
- Kerala state kathakali award 2014
- First Kathakali Shresthacharya Award
- Chennithala Chellappan Pillai Award 2012
