= Xavier Pulppatt =

Indian actor, director, and playwright (born 1951)

Xavier Pulpatt
- Born: 26 May 1951 (age 75); Aluva, Kerala, India
- Occupations: theatre actor, playwright, theatre director
- Spouse: Leelamma (KPAC Latha)
- Awards: Kerala Sangeetha Nataka Akademi Award (2005); Kerala Sangeetha Nataka Akademi Fellowship (2024)

Xavier Pulppatt is an Indian theatre actor, director, and playwright who has made contributions to various fields of stagecraft. He has won several awards, including the Kerala Sangeetha Nataka Akademi Fellowship for 2024, State Government Award for Playwriting, Direction and Presentation, the Kerala Sangeetha Nataka Akademi Award in 2005 for his contributions to the field of theatre, the Kerala Sangeetha Nataka Akademi Award for Best Amateur Drama, the Abu Dhabi Sakthi Award, the Kerala Catholic Bishops Council Award, and the Phokan Global Literary Award (USA).

== Biography ==
Xavier Pulpatt was born on May 26, 1951, at Aluva in Ernakulam district of Kerala. He lives in SN Puram in Aluva.

=== Personal life ===
Xavier is married to theatre actress Leelamma (KPAC Latha). They have two children, Adv. Sonia Shinoy Pulpat, a journalist and poet in Dubai, and Samson Xavier, a software engineer.

== Career ==
Xavier, the founder of the professional drama society Aluva Maithri Kalakendra, has served as a member of the Kerala Sahitya Akademi, vice chairman of the Kerala Sangeetha Nataka Akademi, district secretary, president and state committee member of the Purogamana Kala Sahitya Sangham. He is currently a member of the Kala Sahitya Sangham State Council. He also held the positions of State President of the national level artists' association Nanma. While he was the acting chairman of the Kerala Sangeetha Nataka Academy, he had implemented financial assistance schemes and other measures to revive drama committees that were in crisis due to COVID-19, that helped many drama artists.

== Contributions ==
He has been working in both professional and amateur theater for over fifty years as a playwright, director, actor, and theater organizer. He has written 65 plays, directed 100 plays, and published 17 original plays.

Xavier made his stage debut at the age of 15 in the play "Vedankunna Atmakkal". As of 2025, he has performed on over 600 stages.

== Awards and honors ==
In 2025 Xavier received the Kerala Sangeetha Nataka Akademi Fellowship. He has also won over 23 other awards, including the State Government Award for Playwriting, Direction and Presentation, the Kerala Sangeetha Nataka Akademi Award in 2005 for his contributions to the field of theatre, the Kerala Sangeetha Nataka Akademi Academy Award for Best Amateur Drama, the Abu Dhabi Shakti Award, the Kerala Catholic Bishops Council Award, and the Phokan Global Literary Award (USA).
