= Soviet Station Kadavu =

Malayalam-language stage play

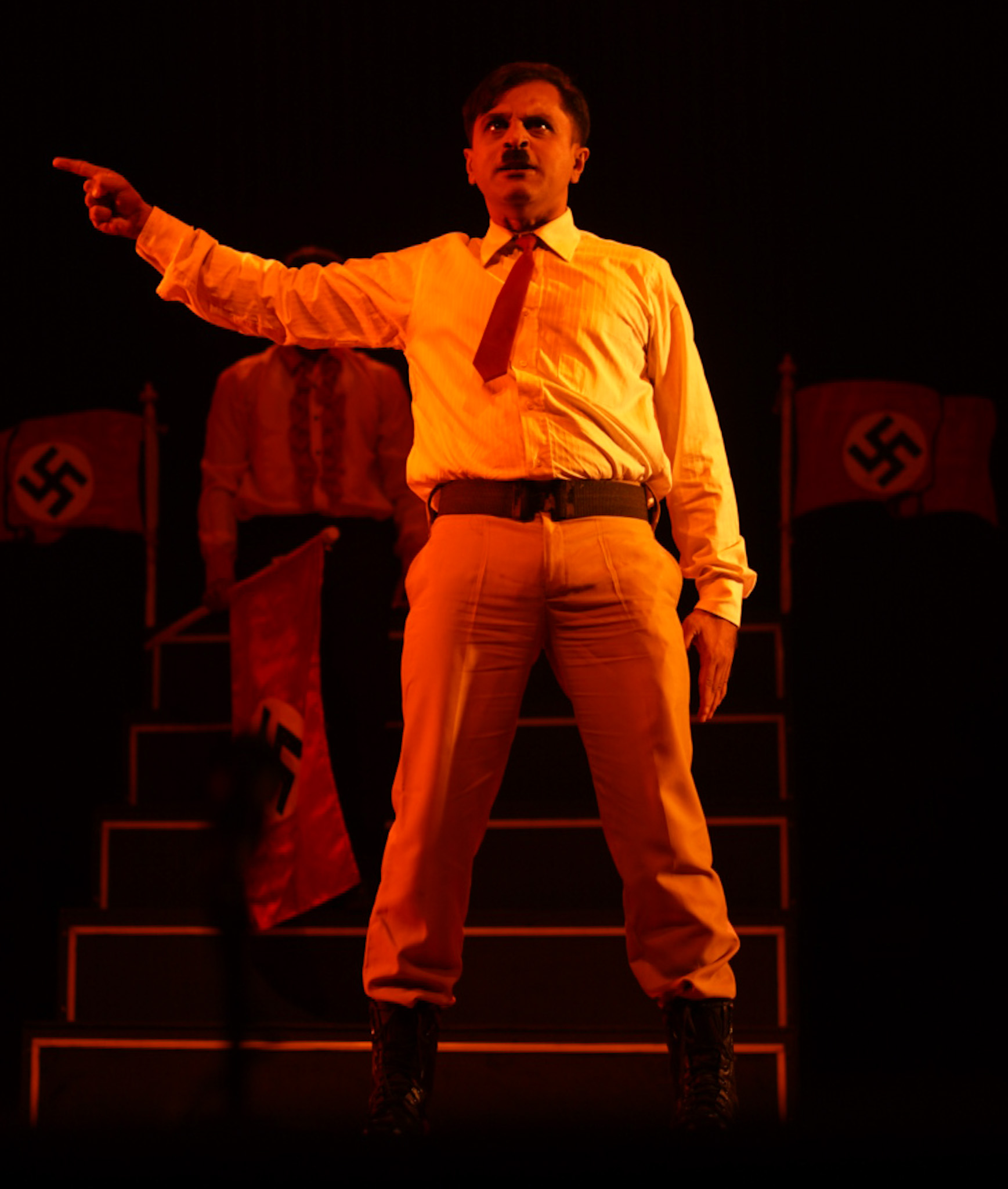
In the play Soviet Station Kadavu, the role of Adolf Hitler was performed by Kannan Nayar.

Soviet Station Kadavu is a 2022 Malayalam-language political satire play produced and staged by Kanal Samskarika Vedhi, a Thiruvananthapuram-based theatre collective, in collaboration with the Kerala Sangeetha Nataka Akademi. The play is a theatrical adaptation of a short story of the same name written by Murali Krishnan and published by Green Books.

Adapted and directed by playwright Hazim Amaravila, the play explores themes of authoritarianism and the corrupting influence of power within democratic systems. It incorporates elements of speculative fiction and has been described by media outlets as Malayalam theatre's first time-travel-themed stage play.

== Plot ==
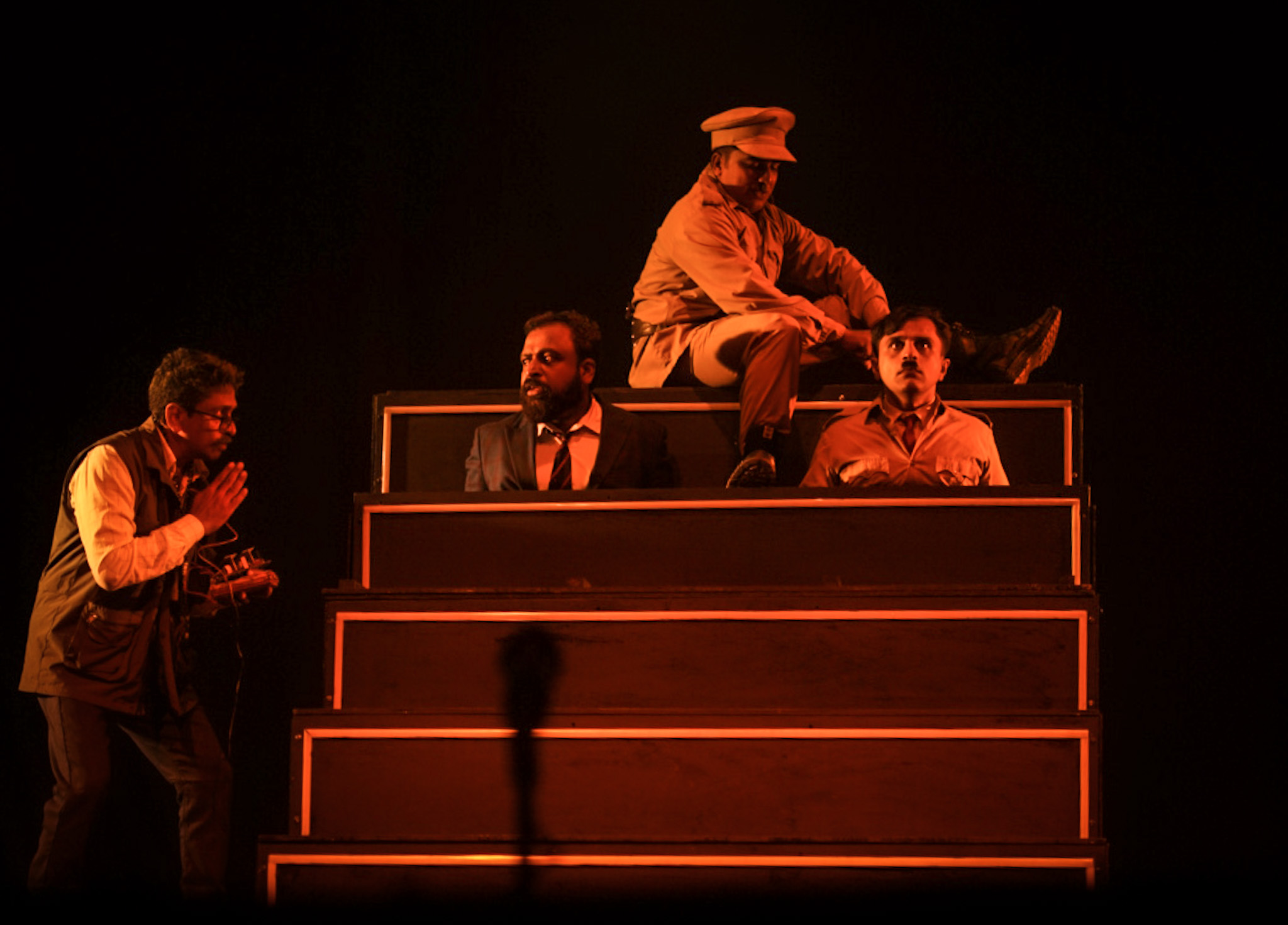
A scene from the play Soviet Station Kadavu.

Set in the 1980s, the narrative begins with Soviet leader Leonid Brezhnev experimenting with the concept of time travel to preserve the Soviet Union’s dominance as a global superpower. To explore alternate futures, he brings inventor Nikola Tesla from the 1940s to the Soviet era. They devise a plan to assassinate Adolf Hitler before World War II, intending to prevent the conflict and alter the global balance of power in favor of the USSR.

For this mission, they selected Cheerani Ravi, an apolitical youth from Kerala preparing for his PSC exams. His proximity to the Thumba ISRO facility exposed him to intense magnetic fields, granting him the rare physical resilience needed to endure time travel.

Under Brezhnev’s guidance, Ravi travels back in time to Nazi Germany. However, seduced by the allure of absolute power and his interaction with Eva Braun, Ravi abandons his original assassination mission. Instead of eliminating the dictator, he assumes Hitler's identity, ultimately becoming a more brutal and authoritarian figure than the original historical subject. The play serves as a satirical commentary on how the pursuit of power corrupts individuals.

== Cast and production ==
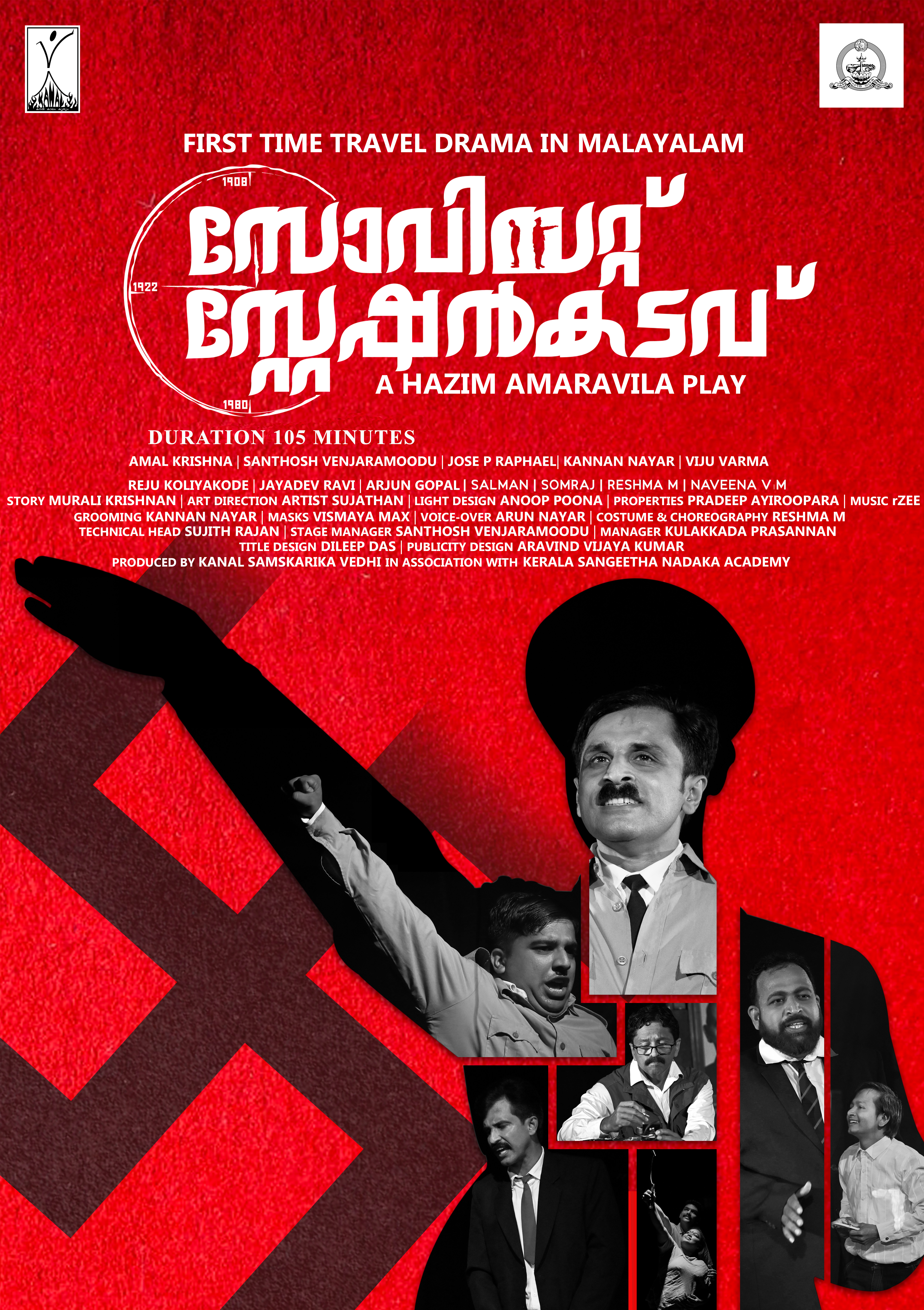
Promotional poster for Soviet Station Kadavu.

The original short story was written by Murali Krishnan, with the stage adaptation and direction independently handled by Hazim Amaravila. The technical team included Anoop Poona (lighting design), Artist Sujathan (stage design), Pradeep Ayirooppara (props), and Sujith Rajan (technical assistance).

The play was produced by Kanal Samskarika Vedhi in collaboration with the Kerala Sangeetha Nataka Akademi, and was later performed at various venues including the Bharat Murali Drama Festival.

=== Cast ===
- Kannan Nayar as Adolf Hitler
- Amal Krishna as Cheerani Ravi
- Santhosh Venjaramoodu as Leonid Brezhnev
- Jose P. Raphael as Joseph Goebbels
- Viju Varma as Nikola Tesla
- Naveena V.M. as Eva Braun
- Esha Reshma as Margo
- Reju Koliyakode as Young Hitler
- Jayadev Ravi as Hans Kammler
- Arjun Gopal as Beedi Babu
- Salman as Franz Halder
- Somaraj as Egon Schiele
