= Karivellur Murali =

Malayalam playwright and poet

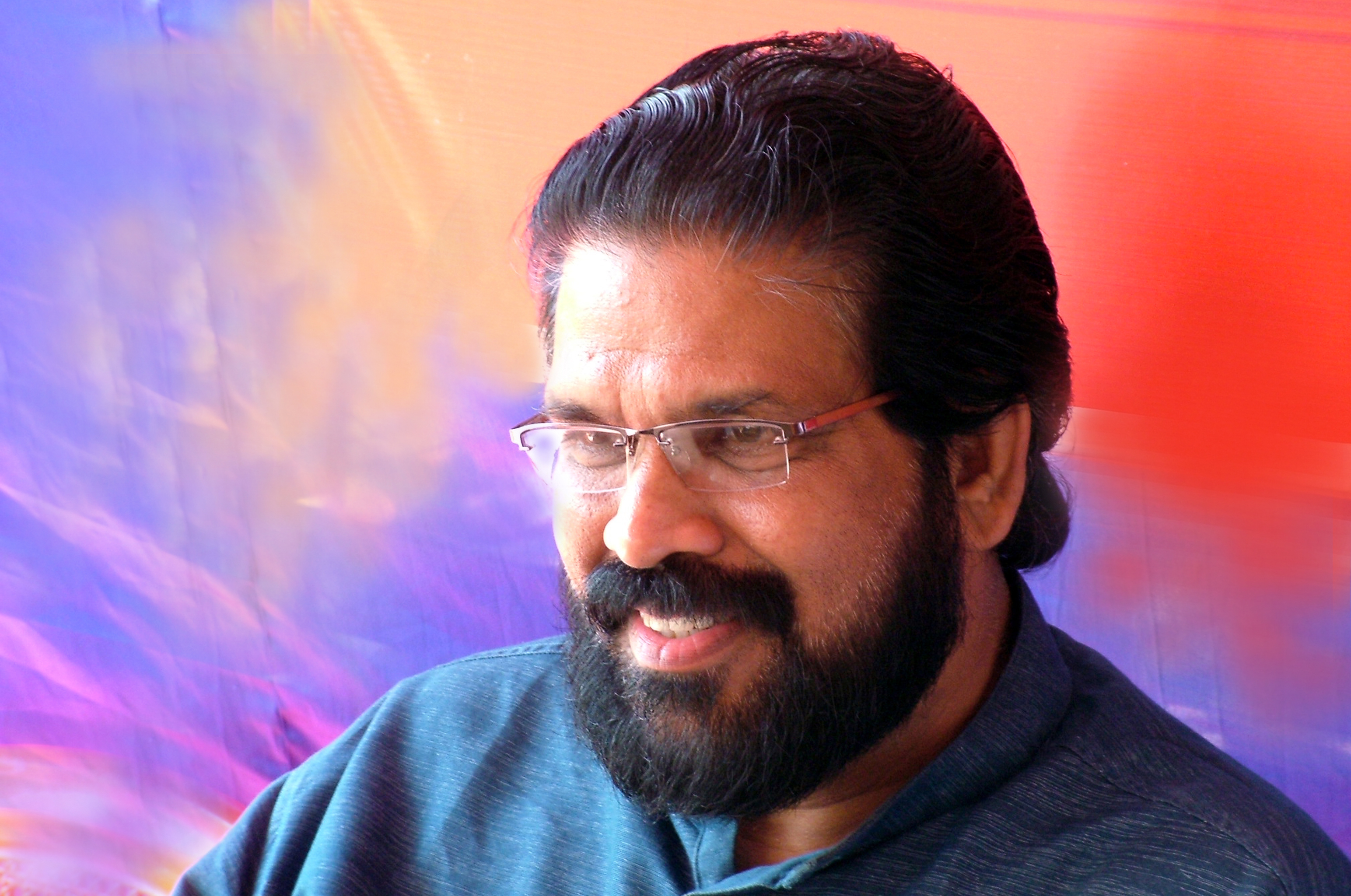
- Karivellur Murali
- Born: 15 November 1955 (age 70); Karivellur, Kerala, India
- Occupations: Poet, Lyricist, Playwright, Orator
- Spouse: Komalavalli KV
- Parent(s): A. V. Kunhambu and K. Devayani
- Awards: Kerala Sahitya Akademi Award for Drama; Kerala Sangeetha Nataka Akademi Fellowship

Karivellur Murali is a Malayalam language poet and playwright from Kerala, India. He has won many awards including the Kerala Sahitya Akademi Award for Drama, Kerala Sangeetha Nataka Akademi Award and Kerala Sangeetha Nataka Akademi Fellowship.

== Life ==
Murali was born on 15 November 1955, to communist leader A. V. Kunhambu and K. Devayani at Karivellur in the then Malabar district. Started career in Kannur Keltron from 1976, he retired on 30 November 2013 as Senior Stores Officer in Kannur Keltron. His wife is State Bank of India employee K. V. Komalavalli. He was the President of Keltron Employees Association (CITU) for 20 years.

== Career in art and literature ==
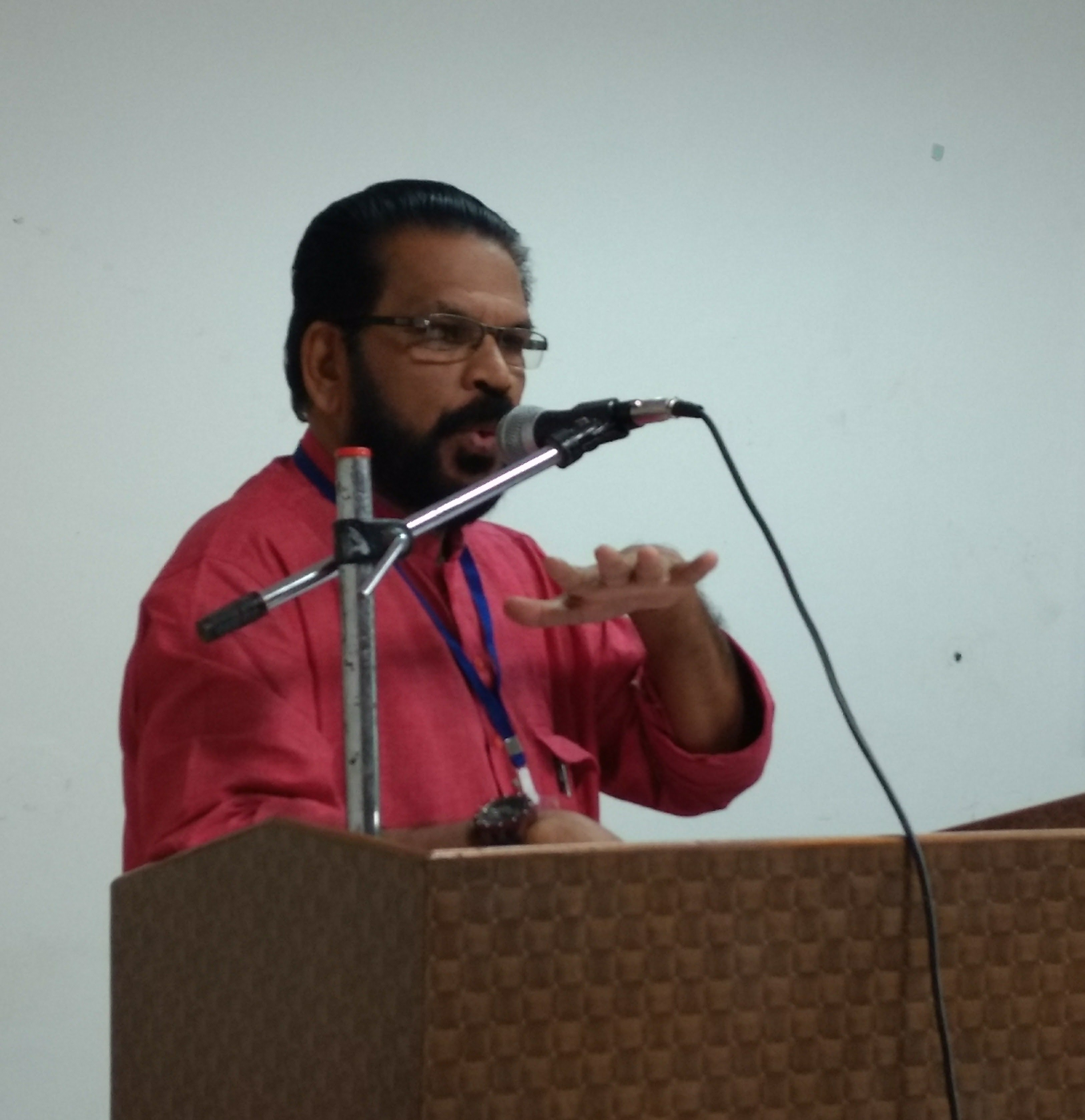
Karivellur Murali speaking at a literature camp in Mumbai, January 2018

Karivellur Murali started writing poems and songs from childhood. He started his acting career at the age of 10 by acting in the play Smarakam written by KK Eiyakkad and staged on Karivellur Martyrs' Day in 1966. After that he played different characters in many plays. He actively collaborated in the theater activities of many regional art societies like Karivellur Janashakti, Karivellur Central Arts Club, Aroli Shantiprabha, Kallyassery Kavita Theatres, Kadamperi Yuvajana Kala Samiti etc. He has been voicing characters in Akashvani radio dramas for 40 years.

Karivellur Murali's first poetry collection Ente Chonna Mannain Pattu was published in 1982. The work contains a poem about the Karivellur struggle led by his father Kunhambu. At the age of twenty-one, he wrote the play Aparajitaran Ratti for the first time. The play received five awards at the Kannur district level competition conducted by Kerala Shastra Sahitya Parishad.

In 1977, he wrote and directed the street play 'Patayottam', one of the first street plays of Kerala. After that he became a prominent proponent of street theater, open air theater and Kala jatha movement in Kerala.

In 1987, a theater group called Sangha Chetana was formed in Kannur. He was its founding secretary. Later he led the Kannur Sangh Chetana for 17 years. Many of his works have been translated into other languages. In 1998, Murali's play Che Guevera, staged by Sangha Chetana, won six state awards. The play was performed in about three hundred venues in a year. He has also written many poems and essays.

Murali has written about sixty plays, and also wrote and directed plays and Wrote poems for the Kala Jathas (art walk) conducted by the Kerala Sastra Sahitya Parishad for 25 years from 1980 to 2015. He also made theater activities active by collaborating with theater groups like Keltron Club, Kalyasseri Kavita Theatres and Aroli Shantiprabha.

In 2003, he wrote and directed Rajita Madhu's one-act play 'Abu Backerinte umma paranjath (meaning:Abu Bakar's Umma Says)' which achieved a record of 2802 performances.

He held several positions including Purogamana Kala Sahitya Sangam District Secretary, President, State Secretary, Member of Executive Committee of Kerala Sangeetha Nataka Academy, Member of Executive Committee of Kerala Press Academy etc. In 2022 Karivellur Murali was selected as the secretary of Kerala Sangeetha Nataka Academy.

== Works ==
=== Plays ===
- Aparajitharude rathri
- Agrayanam
- Samghaganam
- Jacob Alexander enthinu athmahathya cheythu?
- Vishwanathan odikkindirikkunnu
- Abubakkarinte umma parayunnu
- Kuruthippadam
- Che Guevara
- Kalarakkunjamma orkkunnu
- Ee bhoomi arudeth?

=== Books ===
- Karivellur (in Malayalam). Insight Publica. 2022. ISBN 9789390535149. (political history of Karivellur)
- Maravum kuttiyum (play)
- Ente chuvanna manninte pattu (poetry collection)
- Karivellur Murali yude kavithakal (poetry collection)
- The first comprehensive drama history of Kerala with an autobiographical touch, Natakakaran enna nilayil ente jeevitham, has been completed and is now in print.

=== Documentary ===
The documentary Chenchorapoovukal wrote and directed by him, about the brilliant struggles and martyrs of Kerala has aired on Kairali TV, in 50 episodes.

== Awards ==
- Kerala Sangeetha Nataka Akademi Fellowship 2021
- Kerala Sahitya Akademi Award for Drama 2000 (Che Guevara)
- Kerala Sangeetha Nataka Akademi Award 2006
- Kerala Government Professional Theatre Awards 2021 - Award for best play song
- Abu Dhabi Sakthi Award (Che Guevara)
- KSK Thalikulam Award (Che Guevara)
- Kala Kuwait Sambasivan Award for overall contribution to the field of theatre, art, culture and literature
- 11th Sivaramapilla Award
- Mullanezhi Award (2015)
- Cherukad Award 2016 (Ee bhoomi arudeth)
- Kerala Sangeetha Nataka Academy Award for Best Drama Song Composition (2017)
- PK Narayanan Master Award (2018)
- The first EK Ayamu Trust Award for overall contribution to the field of theatre
- 2024 P J Antony Award by the P J Antony Foundation.
