= Kumara Varma =

Indian theatre director (born 1945)

Kumara Varma

Kumara Varma (born April 1945) is an Indian theatre director. To date, he has directed at least thirty-six Indian and Western plays during the past five decades, including Raja Oedipus, Urubhangam, Mattavilasam, Abhijnana Shakuntalam, Ashadh Ka Ek Din, Baaki Itihas, Uddhwast Dharmashala, Six Characters in Search of an Author, Death Watch, Agg De Kaleere ("Blood Wedding") and Leedli Nagari ki Neeti Katha ("The Visit").

== Biography ==
Kumara Varma was born in April 1945 in Mavelikkara, Kerala. After completing his BSc, he joined the National School of Drama in 1964 and left in 1967 with the prestigious Bharat Puraskar and Girish Ghosh Puraskar. During 1967–68, he worked in the Repertory Company of the NSD and directed Hori (a dramatized version of Premchand’s Godaan) for which the set was designed by Ebrahim Alkazi.

Between 1968 and 1973 Kumara Varma was actively involved in the Natakakalari movement (New-theatre Movement) in Kerala, organizing workshops and directing plays in collaboration with playwrights such as C. N. Srikanthan Nair, G. Sankara Pillai and Kavalam Narayana Panikkar. Some of his productions of this period include Nair's Saketam, Pillai's Bandi and Panikkar's Sakshi.

Varma joined the Faculty of the Department of Indian Theatre at Panjab University in 1973 as Lecturer and later became Professor. He has also chaired the Department and has been the Dean of the Faculty of Design and Fine Arts. He was also formerly a Secretary of the Punjab University Teachers Association (PUTA). Kumara Varma was awarded the Italian Government Scholarship in 1979 and studied the History of Theatre and Drama at the University of Rome. Besides having represented India in the UNESCO World Theatre Conference at Paris in 1980, he has also studied theatre in many countries. He received the Kerala Sangeetha Nataka Akademi Fellowship in 2016.

== Productions ==
=== 2000 ===
- Leedli Nagari Ki Neeti Katha (2001), a Hindi adaptation of Friedrich Dürrenmatt's The Visit by Kumara Varma for the Department of Indian Theatre, P. U., Chandigarh
- Ahijnana Shakuntalam (2001), by Kālidāsa for the National School of Drama, New Delhi
- Agg De Kaleere (April 2003), a Punjabi adaptation of Garcia Lorca's Blood Wedding by Surjeet Pattar for the Department of Theatre & Television, Punjabi University, Patiala
- Teen Bhautik Shastri (2004), a Hindi translation of Friedrich Dürrenmatt's The Physicists for the Department of Indian Theatre, P. U., Chandigarh
- Ek Dalit Yuvati Ki Dukh Bhari Dastan (2005), a Hindi adaptation of M. Mukudan's Oru Dalit Yuvatiyude Kadana Katha for the Repertory Company of the National School of Drama, New Delhi
- Warren Hastings Ka Saand (2008), a stage adaptation of Uday Prakash's Hindi short story for the Department of Indian Theatre, P.U., Chandigarh.
- "Begum Panikkar",(2012), a Malayalam adaptation of Satish Alekar's Marathi play "Begum Barve" for the Department of Theatre, Sri Sankaracharya University of Sanskrit, Kalady, Kerala.
- "Andorra", (2014), Malayalam translation of Max Frisch's play "Andorra" by S. Sunil Kumar for the School of Drama & Fine Arts, University of Clicut, Thrissur.

=== 1990 ===
- Shehar Hamara (1990), a Hindi adaptation of Thornton Wilder's Our Town for the Department of Indian Theatre, P. U., Chandigarh
- Death Watch (1991), by Jean Genet for Sahridaya Sangam, Chandigarh
- Uspar (1993), a Punjabi adaptation of Arthur Miller's A View from the Bridge for Sahridaya Sangam, Chandigarh
- Rishte Hi Rishte (1994), a Hindi adaptation of Thornton Wilder's The Matchmaker for the Department of Indian Theatre, P. U., Chandigarh
- Bury the Dead (1996), by Irwin Shaw for the Department of Indian Theatre, P. U., Chandigarh
- Jana Shatru (1999), a Hindi adaptation of Henrik Ibsen's An Enemy of the People by J. N. Kaushal for the Department of Indian Theatre, P. U., Chandigarh

=== 1980 ===
- Six Characters in Search of an Author (1980), by Luigi Pirandello for the Department of Indian Theatre, P. U., Chandigarh
- Mattavilasam (1982–83), by Mahendra Vikrama Varman for the Department of Indian Theatre, P. U., Chandigarh
- Urubhang (1984), by Bhasa for the Department of Indian Theatre, P. U., Chandigarh
- Men Without Shadows (1985), by Jean-Paul Sartre for the Department of Indian Theatre, P. U., Chandigarh
- Agg De Kaleere (1986), a Punjabi adaptation of Garcia Lorca's Blood Wedding by Surjit Pattar for the Department of Indian Theatre, P. U., Chandigarh

=== 1970 ===
- Jabala Satyakaman (1970), by Kavalam Narayana Panikkar for Koothamplam, Alleppey
- Kakkarissanatakam (1970), a folk play from Kerala for the Department of Tourism, Kerala state
- Bhagavadajjukam (1971), by Bhodhayana for Kerala Sangeet Natak Akademi
- Enikkusesham (1972), by Kavalam Narayana Panikkar for Thiruvarang, Alleppey
- Daivathar (1973), by Kavalam Narayana Panikkar for Thiruvarang, Alleppey
- A Doll's House (1973), by Henrik Ibsen for the Department for Indian Theatre, Panjab University, Chandigarh
- Baaqui Itihas (1975), by Badal Sircar, for Indian Arts Revival Group, Chandigarh
- Ashadh Ka Ek Din (1976), by Mohan Rakesh, Janvadi Rang Manch, Chandigarh
- The House of Bernarda Alba (1976), by Lorca for Sutradhar, Chandigarh
- Durmati Bhanda Phoota (Tartuffe) (1977), by Molière for the Department of Indian Theatre, P. U., Chandigarh
- Ottayan (1977), by Kavalam Narayana Panikkar for Thiruvarang, Trivandrum
- Raja Oedipus (1978), by Sophocles for the Department of Indian Theatre, P. U., Chandigarh
- Uddhvast Dharmashala (1979), by Govind Deshpandey for Natika

=== 1960 ===
- Chakra (1967), by Vidyadhar Pundalik for the National School of Drama
- Hori (Godan) (1967), by Premchand for the Repertory Company of the National School of Drama, New Delhi
- Bandi (1968), by G. Sankara Pillai for Suvarnarekha, Trivandrum
- Sakshi (1968), by Kavalam Narayana Panikkar for Koothapalam, Alleppey
- Kazhukanmar (1968), by G. Sankara Pillai for The Dramatic Club, Cashew Board, Quilon
- Saketam (1969), by C. N. Srikantan Nair for Suvarnarekha, Trivandrum
- Thiruvazhithan (1969), by Kavalam Narayana Panikkar for Koothamplam, Alleppey
