= Mankompu Sivasankara Pillai =

Kathakali artist

Mankompu Sivasankara Pillai, of Kerala in south India, was a Kathakali artist of the classical dance-drama's southern style. Noted for his consummate depiction of pachcha, kathi and minukku roles, he is a disciple of Chenganoor Raman Pillai.

Born in Mankompu of Kuttanad belt in Alappuzha district, Pillai has also learnt Kathakali from Kalarkode Kuttappa Panikkar, Thakazhi Ayyappan Pillai and Thottam Sankaran Namboodiri. In 1966, he was inducted as a teacher in Kerala Kalamandalam, where he served for long. In 1985, he was accorded the Sangeet Natak Akademi Award and was conferred Sangeet Natak Akademi Tagore Ratna. In 1989, he received the Kerala Sangeetha Nataka Akademi Award.

In 2006, Mankompu, with his brother C.K. Sivarama Pillai, brought out a book, Kathakali Swaroopam, that deals with the evolution, grammar and aesthetics of the art form in the Travancore region. He died on 20 March 2014 due to a massive cerebral hemorrhage.
