= Champakulam Pachu Pillai =

Indian Kathakali exponent

- Born: 1907; Champakkulam, Travancore, British India
- Died: 10 May 2004 (aged 96–97)
- Occupation: Kathakali exponent
- Parent(s): Kaipilly Sankarapilla, Madhaviyamma
- Awards: Sangeet Natak Akademi Award, Kerala state kathakali award, Kerala Sangeetha Nataka Akademi award and fellowship

Champakulam Pachu Pillai is a Kathakali exponent from Kerala, India. He was a specialist in the thadi or bearded roles in kathakali. He has been honored with several noted awards including the Sangeet Natak Akademi Award 1983, Kerala Sangeetha Nataka Akademi Award 1969 and Kerala Kalamandalam Award 1991.

== Biography ==
Pachu Pillai was born in Perumanur family in Champakulam village of Alappuzha district in 1907 as eldest son of Madhaviyamma and Kaipilly Sankarapilla. The Perumannur family was one of the main tributaries of the Kaplinjedal Kathakalichitta known as the Southern Chitta in Kathakali performance. Guru Gopinath, a famous dancer and choreographer, is his younger brother. Pillai started learning kathakali from his maternal uncle Champakulam Sanku Pillai at the age of 14. He made his debut at the age of 16, as Rukman in Rukminiswayamvaram kathakali performed at the Nedumudi Mathur Bhagwati Temple. According to the Guru's wishes, Patchu Pillai joined the Mathur Kathakali yogam in which he was also a member. The 1993 Kathakali Festival organized by Sangeet Natak Academy in Delhi was inaugurated by Patchu Pillai.

Pachu Pillai's notable roles include rough and heroic characters like Dushasana, Bali, Trigarthan Bakan, Kali and Nakrathundi.

He died on 10 May 2004, at the age of 98.

== Awards and honors ==
- Kerala Sangeetha Nataka Akademi Award 1969
- Kerala Kalamandalam Award 1991
- Sangeet Natak Akademi Award 1983
- Kerala state Kathakali Award 2002
- Kerala Sangeetha Nataka Akademi Fellowship 1982
- Gold Medal at Kerala Kalamandalam Silver Jubilee Celebrations
- Patchupillai was honored by rulers of Travancore like Thirunal Maharani and Chithira Thirunal Maharaja.
