= A. V. Kunjambu =

Indian politician

A.V. Kunjambu

Personal details
- Born: 10 April 1908 Karivellur, Kannur
- Died: 8 June 1980 (aged 72) Kannur
- Party: Communist Party of India (Marxist)
- Spouse: K. Devayani
- Children: Radha, Karivellur Murali, Jayadevan Balachandran, Adv Vijayakumar, Malathi, Bhasura
- Occupation: Politician

A. V. Kunjambu (1908-1980) was an Indian politician who took part in the Karivellur agitation and played an important role in the formation of the Communist Party in Travancore. He worked for the welfare of the working class till the end of his life.

A.V. Kunjambu could not complete his education, due to the personal struggles. He joined the national movement at an early age. As a member of the Congress Party he engaged in various struggles and got imprisoned several times. Disillusioned with the working style and policies of the Congress, Kunjambu later took interest in revolutionary ideas. His acquaintance with P.Krishna Pillai opened the way for socialist thoughts, and he willingly came forward to organize the peasants in Malabar. He was one of the founding members of Communist Party in Kerala. When the Communist Party got split in 1964, he sided with the CPI(M).

He has been a member of the CPI(M) state committee since its inception. He was also the District Secretary of Kannur for a long time. In the Third Kerala Legislative Assembly and the Fourth Kerala Legislative Assembly, he represented Payyannur constituency. Further, he was a member of the Rajya Sabha from 1957 to 1958. He married Communist leader and freedom fighter, K. Devyani. He has six children, including the famous poet Karivellur Murali. His eldest daughter Radha has passed away.

== Early life ==
He was born on 10 April 1908 in Acham House, Karivellur to Uchiramma and Thoton Raman Nair of Cheruvathur Kuttam. Kunjambu lived with his mother at his uncle's house as a child, as the police deported his father Raman Nair to the Andaman and Nicobar Islands for organizing against British colonialism. His father died when he was one year old and his mother left him when he was six years old. He later grew up under the care of his uncle. He could not study beyond the fifth class due to his difficult family situations. After that he went to work at the house of a distant relative who was also a landlord, but did not stay there for long due to excessive exploitation of his labour. He came back and helped his uncle with the stone cutting work. He used to go to many houses to read Ramayana and Krishna songs. As a child, Kunjambu was profoundly aware of the changes in national politics during his time.

== Politics ==
He entered politics by participating in a march of freedom fighters in Payyanur. In 1930, while visiting the festival at the Trichambaram Sri Krishna Temple, he came across K. Kelappan and listened to his speech, which helped him to anchor his political consciousness. After this, Kunjambu left home to join the Congress party. He was imprisoned in Kadakat in 1932 for violating the Forest Act. He also participated in toddy shop picketing, salt satyagraha and foreign clothing shops picketing. He was imprisoned several times. In prison he had the opportunity to interact closely with the national revolutionaries. The prison life moulded Kunjambu's revolutionary consciousness. Following this, on 13 April 1934, the Abhinava Bharat Yuvak Sangh was formed at Karivellur on the model of the Navajavan Party formed by Bhagat Singh. He was the founder and main activist of this group. Abhinava Bharat Yuvak Sangham has done a lot of public work to attract people to its activities. At the same time, he did not break his relations with the Congress party. Vagbhatanandan, the great poet Kuttamath, K. Kelappan, T.S. Thirumump and others came to Karivellur and worked with him.

== Communist Politics ==
P Krishna Pillai led A.V. Kunjambu to the Congress Socialist Party and later to the Communist Party. His acquaintance with Krishnapillai inspired Kunhambu to join the socialist thinking. Kunjambu went on to become the leader of the Congress Socialist Party. Before the formation of the All India Kisan Sabha, Kunjambu had tried to organize farmers of Karivellur for building a radical peasant movement. His leadership in struggles forced the landlords of the area to give up violence and feudal levies.

At a meeting held at Parappuram in Pinarayi, the members of the Congress Socialist Party had become communists. The Communist Party was banned for its anti-war activities, and orders were released to arrest them. Subsequently, in 1942, Travancore became the area of operation of A.V. Kunjambu. He played an important role in laying the foundation of the Communist Party in Travancore. He assumed the post of Secretary of the Party in Travancore. From 1942 to 1944 he served as the Travancore State Secretary of the party. When he was released from jail in the Karivellur case, he again went into hiding because of ban on the Communist Party. In 1964, he resigned from the National Council of CPI and stood by the CPI (M) when it was formed. He was imprisoned again along with other leaders, he later served as a Rajya Sabha member and MLA.

He died on 8 June 1980.

== Positions held ==
- Organising Secretary and President Akhila Bharatha Youvajana Sanghom.
- Secretary of CPI Travancore State Committee, CPI Malabar Committee.
- Secretary of CPI (M) Cannanore District Committee.
- Working Committee Member and Treasurer, All India Kissan Sabha.
- Member, CPI State Secretariat and National Council.
- CPI (M) State Committee Member.
- Member of Legislative Assembly in third and fourth Kerala Legislative Assembly from Payyannur constituency.
- Member, Rajya Sabha (1957–58).
