= Poonithura =

- Ward
- Interactive map of Poonithura
- Coordinates: 9.937°N 76.334°E
- Country: India
- State: Kerala
- District: Ernakulam

Languages
  - Official: Malayalam, English
- Time zone: UTC+5:30 (IST)

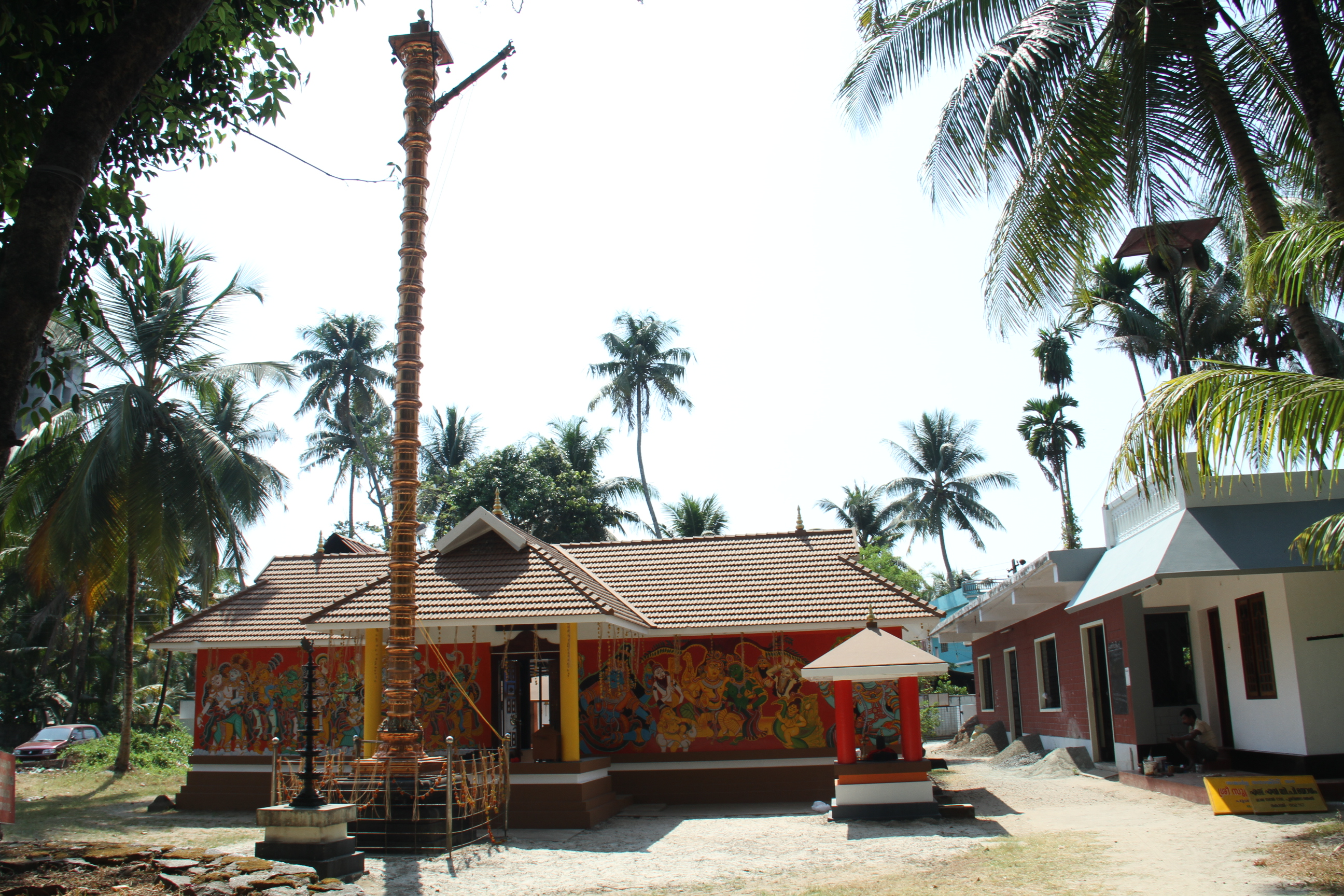
Subramania Temple

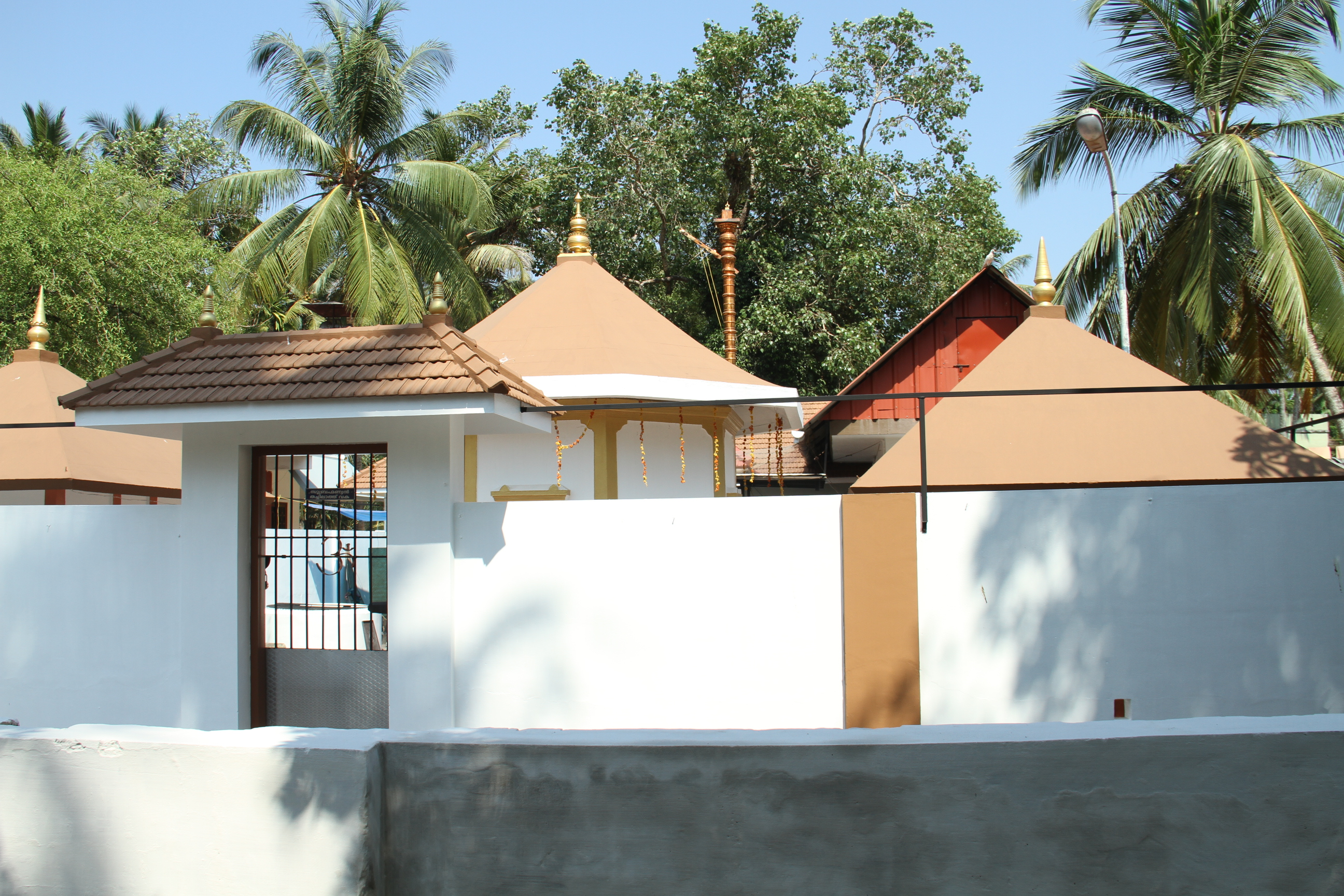
Back view of the temple

Poonithura is a ward of Kochi, Kerala. It features one of the popular temples in Ernakulam, the Poonithura Sree Krishna Swamy Temple, which is the "Moolasthanam" (original place) of Lord Sree Poornathrayeesa, the national deity of the erstwhile Kingdom of Kochi and the guardian of Tripunithura.

As per traditional lore, it is referred to in the Mahabharata as the place where Arjuna build the temple for Lord Krishna in the Chapter of Santhana Gopalam. It is believed that this happened here and later on the temple was moved to Tripunithura. The temple here is called Poonithura Kottaram Sree Krishna Swami Temple. The annual 'Ashtamirohini' festival is celebrated with much fanfare by the local residents.

== Etymology ==
Pooni means the "containment for arrows ", Thura means "sea shore" . The belief is that Arjuna dropped his "pooni" before Lord Krishna as a sign of accepting defeat in the great Kurukshetra war.

== The Para Utsavam ==
The Para Ultsavam (or Para Festival) is an annual tradition celebrated in the Malayalam month of Kumbham ((February–March) associated with Sree Poornathrayeesa Temple and Poonithura Kottaram Sree Krishna Temple during which the deity Sree Poornathrayeesan goes out of the temple to visit his original abode, and on the way, visit the homes of his devotees by crossing the Poorna river which separates Poonithura and Thripunithura by a Vanji (boat) and then continues the rest of his journey on top of a decorated temple elephant.

The festival lasts for 8 days during which the Lord travels to visit nearby temples and family manas (ancestral homes).

On the 2nd and 3rd day of the festival, the Lord visits his original place, Poonithura Kottaram Temple and the devotees fill a Para (a traditional measuring vessel) with paddy (Nellu), rice flakes (Aval), jaggery, or flowers as the deity arrives at their doorstep on an ornated elephant.

On the 6th day of the festival, the idol of the Lord is taken to Vadakkedathu Mana. According to legend, Nangema Antherjanam of Vadakkedathu Mana was an ardent devotee of Sree Poornathrayeesha from a very young age and considered him her consort. But her parents decided to conduct her Veli (the traditional wedding in Namboothiri families) with a groom from a distant place when she became a teenager. But Nangema could not leave her divine love behind. One evening, standing before the Garbhagriham of the Sree Poornathrayeesha Temple, she began to cry with sorrow. It is said that the Lord heard her and asked her to join him and that she became his eternal consort, never to be seen again. On the 6th day of the Para festival, the Lord visits his wife's ancestral home and gives gifts and blessings to her family.

On the 8th day, the Lord and his entourage returns to Tripunithura. The festival is seen as the time when the "Lord" of the land visits his subjects, making it a very personal and emotional festival for the local residents.

== Poonithura and Tripunithura ==
Although Poonithura and Tripunithura are adjacent places, Poonithura comes under Kochi Municipal Corporation, whereas Tripunithura is a municipality of its own.

Earlier, the entire area used to known as Poonithura. Later the King of the Princely state of Kochi shifted his capital to this area from Thrissur. He built palaces and forts on the land which is located on the eastern banks of Poorna River. Since then the area near the new settlement started to be known as Thiru Poonithura, 'Thiru' being the word in local Malayalam language to express respect. Later it became Tripunithura.

== Notable people from Poonithura ==
- M.S Tripunithura, Cine artist
- Tripunithura N. Radhakrishnan, Ghatam exponent
