= Mavelikkara S. R. Raju =

Kerala musician

Mavelikara S. R. Raju is a Carnatic music percussionist who plays the mridangam. He studied with Mavelikara Krishnankutty Nair.

In 1958 he joined All India radio as a mridangam player. In 1999 Kerala Sangeetha Nadaka Academy gave him a fellowship. He received the Kerala Sangeetha Nataka Akademi Award in 1985 and the Kerala Sangeetha Nataka Akademi Fellowship in 1999.
