= T. Subrahmanian Thirumump =

Indian poet and communist leader

T. Subramanian Thirumumpu
- Born: 12 June 1906; Cheruvathur, Kasaragod district
- Died: 29 November 1984 (aged 78)
- Occupations: Freedom Fighter, Poet
- Political party: Indian National Congress; Congress Socialist Party; Communist Party of India
- Spouse: Karthyanikuttyamma
- Children: Six children

T. Subrahmanian Thirumump (also spelled as Thirumunp) (12 June 1906 – 29 November 1984) was a poet, freedom fighter and one of the earliest communist leaders from Kerala, India. He wrote many patriotic songs during the Indian independence movement, and later in his life he translated many famous Sanskrit works into Malayalam.

== Biography ==
Thazhekattu Thimirimanayil Subramanian Thirumumpu was born to Subramanian Namboothiri who is a native of Vaikom and Pappiamma on 12 June 1906 at Thazhekattu thimirimanayil house, Cheruvathur in Kasaragod district. After completing his education at Payyanur High School, he wanted to go to Mangalore or Kozhikode for higher studies but his family denied it. He learned Sanskrit and poetry from his uncle. He was born into a Brahmin family and was soon drawn into the national independence movement. Unnikrishnan Thirumump, who was the eldest brother and Hareeswaran Thirumump, the elder brother of T.S from the Thazhakkatt Mana were also freedom fighters on their own right and were popularly known as thirumump brothers. Yet another Thirumump, their nephew popularly known as Hareeswaran Thirumunp (Junior) also took a very active role in the national movement. He, along with his brothers took part in many struggles including the Salt Satyagraha and the Guruvayoor Satyagraha. He was imprisoned for participating in the freedom movement, and he along with his two brothers were excommunicated from Brahmin for going to jail. He wrote the patriotic songs sung at the Salt Satyagraha procession at Payyanur.

His wife Karthyanikuttyamma was also communist and freedom fighter. They have six children Bharathikutty, Venugopalan, Poornachandran, Prasanna Kumari, Sudhakaran and Lathakumari.

== Political activism ==
The incident in which Lala Lajpat Rai was harassed and the Congress meeting held in Payyanur lit up his patriotism. He later said that the martyrdom of Yatindradas was emotional to himself. He slowly began to take part in the activities of the Congress party. He was one of the volunteers of the Fourth State Congress of the Congress held at Payyanur in 1928. He was one of the leader of the Sawarna Jatha associated with the Guruvayoor Temple Satyagraha, led by P. Krishna Pillai, K. Kelappan, Mannath Padmanabhan and AKG, later he led the Harijan Jatha also.

Abhinav Bharat Yuvak Sangham led by Karivellur activist A.V. Kunjambu has been instrumental in building the communist movement in Malabar. He requested to join the Abhinav Bharat at its 1938 conference, in which he was one of the organizer. Since he was over 25 years old, the organization denied that. He met the leaders at the conference but to no avail. He then asked for permission to recite a poem at the beginning of the conference, although he was not a member, the leaders allowed it. The poem Ente yuvatwam (literally meaning 'My Youth') was written the night before. Through the poem he questioned whether age is a barrier to joining the organization. Every line in the poem shows the courage of young people who do not compromise with social realities. Soon the poem became passion of the youth and later sounded all over Malabar as the fuel for the anti-British feudal struggle. Communist leader and first chief minister of Kerala E.M.S. Namboodiripad had called him padunna padaval (literally meaning singing sword) for inspiring the masses with his progressive ideals. AKG has honored him giving the 'Lenin mudra'. Following this he was appointed as the President of the Akhila Kerala Kisan Sangh (All Kerala Farmers group). He was one of the main leaders behind the farmers struggles led by the Communist Party in North Malabar. During World War II time, he was imprisoned again for making anti-war speeches in Kayyur and Thuruthi. He was imprisoned in Kannur Jail and Bellari Jail.

He was one of the two delegates from the then Kasargod taluk at the Second Party Congress of CPI in 1948. When CPI approved the BT Ranadive Thesis that says armed revolution is the way of Liberation in India, he left communism and active politics, saying, "British imperial hegemony is over here, Is it not enough to win the rights of the peasants and workers through democratic means? Why the revolutionary way?" Then he immersed himself in the spiritual life and translated many spiritual works into Malayalam.

== Literary contributions ==
He started writing hymns at the age of ten and at the age of thirteen he wrote the Markandeya Purana, a poem of seven verses. His first published work Srikaran was written at the age of fourteen. The poem Dharma Parikshanam published in Yuva Bharat was banned and the weekly in which it was printed was confiscated. The poet and the editor were sentenced to nine months' rigorous imprisonment.

He translated famous Sanskrit works like Devi Bhagavatam, Devi Mahatmyam, Mahabhagavatam, Soundarya Lahari, Vishnu Bhagavatam, Durgasapthasati, Srimad-Shankara Digvijayam, Bhadrakali Mahatmyam, Mrinakopanishad etc. into Malayalam. His poetry collection Smaranakal, Kavitakal (Meaning: Memories, poems) was published by Kerala Sahithya Akademi. Other literary works include Vandematharam, Vikasam, Navothanam (poetry collection), and translations of some selected poems from Vivekananda sahithya sarvaswam.

== Awards and honors ==
He was awarded with positions such as Bhaktakavi Tilak, Vidyarathanam and Sahitya Nipunan.

== Society and culture ==
His house named Ravipuram residence, acquired by the Kerala Agricultural University in 1980 was renovated in 2014, to be used as the Centre for Studies on Farming Culture. In 2020, in his memory, the Government of Kerala started the construction of the TS Thirumump Cultural Complex at Kasargod Madikai. The school TS Thirumunp Smaraka Vidyalaya in Thrikaripur Kasargod district is named after him.

Rahul Gandhi, who campaigned in Kerala during the 2011 Assembly elections, aimed at the age of the V. S. Achuthanandan and said that if the LDF came to power again, Kerala would have a 93-year-old Chief Minister. Later, at a small event held in Palakkad, Achuthanandan replied to this by singing the poem Ente yuvatwam by Thirumump.
