= Trivandrum V. Surendran =

Indian mridangam exponent

- Born: V. Surendran; August 14, 1942 (age 84); Edappazhanji, Travancore (present-day Thiruvananthapuram, Kerala)
- Citizenship: India
- Occupation: Musician
- Spouse: K. Suseela
- Children: 2
- Awards: Sangeet Natak Akademi Award; Kerala Sangeetha Nataka Akademi Fellowship; Kerala Sangeetha Nataka Akademi Award
- Musical career
- Genre: Carnatic music
- Instrument: Mridangam

Trivandrum V. Surendran is a mridangam exponent from Kerala, India. He received several awards including the Sangeet Natak Akademi Award, Kerala Sangeetha Nataka Akademi Fellowship, Kerala Sangeetha Nataka Akademi Award, and Madras Music Academy Award.

== Biography ==
V. Surendran was born on August 14, 1942 at Thiruvananthapuram, Kerala. A native of Edappazhanji of Thiruvananthapuram, he learned instrumental lessons from his uncle P. Gangadharan Nair. Surendran graduated from Swathi Thirunal College of Music, Thiruvananthapuram in the first batch of 1959. He completed Ganabhushanam course from there in 1962. After studying mridangam for four years under the famous mridangam player Mavelikkara Velukkutty Nair, he became a disciple of Palghat Mani Iyer under the Gurukula system of education with a scholarship from the Government of India, Ministry of Culture. It was his guru Mani Iyer who gave him the name Trivandrum V. Surendran.

In 1970, he became a teacher at the Swathi Thirunal Music College, where he studied. In 1974, at the age of 28, he joined Kozhikode Akashvani as a staff artist in the music department and worked in Akashvani for thirty years. He has also conducted many workshops on Mridangam in India and abroad.

=== Personal life ===
Surendran lives with his wife K. Sushila in Edappazhanji Vivekananda Nagar Dhwani. Of the two sons, Sandeep is an expert in mridangam and Shankar in violin.

== Musical career ==
He is one of the exponents of Thanjavur Bani style in mridangam.

In 1981, Surendran was appointed to the Thiruvananthapuram Akashvani, where he had the opportunity to play Mritangam with many prominent musicians at the Navratri Mandapam Music Festival. He has performed with many noted instrumentalists such as Chembai, K. V. Narayanaswamy, S. Balachander, K. S. Narayanaswamy.

== Awards and honours ==
Surendran received many awards including Kerala Sangeetha Nataka Akademi Award, Madras Music Academy Award, Navarasa Sangeetha Sabha Award, Sangeetha Bharata Puraskaram, Mridanga Vadyaratnam Award and Madurai Sangeetha Sabha's Layavadyavisharad honour. He received Sree Guruvayurappan Chembai Puraskaram in November 2022. In 2019 he received the Sangeet Natak Akademi Award for Carnatic instrumental-mridangam and Kerala Sangeetha Nataka Akademi Fellowship.
