= Chennithala Chellappan Pillai =

Indian Kathakali exponent (1924-1998)

- Born: 1 June 1924; Chennithala, Travancore, British Raj
- Died: 31 October 1998 (aged 74); Chennithala, Alappuzha district, Kerala, India
- Occupation: Kathakali exponent
- Parents: Krishna Panicker (father); Parvathy Amma (mother)
- Awards: Sangeet Natak Akademi Award (1991); Kerala Kalamandalam Award (1996)

Chennithala Chellappan Pillai was an Indian Kathakali artist from Kerala. He received the Sangeet Natak Akademi Award from the Government of India in 1991 and the Kerala Kalamandalam Award in 1996.

== Biography ==
Chennithala Chellappan Pillai was born on 1 June 1924 in Chennithala, a village in present-day Alappuzha district of Kerala, India to Krishna Panicker and Parvathy Amma. He began his Kathakali training under his grandfather Chennithala Kochu Pillai Panicker and later received advanced training from Chengannur Raman Pillai from 1946. Pillai made his debut at the age of 15 by portraying Krishna in the 'Rugmini Swayamvaram' Kathakali at the Thripperumthura Mahadevar Temple.

Pillai died on 31 October 1998.

== Career ==
In Kathakali, Pillai was a follower of the Southern School of Kathakali, also known as the Kaplingatt Kathakali style. Pillai performed various character genres, Pacha roles such as Rugmangada, Arjunan and Hamsa in 'Nalacharitha', and Kathi, Kari, and Minukku characters including Mantravadi in 'Nizhalkuthu' and Kacha. During his career, he performed at various venues in India and internationally, touring with the FACT (Fertilisers and Chemicals Travancore) Kathakali group to London, Germany, France, England and Czechoslovakia.

== Awards and honors ==
For his contributions to Kathakali, Chennithala Chellappan Pillai was awarded the Sangeet Natak Akademi Award from the Government of India in 1991 and the Kerala Kalamandalam Award in 1996.

== Legacy ==
In his memory, the Chennithala Chellappan Pillai Smaraka Kala Samsakriya Samiti, a cultural organisation dedicated to preserving and promoting the art forms of Kerala through training and various cultural programmes, was established in 2002.

The Chennithala Chellappan Pillai Smaraka Kala Samskarika Samithy conducts an annual memorial programme and presents the Chennithala Chellappan Pillai Memorial Award to Kathakali artists. The award includes Rs 10,001, a plaque and a golden shawl. Notable recipients include Thonnakkal Peethambaran (2012), Varanasi Vishnu Namboothiri, and Madavoor Vasudevan Nair. The 2022 awards were given to Mankulam Krishnan Namboothiri, Kalamandalam Surendran, and Kottarakkara Ganga. In 2024, 23-rd award was given to Chathannur Narayana Pillai. The 2025 award went to Kathakali maddalam player Thiruvalla Radhakrishnan.

In 2025, Kathakali Aswadaka Sangham (KAS), Mavelikara awarded Chennithala Chellappan Pillai Birth Centenary Award to Kathakali artist FACT Mohanan.
