= Chemancheri Kunhiraman Nair =

Indian actor (1916–2021)

Padma Shri Chemancheri Kunhiraman Nair
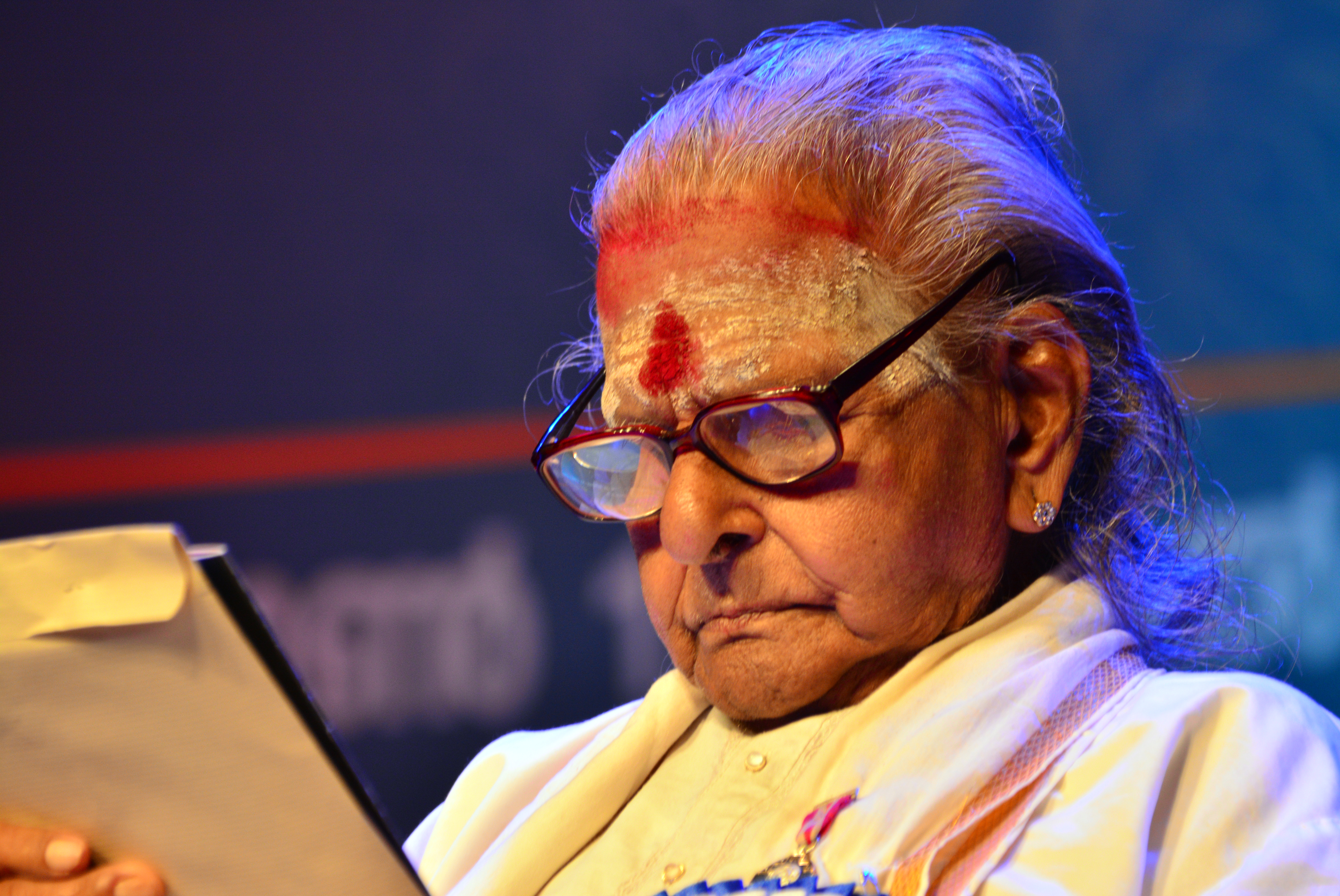
- Chemancheri Kunhiraman Nair at an event
- Born: 26 June 1916; Cheliya, Malabar District, Madras Presidency, British India (present-day Kozhikode district, Kerala, India)
- Died: 15 March 2021 (aged 104); Cheliya, Kozhikode district, Kerala, India
- Years active: 1945–2021
- Known for: Kathakali performer and teacher

Chemancheri Kunhiraman Nair, also known as Guru Chemancheri (26 June 1916 – 15 March 2021) was an Indian Kathakali actor. He spent over eighty years learning and teaching and performing Kathakali, a major form of classical Indian dance. The Government of India awarded him the fourth highest civilian honour, Padma Shri in 2017.

== Personal life ==
Kunhiraman Nair was raised in the village of Cheliya, near Koyilandy, Kozhikode district. His mother died when he was only three years old, and then, at the age of thirteen, he lost his father. He had an early interest in the performances presented by visiting drama troupes, and at the age of fifteen, left his home to begin training at a Kathikali centre, some 25 km away.

Later, he came to live in Kannur, and at the age of 31, he met his life partner, Janaki. After six years of marriage, the couple lost their first-born child, a girl. Janaki died a year later, leaving Nair to raise their one-year-old son.

== Education ==
Nair received Kathakali training under Gurus (teachers/mentors) Karunakara Menon, Ambu Panicker, Katathanad Ramunni Nair and Matasseri Kochugovindan Nair. He studied Bharatanatyam under Kalamandalam Madhavan Nair, Salem Rajaratnam Pillai and Balachandra Bhai of Madras. Within the art of Kathakali, he was attracted to the Kallatikkotan of the Kaplingatan sampradayam and came to specialise in it.

== Career and teaching ==
After many years as a performer, Nair eventually became a teacher of Kathakali. Nonetheless, he continued as a stage performer for selected roles including the Srikrishna Vesham in Santhanagopalam and several dance-dramas seen in India. He also choreographed various dance-dramas. He said that the role of Krishna is his favorite.

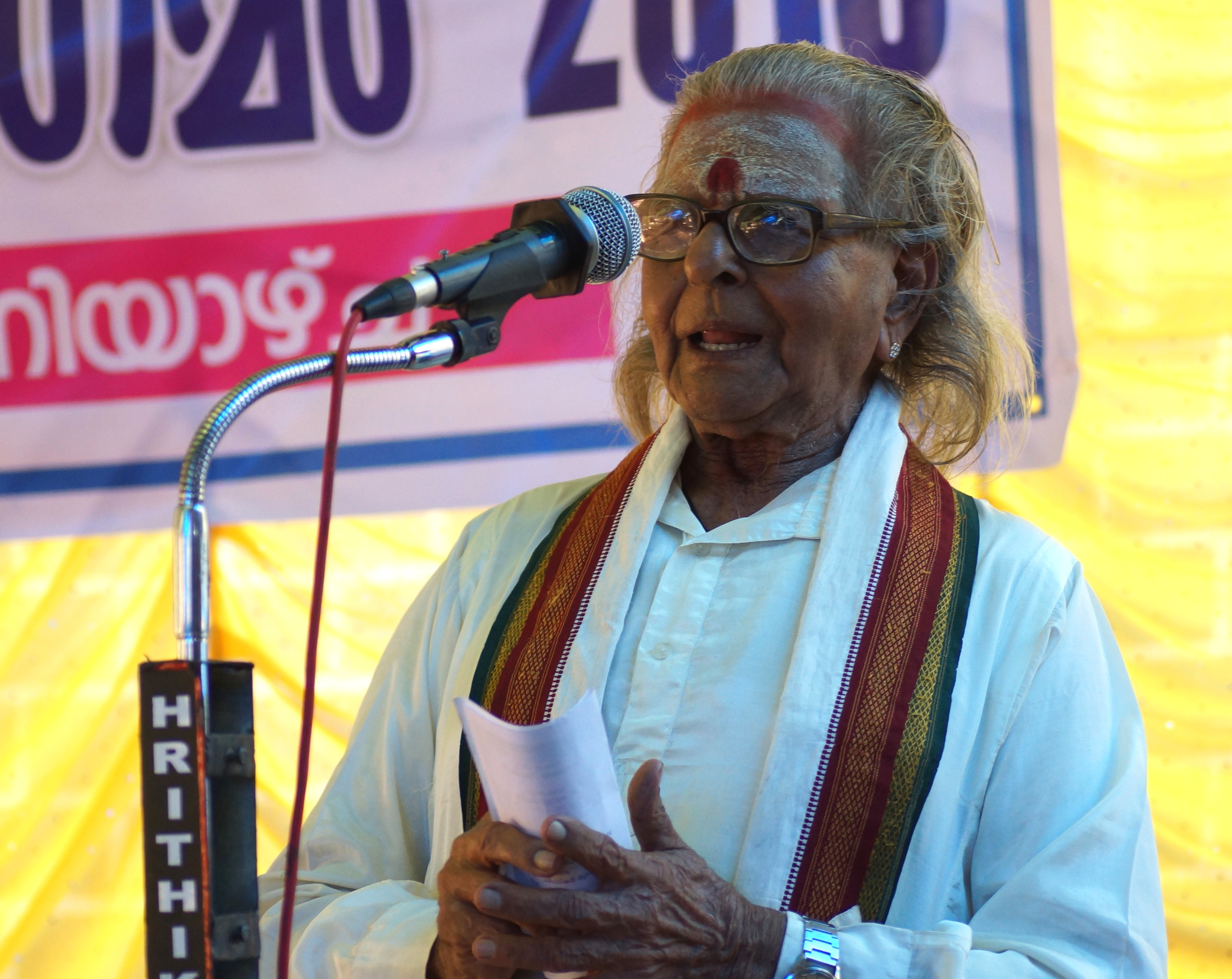
Guru Chemancheri Kunhiraman Nair

He established an institution named Bharateeya Natya Kalalayam at Kannur in 1945. Beginning in 1947, he served as Principal of the Bharatheeya Natya Kalalayam at Tellicherry.

Later, he established another school, Cheliya Kathakali Vidyalayam, in 1983, in Cheliya.

In addition to Kathakali, he also supported other dance-drama forms, including Ashtapadi Attam, based on the verses of Gitagovindam, by the medieval poet Jayadeva. Nair, in collaboration with another dance master, Guru Gopinath, formulated Kerala Natanam, which is based on Kathakali and Mohiniyattam, and became a government-recognised dance form in Kerala.

During the celebrations for his 100th birthday, actor and dancer Vineeth, performed a classical dance as a tribute to Nair, in the name of ‘Krishnaparvam’.

== Death ==
Nair died on 15 March 2021 at his residence at Cheliya village near Koyilandy at the age of 104.

== Awards and honours ==
- 1979 Kerala Sangeetha Nataka Akademi Award recognised him for his contributions.
- 1999 Kerala Sangeetha Nataka Akademi Fellowship of the Academy
- 2001 Kerala Kalamandalam granted an award for special contributions to art.
- 2002 Darpanam Natyakulapathi award
- 2002 Kerala Kalamandalam Visishta Kala Seva Award
- 2009 Kalaratnam Award of Kerala Kalamandalam
- 2017 Padma Shri awarded by the Government of India
- Mayilpeeli award
- Sangeet Natak Akademi Tagore Award for contributions to Kathakali
