= Kerala Sangeetha Nataka Akademi Fellowship =

Fellowship in arts

- Location: Thrissur, Kerala
- Country: India
- Presented by: Kerala Sangeetha Nataka Akademi (KSNA)
- Reward: ₹25,000
- First award: 1972
- Final award: 2022
- Website: Official website

The Kerala Sangeetha Nataka Akademi Fellowship is an honour presented by the Kerala Sangeetha Nataka Akademi, an autonomous organisation for the encouragement, preservation, and documentation of the performing arts of Kerala. The fellowship was set up by the Department of Cultural Affairs of the Government of Kerala in 1972. The fellowships are given to outstanding artistes who have contributed to the performing arts in the state. The awardees are decided after a general body meeting conducted by the Akademi panel members and are presented by the Governor of Kerala.

From 2012, the fellows are known by the title "Kalarathna", which is also applied to the previous winners. The recipients will receive a statuette, a citation, and cash prize. The reward comprised ₹15,000 until 2012, it was raised to ₹25,000 from the next year onward.

== List of fellows ==
List of Kerala Sangeetha Nataka Akademi Fellows, showing the year, and field(s)
Year	Image	Recipient	Field(s)	Ref.
1972	–	Chembai Vaidyanatha Bhagavatar	Classical Music	
1972	–	Manku Thampuran	Classical Music	
1972	–	Guru Gopinath	Dance	
1975		Mani Madhava Chakyar	Koothu–Koodiyattam	
1975	–	Kainikkara Kumara Pillai	Drama	
1975		Chenganoor Raman Pillai	Kathakali	
1977	–	Kalamandalam Krishnan Nair	Kathakali	
1977	–	Premji	Drama	
1979		K. J. Yesudas	Classical Music	
1979	–	M. R. Sivaraman Nair	Classical Music	
1979	–	Palghat R. Raghu	Classical Music	
1980		G. Devarajan	Classical Music	
1980	–	Mavelikara Krishnankutty Nair	Classical Music	
1980	–	Swamimalai K. Rajarathnam Pillai	Dance	
1980		V. Sambasivan	Kathaprasangam	
1981	–	Thoppil Bhasi	Drama	
1981	–	Pallassana Padmanabhan Marar	Keraleeya Vadyangal	
1981	–	Kedamangalam Sadanandan	Kathaprasangam	
1981		K. Raghavan	Light Music	
1982		V. Dakshinamoorthy	Classical Music	
1982	–	K. T. Muhammed	Drama	
1982	–	Thikkurissy Sukumaran Nair	Drama	
1982	–	T. N. Gopinathan Nair	Drama	
1982	–	Champakulam Pachu Pillai	Kathakali	
1983	–	Poomully Raman Namboothiripad	Classical Music	
1983	–	Thikkodiyan	Drama	
1983	–	Kalamandalam Madhavan	Dance	
1983	–	Kottakkal Kuttan Marar	Kathakali	
1983	–	M. P. Manmadhan	Kathaprasangam	
1985	–	Ananda Shivaram	Dance	
1985	–	Joseph Kaimaparamban	Kathaprasangam	
1986	–	Kalamandalam Krishnankutty Poduval	Kathakali	
1986		G. Sankara Pillai	Drama	
1987	–	Chalakudy N. S. Narayanaswamy	Classical Music	
1987		Kalaikkal Kumaran	Drama	
1988		Mrinalini Sarabhai	Dance	
1988	–	Eddy Master	Drama	
1989	–	T. K. Murthy	Classical Music	
1989	–	Neyyattinkara Vasudevan	Classical Music	
1990		Leela Omchery	Classical Music	
1990		Ammannur Madhava Chakyar	Koothu–Koodiyattam	
1991	–	K. S. Narayanaswamy	Classical Music	
1991	–	Jagathy N. K. Achary	Drama	
1992	–	Kalamandalam Kalyanikutty Amma	Dance	
1992		N. N. Pillai	Drama	
1993	–	V. T. Aravindaksha Menon	Drama	
1993	–	Mavelikkara Ponnamma	Drama	
1993	–	N. Krishnamoorthi	Drama	
1994	–	C. S. Krishna Iyer	Classical Music	
1994	–	V. P. Dhananjayan	Dance	
1994	–	Bharat Gopy	Drama	
1995	–	S. L. Puram Sadanandan	Drama	
1996		O. Madhavan	Drama	
1996	–	Keezhpadam Kumaran Nair	Kathakali	
1997	–	Guruvayur S. Srikrishnan	Classical Music	
1997	–	K. P. A. C. Sulochana	Drama	
1998		Mavelikkara Velukkutty Nair	Classical Music	
1998	–	P. K. Venukuttan Nair	Drama	
1999	–	Mavelikkara S. R. Raju	Classical Music	
1999	–	Kunjandi	Drama	
1999		Chemancheri Kunhiraman Nair	Kathakali	
2000		Thiruvizha Jayashankar	Classical Music	
2000		Kavalam Narayana Panicker	Drama	
2000	–	Thevarthottam Sukumaran	Kathaprasangam	
2001		B. Sasikumar	Classical Music	
2001	–	Nellai Krishnamurthy	Classical Music	
2001	–	Mavelikkara Sankarankutty Nair	Classical Music	
2002		Parassala B. Ponnammal	Classical Music	
2002	–	S. Ramanujam	Drama	
2002	–	Kalamandalam Sankaran Embranthiri	Kathakali	
2003	–	K. P. Udayabhanu	Classical Music	
2003	–	Santha Devi	Drama	
2003	–	Kavungal Chathunni Panicker	Kathakali	
2004	–	M. G. Radhakrishnan	Classical Music	
2004	–	Kalamandalam Sumathi	Dance	
2004	–	Pappukutty Bhagavathar	Drama	
2005	–	Santha P. Nair	Classical Music	
2005	–	Ennakkad Narayanankutty	Dance	
2005		Vijayakumari	Drama	
2006		T. V. Gopalakrishnan	Classical Music	
2006	–	K. P. A. C. Khan	Drama	
2006		Kalamandalam Gopi	Kathakali	
2007	–	M. S. Gopalakrishnan	Classical Music	
2007	–	Kalamandalam Satyabhama	Dance	
2007		Thilakan	Drama	
2008		M. K. Arjunan	Classical Music	
2008	–	Kottakkal Sivaraman	Kathakali	
2008	–	Kadaikodu Viswambharan	Kathaprasangam	
2009	–	Pala C. K. Ramachandran	Classical Music	
2009	–	T. K. John	Drama	
2009		Peruvanam Kuttan Marar	Keraleeya Vadyangal	
2010	–	Palkulangara Ambika Devi	Classical Music	
2010	–	Vayala Vasudevan Pillai	Drama	
2010	–	Annamanada Parameswara Marar	Keraleeya Vadyangal	
2011	–	Ananthalakshmi Venkitaraman	Classical Music	
2011	–	Kalamandalam Sugandhi	Dance	
2011	–	Artist Sujathan	Drama	
2012	–	K. Omanakutty	Classical Music	
2012	–	N. V. Krishnan Payyannur	Dance	
2012	–	C. L. Jose	Drama	
2013	–	Mangad K. Natesan	Classical Music	
2013	–	Shobana	Dance	
2013	–	Nelson Fernandez	Drama	
2014	–	M. Subramania Sharma	Classical Music	
2014	–	Kalamandalam Vimala Menon	Dance	
2014		K. P. A. C. Lalitha	Drama	
2015	–	Rugmini Gopalakrishnan	Classical Music	
2015		Kalamandalam Kshemavathy	Dance	
2015	–	K. M. Dharman	Drama	
2016	–	P. R. Kumara Keralavarma	Classical Music	
2016	–	Nirmala Panicker	Dance	
2016	–	G. Kumara Varma	Drama	
2017		Perumbavoor G. Raveendranath	Classical Music	
2017	–	K. M. Raghavan Nambiar	Drama	
2017		Gopinath Muthukad	Magic	
2018	–	Maradu Joseph	Drama	
2018		Nelliyode Vasudevan Namboodiri	Kathakali	
2018		C. S. Radhadevi	Prakshepana Kala	
2019	–	Trivandrum V. Surendran	Classical Music	
2019	–	KPAC Beatrice	Drama	
2019	–	Sadanam Vasudevan	Keraleeya Vadyangal	
2020	–	Tripunithura N. Radhakrishnan	Classical Music	
2020		Pirappancode Murali	Drama	
2020		Kalamandalam Vasu Pisharody	Kathakali	
2021	–	Mavelikkara P. Subramaniam	Classical Music	
2021		Karivellur Murali	Drama	
2021	–	V. Harshakumar	Kathaprasangam	
2022	–	Gopinath Kozhikode	Drama	
2022		Vidyadharan	Music	
2022	–	Panjal Unnikrishnan	Keraleeya Vadyangal	
2023	–	Prof Parassala Ravi	Mridangam	
2023	–	T. M. Abraham	Drama	
2023	–	Kala Vijayan	Mohiniyattam	
2024	–	A. Ananthapadmanabhan	Veena	
2024	–	Xavier Pulppatt	Playwright	
2024	–	Kalamandalam Saraswathi	Dance	
2025		G. Venu	Koodiyattom	
2025		Kaithapram Damodaran Namboothiri	Music	
2025	–	Jayaprakash Kuloor	Playwright	

== See also ==
- Sangeet Natak Akademi Fellowship
