= Mavelikkara Velukkutty Nair =

Indian mridangam player (1937 - 2012)

Mavelikkara Velukutty Nair
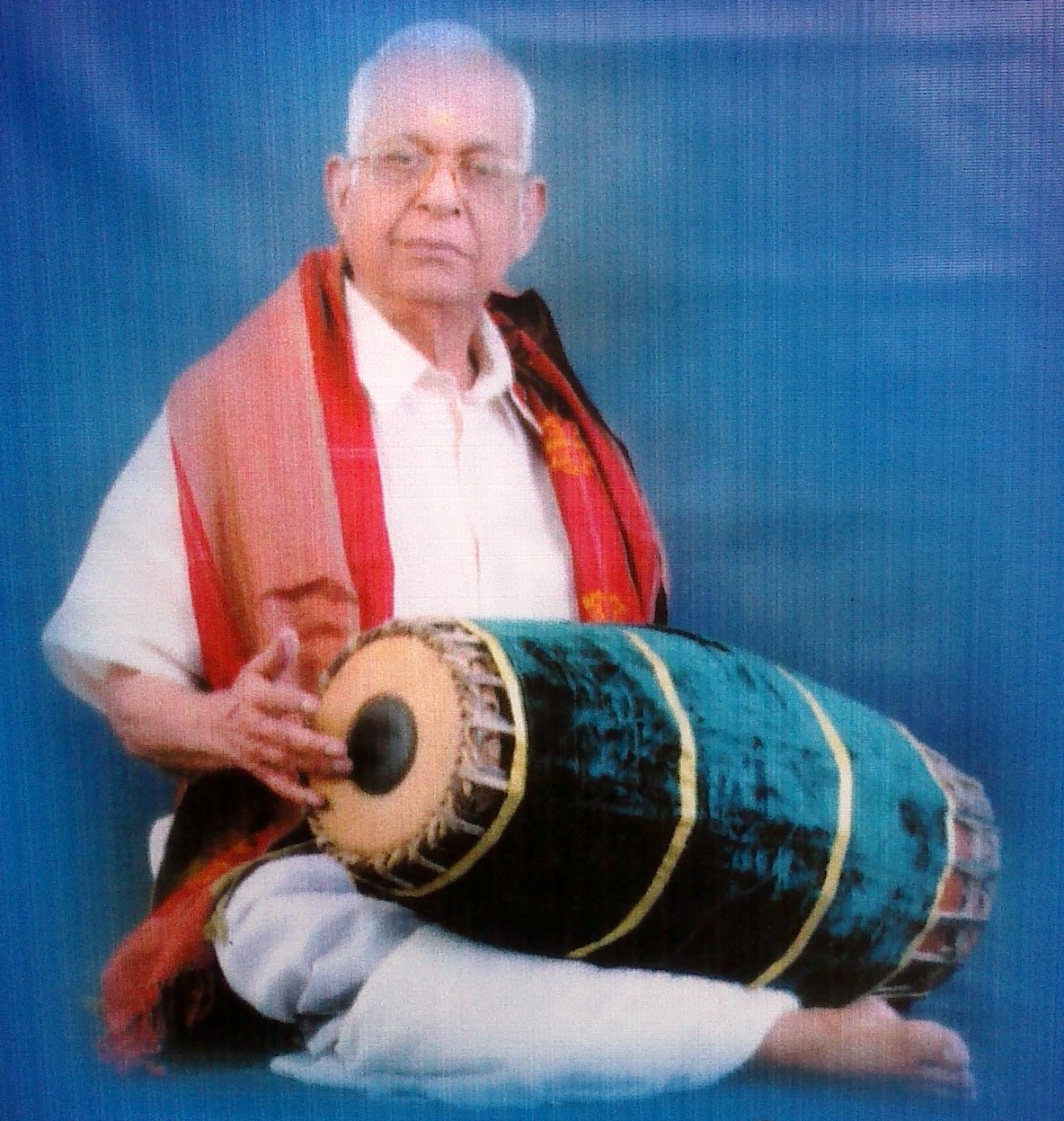

Background information
- Born: 2 October 1926; Chettikulangara (near Mavelikkara), Travancore
- Died: 24 July 2012 (aged 86) Trivandrum, Kerala, India
- Occupation: Academic
- Instrument: Mridangam
- Years active: 1937–2012

Mavelikkara Velukutty Nair (Malayalam: മാവേലിക്കര വേലുക്കുട്ടി നായർ) was an Indian mridangam player.

== Life ==
Mavelikkara Velukkutty Nair was born on 2 October 1926 in Chettikulangara (near Mavelikkara), Alleppey district, Kerala then in Travancore. He received preliminary lessons in mridangam from the famous Mridanga Vidwan Muthukulam S. Kumara Pillai. Later he received advanced training from Maestro Sangeetha Kalanidhi Padmabhooshan Palghat Mani Iyer under Gurukula system for a period of 8 years. Late Palghat R. Raghu and Umayalpuram K. Sivaraman were also disciples of Palghat Mani Iyer along with him.

== Awards and recognitions ==
- A Top graded artist (highest award) in All India Radio and Doordarshan.
- Sangeetha Kalaacharya title from Madras Music Academy in 2008.
- Central Sangeet Natak Akademi "Tagore Samman" in 2012.
- Golden Jubilee Award from Dr. Semmangudi Srinivasa Iyer foundation, Chennai in 2002.
- Kerala Sangeetha Nataka Akademi Award in 1981.
- Kerala Sangeetha Nataka Akademi Fellowship in 1998.
- Gayaka Ratna title from Sri. Swathi Thirunal Sangeet Sabha, Trivandrum in 2000.
- Mridanga Kalashiromani title from Palghat Mani Iyer Foundation, Bangalore in 2007.
- Ganalaya Visharath title from Travancore Devaswam Board in 1994.
- Guruvayoorappan Chembai Award from Guruvayoor Devaswam in 2008.
- Layavadya Ratna title from Sathguru Sangeetha Sabha, Trichi in 2009.
- Layavadya Praveena title from Kerala fine arts society, Ernakulam in 1998.
- Tansen Sangeetha Kalanidhi title from Tansen Sur Sangom, Trivandrum in 1995.
- Mridanga Ratnam title from Raja Rajeshwari Kalakshethram, Guruvayoor in 1994.
- Golden Jubilee Award from Sri. Swathi Thirunal Sangeet Sabha in 1992.
- Thulaseevanam award by Thulaseevanam Trust, Trivandrum in 1996.
- Annual Award from Guruvayoor Dorai Trust, Chennai in 2008.
- Kottaram Sankunni Nair Award from Harmoniom Chakravarthy Kottaram Sankunni Nair Memorial Trust, Changanassery in 2001.
- Sangeetha Ratna title from Sri. Nataraja Sangeetha Sabha, Varkala in 2008.
- Pranavasree Puraskar from Pranavam Sangeet Sabha, Kollam in 2006.
- Sangeetha Sampoorna title from Poornathrayesa Sangeet Sabha, Thripunithura.
- Vadya Kulapathi title from Kaladarppanam, Aluva in 2002.
- Sangeetha Ratna title from Adi Sankara Veda Vedanta Samskritha Co-operative Society, Trivandrum.
- Prathibha Pranamam by Manaveeyam, Government of Kerala.
- Cultural Award from Padmasree Krishnankutty Nair Memorial Trust in 2004.
- Mridanga Kalanidhi title from Nair Service Society, Muscat Chapter.
- Annual Award from Sree Raja Rajeswari Sangeetha Sabha, Alleppey in 1998.
- Award from Puthukkotta Dakshinamoorthy Pillai Memorial Trust, Trichi.
