= Panjal, Thrissur =

Panjal
- Village
- Location in Kerala, India Panjal (India)
- Coordinates: 10.7215°N 76.3055°E
- Country: India
- State: Kerala
- District: Thrissur

Government
  - Type: Panchayat
  - Body: Gram panchayat

Population (2011)
  - Total: 6,388

Languages
  - Official: Malayalam, English
- Time zone: UTC+5:30 (IST)
- PIN: 679531
- Telephone code: 04884
- Vehicle registration: KL-
- Lok Sabha constituency: Alathur
- Vidhan Sabha constituency: Chelakkara

Panjal (IAST: pāññāḷ) is a village near Chelakkara, Thrissur district in the state of Kerala, India. The village is known for the Athirathram yāgam, held in 1975 and 2011. The yāgam is one of the oldest rituals of mankind in existence, and the ritual has only been maintained by small communities in India.

== Demographics ==
Panjal is Famous for the Athirathram which was held in the year 1975. Panjal is situated near the bank of Nila (Bharathapuzha). As of 2011 India census Panjal had a population of 6388 with 3104 males and 3284 females. Panjal village is full of greenery and scenery. Many ancient Kerala-style temples such as Lakshmi Narayana temple, Ayyappan Kavu, Kaattil Kavu Siva temple, Mathur Vettekkaran temple, Nellikkattil Ganapathy temple, Machil Bhagavathy, Mullakkal Bhagavathy, Thekkummuri Subramanian Kovil, Padinjattumuri Subramanian Kovil, Mariamman Kovil, Palunkil temple, etc. are in this village.

== Festivals ==
Ayyappan Kavu Uthram Vela and Padinjattumuri Subramanyan Kovil Thaipooyam are major festivals celebrated in the village. The Uthram Vela festival features 5 to 15 elephants and concludes with fireworks (vedikettu). The Thaipooyam festival includes performances by Kavadi dancers, prominent nadaswaram ensembles, and traditional chena melam drumming groups at the temple premises.

The temple, which previously lacked formal management, is currently maintained by local youth and residents. Recent developments include the construction of a marriage hall (kalayanamandapam) and a dining hall (annadaana mandapam), alongside other ongoing projects.

Additionally, the Thottathil Mana Vettekkaran temple hosts the annual Maha Kiratha Rudra Yajnam, typically held in April or May. This event spans several days and includes the Bhagavatha Sapthaha Yajnam, Shatha Chandikayagam, panjavadyam, thayambaka, kalampaattu, and the traditional pantheerayiram (breaking of 12,000 coconuts). The program is organized by the Vettekkaran Seva Samithi under the guidance of Thottahil Mana Kuttan Namboothiri. In 2013, the Sivakiratham Global Trust coordinated an Athirathram ritual to mark the tenth anniversary of the Yajnam.

== Expatriates ==
From this village many people are working in various cities of India such Salem, Coimbatore, Madurai, Bangalore, Chennai, Mumbai, Calcutta, Delhi and many people are working in Gulf countries and European countries. People of this village are highly educated and rich in culture. The famous Vazhelikkavu Bhagavathy temple is situated in this village and the ayyappan kavu temple and kaattil kave temple premises has been a part of many of the famous Malayalam films such as Kuttiedathy, Oridathu, Devasuram, Balettan, and Pasupathi.

== Film shooting ==
The beauty of this village has led to many cinema shootings taking place here, including the Tamil film Muthu and several Malayalam films such as Godha.

The world-famous Kerala Kalamandalam is at Cheruthuruthy, which is near this village. The main films are Balettan, Akasthile Paravakal, Madampi, Malarvadi Arts Club, Ee Puzhayum Kadannu, and Peruvannapurathe Visheshangal.

== Notable persons ==
Malayalam playwright Thuppettan was born in Panjal. Playback singer Srikumar who sang the song "Anuraga Vilochananayi" in the film Neelathamara also belongs to this village.

== Schools ==
This village has one higher secondary school "Government Higher Secondary School, Panjal", two UP schools 1, "GUPS Painkulam" 2, gups Killimangalam and one Engineering college, "Jyothi Engineering College".
