= Madavoor Vasudevan Nair =

Indian dancer

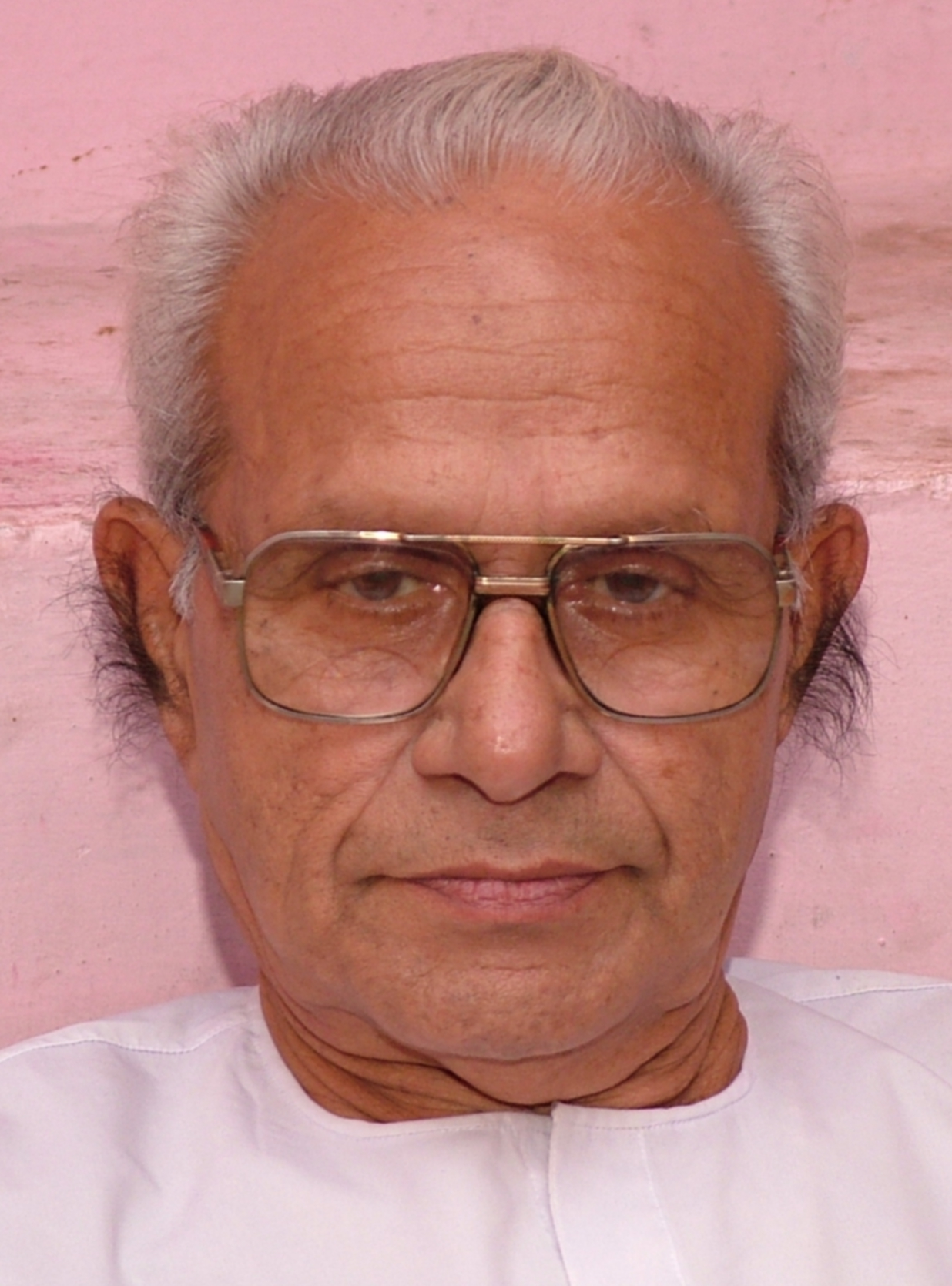
- Born: Madavoor Vasudevan Nair old Kollam, Travancore
- Died: Kollam, Kerala
- Parent(s): Rama Kurup (father); KalyanikuttyAmma (mother)

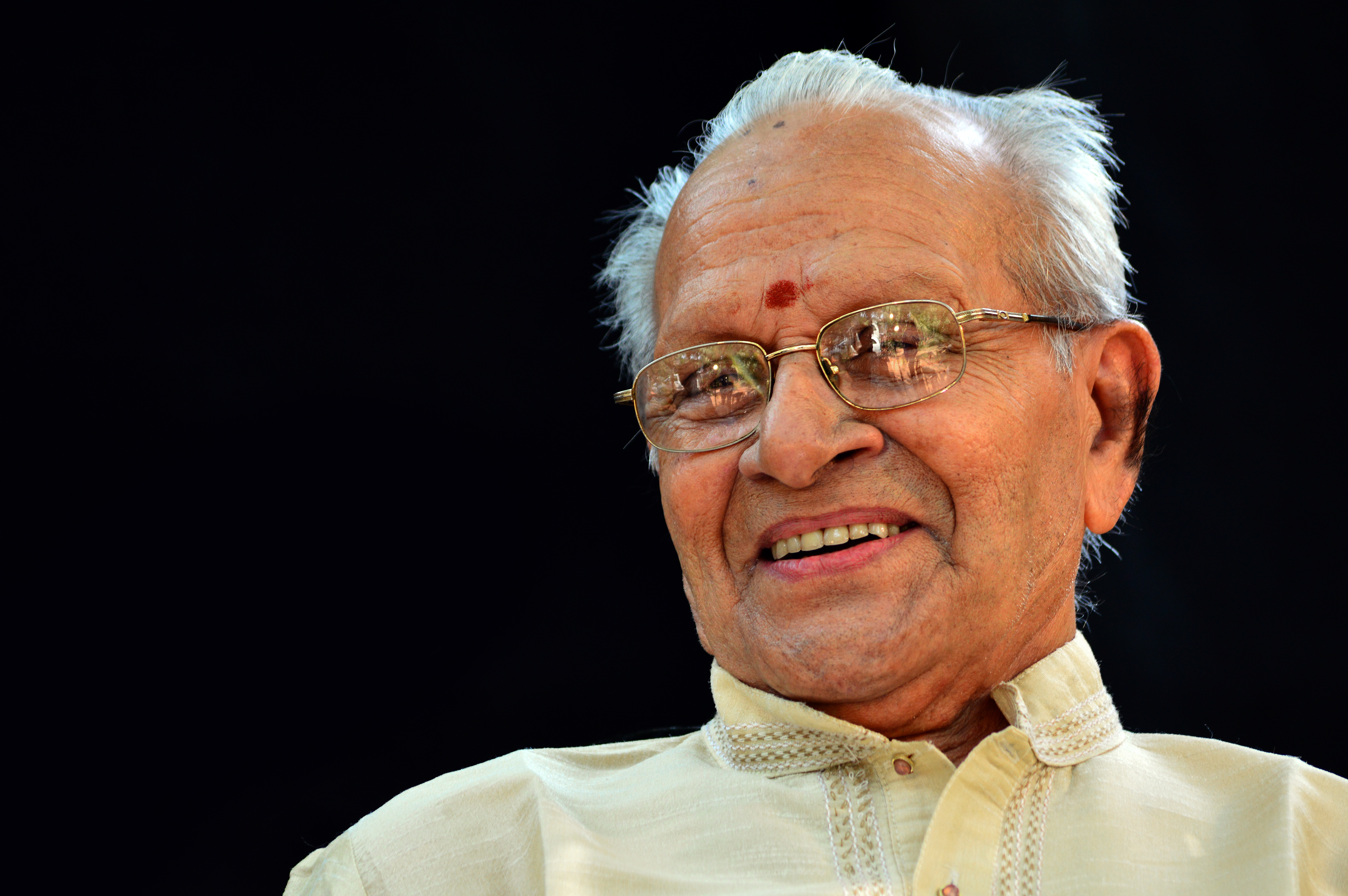
Madavoor Vasudevan Nair

Madavoor Vasudevan Nair (7 April 1929 Alattukavu, Vallikeezhu, Kollam, (Kerala) – 6 February 2018) was a veteran Kathakali artiste.

== Biography ==
He was awarded the Padma Bhushan by the Government of India in 2011. He taught the Kaplingadan style of Kathakali performance and was also one of the last practitioners of the south Kerala style (Kaplingadan) school of the classical dance-drama. He died during a stage performance at Agasthyakode Mahadeva Temple in Anchal, Kollam district, on 6 February 2018, aged 88.
