= Mavelikara Krishnankutty Nair =

Mridangam player

Mavelikara Krishnan Kutty Nair
- Born: Mavelikara, Kerala, India
- Occupation: Mridangam player

Mavelikkara Krishnankutty Nair (11 October 1920 – 13 January 1988) was a Carnatic Mridangam player. He received his training from Alleppey Venkappan Pillai and Veechur Krishna Iyer. He considered Palani Subramaniam Pillai as his 'Manasa Guru'. He received the Padma Shri from the President of India. He received the Kerala Sangeetha Nataka Akademi Award in 1971 and the Kerala Sangeetha Nataka Akademi Fellowship in 1980. Krishnankutty Nair was also an artiste for All India Radio in Trivandrum.
