= Kerala Sangeetha Nataka Akademi =

Building in Thrissur, India

Coordinates: 10°31′57.86″N 76°13′7.1″E

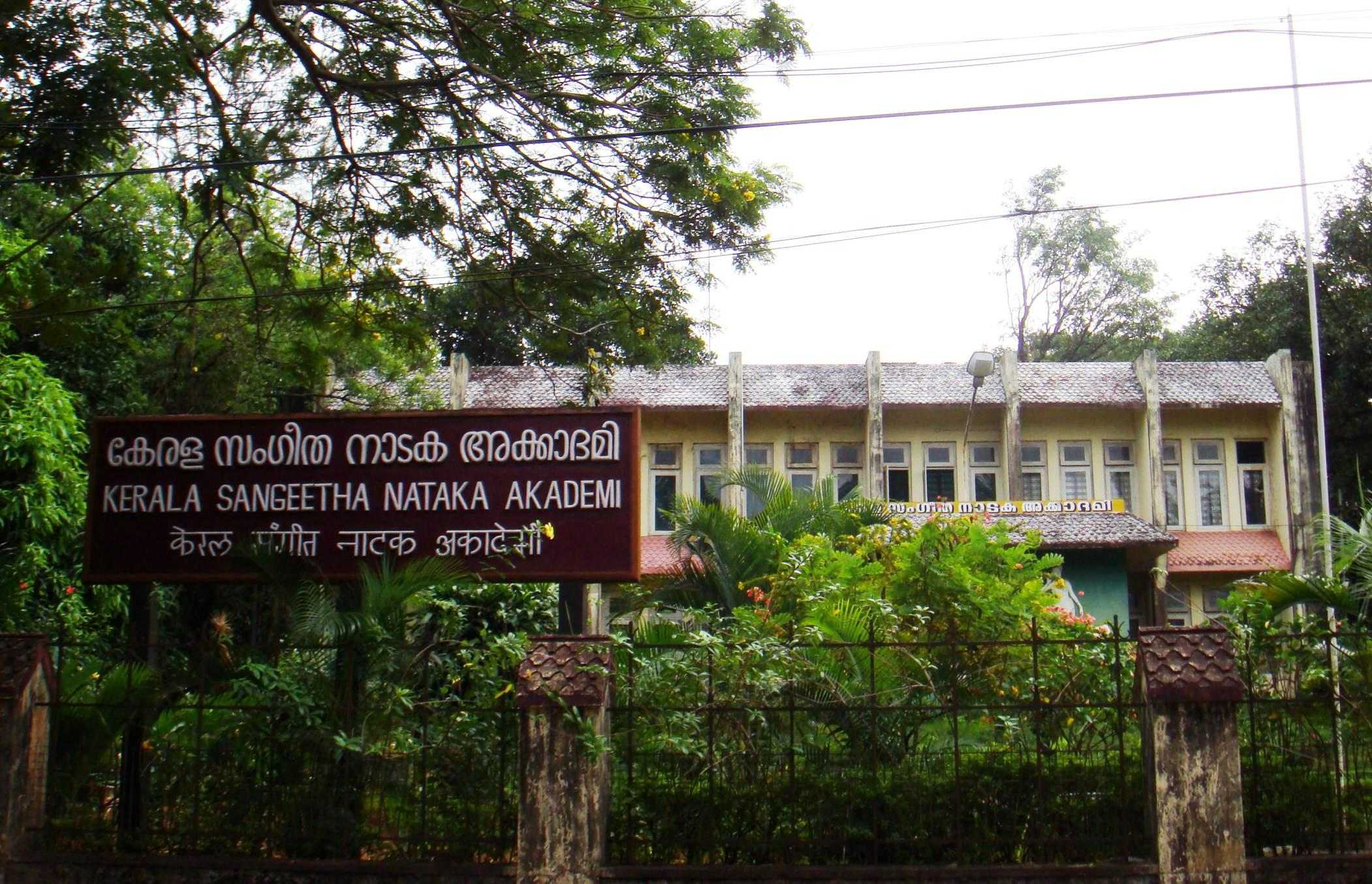
- Front-view of Kerala Sangeetha Nataka Akademi in Thrissur
- Abbreviation: KSNA
- Formation: 26 April 1958; 68 years ago
- Headquarters: Thrissur, Kerala, India
- Region served: Kerala
- Chairman: G. Venugopal (present)
- Secretary: Karivellur Murali (present)
- Parent organisation: Cultural Affairs Department, Government of Kerala
- Website: Official website

Kerala Sangeetha Nataka Akademi is located in Thrissur city, of Kerala, in India.

The academy presents awards in various fields like music, dance, theatre and traditional art forms. Some of the major awards include:

- Kerala Sangeetha Nataka Akademi Fellowship
- Kerala Sangeetha Nataka Akademi Award

== History ==
It was established on 26 April 1958, inaugurated by then Indian prime minister Pandit Jawaharlal Nehru. The academy started a cultural centre at the Bahrain Kerala Samajam in Bahrain on 1 October 2010.

== Image gallery ==
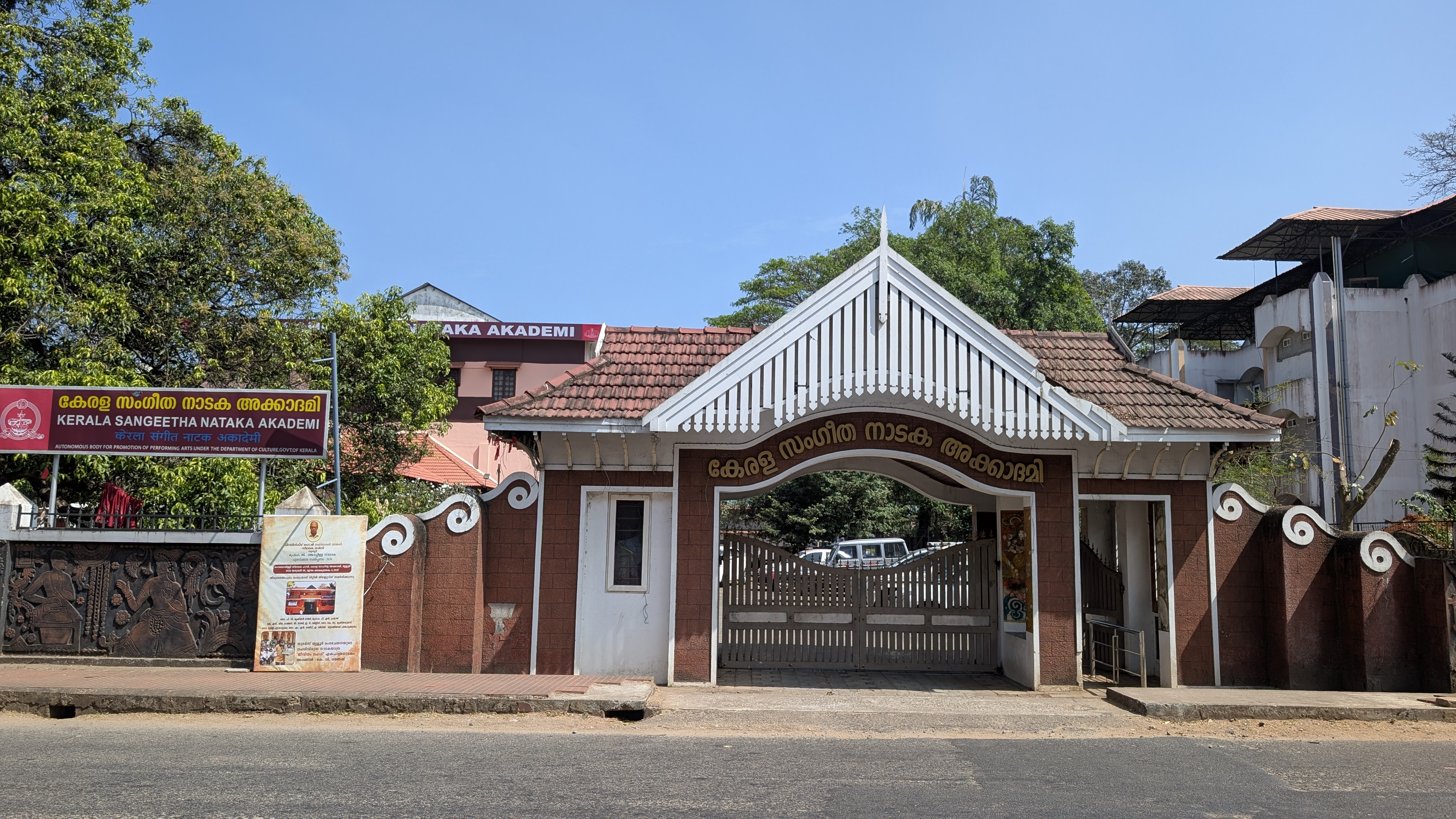
Front view in 2026

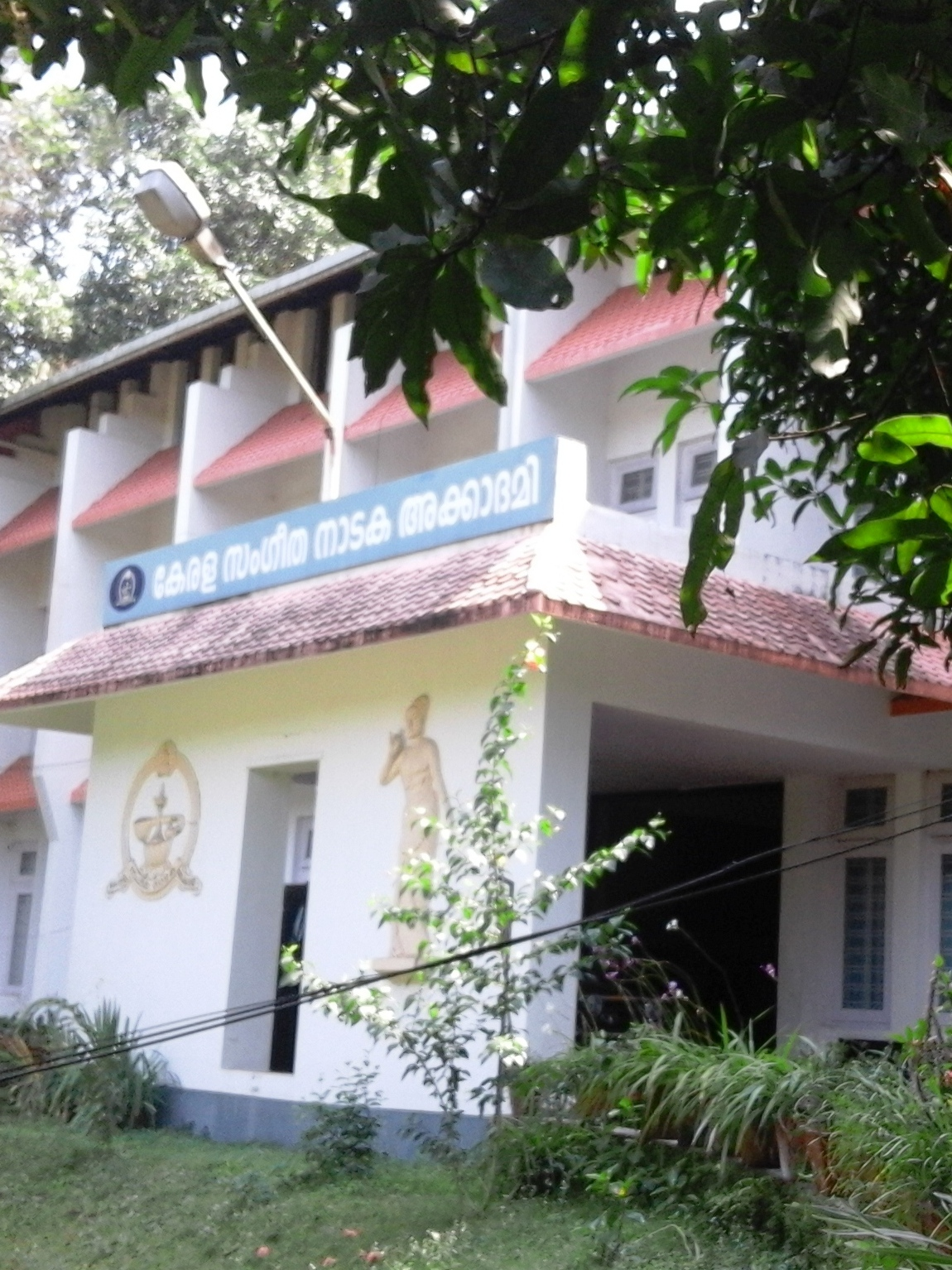
Inside the academy compound

== See also ==
- KPAC
- Kalidasa Kalakendram
