= Tharangini Records =

Indian music company

- Trade name: Tharangni
- Type: Private
- Industry: Music
- Genre: Various
- Founded: November 23, 1980; 45 years ago in Thiruvananthapuram, India
- Founder: K. J. Yesudas
- Headquarters: Chennai, Tamil Nadu, India
- Key people: K. J. Yesudas (director); Prabha Yesudas (director); Vijay Yesudas (director); Vinod Yesudas (director); Vishal Yesudas (director)
- Services: Music record label

YouTube information
- Channel: Tharangni
- Genres: Music videos; Digital audio
- Website: tharangni.com

Tharangini Records (currently Tharangni) is the music company founded by noted Indian Playback singer K. J. Yesudas in 1980 at Thiruvananthapuram, Kerala. It was the first recording and distributing music label in Kerala from where Malayalam film songs on audio cassettes came out. Other than Malayalam, Tharangni also released songs in Tamil, Telugu, Kannada, Hindi, Bengali, Marathi, English, Malay, Arabic, Russian and Latin. Tharangni release albums under various labels, Tharangni (film songs), Tharangni or Ayaan (album/devotional songs), Bharath Sangeeth (Classical songs and Hindi albums), 9th Angel Records (Christian devotional songs), Diva Records, V Records & Entertainment, Amplify More, all licensed or incorporated under Dr. K. J. Yesudass Audio and Visuals Corporation Limited and Yesudass Media Private Limited.

Tharangini cassettes popularise light music and mappila songs among the audiences. Light music albums like Vasantha Geethangal, Raaga Tharangini, Madhura Geethangal etc. which also includes festival albums like Ulsava Ganangal series, Ponnona Tharangini series and mappila songs' albums like Mylanchi Pattukal series, Jannatul Firdaus were huge popular. Shyama dharaniyil from the 1981 Malayalam movie Sanchari was the first recorded song in Tharangini studio, which was composed and sung by Yesudas. In December 1981, Tharangini released its first audio cassette, Classical Music Vol-1. The first filmi songs' audio cassette released by Tharangini was from the movie Chillu.

== History ==
Yesudas initially started the studio at Chennai in 1977 by leasing a theater of Arunachalam Studio. Ameer and V. G. Balakrishnan were the recording engineers. The company started its functioning in its first studio at Vellayambalam, Thiruvananthapuram as Tharangini Studios and Records on 23 November 1980. It also had a studio at Ernakulam. The studio had state-of-the-art Otari eight-track tape machine and a two-track mastering system from Switzerland. Recordings were done at Thiruvananthapuram studio till 2005. In 1992 the office and studio were moved to Abhiramapuram, Chennai, Tamil Nadu due to labor strike. It also started a voice mixing studio, Studio27, at Chennai. The company was incorporated at the United States in 1998.

== Profile ==
Primarily established as the first recording and distributing music label in Kerala for Malayalam films, it has in its credit number of audio albums mainly associated with K. J. Yesudas. Eugene Pereira was the first chief mixing engineer. V. G. Balakrishnan works between 1980 and 1991. A. Karunakaran was the chief mixing engineer of the studio between 1985 and 2005. Composer Alleppey Ranganath joined Tharangini as staff music director and script scrutinising officer in 1981. Satheesh Sathyan, son of actor Sathyan, was the manager of Tharangini from 1982 to 1986. Sound designer Renganaath Ravee was also worked as a sound recordist here. The cassettes (the primary medium for music before digital revolution), produced by Tharangini, containing light songs, used to be sold just as those featuring film songs in the 1980s and 90s. Tharangini paved way for the most melodious period for non-film music in Malayalam. Now it continues to produce and present events of K. J. Yesudas both for film and Indian classical music concerts throughout the world. Most of Tharangini's cassette covers features the snaps clicked by photographer R. Gopalakrishnan. Composer Mohan Sithara used to play violin and conduct orchestra at Tharangini for composers like M. G. Radhakrishnan, Shyam and V. Dakshinamoorthy.

== Releases ==
=== Festival releases ===
During 1980s and 90s, songs like Shraavana chandrika, Valamipiri shankhil, Ennum chirikkunna, Maamaankam palakuri etc. were brought out by Tharangini Records and became best-sellers. “More than 5 lakh cassettes of 'Ulsava Ganangal Vol. 1' were sold shortly after Tharangini released it in 1983,” recalls Sreekumaran Thampi, who wrote all the songs of the album. Ennum chirikkunna, from the album composed by Raveendran, remains one of the greatest light songs of all time in Malayalam. Composer Sreevalsan J. Menon used to sing it as a student. “It is an astonishing composition; it certainly is not easy to tune such a song in raga Mohanam”, he says. Uthradapoonilave vaa, another track from the album, gained huge popularity among Keralites. Soon Tharangini brought out two other winners, 'Ganolsavam' and 'Vasantha Geethangal'. 'Ganolsavam' contained Shraavana chandrika, penned by O. N. V. Kurup, composed by Jerry Amaldev and rendered by Yesudas, "is one of the finest songs in Malayalam on night and its irresistible beauty". The highlight of 'Vasantha Geethangal', written by Bichu Thirumala and composed by Raveendran, was Valampiri shankhil and "it had Yesudas at his best. It is the golden standard of singing", says Sreevalsan. Composer Sharreth recalls his memories, “Growing up in Kollam, I used to wait impatiently for the latest Onam cassette from Tharangini. Often the wait would be long, for the cassettes would be sold out in no time. I still remember the excitement with which I listened to the songs of 'Ulsava Ganangal Vol. 1' at Lakshmi Musical in Kollam”.

Tharangini was the first studio or label to release a set of songs every year for Onam. “The first album that came under the label ‘Onappattukal Vol. 1’ was released in 1981. It had songs, written by O. N. V. Kurup and composed by Alleppey Ranganath, all sung by Yesudas himself. It was an Onam gift from the maestro,” says music critic T. P. Sasthamangalam. "One of the evergreen albums from Tharangini was 'Ulsava Ganangal Vol. 1', which had Sreekumaran Thampi writing the lines for Raveendran’s music and sung by Yesudas. Uthradapoonilave vaa, Ennum chirikkunna sooryante, Paayippaattaattil vallamkali and Oru nullu kaakkapoo were immortal songs in this collection. Every year, this album of Onam songs, written and composed by great lyricists and music directors, was much awaited by music lovers. In 1986, 'Aavanippookkal’ was a record-breaking album that had lyricist Yusufali Kechery teaming up with composer M. S. Viswanathan", adds the critic. Yesudas occasionally sings the song Thulasi krishnathulasi from 'Aavanippookkal' towards the end of his classical concerts. The eleven songs written by Yusufali Kechery and composed by Vidyadharan for the album 'Raaga Tharangini' turned superhits, among which the songs Amavaasi naalil and Ninmeni nenmeni vaakapoovo become classics. Compositions by N. P. Prabhakaran for the albums 'Ponnona Tharangini Vol. 3' (1994), 'Ponnona Tharangini Vol. 4' (1995), 'Shravana Sangeetham' (1995) were also popular. In 2022 Tharangini released a single, Ponchingatheru, an Onam festival song from the studio after the album 'Kudamullappoo' (2003), which was released 19 years ago. In 2023 Sreekumaran Thampi penned another song for Tharangini after long 31 years for Ponnona Thalam, an Onam single, composed by Salgin Kalappura and sung by Yesudas and Shweta Mohan.

=== Devotional releases ===
Tharangini released devotional songs on various religious occasions each year. 'Ayyappa Songs', 'Ganga Theertham', 'Thulasi Theertham' and 'Mayilpeeli' were such albums which became biggest hits in devotional cassette sales. Tharangini's Ayyappa devotional songs were popular in south India because each albums were released in four south Indian languages, Malayalam, Tamil, Telugu and Kannada. Among them 'Ayyappa Devotional Songs Vol. 6' (1986) became huge success and popular in all languages. All the songs were penned by Chowallur Krishnankutty, composed by Gangai Amaran and sung by Yesudas were hits. Mappila songs, including folk and devotional, were confined to certain Muslim pockets in the Malabar region, but with the arrival of V. M. Kutty and his female singing partner Valsala, these songs gained popularity, especially after Yesudas sung one of his numbers Samkritha Pamagari for the album 'Mylanchi Pattukal Vol. 1'. Tharangini's Christian devotional songs are also popular which were also released in other south Indian languages. Yahoodiyayile Oru Gramathil, written and composed by A. J. Joseph and sung by Yesudas remains one of the most popular Christian devotional songs. Rakshaka ente paapabhaaramellaam, written by P. K. Gopi and composed by Tomin J. Thachankary, from the Christian devotional album 'Vachanam' gained huge popularity after it was released by Tharangini (later released under Thachankary's own label Riyan Creations).

== Tharangini artists ==
These are some of the artists that collaborated with Tharangini Records frequently, other than Yesudas:

Lyricists	Composers	Singers
O. N. V. Kurup; Sreekumaran Thampi; Alleppey Ranganath; Chowallur Krishnankutty; T. K. R. Bhadran; Bichu Thirumala; S. Ramesan Nair; Kaithapram; Poovachal Khader; Yusufali Kechery	Alleppey Ranganath; V. Dakshinamoorthy; Raveendran; Vidyadharan; T. S. Radhakrishnan; K. G. Jayan; Berny-Ignatius; Fr. Justin Panakkal; Jerry Amaldev; V. M. Kutty; Kozhikode Aboobacker; Jerson Antony	P. Susheela; S. Janaki; K. S. Chithra; Sujatha Mohan; Vilayil Faseela; S. Janakidevi; Vijay Yesudas

== Selected film albums ==
- Chillu
- Ente Mamattukkuttiyammakku
- Nakhakshathangal
- Panchagni
- Thalavattam
- Daisy
- Isabella
- Ennennum Kannettante
- Namukku Parkkan Munthirithoppukal
- Manivathoorile Aayiram Sivarathrikal
- Neeyethra Dhanya
- Nadodikkattu
- Thoovanathumbikal
- Unnikale Oru Kadha Parayam
- Dhwani
- Njan Gandharvan
- His Highness Abdullah
- Bharatham
- Pappayude Swantham Appoos
- Yoddha
- Sargam
- Ghazal

== Selected discography ==
- Ayyappa Bhakthi Gaanangal (Vol 1 – 37)
- Grameena Ganangal (Vol 1, 2)
- Ulsava Ganangal (Vol 1 - 3)
- Vishada Ganangal (Vol 1, 2)
- Mylanchi Pattukal (Vol 1 - 5)
- Sweet Melodies (Vol 1 - 5)
- Ganga Theertham (Vol 1, 2)
- Thulasi Maala (Vol 1, 2)
- Ponnona Tharangini (Vol 1 - 4)
- Rasikapriya (Vol 1, 2)
- Thalir Malyam (1979)
- Onappattukal (1981)
- Mappila Pattukal (1982)
- Children's Songs (Vol 1, 2)
- Vasantha Geethangal (1984)
- Ganolsavam (1984)
- Bhava Geethangal (1984)
- Prabhatha Geethangal (1984)
- Gaanamalika (1984)
- Parishudha Ganangal (1984)
- Ayyappa Suprabhatham (1984)
- Snehamalyam (1985)
- Amrutha Geethangal (1986)
- Aavani Pookkal (1986)
- Thulasi Theertham (1986)
- Ragatharangini (1987)
- Asarmulla (1987)
- Khalbinte Geethangal (1987)
- Vellipparavakal (1987)
- Aavani Thennal (1988)
- Aavani Pookkuda (1988)
- Snehadeepika (1989)
- Aavani Poochendu (1989)
- Sri Mookambikai Songs (1989)
- Aavani Thaalam (1991)
- Pavizhamalli (1992)
- Aardra Geethangal (1993)
- Hrudayanjali (1993)
- Mayilpeeli (1988)
- Om Gananaadham (1997)
- Anuraga Manjari (1994)
- Snehageethangal (1995)
- Pranavam (1997)
- Om Mahaganapathe (1995)
- Pradakshinam (1996)
- Vinayakam (1996)
- Shravana Sangeetham (1996)
- Aavani Ponpulari (1997)
- Lailathul Khadar (1997)
- Thiruvona Kaineettam (1998)
- Harimurali (1998)
- Astotharam (1998)
- Poothiruvonam (1999)
- Kasthoori Thilakam (2000)
- Namaarchana (2000)
- Ennum Ee Ponnonam (2001)
- Kodi Archana (2001)
- Pushpolsavam (2001)
- Sree Chakkulathamma (2000)
- Swami Suprabhatham (2001)
- Ormikkan Omanikkan (2002)
- Rudra Theertham (2002)
- Souparnika Theertham (2002)
- Kudamullappoo (2003)
- Agrepashyami (2003)
- Vande Mukundam (2003) - Collaborated with Satyam Audios
- Rithu Geethangal (2004) - Collaborated with Satyam Audios
- Geetha Pranamam (2004)
- Nadhi (2004)
- Navaganapathy (2004)
- Swargappoovu (2004)
- Kusruthi Kannan (2006)
- Neelambari (2007)
- Maaleyam (2007)
- Thirumudippeeli (2012)
- Ambalapuzhakannanu Paalpayasam (2013)
- Ammathamburatti (2013)

== See also ==
- K. J. Yesudas
- K. J. Yesudas discography
