= Chowallur Krishnankutty =

Indian lyricist (1936–2022)

- Born: Chowallur Warriath Krishnankutty; 11 July 1936; Chowallur, Kingdom of Cochin, Union of India (present-day Thrissur district, Kerala, India
- Died: 26 June 2022 (aged 85); Thrissur, Kerala, India
- Education: Sree Kerala Varma College
- Occupations: Lyricist, journalist, screenwriter, actor
- Years active: 1959–2022
- Website: chowallurkrishnankutty.com

Chowallur Krishnankutty (11 July 1936 – 26 June 2022) was an Indian lyricist, journalist, screenwriter and actor. He has penned hundreds of Malayalam devotional songs. The song Oru neramenkilum, from the Tharangini album Thulasi Theertham is the most popular of his lyrics. Krishnankutty had written screenplays and acted in several Malayalam films and also wrote the dialogues for the film Sargam. A recipient of the Kerala Sahitya Akademi Award, Krishnankutty also served as the vice-chairman of the Kerala Kalamandalam.

== Early life ==
Krishnankutty was born on 11 July 1936 to Kodungalloor Kavil Warriath Sankunny Warrier and Chowallur Warriath Parukkutty Warrasyar at his maternal home, Chowallur Warriam, near Guruvayur. Krishnankutty completed his education from Iringapuram Makkunni Memorial School, Mattom St. Francis High School and Sree Kerala Varma College.

== Career ==
Chowallur Krishnankutty began his career as a journalist in 1959 as the sub-editor at Navajeevan, a daily newspaper published from Thrissur, under Joseph Mundassery. The Guruvayur Arts Club, of which he was one of the founding members, was a pioneer in stage plays which saw accomplished artists like KPAC Lalitha join the artistic hub and perform. In the early 1960s, Chowallur did research in folk arts in Kerala with a scholarship from the Department of Higher Education. Later he submitted the work under the supervision of Dr. K. N. Pisharody, the then chairman of Kerala Kalamandalam and Kavalam Narayana Panicker, the then secretary of the Kerala Sangeetha Nataka Akademi. He then moved to Guruvayur in 1963 as the editor of Swathanthra Mandapam, the first evening daily from the town. Later he joined All India Radio, Kozhikode, working as a staff artist for two years under Uroob. When Malayala Manorama launched its unit in Kozhikode in 1966, he joined the editorial team and retired in 2004. He was also a percussionist.

Krishnankutty's first film as a screenwriter was Prabhaathasandhya, produced by Madhu and directed by P. Chandrakumar. The base story for Oru Katha Oru Nunakkatha was penned by Krishnankutty. He wrote the dialogues for the 1992 film Sargam. Thereafter he wrote scripts for Naaraayam, Chaithanyam, Sasinas and Sreeragam. He had done documentaries on Chembai Viadyanadha Bhagavathar, Kalamandalam Kalyanikutty Amma, Kalamandalam Ramankutty Nair, Kalamandalam Appukutty Pothuval, Keezhpadam Kumaran Nair, Kudamaloor Karunakaran Nair and Champakulam Pachu Pillai. He also acted in films like Maram, Nellu, Thiruvonam, Srishti, Shalini Ente Koottukari and Anyarude Bhoomi.

He entered into filmi lyricist field in 1976 by writing the song Swapnadanam njan thudarunnu for the movie Thulavarsham, composed by Salil Chowdhury. He then wrote songs for the 1981 film Kalopasana, composed by K. Raghavan, his long-time associate in Akashavani.

Krishnankutty's association with K. J. Yesudas and his Tharangini Records made some of the most popular Malayalam Hindu devotional albums including Thulasi Theertham, composed by T. S. Radhakrishnan and Ayyappa Bhakthiganangal Vol. 6, composed by Gangai Amaran, both released in 1986. He had written around 3500 devotional songs and 27 books in various genres.

Krishnankutty served as a member of Kerala Sangeetha Nataka Akademi, Kerala Sahitya Akademi and as the vice-chairman of Kerala Kalamandalam. He also served in the editorial boards of Bhakthapriya, a Guruvayur Devaswom publication, Sree Guruvayurappn Masika, published by Guruvayurappn Sankeertana Trust, Nostagia Lifestyle magazine etc.

== Accolades ==
Krishnankutty had won numerous awards and honours in his career. It includes,

- 1953 – Gold Medal for Poetry in the competition organised by Kerala Sasthra Sahithya Parishad.
- 1991 – Best Professional Drama Music Lyricist Award by the Government of Kerala for the play Agraharam.
- 2009 – Sree Nagaraja Award for Literature instituted by Pambady Sree Pambumkavu
- 2009 – Kerala Kalamandalam Mukunda Raja Memorial Award
- 2013 – Guruvandanam honour by Kerala Sahitya Akademi at Viswa Malayala Mahotsavam 2012.
- 2013 – Jnanappana Award by Guruvayur Devaswom
- 2017 – Kerala Sahitya Akademi Award for Humour for Ezuthanukaranam Anurananangalum.

== Personal life ==
Krishnankutty was married to Thrissilassery Warriath Saraswathy Warassyar and they had two children, Usha and Unnikrishnan.

== Death ==
Krishnankutty died on 26 June 2022 at Amala Institute of Medical Sciences, Thrissur.
