= Ishal =

Ishal is the melodic framework within which Mappila Songs are composed. Though identical to tala(metre (music)) and raga of Indian music, it has influences from the ancient folk songs of Kerala and Arabian musical traditions.

Ishals with its distinct tunes convey the emotion and mood of the lyrics being rendered. As mappila songs are also used in mappila performing arts like Oppana, Kolkali, Duffmuttu, etc.; the change in ishals changes the dance moves. Ishals like Kuthirabaravu / Kuthirathalam meaning 'horse rhythm' gives the audience the feel of a galloping horse, with its distinctive rhythmic rendering.

Much of the recorded sources of ishals are Mappila literary works written in Arabi-Malayalam. Moyinkutty Vaidyar's work alone has used numerous different Ishals in composition. Oral transmission is another source of information on various ishals. Researches on Ishals are still underway.

== List of known Ishals ==
- Kombu, with its various sub categories.
- Thongal
- Bambu
- Akanthar / Chayppu Virutham
- Oppana Chayal & Oppana Murukkam
- Hakkana
- Mihraaj
- Munajaat
- Kavi
- Maanitham Kwala & Maanitham Kwala Murukkam
- Aadi Antham
- Pukayinaar
- Aaramba
- Thalelam
- Oosha Birutham
- Makkanabi
- Changu Kalangi / Chattamaettam
- Mariyum Kinnaram
- Kalithaalam
- Akabhalippu
- Ondan
- Ketti Imaam
- Virutham
- Veerasha
- Param Enikathil
- Veeraar
- Naeshamaasha
- Aashayul
- Koolamammayil
- Madanamani / Veervirutham
- Kuthirabaravu
