= V. M. Kutty =

Indian musical artist

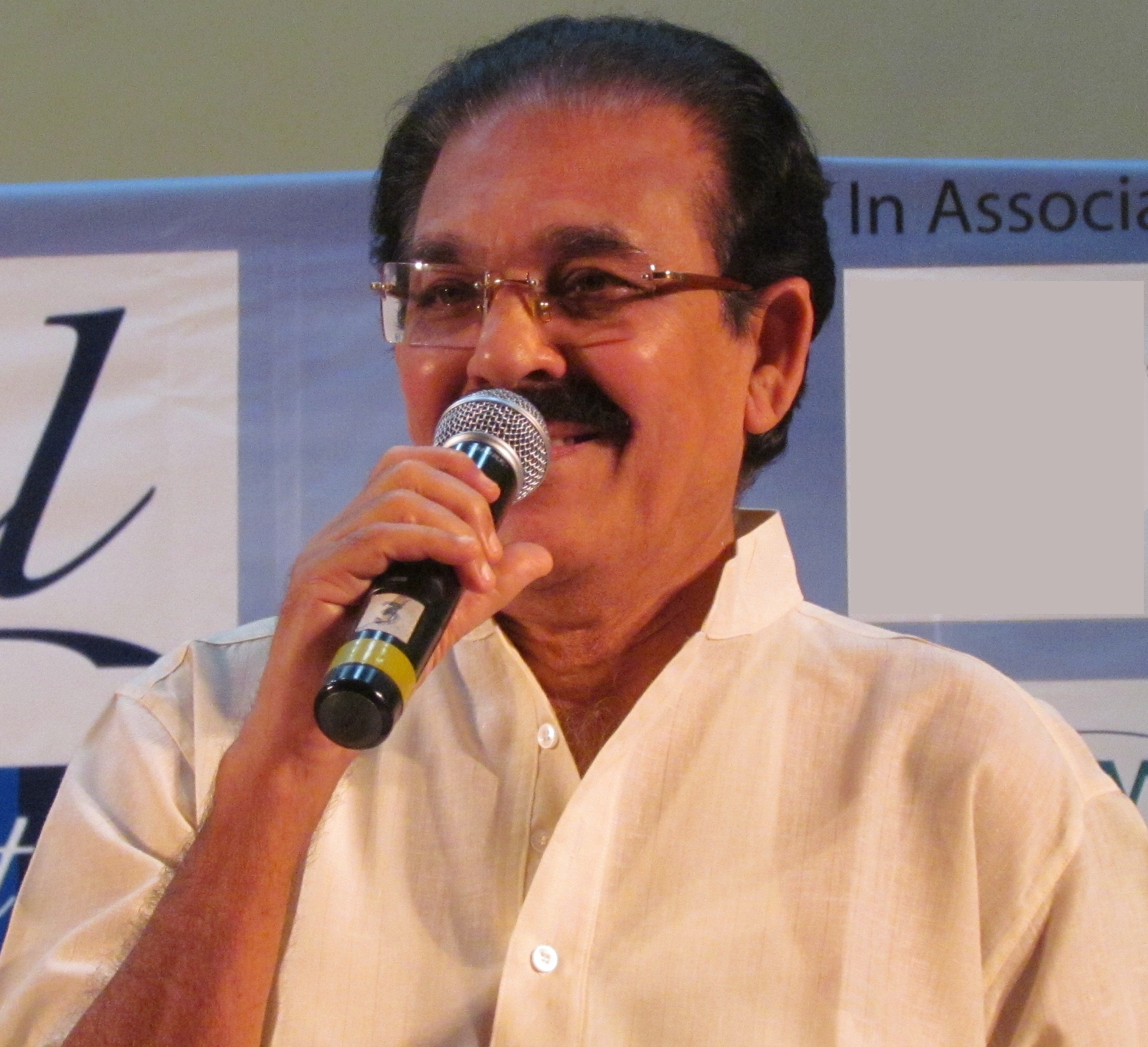
- V. M. Kutty performing in 2012

Background information
- Born: Vadakkungara Mohammed Kutty; April 16, 1935; Pulikkal, Malabar District, Madras Presidency, British India (present-day Malappuram, Kerala, India)
- Died: October 13, 2021 (aged 86) Kozhikode, Kerala, India
- Genre: Mappila songs
- Occupations: Singer, songwriter, composer, teacher
- Years active: 1954–2021
- Labels: Tharangini; Magnasound
- Spouse(s): Amina; Sulfath

Vadakkungara Mohammed Kutty (known as V. M. Kutty; 16 April 1935 – 13 October 2021) was an Indian Mappilapattu singer, writer and composer. Also known as the Sultan of Mappilapattu, he is often credited with having performed Mappila songs on stage for the first time in 1957.

Kutty was known to be one of the most popular figures among mainstream Mappilapattu singers. He had also proven talent as a lyricist. Kutty played a major role in popularizing the Mappilappattu genre through experimenting with the traditional music stream. He was a member of Kerala Sangeetha Nataka Akademi, Kerala State Chalachitra Academy, Kerala Lalithakala Akademi and Maha Kavi Moyinkutty Vaidyar Smarakam. He was the vice chairman of Kerala Folklore Academy. He has also served as an honorary secretary to the Institute of Mappila Studies.

He won Kerala Sangeetha Nataka Akademi Award under the category Keraleeya Kalakal in 1997. He received Kerala Folklore Academy fellowship in 2017. He was conferred with an honorary doctorate (D.Litt) by Thunchath Ezhuthachan Malayalam University.

== Early life ==
V. M. Kutty was born in Pulikkal, a village near Kondotty in old Malabar District of Madras Presidency (present-day Malappuram district, Kerala) to Vadakkungara Unnein Musaliyar and Ithachukutty on April 16, 1935. He completed his schooling from AMM Lower Primary School, Pulikkal and Government Model Upper Primary School, Kondotty. After passing matriculation from Government Ganapath Vocational Higher Secondary School, Feroke and TTC from Seva Mandir Post Basic Higher Secondary School, Ramanattukara, he began his career as a teacher at AM Lower Primary School in Kolathur in 1957 and then becomes the headmaster but left the job in 1985 to pursue his passion for singing.

Kutty had imbibed the first music lessons from his paternal uncle Unneen and aunt Pandikasala Ottappilakkal Fathimakutty. For Kerala's Muslim women, it was compulsory to learn the songs written in Arabi Malayalam. It was Fathimakutty who initiated Kutty into the world of Mappilappattu.

== Career ==
Mappilapattu are rooted in the folk tradition of Kerala's Muslim community. The songs were traditionally sung in the households of Muslims of Eranad in connection with occasions such as birth, marriage and death. Kutty was reportedly the first to popularise the songs outside the community and sung them at public events. Kutty began his Mappilapattu career by singing for All India Radio, Kozhikode in 1954.

Kutty formed a music group exclusively for Mappilapattu songs in 1957, Kutty's Orchestra. It was through Kutty's troupe that many women artistes made their stage debut. And one among them was Vilayil Faseela. She joined the troupe in 1970 and the troupe went to known as VM Kutty-Vilayil Faseela Group, due to the duos popularity.

In 1962, Kutty recorded few of his songs and released it through His Master's Voice as gramophone record. Kutty conducted performances across Kerala and major cities of India. With the Gulf migration from Kerala picking up pace in the 1980s, his music programmes were much in demand there. The VM Kutty-Vilayil Faseela pair becomes superhit. When his first gramophone records of folk songs became a hit, he followed it up with numerous music cassettes.

He penned lyrics for Malayalam movies Mark Antony and Poovalliyum Kunjadum. He had written approximately twelve books on Mappilapattu and its history and cultural and literary traditions. He had composed music for many folk songs, was playback singer for seven movies and also acted in movies Ulpathi, Pathinalaam Raavu and Paradesi. Kutty has composed songs for the Yesudas' Tharangini mappila songs albums Mylanchi Pattukal Vol. 1 (1984) which includes his most popular composition Samkrutha Pamagari and Mylanchi Pattukal Vol. 3 (1986).

== Personal life ==
V. M. Kutty married Amina and they had eight children. After the demise of Amina he married Sulfath.

== Death ==
V. M. Kutty died at the age of 86 on 13 October 2021 at Kozhikode. He was under treatment for heart-related ailments. The funeral was held at the Pulikkal Juma Masjid buriyal ground after the body was kept for public homage at Mahakavi Moyinkutty Vaidyar Mappila Kala Academy.
