= Ramla Beegum =

Mappilappattu singer (1944–2023)

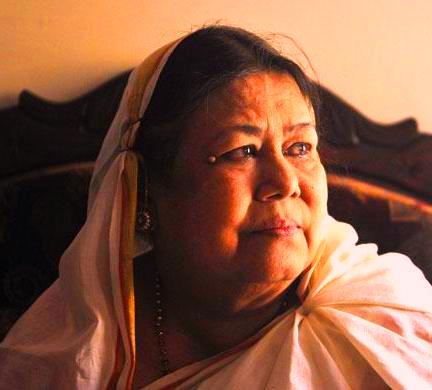
- Born: 3 November 1944 Ambalappuzha, Travancore Central Division (present day Alappuzha, Kerala, India)
- Died: 27 September 2023 (aged 78) Paroppadi, Kozhikode
- Resting place: Kannadikkal Juma Masjid, Kozhikode
- Occupation: Singer
- Genre: Mappila songs, Kadhaprasangam
- Years active: 1952 – 2018
- Spouse: Abdul Salam
- Parents: Mariyam Beevi (mother); Hussain Yusuf Yamana (father)

Ramla Beegum (3 November 1944 – 27 September 2023) was an Indian Mappilappatu singer and Kadhaprasangam artist from Kerala, known for her contributions to Mappilapattu, a traditional Muslim folk music genre. She is widely regarded as one of the pioneering female artists in Kerala to break through conservative societal norms, especially within the Muslim community as she was considered the first Muslim woman from Kerala to perform on stage, despite facing significant religious opposition. Her career spanned 55 years, lasting until her retirement in 2018.

== Early life and career ==
Ramla Beegum was born on 3 November 1944 in Ambalappuzha, Alappuzha, Kerala. She was the daughter of Hussain Yusuf Yamana, a Pashtun-origin Malayali from Alappuzha and Mariyam Beevi, also a singer from Feroke, Kozhikode. Her family had deep cultural roots, with her grandfather being an Arab from Yemen. Due to her family's Pashtun background, Hindi was often spoken at home, and Ramla began singing Hindi songs at the age of 8. She got her start in music by singing at the Azaadi Music Club, owned by her uncle Sattar Khan, in her hometown. At the age of 18, Ramla Beegum married Abdul Salam, a tabla player and music director at the Azaadi Music Club. Salam played a pivotal role in introducing her to Mappilapattu. With his guidance, Ramla found her way into the world of Mappilapattu and gained recognition within the Muslim community.

In 1963, Beegum debuted as a Kadhaprasangam (storytelling) artist with the performance of "Jameela," written by Alappey Sharaf. Known for her unique narrative style, Ramla's Kathaprasangam performances gained wide popularity. One of her most notable performances was "Husnul Jamal Badrul Munir," a love poem written in Arabic Malayalam, which she performed at more than 10,000 venues, including her first international performance in Singapore in 1971. She continued performing until 2018.

She recorded over 35 gramophone records and 500 cassettes. Over her career, she performed in 23 Kathaprasangam works, 20 of which were based on Islamic history. She also performed in non-Islamic works, including "Odayil" by Keshavdas, "Shakuntalam" by Kalidasa, and "Nalini" by Kumaran Asan, broadening her appeal across different communities. These performances were held in a variety of settings, including temples and wedding ceremonies. Following the death of her husband in 1986, Ramla took a two-year hiatus from Kadhaprasangam. However, she returned to the art scene at the request of her fans.

== Awards and recognition ==
Ramla Beegum's was the recipient of the Kerala Sangeetha Nataka Akademi Award and the Kerala Folklore Academy Award. Her most prestigious recognition was the Moinkutty Vaidyar Award, which honors outstanding contributions to the field of Mappilapattu.

== Death ==
Ramla Beegum died on 27 September 2023 at her residence in Paroppadi, Kozhikode, at the age of 78. She is survived by her daughter, Rasiya. Her burial took place at the Kannadikkal Juma Masjid, Kozhikode.
