= Vilayil =

Village in Kerala, India

Coordinates: 11°13′N 76°01′E

Vilayil is a small village in Kerala, India, near the cities of Kondotty, Kizhisseri and Areekode. The village is under the jurisdiction of the Muthuvallur and Cheekode Grama panchayats.

== Geography ==
There are many natural small canals that flow near Vilayil. One of the rivers is Vachal. The main attraction of Vilayil is Rudrani Mala (Hill).

== Notable people ==
Vilayil Faseela a notable singer specialised in Mappila Songs was born in Vilayil. Previously she was known as Vilayil Valsala prior to her conversion to Islam.

== Culture ==
Vilayi village is as predominantly Muslim populated area. Hindus are exist in comparatively smaller numbers. So the culture of the locality is based upon Muslim traditions. Duff Muttu, Kolkali and Aravanamuttu are common folk arts of this locality. There are many libraries attached to mosques giving a rich source of Islamic studies. Some of the books are written in Arabi-Malayalam which is a version of the Malayalam language written in Arabic script. People gather in mosques for the evening prayer and continue to sit there after the prayers discussing social and cultural issues. Business and family issues are also sorted out during these evening meetings. The Hindu minority of this area keeps their rich traditions by celebrating various festivals in their temples. Hindu rituals are done here with a regular devotion like other parts of Kerala. vilayil bhagavati temple and parithikottmanna siva temple are the main Hindu worship centers of this locality these temples are one of the most ancient temples of this district Malappuram.

== Transportation ==
Vilayil village connects to other parts of India through Feroke town on the west and Nilambur town on the east. National highway No.66 passes through Pulikkal and the northern stretch connects to Goa and Mumbai. The southern stretch connects to Cochin and Trivandrum. State Highway No.28 starts from Nilambur and connects to Ooty, Mysore and Bangalore through Highways.12,29 and 181. The nearest airport is at Kozhikode. The nearest major railway station is at Feroke.
