= Kalopaasana =

- Directed by: Ahwan Sebastian
- Written by: Ahwan Sebastian
- Screenplay by: Ahwan Sebastian
- Starring: Jagathy Sreekumar; Venu Nagavally; Augustine; Prajatha
- Cinematography: Hemachandran
- Edited by: Ramesh
- Music by: K. Raghavan
- Production company: Musical Theatres
- Distributed by: Musical Theatres
- Release date: 6 February 1981
- Country: India
- Language: Malayalam

Kalopaasana is a 1981 Indian Malayalam film, directed by Ahwan Sebastian. The film stars Jagathy Sreekumar, Venu Nagavally, Augustine and Prajatha in the lead roles. The film has musical score by K. Raghavan.

== Cast ==
- Jagathy Sreekumar
- Venu Nagavally
- Augustine
- Prajatha
- Ramani
- Vani

== Soundtrack ==
The music was composed by K. Raghavan and the lyrics were written by Poovachal Khader and Chowallur Krishnankutty.

No.	Song	Singers	Lyrics
1	"Kalaadevathe" [Slokam]	K. J. Yesudas	Chowallur Krishnankutty
2	"Kalaadevathe Kaalam"	K. J. Yesudas	Chowallur Krishnankutty
3	"Neram Thettiya"	K. P. Brahmanandan, Chorus	Poovachal Khader
4	"Pandu Pandoru"	S. Janaki, Chorus, Manoharan	Poovachal Khader
5	"Ushamalarikal"	P. Jayachandran	Chowallur Krishnankutty
