= Jayan (disambiguation) =

Jayan may refer to:

- K. G. Jayan Indian musician
- Sruthy Jayan Indian actress
