= Maha Kavi Moyinkutty Vaidyar Smarakam =

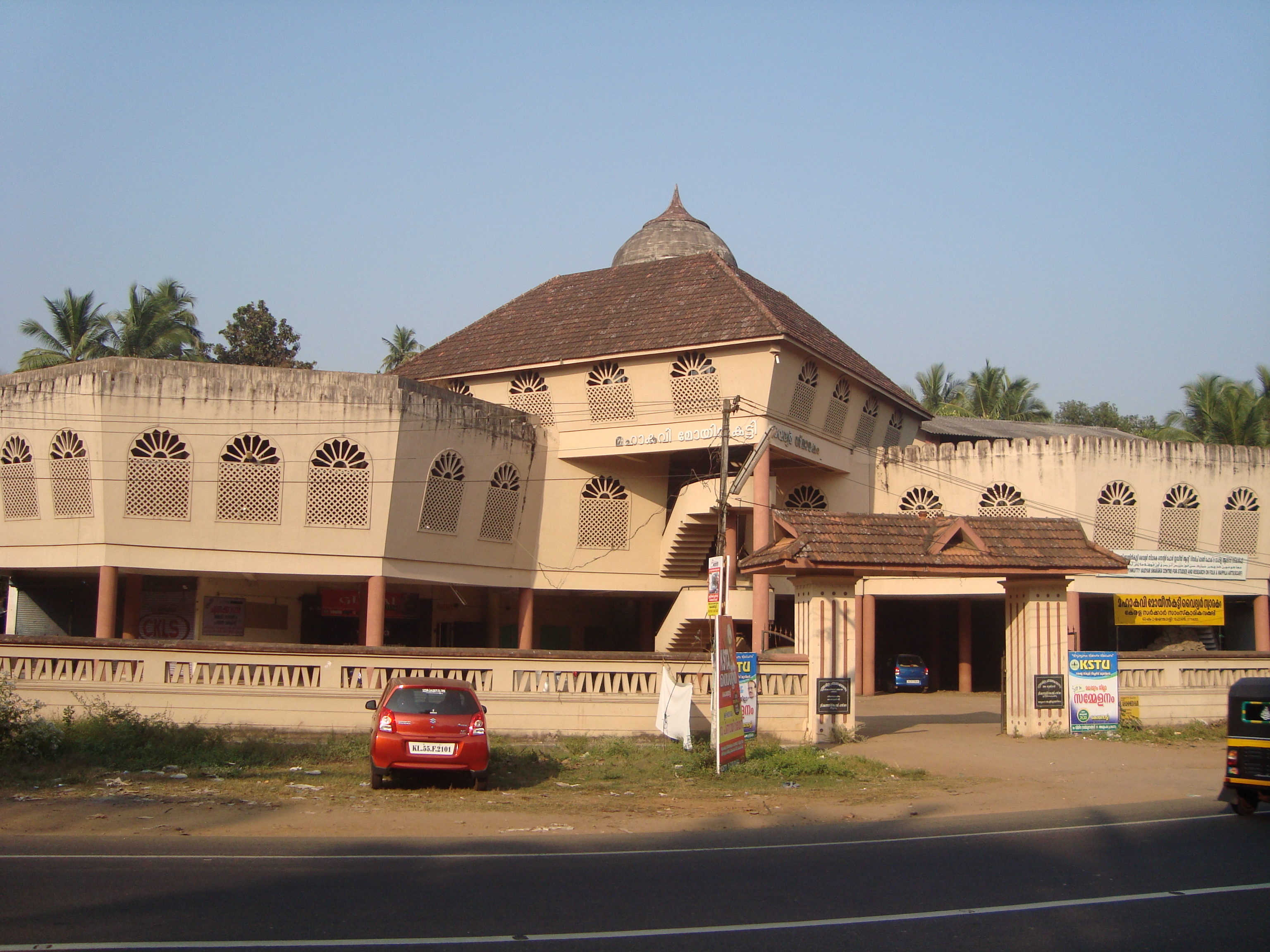
- Interactive map of Maha Kavi Moyinkutty Vaidyar Smarakam
- Location: Pandikkad, Kozhikode-Ferokh-Palakkad Hwy, Kondotty, Malappuram, Kerala, India
- Coordinates: 11.152251°N 75.957299°E
- Designer: unknown
- Type: memorial
- Completion date: 1999
- Dedicated to: Moyinkutty Vaidyar

The Maha Kavi Moyinkutty Vaidyar Smarakam (Malayalam: മഹാ കവി മോയി൯കുട്ടി വൈദ്യ൪ സ്മാരകം) is a memorial building dedicated to Moyinkutty Vaidyar (1852–1892), often referred to as Mahakavi (great poet), who is historically considered one of the most renowned poets of the Mappila pattu genre of Malayalam language.

== About Moyinkutty Vaidyar ==
Moyinkutty Vaidyar was born to Unni Mammad and Kunjamina in year 1852 at Ottupara, Malappuram district, Kerala. His father was famous practitioner of Ayurveda branch of medicines and poet of the times, he completed the work of his son based on Hijra from the 27th Ishal onwards. Moyinkutty Vaidyar continued his family tradition of Ayurvedic medical practice and hence he is known as ‘Vaidyar’ (practitioner of Ayurvedic medicine). He learnt Sanskrit and Arabic languages. He composed the romantic epic Badarul Munir – Husnul Jamal (1872) at the age of 17. It was a fictional love story of Prince Badarul Muneer and Husnul Jamal and it included many fantasy pieces as well. Towards the end of his life, he followed another style of writing. Among all his works, Mappilappattu (light /folk songs of Muslim communities) made him popular poet. He used to camp at Munchundi Mosque (Muchundipalli), Kuttichira while compiling some of his works. He died in the year 1892 at a comparatively younger age of 40 leaving behind his wife and three children. None of his direct descendants was survived after his children. His father outlived him, and completed the work Hijra on behalf of his son. Maha kavi moyinkutty vaidyar smaraka now preserves many handwritten copies of his works.

He is titled ‘Mahakavi’ (Great poet) and his major poetry works include Salaseel, Elippada, Baithila, Hijra, Ottakathinteyum maaninteyum kathakilathimala, Moolapuranam, Uhad Padappattu, Theevandichinth, Karamath Mala, Swaleeqath and Mullappoocholayil. Shabvathul Bdarul Kubra, also known as Badar Padappattu, is considered one of the finest compositions of Mappilappattu. Malappuram Padappat is the next noted song.

== Background of the monument ==
In 1999, the then Chief Minister of Kerala E. K. Nayanar inaugurated the Maha Kavi Moyinkutty Vaidyar Smarakam at the poet's birthplace in Kondotty as a cultural centre to attract research into the annotations of Badar pattu, and its studies and interpretations in Malayalam. The centre runs certificate courses in Mappilappattu and Mappila kali. It also has a folklore study centre, reference library and a historical museum attached to it. Each year it conducts the Vaidyar Mahotsavam, a two or three-day festival that includes cultural and literary programmes related to all Mappila art forms. The Vaidyar Memorial Lecture is also delivered during the festival.

== Mappila Kala Academy ==
On 9 February 2013 Mappila Kala Academy was inaugurated, functioning at the memorial building itself, by The Kerala State Minister for Culture K. C. Joseph (Irikkur politician) and was made necessary arrangement to allot fund from Non-plan fund of the Government.

== See also ==
- Moyinkutty Vaidyar
- Mappila songs
- Kondotty
