= Justin Panakkal =

Indian composer, theologian and priest (1935–2026)

- Born: 10 August 1935; Kumbalangi, Kingdom of Cochin, India
- Died: 2 April 2026 (aged 90); Manjummel, Kerala, India
- Occupations: Composer, writer, priest, theologian
- Years active: 1952–2026
- Notable work: Paithalam Yesuve; Puthiyoru Pulari; Nayaka Jeevadayaka; Yeshuvente Prananathan; Snehaswaroopa Thava Darshanam
- Parents: Job Panakkal (father); Isabel Thankamma (mother)

Justin Panakkal (10 August 1935 – 2 April 2026), commonly known as Fr. Justin, was an Indian music composer, writer, theologian and a Catholic priest for the Discalced Carmelite congregation (OCD). He was known for composing a number of popular Christian devotional songs such as "Paithalam Yesuve", "Puthiyoru Pulari", "Nayaka Jeevadayaka", "Yeshuvente Prananathan" and "Snehaswaroopa Thava Darshanam" which became a part of the Christian tradition in Kerala. He also wrote a number of books on theology.

== Life and career ==
Justin Panakkal was born on 10 August 1935, to Job Panakkal and Isabel Thankamma, in a financially poor family in Kumbalangi, an island village in the suburbs of Kochi, in the south Indian state of Kerala. His talent for music was nurtured by his mother from a very young age and encouragement from Fr. Joseph Kotilparambil and Joe Isaacs, the father of renowned musicians, Rex Isaacs, Emil Isaacs and Eloy Isaacs, helped him learn music. After the ordination as a priest on 17 March 1962, from the Carmelite Seminary where he had joined in 1954, he continued his higher studies in Rome from where he secured his doctorate in Carmelite Spirituality. Subsequently, he joined the St. Joseph’s Pontifical Seminary, Aluva as a teacher of theology and music for 28 years, and continued there as a Professor Emeritus even after his superannuation for a further 22 years.

Panakkal's three albums, Thalir Malyam, Snehapravaham and Sneha Sandesham, were produced by Tharangini Records in 1983. Many of his songs are regularly sung in the churches of Kerala. He also wrote 17 books on theology, 14 of which was in English and 3 in Malayalam, over 125 articles and was honored by OCD congregation with the title, Asian Theologian. His 90th birthday was celebrated by the Archdiocese of Verapoly in 2025 and the function was attended by celebrities such as Jerry Amaldev. Jis Joy and Berny-Ignatius.

Panakkal died at a monastery in Manjummel, on 2 April 2026, at the age of 90.

== Selected songs ==
| Song | Album | Year | Lyricist | Singer |
|---|---|---|---|---|
| Manasathin manivathil | Thalir Malyam | 1982 | Mathew Moothedam | K. J. Yesudas |
| Navyamamoru kalpana | Thalir Malyam | 1982 | Mathew Moothedam | K. J. Yesudas, Seema Bahen |
| Snehaswaroopa thava | Sneha Pravaham | 1983 | John Kochuthundil | K. J. Yesudas |
| Nayaka jeevadayaka | Sneha Pravaham | 1983 | John Kochuthundil | K. J. Yesudas |
| Paithalam Yesuve | Sneha Pravaham | 1983 | Joseph Paramkuzhi | K. S. Chithra |
| Puthiyoru pulari vidarnnu | Sneha Pravaham | 1983 | Mary Agnus | K. J. Yesudas |
| Natha hrudayathin | Sneha Sandesham | 1984 | Mathew Asariparambil | K. J. Yesudas |
| Paaril Pirnannu Devan | Sneha Sandesham | 1984 | Dominc Madakkil | Jency |

== See also ==
- Jerry Amaldev
- Berny-Ignatius
