= Karuna Cheyvan Enthu =

Karuna Cheyvan Enthu is a Malayalam keertanam composed by Irayimman Thampi on Guruvayurappan. It is set to Sri Ragam and Aadi Taalam. It was a favorite keertanam of Chembai Vaidyanatha Bhagavatar, indispensable in all his concerts as well as the last keertanam he sang before his death on 16 October 1974. Though originally set to Sri ragam, Chembai popularised the composition by singing it in Yadukula Kambhoji.
