= Alleppey Ranganath =

Indian composer (1949–2022)

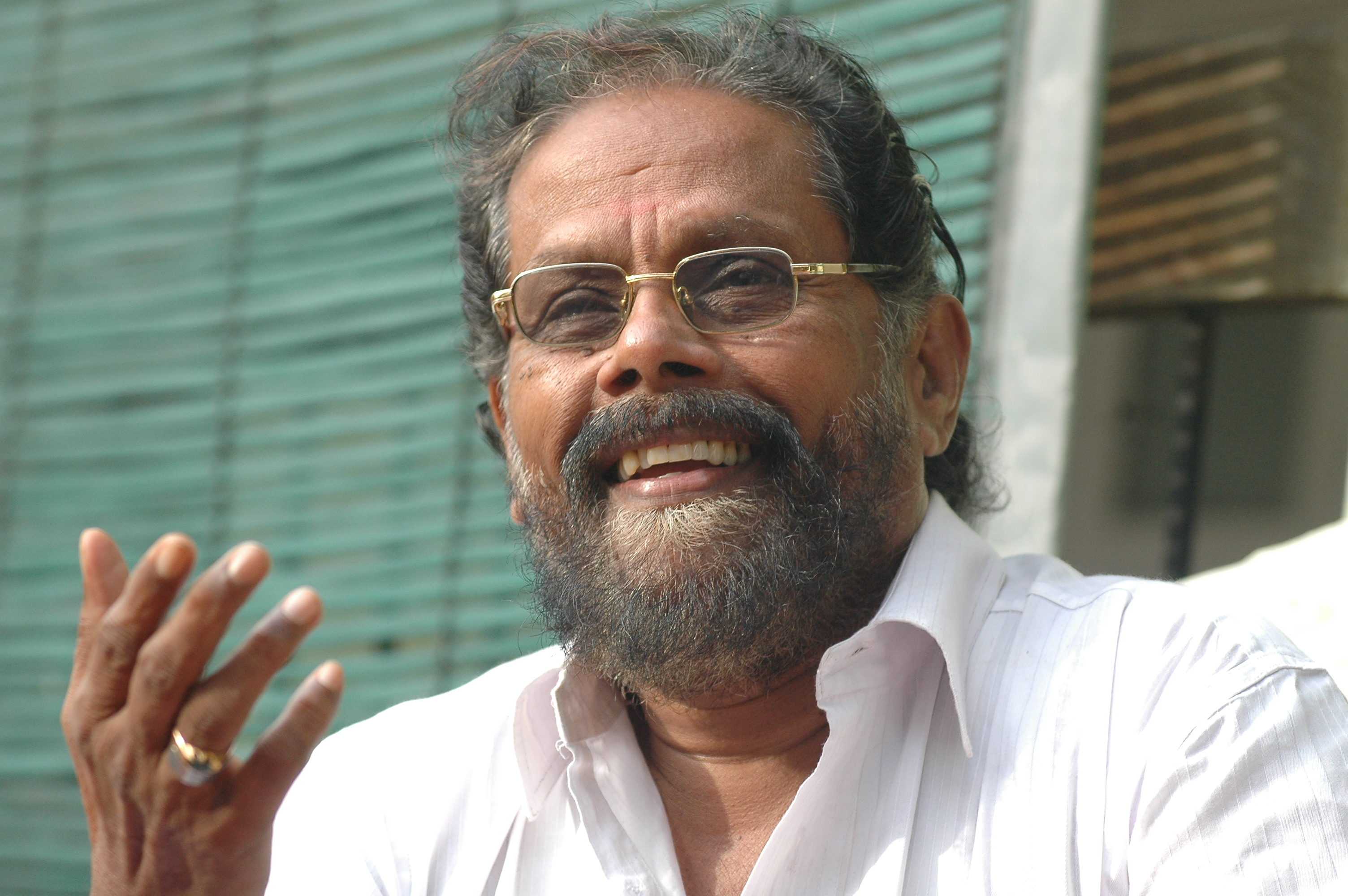
- Born: Ranganath; 9 March 1949; Alappuzha, Travancore, Union of India
- Died: 16 January 2022 (aged 72); Kottayam, Kerala, India
- Occupations: Composer, lyricist, music director, film director
- Years active: 1968-2021
- Spouse: B. Rajasri
- Children: 3
- Awards: Harivarasanam Award
- Musical career
- Genres: Indian classical music; Devotional song; Filmi
- Label: Tharangini

Alleppey Ranganath (9 March 1949 – 16 January 2022) was an Indian composer, lyricist, film director and screenwriter.

== Early life ==
Ranganath was born on 9 March 1949 in Alappuzha as the eldest son of Vezhapra Kunjukunju Bhagavathar and Gana Bhushanam M. G. Devammal, both musicians. He wrote and composed music for a play by the Kanjirapally People's Arts Club at the age of 19. Ranganath learned his first lessons in music from his father. As his father believed that an artist must master all forms, Ranganath learned classical music and Bharatanatyam as well. Till the age of 14 he lived at Vellakkinar near Alappuzha (then Alleppey). He attached the place name to his name thus became Alleppey Ranganath.

== Career ==
In 1968, Ranganath moved to his uncle's house at Ponkunnam to learn for the Malayalam Vidwan title. It was there he first introduced to dramas. His two songs in the play Kanaljaalam for People's Arts Club, Kanjirappally, were well received. When Alappuzha Redstar Theatres was launched under the stewardship of Vayalar Vinayachandran at the behest of CPI, Ranganath became a proper drama artist. He wrote songs and the script, composed music and even directed the play Darshanam that got him noticed. After Kottayam National Theatres reproduced the play two years later, it became a super hit and Ranganath's career was launched. He wrote 42 plays for various troupes notably Sahadarmini, Kudumbakshethram, Amrithasaagaram, Ponnushasinte Varavum Kathu and Ayalathe Amma. Later he developed an interest in background score and shifted to Chennai, where he was introduced to films.

He entered the film industry by playing orchestra for the popular Malayalam film song Naalikerathinte from the movie Thurakkatha Vathil. His first film composition was the song Oshana Oshana for the movie Jesus in 1973. It was P. Jayachandran who suggested His Master's Voice to record Ranganath's first stage song. Jayachandran himself sang those songs. So as a gratitude Ranganath called Jayachandran to sing for his first film song. When Ranganath didn't get other opportunities after his first film, he left Chennai, leaving his film dreams behind, and shifted to Kerala and theatre. During this tenure, he got close to K. J. Yesudas and joined his Tharangini studio as staff music director and script scrutinising officer in 1981. It was his Tharangini songs that resulted in the musician composing the background score for Priyadarshan's Poochakkoru Mookkuthi. He also composed music for Pappan Priyapetta Pappan. It was after listening to Tharangini's Children's Songs Vol. 1, Balachandra Menon called him to compose music for his film Arante Mulla Kochu Mulla. The songs Kaattil Kodumkaattil and Shaleena Soundaryame became superhits. He followed that up with films like Principal Olivil, Madakkayathra, Mamalakalkkappurathu, Captain, Achan Balan Makan Bheeman. Though he has composed music for over 25 films, several of them didn't get a release.

It was his light music compositions that made him more popular. He has composed over 2000 songs in films, drama, apart from tuning light music along with over 100 Ayyappa devotional songs. And most of them were also written by him. Out of all songs he composed, over 250 are sung by Yesudas. Also he wrote and directed 42 stage dramas and 25 dance dramas. Ranganath's Ayyappa songs extended his popularity beyond Malayalam. His Ayyappa songs became a hit in Tamil, Telugu and Kannada as well. He has composed songs for 16 movies and 52 albums in Malayalam. Most of these album songs were recorded in other regional languages also. Though he directed films like Ambadi Thannilorunni and Dhanurvedham, they hardly made an impact. It was A. R. Rahman who played the keyboard for Ambadi Thannilorunni's background music. He directed a 17-episode series on Tyagaraja for DD Malayalam and a telefilm called Ariyathe. For the last two years before his death, he had been active in the field of music research. Inspired by Tyagaraja he introduced Pancharatna Kritis in Malayalam. He had composed Malayalam keerthanams based on 72 melakarta ragas. These keerthanams are filled with most of the traditional literature and musical masters from Vedavyasan to Poonthanam. Earlier he had composed a Jesus Christ suprabhatam song in alphabetical order. He also wrote 10 keerthanams, composed in carnatic music, based on Bible verses.

== Awards ==
- 2012 – Lifetime Achievement Award by Kerala Sangeetha Nataka Akademi, in connection with the 150th birth anniversary celebrations of Rabindranath Tagore.
- 2022 – Harivarasanam Award

== Personal life ==
Ranganath was married to B. Rajasri, a classical dancer and teacher. He was living with his family at Ettumanoor.

== Death ==
Ranganath died on 16 January 2022, at the age of 72. He was undergoing treatment at Government Medical College, Kottayam as he was tested positive for COVID-19 and had respiratory issues. Just days before his death, he was awarded with Harivarasanam Award by Travancore Devaswom Board and had a concert at Sabarimala Temple. He was cremated with full state honours at his home in Ettumanoor, where he was living for the last four decades of his life.
