= T. S. Radhakrishnan =

Indian musician

- Also known as: Bhakthiganopasakasri, Radhakrishnanji
- Born: 5 November 1957 (age 67); Ernakulam, Kerala, India
- Origin: Kochi, Kerala, India
- Genres: Indian classical music, music director
- Occupation: composer
- Years active: 1972–present
- Spouse: Padma Radhakrishnan

T. S. Radhakrishnan (born 5 November 1957), popularly known as Radhakrishnaji, is an Indian composer and music producer of devotional music and film music from Ernakulam, Kerala. He has composed over 300 devotional albums. His albums have been collaborations with leading Indian singers such as K. J. Yesudas, P. Leela, P. Susheela, S. Janaki, P. Jayachandran, K. S. Chithra, Hariharan, Manjari, Unni Menon, among others. He has collaborated on more than 200 albums. Most of his songs were written by R. K. Damodaran, P. C. Aravindan, S. Ramesan Nair and Chowallur Krishnankutty .

Radhakrishnan was born on 5 November 1957 in Ernakulam, as the son of Sankaranarayana Iyer and Subbulakshmi Ammal. He is the seventh of their nine children. He was trained in Carnatic music by Tripunithura K.C. Kalyanasundaram Bhagavathar, Tanjore Subramania Bhagavathar, and Dr. S. Ramanathan. But he has not performed any Carnatic concert till date.

He composed his first album "Harisree Prasadam" with ten songs in 1980 collaborating with Malayalam lyricist R. K. Damodaran and singers P. Jayachandran, Kanhagad Ramachandran, Kavalam Sreekumar, Junior Mehaboob and Usha Manoharan. His earliest collaborations with K. J. Yesudas were the albums "Thulasi Theertham" in 1986,"Ganga Theertham Vol. 1" in 1989, both produced by Yesudas' label Tharangini Records.

Radhakrishnan played bass guitar for the western music band Hijackers for eight years before he began composing devotional music. Now he rarely touches guitar, and fully engages in devotional music. He is married to Padma, and has two children - a son named Shankar Vinayak, and a daughter named Lakshmi, both of them who follow their father's path, despite having career of their own. He is also a devotee of Sathya Sai Baba, and regularly visits Puttaparthi since the start of his career.

== Awards ==
On 11 May 2006 he was conferred the title "Bhakthiganopasakasri" for 25 years of composing devotional music by the Ernakulam Grama Jana Samooham and accepted the award from Dr. K J Yesudas.
