= Oppana =

Muslim dance form in Kerala, India

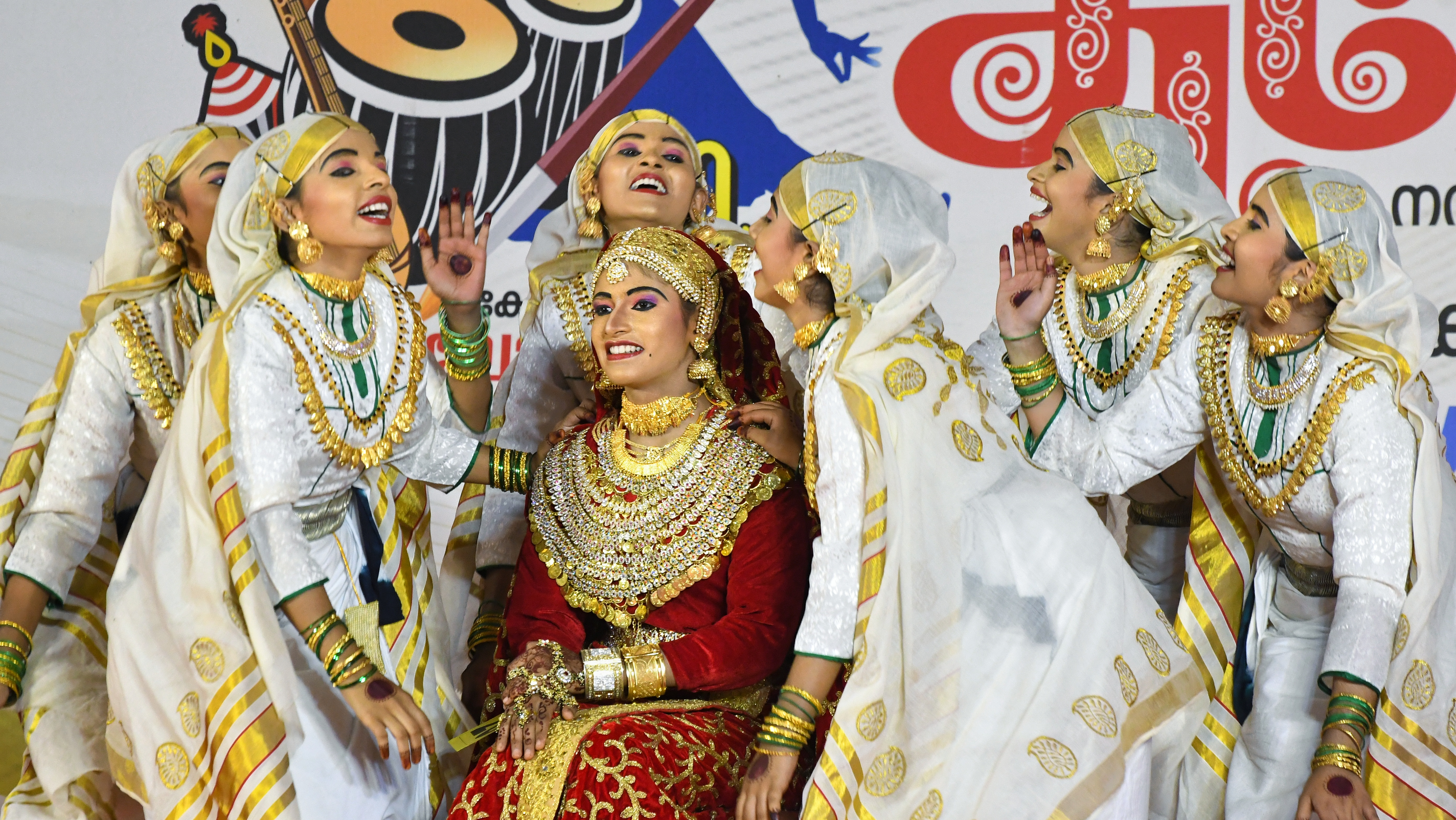
- Oppana at 2019 Kerala School Kalolsavam
- Native name: ഒപ്പന
- Etymology: Derived from an Arabic word Affna
- Genre: Muslim dance form
- Origin: Kerala, India

Oppana is a popular form of social entertainment among the Mappila (Kerala Muslims) community of Kerala, South India, prevalent throughout Kerala, especially in Malabar. The term Oppana is believed to have originated from the Arabic word "Affna". Oppana is traditionally performed in various important cultural ceremonies, and in particular, is a component of Mappila weddings. In Kerala, this art form has been revived with much popularity on the performing stages of the Youth Festivals of the student community.

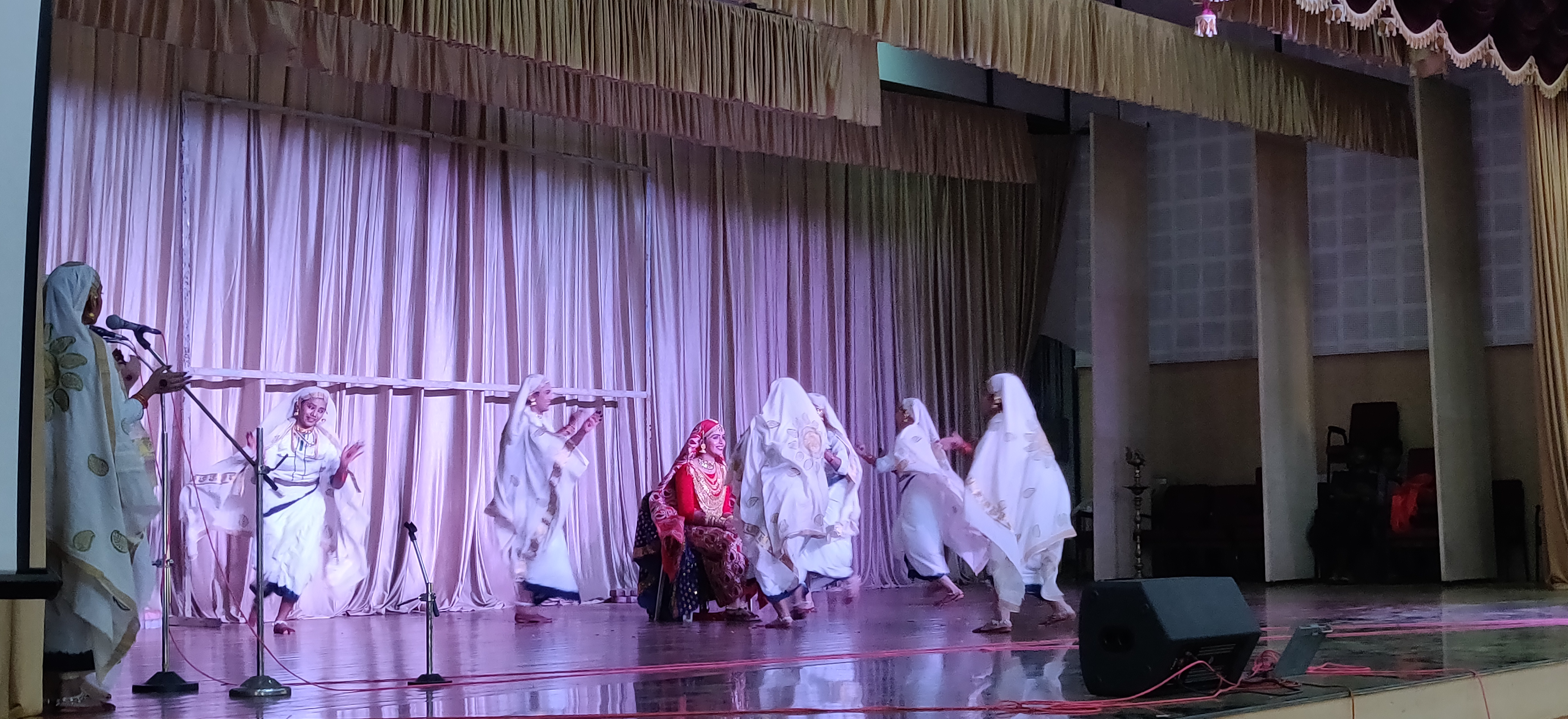
Oppana performed at a college arts fest

Oppana is generally presented by women, numbering about fifteen, including musicians, on a wedding day. The bride dressed in all finery, covered with gold ornaments and her palms and feet adorned with an intricately woven pattern of mylanchi (henna), sits amidst the circle of dancers. She is the chief spectator sitting on a peetam (chair), around which the singing and dancing take place. While they sing, they clap their hands rhythmically and move around the bride using simple steps. Two or three girls begin the songs and the rest join in chorus.

Sometimes, Oppana is also presented by men to entertain the bridegroom. It usually takes place just before the bridegroom leaves for the bride's residence where the Nikah (marriage) takes place or at the time he enters the Maniyara.

Harmonium, tabla, ganjira and elathaalam are the musical instruments employed for this performance. The accompanying song, Mappilapaattu, will be sung on the occasion.

The word Oppana may have been derived from an Arabic form, Afna. There are two types of Oppana, one is Oppana chayal and another is Oppana murukkam. When Oppana chayal is performed, they do not clap their hands. If it begins with Chayal it would also end with Chayal only.

The songs performed are Mappilapaattu in Arabi Malayalam, a blend of Arabic and Malayalam. Their words tease the couple and touch on married life and the shyness of the bride.

Oppana at a school fest

Besides weddings, oppana is sometimes performed at other Mappila family occasions, among them circumcisions, a girl's first menstruation, and the ritual bath after childbirth.

== See also ==
- Duff Muttu
- Mappila Paattu
- Kuthu Ratheeb
- Mappila
- Kerala Folklore Academy
