= Harivarasanam Award =

Award

- Country: India
- Presented by: Government of Kerala; Travancore Devaswom Board
- First award: 2012

Harivarasanam Award is an award jointly instituted by the Government of Kerala and Travancore Devaswom Board. It is awarded for contributions towards propagation of secularism, equanimity and universal brotherhood of Sabarimala through music. It has been awarded since 2012. Each year, Harivarasanam Award is announced ahead of Makaravilakku festival in Sabarimala. The award consists of a cash prize of ₹0.1 million, a citation and a plaque. The award was named after Harivarasanam.

== Award recipients ==
Year	Recipient	Ref(s)
2012	K. J. Yesudas	
2013	K. G. Jayan	
2014	P. Jayachandran	
2015	S. P. Balasubrahmaniam	
2016	M. G. Sreekumar	
2017	Gangai Amaran	
2018	K. S. Chithra	
2019	P. Susheela	
2020	Ilaiyaraaja	
2021	Veeramani Raju	
2022	Alleppey Ranganath	
2023	Sreekumaran Thampi	
2024	Veeramanidaasan	
2025	Kaithapram Damodaran Namboothiri	
2026	Thiruvizha Jayashankar	
