= Madakkayathra =

- Directed by: George Vettam
- Screenplay by: P. K. Mohan
- Produced by: George Thankachan
- Cinematography: T. N. Krishnankutty Nair
- Music by: Alleppey Ranganath
- Release date: 23 April 1985
- Country: India
- Language: Malayalam

Madakkayathra is a 1985 Indian Malayalam film, directed by George Vettam and produced by George Thankachan. The film has musical score by Alleppey Ranganath.

== Soundtrack ==
The music was composed by Alleppey Ranganath and the lyrics were written by Bichu Thirumala.

No.	Song	Singers	Lyrics	Length (m:ss)
1	"Arayaal Kuruvikal"	K. J. Yesudas	Bichu Thirumala	
2	"Uthraadakkilye"	K. J. Yesudas	Bichu Thirumala	
