= Mappila songs =

Folklore Muslim song genre

Mappila songs (or Mappila Paattu) are a folklore Muslim song genre rendered to lyrics, within a melodic framework (Ishal), in Arabi Malayalam by the Mappilas of the Malabar region in Kerala, India. Mappila songs have a distinct cultural identity, while at the same time remaining closely linked to the cultural practices of Kerala.

The songs often use words from Persian, Hindustani, and Tamil, apart from Arabic and Malayalam, but the grammatical syntax is always based in Malayalam. They deal with themes such as religion, love, satire, and heroism, and are often sung at marriages, get-togethers and family functions. Mappila Paattu form an integral part of the heritage of Malayalam literature today and is regarded by some as the most popular branch of Malayalam literature, enjoyed by all Malayali communities in Kerala and Beary-speaking communities of Karnataka.

== History ==
Mappila songs have been in circulation for over seven centuries, with the first dated work Muhyidheen Mala attributed to Qadi Muhammad in 1607 AD. Thereafter a large number of literary materials were produced in this medium; one authority has calculated that of these more than 1600 items, complete or fragmentary, were known by 1976. Over the centuries, various types of Mappila Pattu were composed, in accordance with the religious and political surroundings in the lives of the Mappilas of Malabar. The early centuries were primarily based on devotional works, while the colonial era was marked by the battle song genre called Padappattu. Various other categories also grew during the centuries with subjects ranging from romantic ballads and marriage songs to philosophical ideas, sea journeys and even flood ordeals.

== Early works ==
The earliest known dated works in Mappilappattu are from the 17th century and primarily belonged to the Mala genre.

=== Malappattu ===
The Mala genre of Mappila songs, generally written in Arabi-Malayalam script are praises of pious personalities of Islam who were supposed to have gained high spiritual status. Generally, most such works were themed on the lives of Sufi saints (Auliya). Most of these songs narrate "superhuman" deeds of these saints. The songs became popular in an era when Sufism gained a strong foothold amongst the Mappilas. Each Mala often corresponded to the leader of a Sufi order called Thareeqath, who was abundantly showered praises in the poetry, for qualities often well-exceeding the limits of human capabilities. Popular among these are the Muhyidheen Mala, the Rifa'i mala, the Shaduli Mala, the Ajmeer Mala, and the Nafeesath mala. Each of these corresponded to their respective Sufi orders while the last is about Nafeesathul Misriyya, a woman Sufi saint of Egypt more commonly known as Sayyida Nafeesa.

The 17th century also witnessed the composition of other popular works in the Malappattu genre, namely the Rifai Mala (1623) by Ahammadul Kabeer, Uswath Mala (1628) and Valiya Naseehath Mala (1674) by Manantakath Kunhikoya Thangal.

=== 18th century ===
Songs of the 18th century were primarily of the Kissa genre, narrating stories of the prophets of Islam or Sufi saints. Examples of such songs include the Ibrahim Nabi Qissa and the Ibrahim Ibn Adham Kissa. Songs like the Kappappattu and Safalamaala by Shujayi Moidu Musaliyar conveyed ideological messages to the community in the era of post-Portuguese years when the identity and existence of the Mappilas were in a shattered state.

Kunhayan Musaliyar

Kunhayan Musaliyar lived in the early 18th century. He authored the popular works titled Nool Mad'h (1737 A.D.), Nool Mala(1785 A.D.) and Kappappattu. Nool Mad'h was a devotional work on Prophet Muhammed with 666 lines composed in 16 different Ishalukal (Ishals). Kappapattu consisted of 600 lines composed in a single Ishal, narrating with wit and humour, the voyage of the human body through the journey of life, portrayed here as a vessel in the ocean voyaging through the seas. The Kappappattu remained hugely popular for centuries, next only to the Muhyiddeen Mala.

Umar Qadi

Veliyankode Umar Qadi, (1757-1852) was a scholar, poet and freedom fighter from Veliyankode, near Ponnani, well known for his tax non-cooperation movement against the British rule in the Malabar. He composed songs of various subjects, ranging from the Cheraman Perumal to Arabic grammar. Other poems of his criticized the wrongdoings of members of his own community. He also wrote many poems in Arabic.

=== 19th century and early 20th century ===
The dawn of the 19th century saw the advent of British rule in the Malabar. The songs of this era are marked by the rising anti-British feelings in the Mappila society in the backdrop of the agrarian tenancy discontent against the British backed Jenmi landlords. Most of the songs of the era fall under the Padappattu ( battle songs) genre.

==== Padappattu ====
The first dated work in this genre was the Zaqqoom Padappattu dated 1836. This song was actually an Arabi-Malayalam translation of the Tamil work Zakkoon Padayppor composed by Varishay Mukiyudheen Poolavar of Madurai in 1686. Alim Umar Labba, a Mappila religious scholar from Kayalpattanam translated it into Arabi-Malayalam. Many of the tunes (Ishals)of Zakoon Padayppor have been largely utilized by famous Arabi Malayalam poet, Moin Kutty Vaidyar, especially in his master piece work, Badre Padappattu.

The songs of the Padapattu genre can be classified into four different types:

- Islamic folk tales : These songs have no relation to actual historic events but either from a folk tale, a legend or simply an imaginary story related to Islamic traditions. Songs of this category include the Zaqqum Padappattu and the Jinn Padappattu. The former is a story about an imaginary confrontation of King Zaqqum of Iraq and Prophet Muhammed of Arabia while the latter is story about the Jinns, the other creation parallel to human beings as taught by the Qur'an.
- Islamic history : These songs narrated events from the early years of Islam, and in particular the early battles of Islam. The Badar padappattu, the Hunayn Padappattu and the Karbala padappattu are characteristic of this category.
- Mappila history : Songs of this type typically narrated the heroic deeds of the Muslims of Kerala and eulogize the martyrs among them, especially in their battles against the Portuguese and British colonial powers and local Jenmi landlords. Typical among these are the Kotturpalli Mala, Moyinkutty Vaidyar's Malappuram Padappattu(1883) etc. and the Cherur Padappattu. The first depicts the heroism of Veliyankode Kunhi Marakkar, a warrior who saves a 17-year-old Mappila girl from the hands of Portuguese kidnappers but is martyred at the end of the battle. The eulogy here is enhanced with the simultaneity of the character's death with his hour of marriage. The other two narrate stories of Mappila attacks on the British and the Jenmi landlords during the 19th century. The Cherur Padappattu, composed by two poets named Mammad Kutti and Muhyidheen in 1841, refers to a battle between Mappila rebels and the army of the East India Company. The rebels had assassinated Kaprat Krishna Panikkar, the adhikari of Tirurangadi and sought refuge in a deserted house. The soldiers later surround them and in the ensuing battle, seven Mappilas and 20 of the Company army lost their lives. The Cherur Padappattu narrates this story praising the "martyrs" amongst the Mappillas in this battle.
- Fictional songs: These songs were about purely imaginary subjects. The elippada which narrates a 3-day imaginary battle between rats and cats based on a Panchatantra story falls under this category.

The common feature of all these songs were their pattern of narration of the bravery of the heroes depicted.

While the battle songs roused the feelings of the community against the authorities, this era also witnessed the popularization of romantic ballads like Moyinkutty Vaidyar's Badarul Muneer Husnul Jamal and Chettuvayi Pareekkutty's Soubhagya Sundari. One of the notable aspects of both these works were the age of the authors at the time of the composition; Vaidyar was said to have been 17 or (by some reports) 20 at the time and so was Pareekkutty.

==== Moyinkutty Vaidyar ====
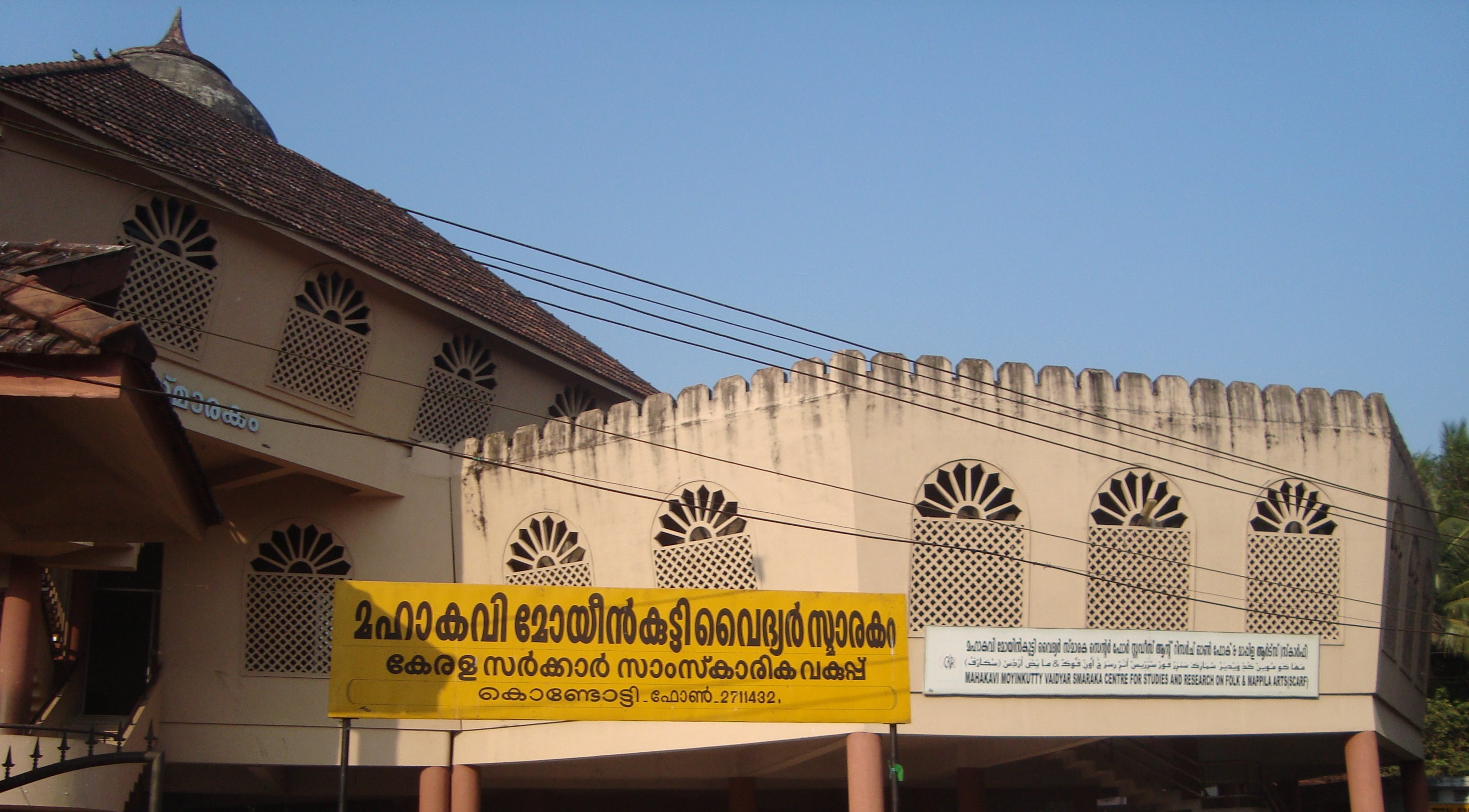
Mahakavi Moyinkutty Vaidyar Memorial Center for Studies and Research on Folk and Mappila Arts at the Vaidyar Smarakam, Kondotty, Malappuram, Kerala.

Moyinkutty Vaidyar (1857-1891), often referred to as Mahakavi (great poet) is historically considered one of the most renowned and authentic Mappila poets. Born into an Ayurvedic family in 1857 at Kondotti in Malappuram district, he was well versed in Sanskrit and Arabic. At a very young age of seventeen, he composed the romantic epic Badarul Munir - Husnul Jamal (1872) .

His later works were on totally different themes that were essentially war songs in nature. The Badar Padappattu and Malappuram Padappatt are the most popular songs of this genre. Shabvathul Badarul Kubra(1875), more popularly known as the Badar Padappattu is considered one of the finest compositions of Mappilappattu . It narrates the tale of the Battle of Badr by Prophet Muhammed and his companions. The Malappuram Padappattu (1883), also known as the Madhinidhi Mala describes the undercurrents of peasant life and struggles in Malappuram in the 18th and 19th centuries.

The songs of Moyinkutty Vaidyar are distinguished by their depth of imagination, the beauty of the metaphors used, the creativity comparisons involved and the variety of their ishals (tunes/modes).

==== Pulikkottil Hyder ====
Pulikkottil Hyder, born in 1879 at Wandoor was a popular poet who composed short songs in Arabi-Malayalam on topics of common interest, often attacking social evils. His simple lyrics on ordinary life of the Mappilas defied the traditional patterns of Mappilappattu thus giving him the name " The Kunchan Nambiar of Mappilappattu". In Vellappokka Maala, he describes a heavy flood that affected all throughout the Malabar, Mysore and Travancore. The sufferings of common men in the flood are depicted beautifully using only ordinary Malayalam vocabulary.
The Pulikkotil Hyder Smaraka Puraskaram, instituted by the Mahakavi Moyinkutty Vaidyar Smaraka Committee and given to personalities who have contributed to the art of Mappilappattu is named after him. The foundation for a memorial for the poet was laid in his hometown Wandoor by former Chief Minister of Kerala C.H. Mohammed Koya in April 1979, but the work has remained incomplete ever since. In 1979, the Mappila Kala Sahithya Vedi published a compilation of his works titled "Pulikkottil Krithikal".

==== Other poets ====
Chakeeri Moyidin Kutty

Chakeeri Moyidin Kutty of Cherur, near Vengara, authored his poetry on the Battle of Badr titled Ghazvath Badril Kubra (The great Battle of Badar)) in 1876, a year after Moyinkutty Vaidyar's Badar Padappattu. It began a fresh pattern in Mappilappattu where the poetry was in pure Malayalam language, unlike the earlier works that involved use of Arabic, Kannada and Tamil. The poem was also known as the Chakkeeri Badr, to distinguish it from the other works on the same subject by other poets. The work is said to have been modified a couple of times by the author himself. He also authored a Malayalam-Arabic-Sanskrit dictionary and is considered one of the major Mappila poets of the 19th century.

Chettuvayi Pareekkutty

(b. 1853) author of Futhuhussaman, Minhathul Bari, Soubhagya Sundari and Adi Ahaduna was another well-known poet of the era. He was well versed in Tamil, Sanskrit and classical music.

Futhuhussaman is not an original work of Chettuvayi Pareekukutty. It was a translation of a Tamil work by same name.

=== 1920s and later ===
The early 20th century witnessed the growing influence of Malayalam in the Mappilappattu genre. This period was characterized by the rise of theological reform movements and nationalist mobilization in the Malabar. Songs of the era also involved themes of Pan-Indian nationalism and the Independence movement against the British. The 1921 Malabar Rebellion gave birth to a large variety of songs of this genre.

T Ubaid

Born T Abdurahman (1908-1972) at Thalankara in Kasargode, T Ubaid was one of the greatest figures of Malayalam literature in the 20th century. He was well versed in English, Malayalam, Arabic, Urdu, Kannada, Sanskrit and Tamil. Often referred to as Mahakavi Ubaid, he was both a poet and a researcher of Mappilappattu, documenting a large collection of Mappila songs popular in the North Malabar through oral tradition. His historic speeches and rendering of hitherto unheard kissa pattukal at the Kozhikode Sahitya Parishath conference in 1947 and similar conferences drew attention of the intellectuals of Malayalam literature to the rich literary traditions of Mappilappattu.

S.A. Jameel

S.A. Jameel is a poet widely associated to the kathu pattu (Letter songs) genre of Mappila songs. His most popular works remain the 1976 letter and reply duet Ethrayum bahumanappetta ente priya bharthavu vayikkuvan (Oh my dear respected husband) and Abu Dhabeelullorezhuthupetti (A letterbox in Abu Dhabi). The former is a wife's letter to her husband abroad in Abu Dhabi requesting his return, while the latter is the husband's reply to his wife. The poet, who had psychological counselling sessions with many of the womenfolk of Malabar living separated lives from their husbands in the Gulf, described the anguishes of separation as felt by the women in the first song. The lyrics of the song referred in particular to the sexual and emotional needs of the woman and generated both praise and controversy within the community. The second song, composed as the husband's reply was also based on his interactions with the diaspora Mappila community during his visits to the Middle East in the late 1970s. It described the hardships and emotional dilemma faced by the migrant workers separated from their families. The songs created a huge impact on the whole diaspora community across different religions at the time prompting many to leave their jobs and return to their homeland for good. Though the kathu pattu (songs in the form of letters) existed before the works of S.A. Jameel, it was his works that popularized the genre amongst the common people of the Malabar.

== Social context ==
Religious teachings

In the early years of Mappilappaattu, the songs were written with a specific purpose of educating the masses about the religious teachings of Islam. In an era that preceded the printing press, oral traditions played an important role in the religious education of the Mappilas, especially those who could not read or write. Some of the early songs written entirely for this purpose included the Aqeedath Mala, Niskaarapaattu, Naseehath Mala, Kombinte paattu, Liqa Mala, Amaliyyath Mala etc.

Anti-colonial struggles

In the context of the Mappila uprisings against the British rule in Malabar in the 19th and 20th centuries, the Pada pattu played an important role in rousing Mappila sentiments of the Mappila peasantry in their struggle. The contribution of these ballads was a vital factor in the growth of a collective consciousness of a heroic tradition amongst the Mappilas. After almost every uprising of the 19th and 20th centuries, songs eulogizing the heroism of the participants and idealizing their sacrifice were composed and propagated by Mappila bands which went around the countryside singing them. Ballads were also popularized through group singing at social and domestic functions. These war songs often contained vivid descriptions of carnal pleasures of paradise awaiting the "martyrs". Prior to the launch of an attack, the rebels in aspiration of "martyrdom" used to recite the Mala pattu alongside other preparations.

The struggle by the Mappilas against Portuguese invaders in the 16th century led by Mappila legends like Kunhali Marakkars were also a major theme of such songs. Another popular theme in these songs were the battles of the early Muslims of Arabia which is evident in songs like Badar Padappattu, Uhad Padappattu, Hunain Padappattu, Makkan Fathahu and Khandaq Padappattu. The songs provoked the Mappila population against the British authorities to the extent that a large number of them including the publications of the Cherur Padappattu were confiscated and destroyed by the authorities.

These songs also provided an insight for historians into the thoughts and viewpoints of the rebels and have been used for authentic historic compilation. The songs on the Malappuram shahids provide the earliest description of an armed struggle between the Mappilas and the Jenmi landlord class in the pre-Mysore era. William Logan, refers to the Cherur Padappattu in the Malabar Manual while describing the incident. (Pg 560, Vol 1, Asian Educational Services, 2000). Roland Miller also quotes from this ballad in "Mappila Muslims of Kerala: a study in Islamic trends". (pg 119, Orient Longman, 1992.)

The 1921 Malabar Rebellion also spawned a large number of Mappila songs. Many of these songs describe the events at the Khilafat movement in Malabar and offer a view into the conditions in Malabar during the era. A song sung at a Khilafat meeting at Tirurangadi in 1921 described the aims of the Khilafat Movement in a mindset of complete harmony with the National movement led by Mahatma Gandhi:
Munthiya Banduvay Hinduvum Muslimum (Hindus and Muslims have deep relations)
Moulana showathum Doula Khilafathum (The nation of Khilafath that the Moulana shows us)
Entri Vannavidham Mahatma Gandhi than sahitham (He brought it to us along with the great Gandhi)
Ahmed Kutty composed the Malabar Lahala enna Khilafat Patt in 1925 describing the events of the rebellion. Even the prisoners of the rebellion like Tannirkode Ossankoya used to compose songs in their letters to their relatives.

Marriage

The Mailanchi Pattu, the Oppana Pattu and the Ammayi Pattu belong to the category of Mappila Pattukal dealing with love and marriage. They are sung in chorus in connection with marriage festivals, often accompanied by rhythmic clapping by women.

Migration

In the "Gulf boom" years of the 1970s and 80s, mass migration of workers from the Malabar to the oil-rich Gulf states of the Middle East resulted in households where the working men were often separated from their womenfolk and the only means of communication was the letter. This brought about a huge interest in the Kathu pattu (letter song) genre of Mappilappattu. The lyrics of these songs often connected closely to the lives of the migrant workers and their families and it popularized this genre of Mappilappattu.

Others

Mappila songs occasionally did also narrate stories outside the Muslim community. One such ballad was called the Mappila Ramayana deals with the story of the Hindu mythological figure Sri Rama.

== Female presence in Mappilappattu ==
Mappila womenfolk feature prominently in the culture and literature of Mappilappattu in various ways. The presence of female poets in Mappilappattu literature long predated the first female presence in Malayalam literature. A large number of Mappila songs also had female subjects as their main theme.

Songs of the Oppana genre typically described the beauty of a bride in colourful terms. The famous Badarul Muneer Husnul Jamal by Moyinkutty Vaidyar devotes a section to describe the beauty of the heroine named Husnul Jamal.

Another popular subject of composition was the lives of the prominent women of the early years of Islam in Arabia. The popular ChandiraSundariMala by female poet PK Haleema narrated the marriage of the Aisha with Prophet Muhammed. Other songs by female poets like CH Kunhayisha, V Ayishakkutti etc. depicted sorrowfully the final moments of Khadija, wife of Prophet Muhammed and Fatima, his daughter. The famous Nafeesath Mala by Nalakath KunhiMoideen Kutty praises a woman named Nafeesa, who belonged to the lineage of the Prophet. It ends with a prayer for her well-being in the Hereafter. Other major female poets include Puthur Amina, Kundil Kunhamina, B Ayishakkutty and K Aminakkutty.

Songs by male poets like the Mariyakkuttiyude Kath by Pulikkottil Hyder and the Dubai kathu pattu by S.A. Jameel also focussed on the emotional aspects of the life of the womenfolk in the Mappila community.

== Influence ==
Mala songs and ordinary life

The Mala songs were believed to inculcate a religious belief in those who recited and listened to them and were hence given a spiritual status corresponding to the works of Ezhuthachan and Cherusseri Namboothiri amongst the Hindu population of Malabar. Many were recited daily at Mappila homes. The Muhyidheen Mala was considered a protection from all calamities while the Rifa'i Mala was chanted as a cure from burns and snake bites. Similarly, the Nafeesath Mala was prescribed for pregnant woman for an easy child birth. The importance accorded to the Mala songs was so high that their memorization was regarded as a qualification for a would-be bride.

Songs of Moyinkutty Vaidyar used to be sung and explained to public audiences in what was known as Seera Parayana Sadassu (history recital sessions). These often lasted for many nights together and were a popular scene throughout the Malabar.

The early 20th century witnessed the rise of reform movements within the Mappila community. They objected to the messages of the Mala songs citing their contradictions with many of the basic tenets of Islam, often referring to them as Khurafath. Occasionally though, they used same medium to spread their message. Examples of these included the Parishkara Mala and the Durachara Mala.

Cinema and poetry

The spirit of their themes and beauty of representation in the Mappila Paattukal have left a lasting impression on Malayalam poetry. Well-known poets like P. Krishna Kumar, P. Bhaskaran, and Vayalar Ramavarma have composed a great number of popular Mappila songs. Mappila songs have been popular in the Malayalam cinema ever since the success of the 1954 classic Kayalarikaathu vala erinjappol by K. Raghavan from the movie Neelakuyil. Other popular melodies include Oru kotta ponnundallo from the movie Kuttikuppayam and Palanu thenanu from Umma by M.S Baburaj. Some of the movies that prominently include songs of this genre are Mailanchi, Pathinalamravu, Ulpathi, Sammanam, Manya Maha Janangale, Sammelanam, 1921 and Marc Antony.

Television

"Mylanchi" is the most popular reality show by Asianet. The show is on the way to the fifth season named "Mylanchi Little Champions". "Pathinalam Ravu" by MediaOne has established as the most popular reality show in a short span of time. A show which upholds the traditional values of Mappila Pattu,"Pathinalam Ravu" is now going through its third edition. Patturumal is a popular reality show on Mappilapattu being aired on Kairali TV. Jai Hind TV channel has telecast a reality showy by name "Mappilapattukal".

== Personalities ==
S. M. Koya noted for his genre of Malabar Mappila Pattukal has won the appreciation of and respected by of film music directors like K. Raghavan, M. S. Baburaj, and A. T. Ummer. In 1925, Gul Mohammed, father of veteran singer K.G. Sathar, recorded his voice in gramophone, which became the first gramophone record in Malayalam. The singer and composer V. M. Kutty made significant contribution to popularise the Mappila songs. He is credited with having performed Mappila songs on stage for the first time in 1957. Eranjoli Moosa is also another singer, who is considered to have revolutionised the Mappila songs and is often considered one of the greatest Mappila singers of all time. He has performed solo in more than 1000 stages. Other respected names who composed Mappila songs are Punnayurkulam V Bapu, O. M. Karuvarakkundu and Mohar Munir. Songs written by P.T. Abdul Rahman and sung by S.V.Peer Muhammad were compiled in a book Pīrmuhammad pāṭiya putiya Māppiḷappāṭṭukaḷ (Songs sung by Pir Muhammad). Abdul Hayy, IP Sidique

Balakrishan Vallikkunnu is a researcher in Mappila literature and has researched various aspects of the messages conveyed in Mappila songs, including the anti-colonial sentiments in them. The other prominent personalities associated with this genre of music include:

Singers

- M Kunhi Moosa
- K.G Sathar
- V. M. Kutty
- S. M. Koya
- Eranjoli Moosa
- M.S. Baburaj
- Vilayil Faseela
- Peer Muhammed
- V. T. Murali
- Ramla Beegum
- N.P. Fousiya
- Aysha Beegum
- Vadakara Krishnadas
- M. Shailaja
- Mukkam Sajitha
- Farisha Khan
- Laila Razak
- Azeez Thayineri
- H. Mehaboob
- A.V.Mohamed
- E.P.Shihab
- M. P. Ummerkutty
- Kannur Saleem
- Kannur Shareef
- Shameer Chavakkad
- Sindhu Premkumar
- Nasnin (Baby Nasnin)
- Randathani Hamsa
- IP Sidique

Poets

- Nalakath Kassim
- Bappu Vellipparamba
- K. T. Moideen
- P.T. Abdul Rahiman
- Pakkar Pannoor
- Badarudheen parannur{saharbari}
- Nasarudheen Mannarkkad
- Faisal Kanmanam
- OM Karuvaramkund
- Shamsu Ayippuzha
- Fasal Koduvally
- Shaheer Chennara
- Hamsa Narokav

Composers

- M.S.Baburaj
- K.Raghavan
- Chand Pasha
- K. V. Abootty
- Shihab Areekode
- Mohsin Kurikkal
- M A Azeez Bhai

== Institutions ==
=== Vaidyar Smarakam ===
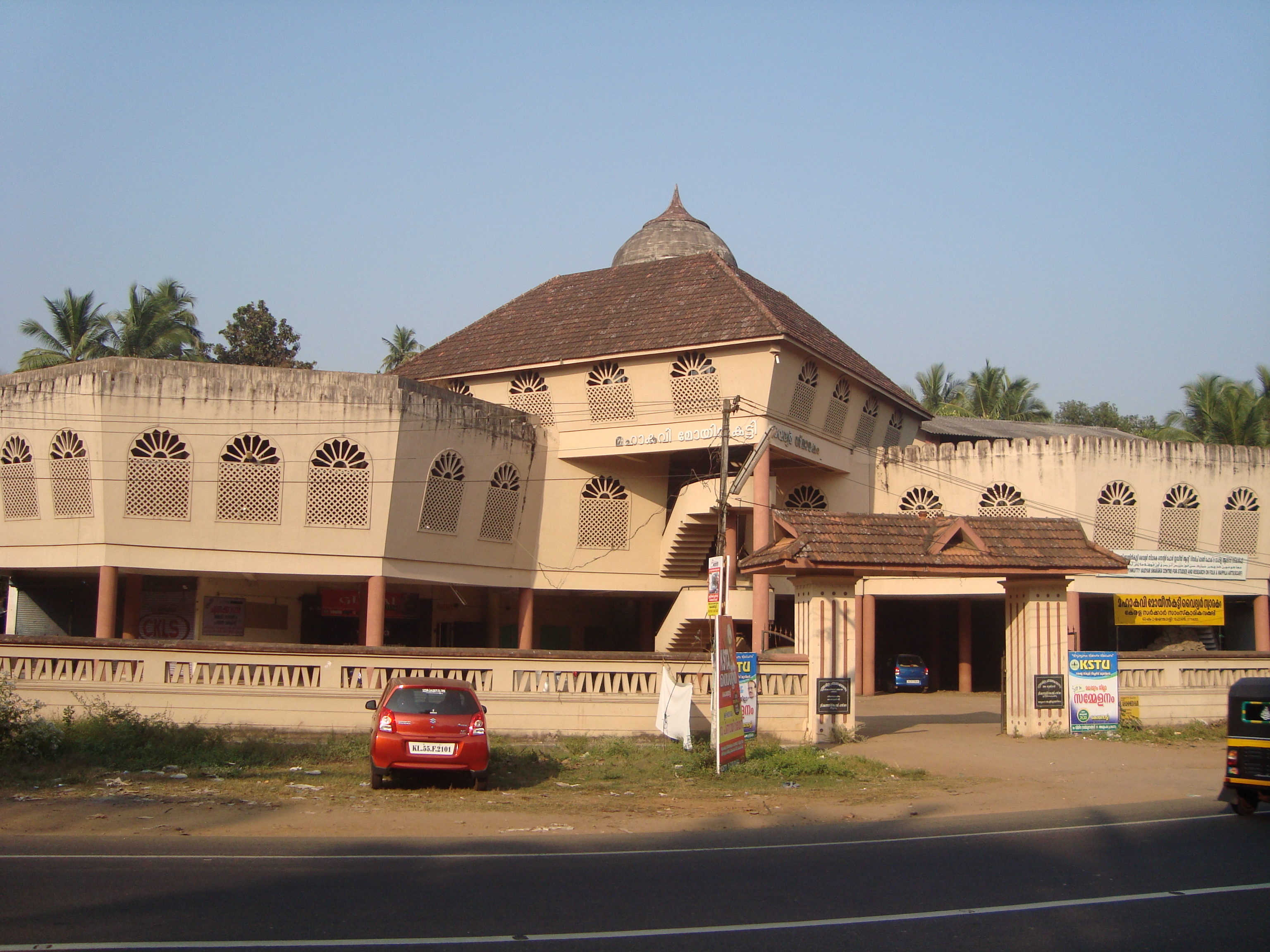
Mahakavi Moyinkutty Vaidyar Smarakam at the poet's birthplace in Kondotty in Malappuram district, Kerala.

In 1999, then Chief Minister of Kerala E. K. Nayanar inaugurated the Mahakavi Moyinkutty Vaidyar Smarakam at the poet's birthplace in Kondotty as a cultural centre to attract research into Mappilappattu, and its studies and interpretations in Malayalam. The foundation stone was laid by, then Chief Minister, K. Karunakaran on 24 December 1994. The centre runs certificate courses in ‘Mappilappattu’ and ‘Mappila kali’. It also has attached to it a folklore study centre, a historical museum, and a reference library containing rare manuscripts in Arabi-Malayalam and other handwritten manuscripts. Each year it conducts the Vaidyar Mahotsavam, a two or three-day festival that includes cultural and literary programmes related to all Mappila art forms. The Vaidyar Memorial Lecture is also delivered during the festival. In 2005, a two-volume compilation of his works was released as a book Mahakavi Moyinkutty Vaidyar, Sampoorna Krithikal by the Mahakavi Moyinkutty Vaidyar Smaraka Samithi under the aegis of the Culture Department, Government of Kerala. It also published a collection of essays on Moyinkutty Vaidyar titled Mahakavi Moyinkutty Vaidyar Padanangal. On 12 June 2008, M. A. Baby, Minister of Education and Culture, Government of Kerala, inaugurated the Mahakavi Moyinkutty Vaidyar Memorial Center for Studies and Research on Folk and Mappila Arts (SCARF) at the Vaidyar Smarakam complex. A regional centre for study of Mappila folk arts was also set up at Mogral in Kasargode district in 2009.

=== Other institutions ===
The Kerala Mappila Kala Akademi, set up in 2001, is dedicated to this genre of music in Kerala. The Akademi awards distinguished personalities from the Mappilappattu field each year, and also provides fellowships for researchers in the field. The awards are named after popular figures in the field of Mappilappattu, like Gul Mohammed, K.K. Muhammed Abdul Kareem and Qadi Mohammed.

The All Kerala Mappila Sangeetha Academy was established in 1992 and instituted the Mahakavi Moyinkutty Vaidyar Award and the M.S. Baburaj Award. It also holds annual arts festivals with emphasis on Mappila arts.

== Conclusion ==
The literature of Mappila Songs represent the aspirations of the Mappila community, its frustrations, struggles, love and affection over the ages. Littérateur M.T. Vasudevan Nair once described Mappila songs as the "cultural fountains of a bygone age". Today, increasing "cacophony" trends in newer Mappila songs and the lack of poets with a sense of imagination have attracted criticism from many corners. A large number of songs released in the last decade under the label of Mappila Songs, have been criticized for deviating from the original nature of the folk idiom and tunes (Ishals), provoking a call for a preservation of the original identity of Mappila songs.

== Books and references ==
- Mappilappattu - Padhavum Padhanavum ( Mappila songs - Study and Lessons) - Balakrishnan Vallikkunnu and Dr. Umar Tharamel, D.C. Books, 2006
- Maappilappaattinte Lokam - (The world of Mappila Songs) - V. M. Kutty, D.C. Books
- Muslingalum Kerala Samskaravum - (Muslims and Kerala Culture) - P.K. Muhammad Kunhi Thrissur, 1982
- Mahathaya Mappila Sahitya Parambaryam - (The Great Mappila literary heritage) - C.N. Ahmad Moulavi & K.K. Mohammed Abdul Kareem - 1978
- Mappilappattu - by Dr. M.N. Karasseri in Malabar ed. M.G.S. Narayanan, 1994
- Mappilappaattinte Maadhuryam - T. K. Hamza - Olive Publications, Kozhikode
- Mahakavi Moyinkutty Vaidyar Padanangal - Mahakavi Moyinkutty Vaidyar Smaraka Committee, Kondotty
- Biggest Collection Of Mappila Songs over Web http://mappilapattukal.com/

== See also ==
- Mappila
- Arabi Malayalam
- Majlisunnor
- Vadakkan Pattukal
- Duff Muttu
- Oppana
- Kuthu Ratheeb
- Arts of Kerala
- Muhyidheen Mala at Wikisource Malayalam
