= Guruvayur Devaswom Board =

Temple governance body in Kerala, India

Guruvayur Devaswom Managing Committee
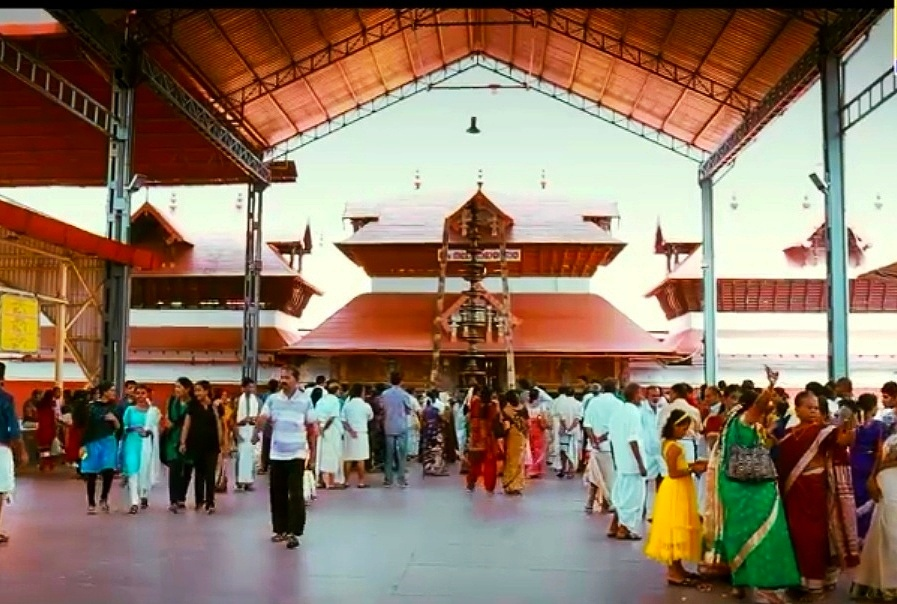
- Guruvayur, Guruvayur PO , Thrissur ,Kerala , India
- Formation: 18 March 1978
- Type: Government Constituted Managing committee
- Headquarters: Guruvayur, Thrissur district
- Location: Guruvayur
- Region served: Kerala
- Commissioner: Sri M.G. Rajamanickam IAS
- Chairman: Sri
- Administrator & Secretary ( Chief Executive Officer ): Sri Harigopal S
- CF&AO: Sri Sajith K P
- Website: guruvayurdevaswom.in

Guruvayur Devaswom is a Statutory and Independent body created for the governing and management of 12 temples in Kerala assigned to it. With the passing of Madras Regulation Act in the year 1817, temples were brought under the control of East India Company, a corporate organisation. The concept of temple included its premises and wealth. However, from 1925, temples were brought under government control with the passing of State Religious and Charitable Endowments Act. Under this Act, the state governments exercised power for the formation of Temple Development Boards for major temples with the members from local city.

== History and Objective ==
Guruvayur Devaswom manages around 12 temples including Guruvayur Temple, Guruvayur, in Kerala. Till Pre-British era temple management was with local members of town. Temple was a place of many cultural activities and social development place wish rest houses, cow dwelling places, and community halls. Temple Development Boards for many temples in India are created for the maintenance and governing of the affairs of temple. Post Independence, temples were brought under the administration of State Governments with the Guruvayoor Devasom Act, 1978.

== Composition ==
Guruvayur. Devaswom Managing committee includes chairman, Members and Administrator appointed by State Government.

Guruvayur Devaswom is headed by its Chairman Dr VK Vijayan.

== Roles and Responsibilities ==
Guruvayur Devaswom is formed for following roles and responsibilities:

- Ensuring performance of rituals.
- Ensuring accounting of collections.
- Development and maintenance of temples in other towns.
- Ensuring security of the temple property.
- Ensuring welfare of pilgrims.
- Look after welfare of staff.
- Hygiene preparation of Prasad.
- Road Maintenance and drinking water supply in premises.
