= Iringaprom =

- Census town
- Location in Kerala, India
- Coordinates: 10°36′0″N 76°3′0″E
- Country: India
- State: Kerala
- District: Thrissur

Population (2001)
  - Total: 8,535

Languages
  - Official: Malayalam, English
- Time zone: UTC+5:30 (IST)

Iringaprom is a census town in Thrissur district in the Indian state of Kerala.

== Demographics ==
As of 2001 India census, Iringaprom had a population of 8535. Males constitute 47% of the population and females 53%. Iringaprom has an average literacy rate of 84%, higher than the national average of 59.5%: male literacy is 85%, and female literacy is 83%. In Iringaprom, 12% of the population is under 6 years of age.

The languages spoken are Malayalam and English. Its pin code is 680103.
