= Ahwan Sebastian =

Playwright and stage director

Ahwan Sebastian

Ahwan Sebastian (c. 1927 - 2 March 2011) was a playwright, director, music director and actor in Malayalam.

== Career ==
He directed six stage plays, and has given music to more than twenty plays and two films (Love Marriage and Karutha Pennu). He has also scripted and directed a film Kalopasana (1981). He is best known as the writer and director of the stage play Devasutram which ran in Kerala theatres for many years. Other notable scripts include Upasana, Brahmasuran, Chooshakamanthram and Anaswaramanthram. His last play, Kabandhangal, was released in 1984. He established his own professional drama group called "Musical Theatres" in 1958. He died on 2 March 2011 in Kozhikode at the age of 77.
