= Vilayil Faseela =

Indian singer (1959/1960 – 2023)

- Born: Vilayil Valsala; Vilayil, Malappuram, Kerala, India
- Died: 12 August 2023 Velliparamba, Kozhikode, Kerala, India
- Genre: Mappila songs
- Occupation: Singer
- Years active: 1974–2023

Vilayil Faseela (born Vilayil Valsala; 1959/1960 – 12 August 2023) was an Indian Mappila songs singer from Kerala. With a career spanning over four decades, Faseela sang more than 5000 songs in this genre. Hailing from Vilayil in Ernad, Malappuram district, Kerala, Faseela began her journey into Mappila songs in the early 1970s when she was still in the fifth standard. The late 1980s stood out as a golden period for Faseela. Faseela's collaborations with singer V. M. Kutty were widely appreciated. She converted to Islam and changed her name from Valsala to Faseela Mohammedali after marriage. Faseela died in Calicut, Kerala on 12 August 2023, at the age of 63.

== Career & Life ==
She is the daughter of Kelan and Cherupennu, born as Valsala was born in Vilayil in Cheekode panchayat of Eranad taluk of Malappuram district. Her husband, late TK Muhammadali, has three children named Fayad, Ali, and Fahima. She sang many hit songs. Kirikiri Cheripummal Ananjulla Putunari, Amina Bivikomana Mon, on the night of Hajj, I saw the Kaaba Kinaw, Makkah became Rajati. The main songs are Muthilum Mutholi, Kadalinakare Vannore Khalbukal Venthu Pukanjore, aakaloka Karana Mutholi, Samad Daktenente Ane Madapoo, Kanneeril Mungi, Mani Manchal, and others.

== Awards ==
- Lifetime Achievement Award instituted by Kerala Mapila Kala Academy
