= Moyinkutty Vaidyar =

Indian poet

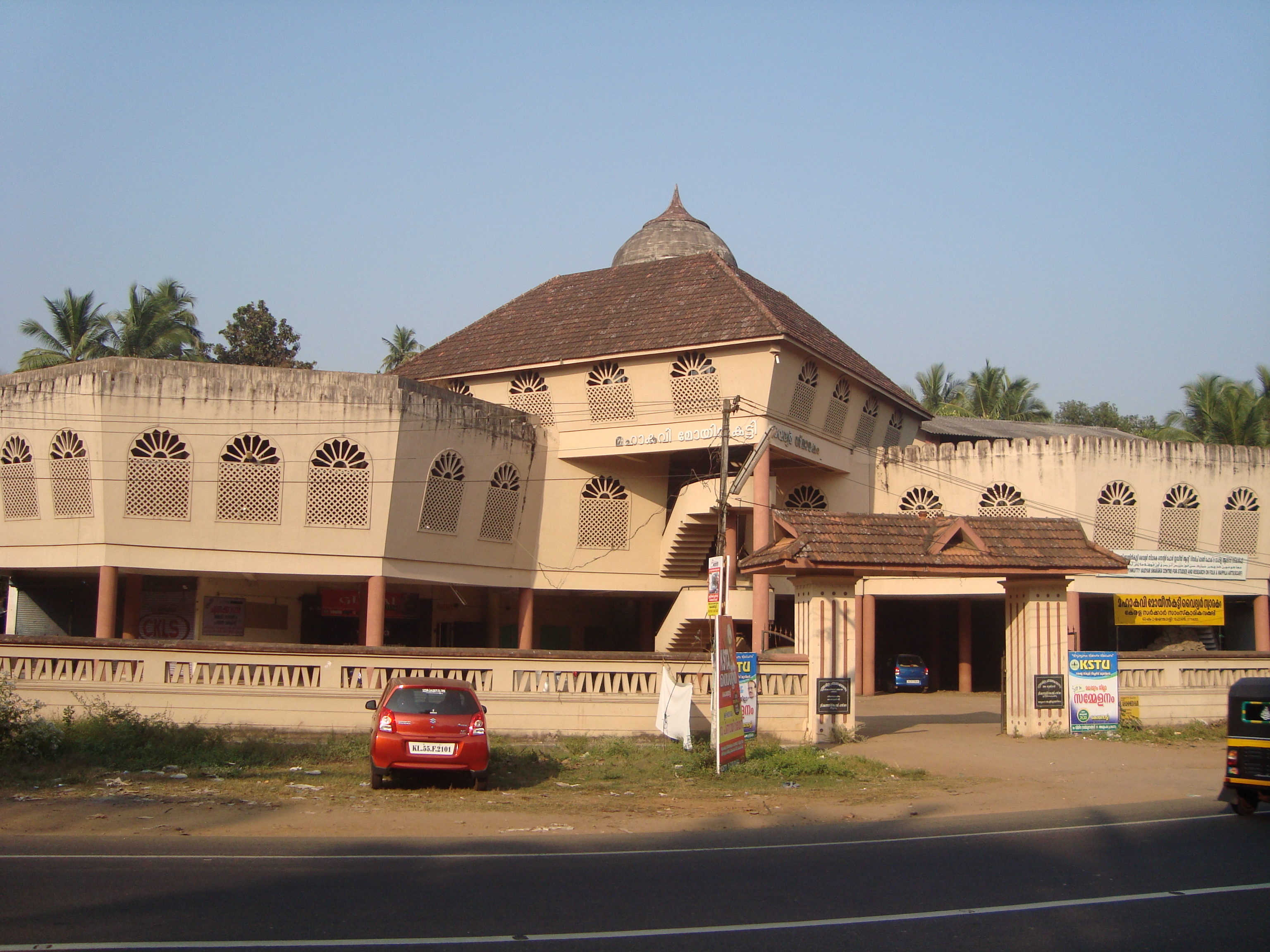
Mahakavi Moyinkutty Vaidyar Smarakam (Memorial) at the poet's birthplace in Kondotty in Malappuram district, Kerala.

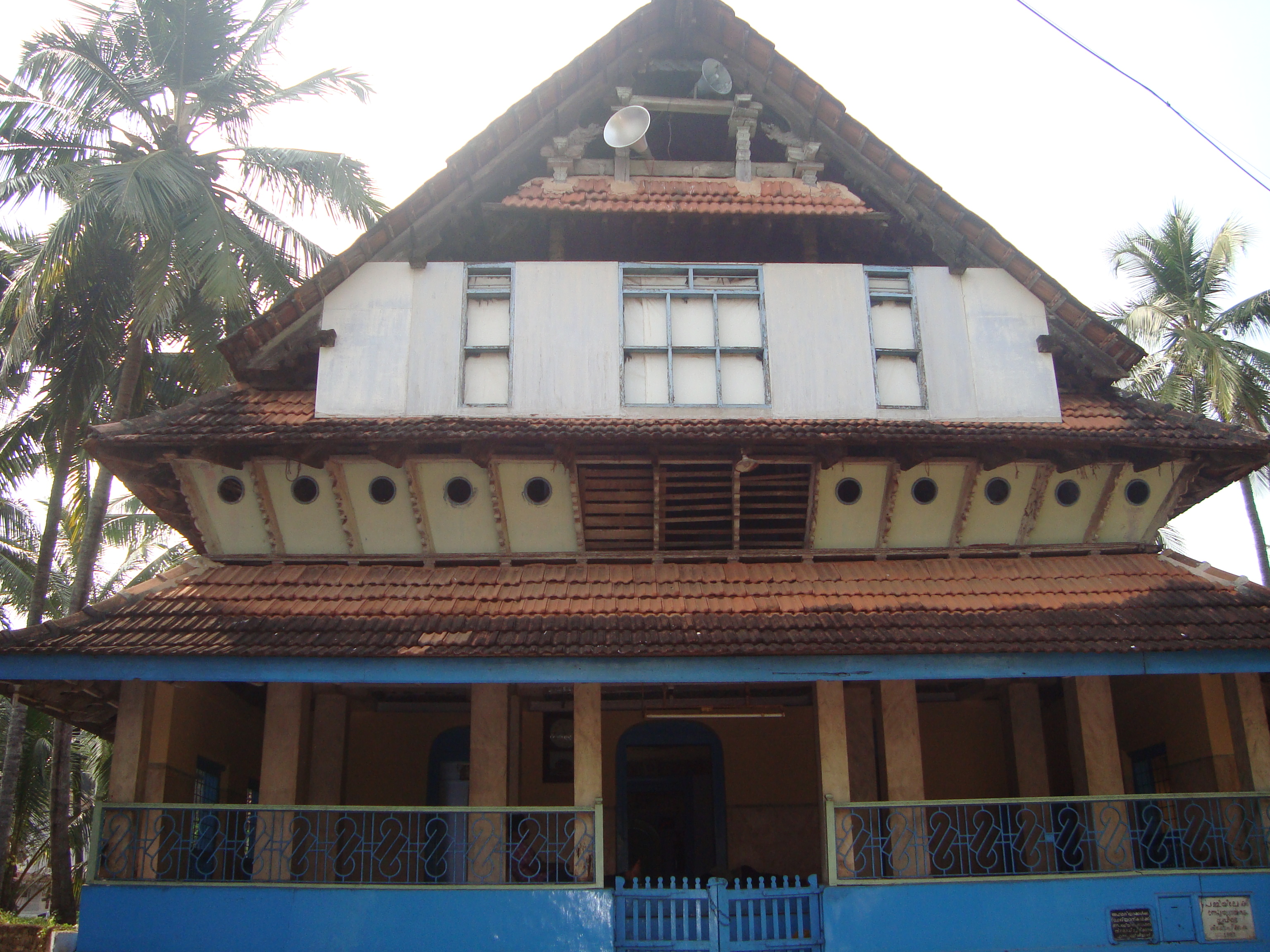
Muchundi Mosque (Muchundipalli), Kuttichira, Kozhikode where Moyinkutty Vaidyar camped when compiling some of his works.

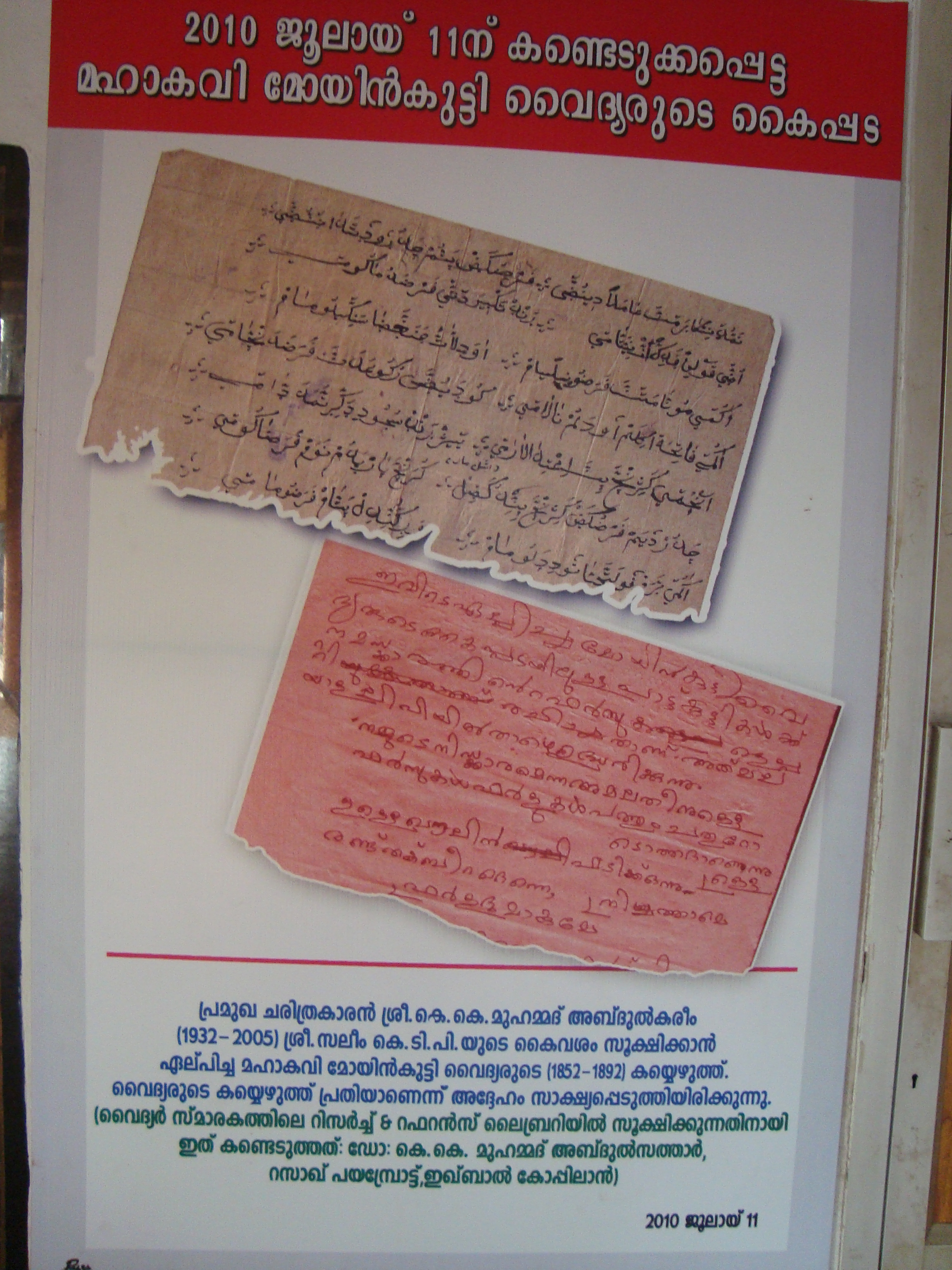
Handwritten copies of Vaidyar's works on display at the Vaidyar Smarakam at Kondotty.

Hakim Muheen, Officially known as Moyinkutty Vaidyar or Doctor Moyin Kutty (1852–1892), often referred to as Mahakavi (great poet), is historically considered one of the most renowned poets of the Mappila pattu genre of Malayalam language.

== Personal life ==
Moyinkutty was born to Unni Mammad and Kunjamina in 1852 at Ottuparakkuzhi, near Kondotti in Malappuram district. Unni Mammad was famous practitioner of Ayurvedic medicine and a poet too. He lived longer than his son and completed his unfinished work titled Hijra from the 27th Ishal onwards. Moyinkutty continued his family tradition of Ayurvedic medical practice and learnt Sanskrit and Arabic languages. He died at the age of 40 in 1892 leaving behind his wife, two sons and a daughter. No known photograph or painting of the poet exists today and none of his descendants survived after his children.

== Early works ==
At a very young age of seventeen, he composed the romantic epic Badarul Munir – Husnul Jamal (1872). It narrates a fictional love story between Prince Badarul Muneer, the son of the King Mahazin of Ajmeer and Husnul Jamal, daughter of his minister Mazmir. Most of the events narrated are pure fantasy, with plots involving the transformation of the hero into a bird and back, and frequent interactions with Jinns.

== Padappattu ==
Later works by the poet followed a very different pattern. These works were essentially war songs in nature. The Badar Padappattu and Malappuram Padappatt are the most popular songs of this genre.

=== Badar Padappattu ===
Shabvathul Badarul Kubra, more popularly known as the Badar Padappattu is considered one of the finest compositions of Mappilappattu. It narrates the tale of the Battle of Badr by Prophet Muhammed and his companions.

=== Malappuram Padappattu ===
The Malappuram Padappattu (1883), also known as the Madhinidhi Mala describes the undercurrents of peasant life and struggles in Malappuram in the 18th and 19th centuries. In 1763, a local landlord named Para Nambi had a dispute with one of his officers named Ali Marakkar. The dispute escalated to a major battle between the landlord's men and the Mappilas and the lower caste Hindus amongst the tenants. 44 Mappilas and a lower caste Hindu of the Thattaan (goldsmith) caste lost their lives in the battle. They were eulogised later by the Mappilas. Some time later, the Nambi felt remorse at his deed and decided to make up with the Mappilas. This was the theme of the Malappuram Padappattu. The work was composed with 68 ishals, four vambus and a kuthirachaattam. It also makes references to the story of the King Cheraman Perumal who is said to have journeyed to Makkah and converted to Islam.

== Other works ==
Other major works of the poet include:

- Salaseel
- Elippada (The battle of the rats, based on a Panchatantra tale )
- Ottakathinteyum maaninteyum katha ( The story of the camel and the deer)
- Bethilappattu (songs which appreciate the advantages of using betel leaf, the customs and folkways associated).
- Hijra
- Kilathimala
- Moolapuranam
- Uhad Padappattu (tells the legendary story of Uhud war)
- Theevandichinth
- Swaleeqath
- Mullappoocholayil
- Karamath Mala

== Style ==
The songs of Moyinkutty Vaidyar are distinguished by their depth of imagination, the beauty of the metaphors used, the creativity comparisons involved and the variety of their ishals (tunes/modes). His poems depicted the emotional manifestation of Muslims of the day, using literary forms such as romanticism, devotionalism and social realism. The vivid portrayal of the movements of the horses in the battlefield in Vaidyar's Badar Padappattu is a particular example of the poet's style. The galloping of the stallions, their hoof-falls, their lightning speed, the tails fluttering and flying in the wind, the excitement of the riders pulling the bridle and the horses rearing up – together provide the reader a very peculiar effect.

The poems are also notable for the hybrid language of Arabi Malayalam, Sanskrit and at times full sentences in pure Arabic.

== Legacy ==
In 1999, then Chief Minister of Kerala, E. K. Nayanar inaugurated the Maha Kavi Moyinkutty Vaidyar Smarakam at the poet's birthplace in Kondotty as a cultural centre to attract research into the annotations of Badar pattu, and its studies and interpretations in Malayalam. The centre runs certificate courses in Mappilappattu and Mappila kali. It also has a folklore study centre, reference library and a historical museum attached to it. Each year it conducts the Vaidyar Mahotsavam, a two or three-day festival that includes cultural and literary programmes related to all Mappila art forms. The Vaidyar Memorial Lecture is also delivered during the festival.

In 2005, a two volume compilation of his works were released as a book Mahakavi Moyinkutty Vaidyar, Sampoorna Krithikal by the Kondotty based Mahakavi Moyinkutty Vaidyar Smaraka Samithi under the aegis of the Culture Department, Government of Kerala. The songs were compiled by historians K.K. Mohammed Kareem and K. Abubacker.

In 2010, a biographical work titled Ishal Chakravarthy Moyinkutty Vaidyar authored by Basheer Chunkathara was published by the Kerala Sahitya Akademi.

== See also ==
- Mappila songs
- Kondotty
- Maha Kavi Moyinkutty Vaidyar Smarakam, memorial cultural centre
