= Chembai =

Indian singer (1896–1974)

Chembai Vaidyanatha Bhagavatar
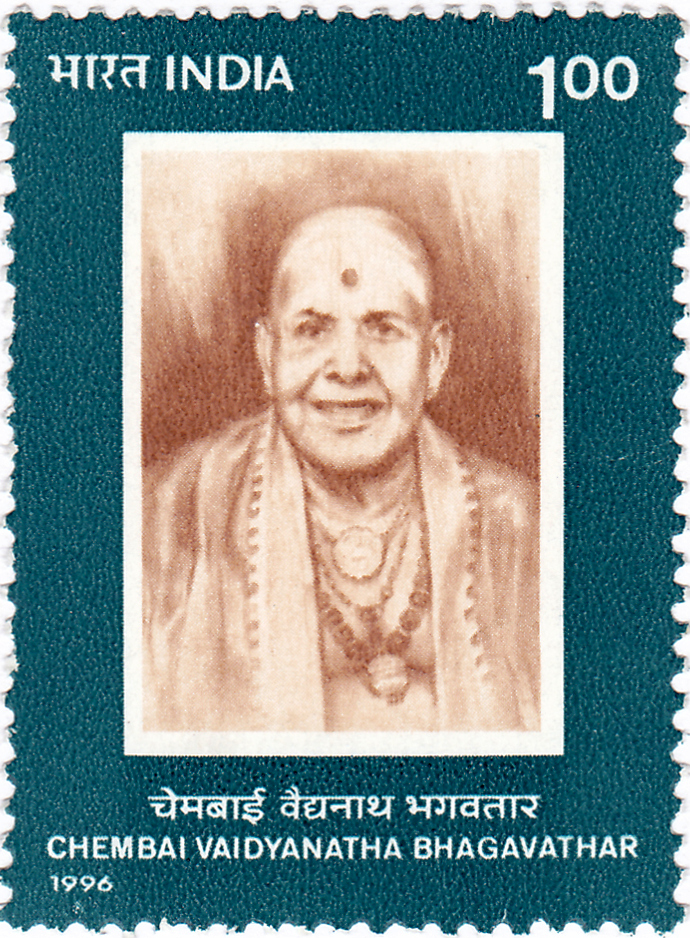
- Chembai in an Indian Stamp

Background information
- Born: Vaidyanatha Iyer; 28 August 1896; Lokanarkavu, Vatakara, Kerala, India
- Died: 16 October 1974 (aged 78) Ottapalam, Palakkad, Kerala, India
- Genre: Carnatic Music
- Occupation: Singer
- Years active: 1904–1974
- Labels: His Master's Voice, Inreco, BMG, Vani Cassettes
- Website: chembai.com

Chembai Vaidyanatha Bhagavatar (born Vaidyanatha Iyer, 28 August 1896 – 16 October 1974) was an Indian Carnatic music singer from Kerala. He was born in Vatakara, Kerala, and moved to Palakkad kottayi along with his family during his childhood. He is popularly known as Chembai, or sometimes simply as Bhagavatar. Chembai was noted for his powerful voice and majestic style of singing. His first public performance was in 1904, when he was nine. A recipient of several titles and honours (including the Madras Music Academy's Sangeetha Kalanidhi in 1951), he was known for his encouragement of upcoming musicians and ability to spot new talent. He was responsible for popularising compositions like Rakshamam Saranagatam and Pavana Guru, among others.

The music critic 'Aeolus' described him as "the musician who has meant the most to Carnatic Music in the first fifty years of the 20th century." His prominent disciples include Chembai Narayana Bhagavathar, Mangu Thampuran, Guruvayur Ponnammal, T. V. Gopalakrishnan, V. V. Subramaniam, P. Leela, K. G. Jayan, K. G. Vijayan, K. J. Yesudas, Kudumaru Venkataraman and Babu Parameswaran, among others. He also mentored many young accompanists, including Palghat Mani Iyer, Lalgudi Jayaraman, M. S. Gopalakrishnan, T. N. Krishnan, Palani Subramaniam Pillai and L. Subramaniam. Memorial music festivals have been held in his honour annually since his death in 1974, the most important being the annually celebrated Chembai Sangeetholsavam.

== Early life ==
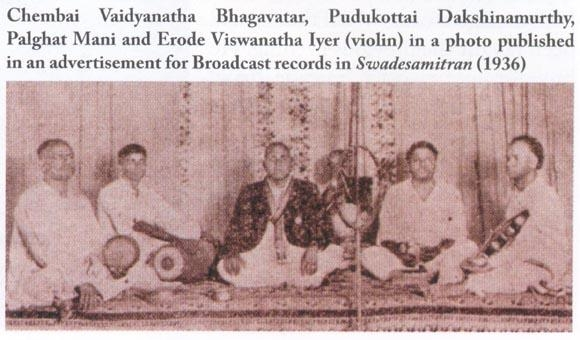

Chembai was born to Anantha Bhagavatar and Parvati Ammal on 28 August 1896, into a Tamil Brahmin family in Perakkool Madom, adjacent to Lokanarkavu, Vatakara in Kozhikode, on Janmashtami day. He lived here until he was five years old when the family moved to Palakkad.

The family's connection with classical music spans five centuries. Vaidyanatha Bhagavatar's father, Anantha Bhagavatar, was a violinist and singer from Chembai, near Palakkad, to whom a local Maharaja awarded the title "Ghana Chakratanam", indicating his mastery of a special closed-mouth style of singing tanam. At age 3, Chembai began to learn Carnatic music from his father in the customary guru-sishya tradition, and also began violin and flute training in 1912. Chembai is also one of 12 names of Sirkazhi, the birthplace of Saint Gnanasambandar 7th century CE in Tamil Nadu.

== Singing career ==
In 1952, Chembai reportedly lost his voice and was unable to chant the name of his favourite deity, Guruvayurappan. According to documented accounts, he subsequently underwent an 18-day course of Ayurvedic treatment at Pulamanthole in Kerala under the Ashtavaidya Pulamanthole Mooss tradition. Following the treatment, he experienced a marked improvement in his voice and resumed singing performances with renewed vigour. Historical accounts further state that thereafter he donated a substantial portion of his earnings to the Guruvayur Temple.

=== Release of recordings ===
Chembai has many phonograph recordings to his credit, recorded from 1932 to 1946. Those were the days before the advent of the concert microphone, and a singer was entirely dependent on the timbre and reach of his voice for a successful concert. Chembai had a voice of great depth. Further, the perception that Chembai's repertoire of songs was limited is highly incorrect. The number of different compositions he recorded is in the hundreds (let alone the total number he performed in concerts and on radio during his career).

=== Lalita Dasar Kritis (1945) ===
Chembai's old friend, T. G. Krishna Iyer, from Tripunithura, had settled in Madras (now Chennai) and offered a house to Chembai on Palace Road near Santhome. He had composed some 155 kritis in Telugu, Malayalam, Tamil and Sanskrit under the mudra 'Lalita dasar' and requested Chembai to popularise them. Chembai set the kritis to classical music and got them published under the name Lalita Dasar Keertanaigal. He made it a practice to sing these kritis in most of his concerts. He also released a record containing selected kritis from Lalita Dasar's kritis like Evariki Telusunamma (Dhanyasi), Ennil Kaninda (Shankarabharanam), Pavana Guru (Hamsanandi), Varijadala Lochani (Arabhi), among others.

=== Performing ability and style ===
Chembai had a powerful and resonant voice, and was known for singing in a clear, open-throated style. He demonstrated strong command of kala pramana (time measure) and was capable of performing niraval and swaraprastara from any given point in a composition, showing his mental alertness during concerts. His empathy for his accompanists and disciples was noteworthy, and he would actively encourage them. Chembai has given emotional depth to his rendition of the kriti Ksheera Saagara, depicting the mind of Tyagaraja in the phraseTarakanama.

Other stalwarts have admired the strengths of Chembai's singing. For instance, upon witnessing that Chembai was able to sing three major concerts in a single day, G. N. Balasubramaniam is said to have remarked "These are not ordinary men. These are the Asuras of the music field. If I sing one concert, I need to rest the whole of next day". Legendary percussionist Pudukkottai Dakshinamurthy Pillai would call him "Laya Brahma" for his impeccable grasp of tala and laya. K. V. Narayanaswamy has also remarked on Chembai's ability to hold notes aligned perfectly to sruti for extended intervals of time.

=== Disciples ===
Chembai had many students, including K. J. Yesudas and many noted musicians like T. V. Gopalakrishnan, P. Leela, and the Jaya-Vijaya twins, Kudumaru Venkataraman, Paramasivan Bhagavathar and others.

== Death ==
Chembai died suddenly on 16 October 1974, aged 78, of a cardiac arrest. Shortly before that, he performed his last concert at Poozhikunnu Sri Krishna temple in Ottapalam (the venue of his first concert), and concluded the concert with his favourite song "Karuna Cheyvan Enthu Thamasam Krishna?" (Why is there so much delay in conferring your mercy, Krishna?). He was talking to his disciple Olappamanna Vasudevan Namboothiripad when he suddenly collapsed and died. His nephew said he had always spoken about an easy death, and had attained it. He was cremated in his birth village. He was survived by his wife and daughter, both of them who died later. The government music college in Palakkad was renamed to Chembai Memorial Government Music College in his memory.

== Awards and titles ==
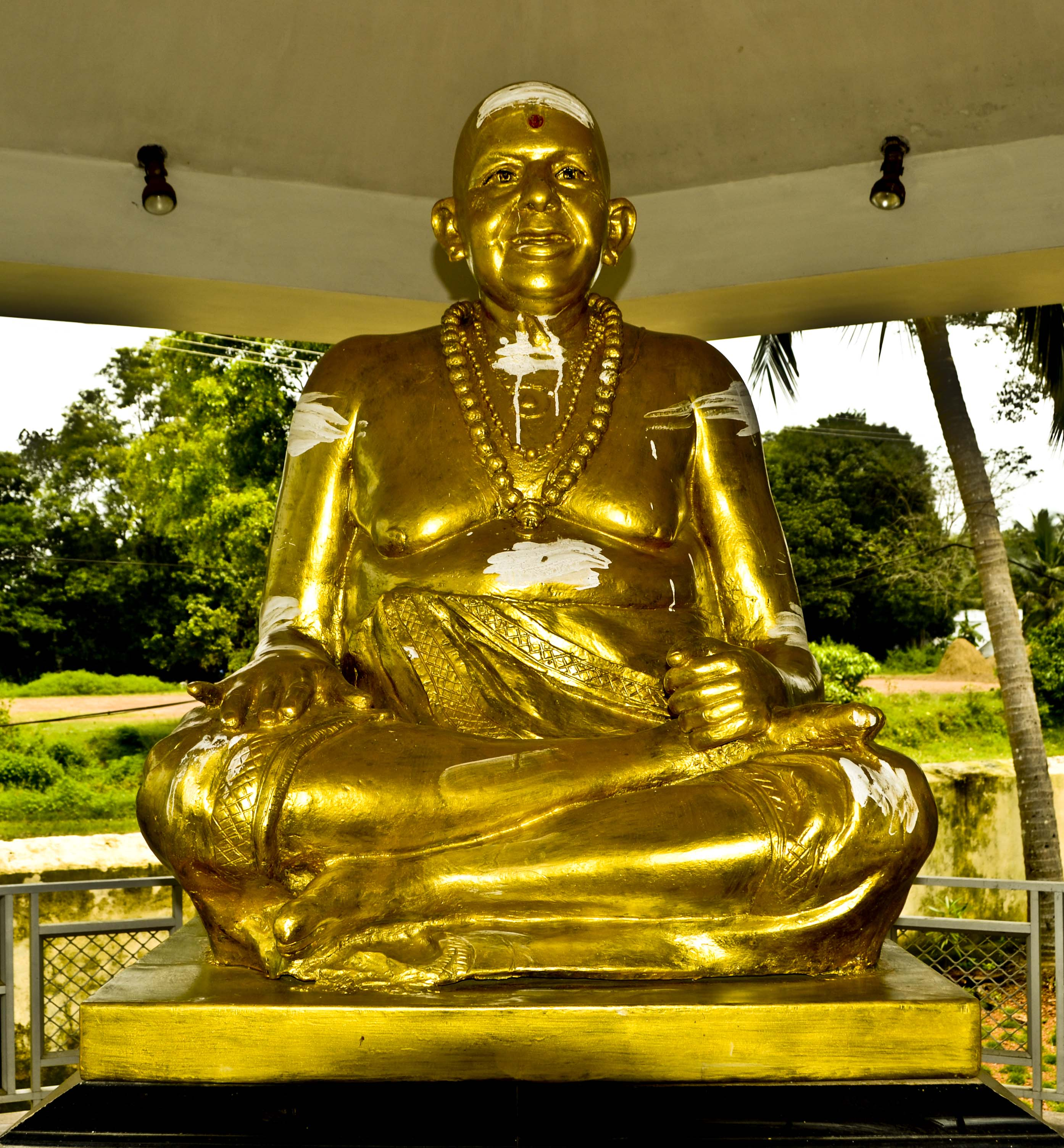
Chembai statue in Kerala

Chembai received several awards and titles during his career, most notably including:

- "Gayana Gandharva" (a title bestowed by Kalki Krishnamurthy in 1940)
- Sangeetha Kalanidhi (1951; highest accolade in Carnatic music)
- Sangeet Natak Akademi Award (1958)
- Sangeetha Kalasikhamani (1964; by The Fine Arts Society, Chennai)
- Kerala Sangeetha Nataka Akademi Fellowship (1972)
- Padma Bhushan (1973) – The Padma Bhushan is a national award bestowed by the President of India on select musicians and other eminent people. Chembai was selected to receive the award in 1973 from the then president V. V. Giri.
- The Department of Posts, Govt of India released a special issue stamp in Chembai's birth centenary year (1996).

== Music festivals ==
Chembai had been conducting a music festival in his native village from 1924 onwards. This was continued by his family and now by Chembai Sreenivasan and Chembai Suresh (C. A. Subramanian). The concert, called Chembai Ekadasi Music Festival, is held annually in February–March. Chembai also held a music festival on Guruvayur Ekadasi Day (mid-November) at Guruvayur every year. This festival, now called Chembai Sangeetholsavam in his honour, is officially conducted by the Guruvayur Devaswom Board.

== Guruvayurappan Chembai Puraskaram ==
The Sri Guvayurappan Chembai Puraskaram, awarded by Sree Krishna Temple, Guruvayur, is instituted in Chembai's memory of the late Chembai Vaidyanatha Bhagavathar. This award, comprising a cash prize of INR 50,001, a gold locket of Sree Guruvayurappan, a citation and ponnadai (a shawl adorned around the shoulders of a dignitary who is being honored), is usually presented during the annual Chembai Music Festival.

The recipients of the Chembai puraskaram include:

- Saxophonist Kadri Gopalnath (2013)
- Carnatic musician Trichur V. Ramachandran
- Veena maestro A. Ananthapadmanabhan (2011)
- Carnatic musician K. G. Jayan (2010)
- Carnatic vocalist Parassala Ponnammal (2009)
- Mridangam maestro Mavelikkara Velukkutty Nair (2008)
- Carnatic vocalist M. Balamuralikrishna (2007)
- Violin maestro M. S. Gopalakrishnan (2006)
- Carnatic musician and mridangam maestro T. V. Gopalakrishnan (2005)

== See also ==
- Carnatic music
- List of Carnatic singers
