= Perumal =

South Indian synonym for a king or ruler

Perumal (Malayalam: പെരുമാൾ; Tamil: பெருமாள்; literally meaning "the Great Person") is the name of a Hindu deity (see Perumal). The term was also commonly used in medieval south India as a synonym for a king or ruler.

Several rulers are explicitly referred to as "Perumal" in historical inscriptions. These include Sripurusha, Rachamalla, and Neetimarga of the Western Ganga dynasty; Maran Chadayan of the Pandya dynasty; Parantaka of the Chola dynasty; and Paramesvara Varma II of Kanchi from the Pallava dynasty. Among the Chera rulers, notable figures bearing the title Cheraman Perumal are Rama Rajasekhara (also known as Cheraman Perumal the Nayanar) and Sthanu Ravi (identified with Kulasekhara the Alvar).
