= Rifaʽi Ratib =

Spiritual ritual

Rifaʽi Ratib (also Rifaʽi raatheeb, Hadra rifaʽiyya) is a spiritual mortification ritual performed by followers of the Rifa’i Tariqa.

Byths or Ratheebs are sung during the ritual. There are more than twenty different byths being used. The daf is the main musical instrument used in Rifa’i Ratib. During heightened states of Rifaʽi Ratib, Rifaʽi followers were noted to have eaten live snakes, entered ovens filled with fire and ridden on lions. Followers have been seen thrusting iron spikes and glass into their bodies.

The ritual consists of acts like piercing parts of one's own body like the tongue, the ear, and the stomach with knives and sharp-edged steel tools. The followers and protagonists of the ritual believe, that even though injuries are inflicted on the bodies of the performers by weapons, these do not cause pain or damage to the body. According to many masters of the Rifaʽi sufi order, They believe that, since the ritual is performed by devotees who have received "ijazath" (permission) from their "sheikh" (saint), it will not cause injuries.
