= K. G. Jayan =

Indian singer, musician and composer (1934–2024)

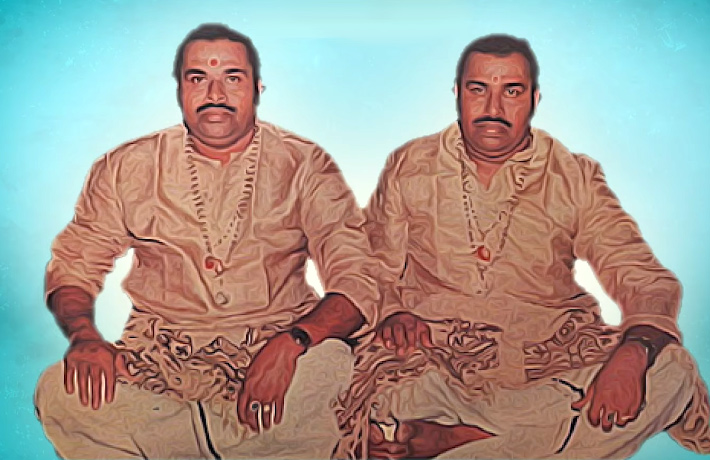
- K. G. Jayan with his brother K. G. Vijayan

Background information
- Born: Kadampoothramadam Gopalan Jayan; 21 November 1934; Kottayam, Travancore, British India
- Died: 16 April 2024 (aged 89) Tripunithura, Kerala, India
- Genre: Carnatic music
- Occupation: Singer
- Years active: 1943–2024
- Label: HMV

Kadampoothramadam Gopalan Jayan (21 November 1934 – 16 April 2024) was an Indian Carnatic singer, musician, and music director from Kerala. Known for his devotional songs, Jayan composed more than 1,000 songs for Tamil and Malayalam films. He was awarded the Padma Shri in 2019, the fourth highest civilian award in India.

== Early life ==
Jayan and his twin brother K. G. Vijayan, with whom he formed the famous Jaya-Vijaya team, were born into the Kadampoothramadam family as the third and fourth sons of late Gopalan Thanthrikal and late Narayani Amma on 21 November 1934 at their home in Kottayam. They started to learn Carnatic music at a very young age, and had their arangettam at Kumaranalloor Devi Temple at the age of nine. Their first guru was Raman Bhagavathar, and then they learnt from Mavelikkara Radhakrishna Iyer. They underwent a Ganabhooshanam course at the famous Swathi Thirunal College of Music at Thiruvananthapuram after their schooling, and passed with distinction. Later, they had their advanced training from Carnatic giants like Alathur Brothers, Chembai Vaidyanatha Bhagavathar and M. Balamuralikrishna. It was during their lessons under Chembai that they started composing and singing songs.

== Personal life ==
Jayan was married to Sarojini, a school teacher by profession. They had two sons - Biju K. Jayan and Manoj K. Jayan. Biju, the elder son, followed in his father's footsteps and became a musician, while Manoj, the younger son, became a well-known actor. K. G. Jayan died at his residence in Tripunithura, on 16 April 2024, at the age of 89.

== Awards ==
- 1991 – Kerala Sangeetha Nataka Akademi Award – Government of Kerala
- 2013 – Harivarasanam Award – Government of Kerala and Travancore Devaswom Board
- 2019 – Padma Shri – Government of India

== See also ==
- List of Padma Shri award recipients (2010–2019)
