= List of surnames from Kerala =

Titles of the families from Kerala state India

The titles are given to certain individual of families in Kerala

- Nambudiri - Malayali elite Brahmin surname.
- Nair - Upper caste surname, encompassing several subcastes which includes High ranking martial castes like Pillai, Kurup, Unnithan, Menon, Nambiar, etc that formed the aristocracy and elite of traditional Kerala, which is also used by auxiliary, intermediate and middle-caste Nairs like Padamangalam Nair, Pallichan Nair, Vaniya Nair.
- Varma - The surname of royal Nairs, notably kings, varies depending on the specific monarchy.
- Pillai - The Pillai surname is often associated with Nairs who are feudal Lords, royals, and warriors.
- Kurup - The surname "Kurup" among the Nairs often indicates individuals who are Naduvazhi or landlords and are recognized as brave warriors.
- Adiyodi - Samantan Nair clan of North Malabar
- Unnithan - A group of Nairs belonging to the baronial class.
- Nayanar - The Nair surname associated with aristocracy.
- Nambiar - The Landlord class Nairs found in North Malabar.
- Thampi - The Surname associated with Nairs related to royal families.
- Menon - Aristocratic title for Nairs, who primarily function as landlords, warriors, accountants, military officers of the princely state.
- Kartha - Nairs associated with aristocracy.
- Kaimal - The Nair surname 'Kaimal' is associated with Kiriyathil Nair.
- Thirumulpad - Surname of Samantha Nairs.
- Tharakan - Surname of Hindus and Saint Thomas Christians.
- Rawther - The surname for Muslims Rowthers in Travancore.
- Panicker - The surname is associated with Nairs, Ezhavas, Thiyyas and Christian families.
- Mannadiyar - Aristocratic surnames of Kiriyathil Nairs in Palakkad district.
- Moopil Nair - Nair rulers of vassal kingdoms
- Potti - Brahmin Surname.
- Zamorin - Malabar Nair dynasty title.
- Swaroopam - Royal title of Kerala.
- Thamban - Royal Nair title.
- Chekavar - A title in North Malabar, given to the members of Thiyya Caste who are trained in Warfare and Martial Arts and are deployed as Soldiers.
- Mappila - Mappila is a surname for Travancore Syrian Christians and Muslims of Malabar.
- Moopan - All Kerala and North Malabar most commonly.
- Koya - Muslim surname in Malappuram district.
- Channar - surname associated with Ezhavas and nadars
- Cherayi Panikkar - Commander of Samoothiri Raja and title given to the Thiyya Caste in South Malabar.
- Achari - south part
- Ezhuthachan - Malappuram and Thrissur District.
- Vaidyar - title given to physicians across Kerala.
- Thandan - Title Given to Thiyya Caste Headman/chiefs across kerala.
- Nadar - Southern Kerala (Thiruvananthapuram mainly)
- Shenoy - Gaud saraswat brahmin surname
- Marakkar - Muslim title given to Naval chief of Zamorin of Calicut.
- Mannanar - Kannur dynasty.
- Poozhitharaa - Muslims surnames in Malabar and Malappuram district
