= Nilambur Kingdom =

Historical kingdom in the region of Kerala

Nilambur Kovilakam Thirumulpād Nagavanshi
- 1239-1971 (732 years)
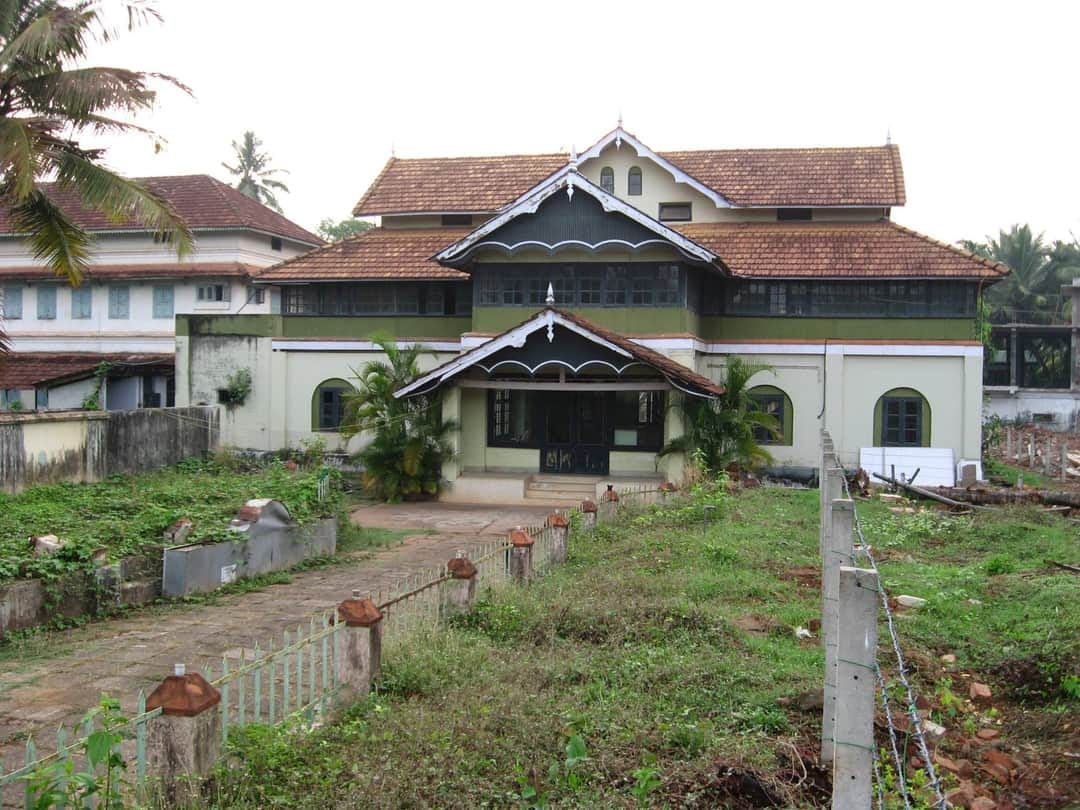
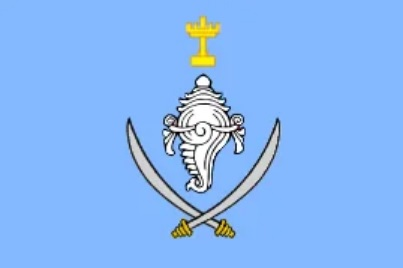
- Zamorin-Nilambur Raja Flag Ruins of Pootheri Mana Palace
- Capital: Nilambur
- Common languages: Malayalam
- Religion: Hinduism
- Government: Hereditary monarchy
- Thirumulpad, Raja
  - 1641-1678: Govindan Thirumulpād
  - 1683-1714: Sridharan Namboothiripād
  - 1721-1749: Paduthol Namboothiripād
  - 1763-1804: Krishnavarman Thampan/Kunhunni Thampan
  - 1828-1851: Manavedan Thirumulpād
  - 1854-1883: Mana Vikrama Thirumulpād/Sreekumaran Thirumulpād
  - 1896-1902: Kerala Varma Thirumulpād
  - 1904-1909: Ashtamoorthy Namboothiripād
  - 1934-1947: Balagopal Varma Puthiyaveettil
  - 1973-1989: Parameswaran Namboodiripād
  - Present (11th generation): Kerala Varma Ravi Varma
- Historical era: Age of Imperialism
  - Military expansion of the Samoothiri's kingdom: 1239
  - Vassal kings to the Samoothiri Raja: 1239-1806
  - Independent rulers of Nilambur: 1806-1947
  - The Malabar rebellion: 1921
  - Dissolvement of the kingdom: 1947
  - Confiscation of royal lands and feudal estates: 1957
  - Abolishment of Privy purse: 1971
- Currency: Panam
Succeeded by
Government of Kerala

Nilambur Kovilakam, also known as the Nilambur Kingdom, was a former vassal kingdom and royal Kovilakam situated in Nilambur, in present-day Kerala, India, near the Nilgiri range of the Western Ghats. It was ruled by Samantha Kshatriyas of the Nagavanshi clan who were the family members, relatives and representatives of the Samoothiri Raja (Zamorin) of Calicut, and served as the Naduvazhi (vassal kings) and the Jenmimar (aristocracy) of Nilambur. The Nilambur kings extended their power and authority by marrying with the Nambudiris. This practise was called Sambandam, and resulted in both Brahmins and Kshatriyas taking turns to rule over the Nilambur Kovilakam kingdom. The Brahmin rulers used the title Namboodiripād, while the Kshatriya rulers used the title Thirumulpād. To seal this marriage alliance, they jointly built several aristocratic Illams, such as the Nambudiri stronghold of Pootheri Illam (also called as Pootheri Mana or Pootheri Palace) in Feroke.

Following the collapse of the Zamorin's dynasty in 1806, the Nilambur Rajas continued to rule as independent chieftains until the 1921 Malabar Rebellion, when a group of Mappila Muslims led by Ali Musliyar and other rebels attacked Nilambur Kovilakam along with other royal families in the Malabar region. The uprising was aimed at abolishing the prevailing feudal system controlled by elite Hindus. From 1921 until India's independence in 1947, the Nilambur rulers had a diminished role in governing the land and were finally removed from power following the dissolvement of the kingdom in 1947.

== History ==
Unlike the Zamorins of Calicut, whose history has been thoroughly documented and recorded, the history of Nilambur Kovilakam remains unclear. It is known that the kingdom came into existence during the mid-13th century AD when the Samoothiri Raja, at the time the most powerful ruler in Kerala, appointed an Eradi prince from his own family to rule over his wealth and estates in nearby Nilambur, which is located about 60 kilometers from Calicut. The prince and his descendants served as vassal kings to the Zamorins, with their capital located 25 kilometers north of Manjeri in present-day Malappuram district. To prevent any possible mutiny or rebellion, the Samoothiri did not allow the Nilambur vassal kings to maintain their own armies. This caused the Nilambur Rajas to rely on their liege lord to provide soldiers in case of wars. During the 1921 Malabar Rebellion, this decision would prove fatal, as the Nilambur rulers did not have the army to prevent the uprising that would eventually lead to the downfall of the ruling house.

The area surrounding Nilambur was an ancient tribal settlement, and the remains of ancient temples can be found in the forests. The Cholanaikkans, one of the most primitive tribes in South India and one of the last remaining hunter-gatherer tribes, numbering only 360 in 1991 and first contacted in the 1960s, have been observed in the Karulai and Chunkathara forest ranges nearby.

== 1921 Malabar Rebellion ==
A dispute between the Nilambur Raja (a Namboodiri landlord) and Vadakkevittil Mohammad (a Moplah Khilafatist) in July 1921 lead to the police search of Mohammad. The situation escalated when hundreds of Moplah Muslims and Khilaftists marched towards the king's palace carrying knives, swords and other weapons. The mob was dispersed only after the intervention of the Khilafat Committee of Malappuram. During the 1921 Malabar rebellion, more than a dozen royal family members were murdered by the rioting Moplahs, causing the British officers stationed in Malappuram to intervene.

== Palace of Pootheri Mana ==
The palace of Pootheri Illam, constructed in 1917 by the rulers of Nilambur Kovilakam, was abandoned during the early 1990s and the members of the royal family dispersed to various parts of Kerala and other countries. It has been in ruins since then, and the Government of Kerala is considering its conversion into a traditional museum.

== Tradition ==
The Nilambur Rajas extended their power and authority by marrying with the Nambudiris, who were the Brahmin lords of Kerala. This practise was called Sambandam, and resulted in both Brahmins and Kshatriyas taking turns to rule over the Nilambur Kovilakam kingdom. The Brahmin rulers used the title "Namboodiripad" while the Kshatriya rulers used the title "Thirumulpād."

== Culture ==
The royal family of Nilambur Kovilkam were devout Hindus, being followers of Lord Krishna. The family-owned Vettakkorumakan Kovil (which is famous for Pattutsavam) and Nilambur Kovilakam itself are situated on the banks of the Chali river, and the region is also known for its unique teak plantations and the Teak Museum. The Nilambur–Shoranur Railway Line was built by the British Raj to carry teak, timber and other natural products from these forests to the outside world. The forests of Nilambur remain an important source of teak in India.

== Gallery ==
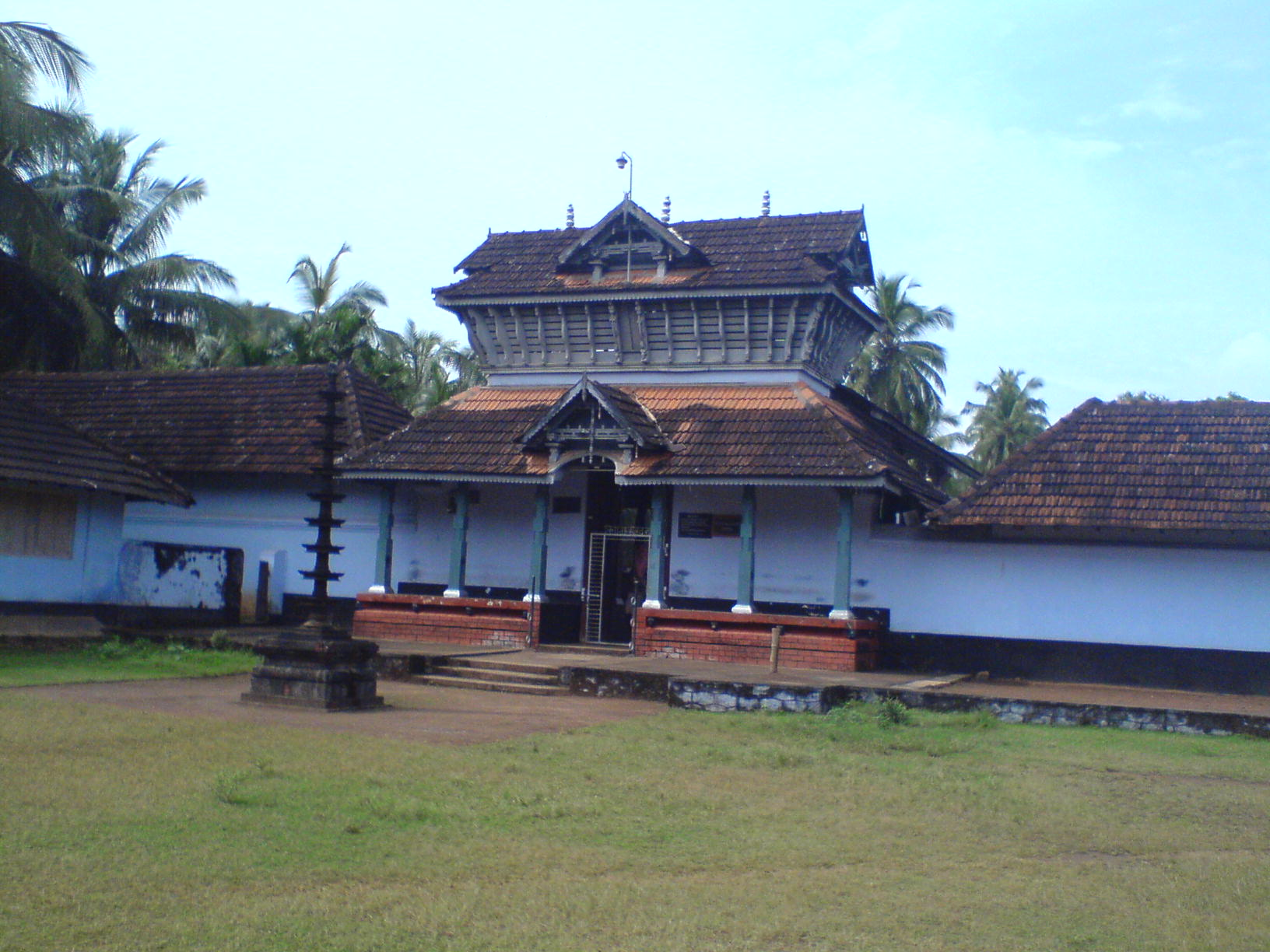
Vettakkorumakan Temple

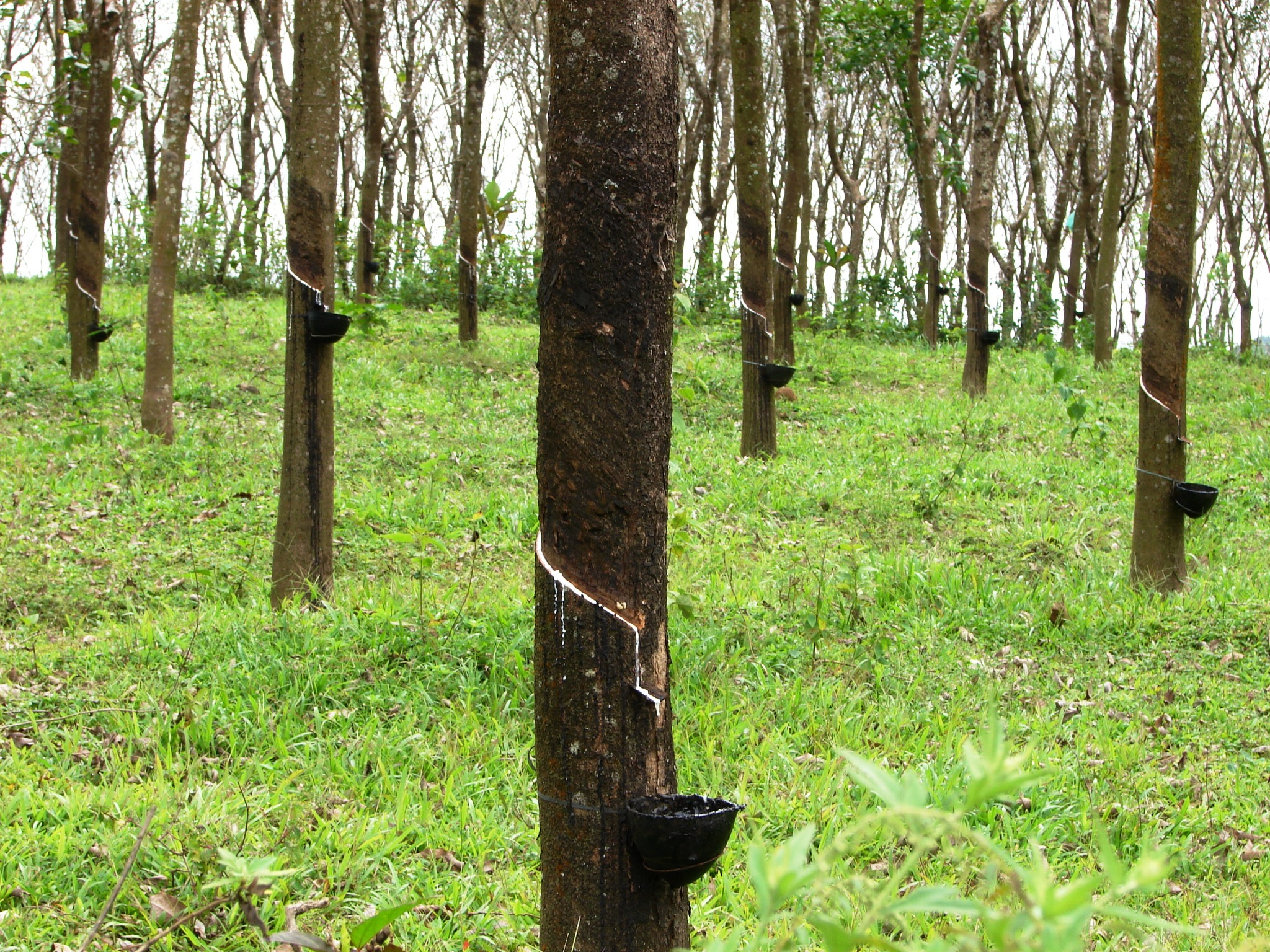
Nilambur rubber estates

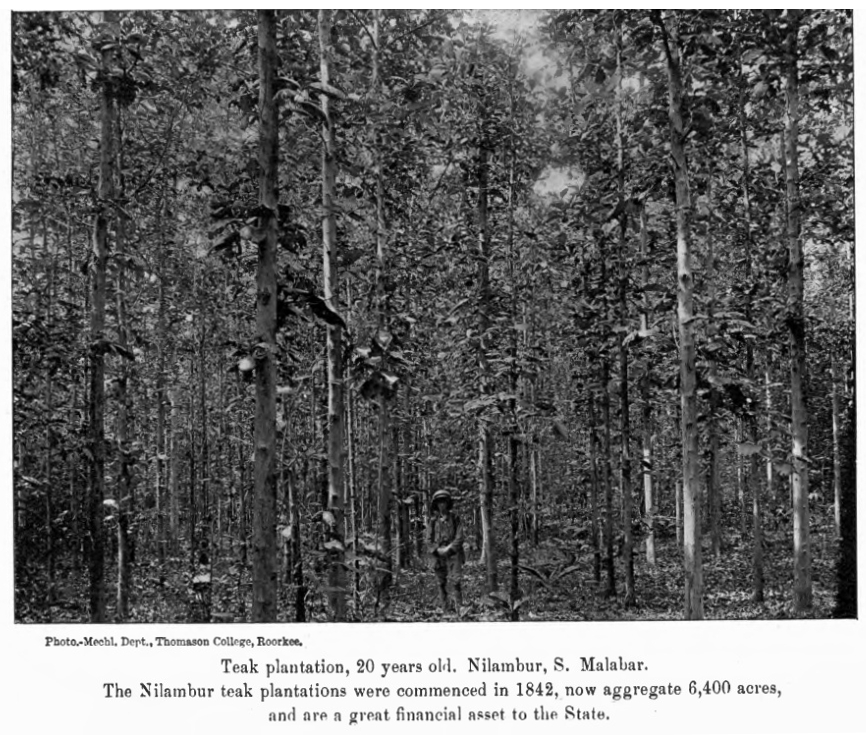
The Conolly Teak Plot, named in memory of H.V. Conolly, Malabar District Collector

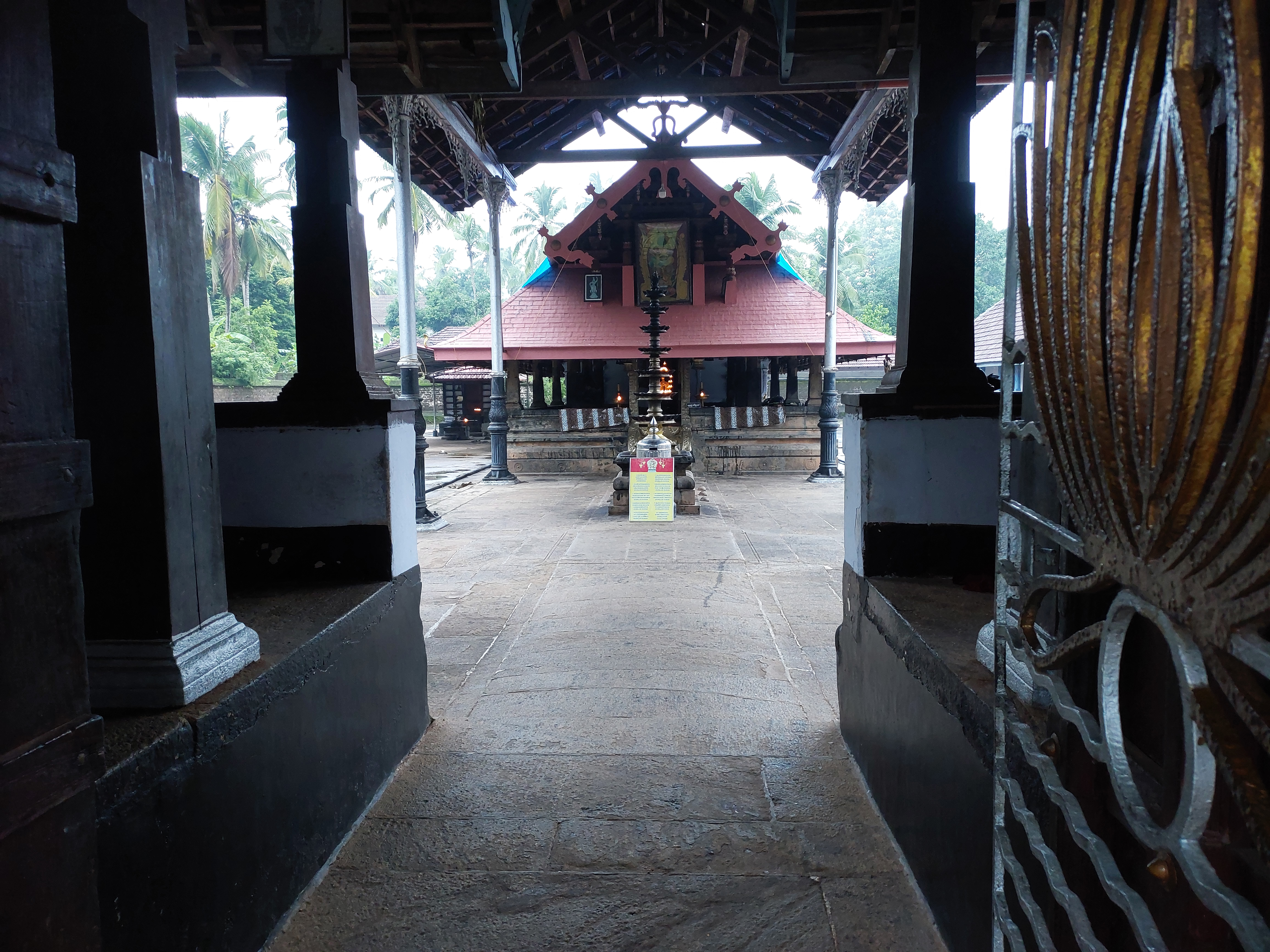
Interior of Nilambur Kovilakam temple

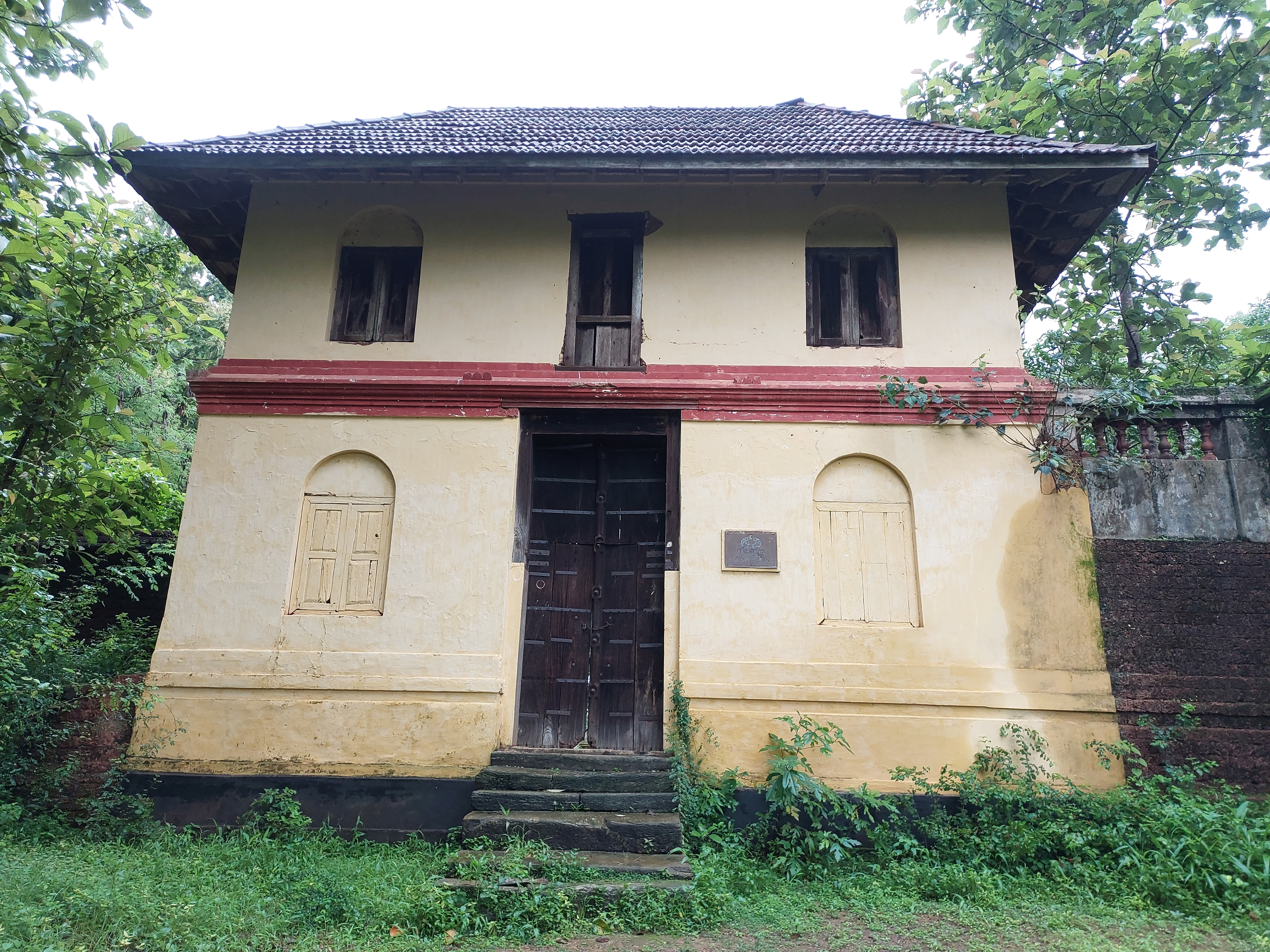
Eastern Gate of Nilambur Kovilakam

== See also ==
- Kovilakathumuri
- Amarambalam
- Adyanpara Falls
- vaniyambalam
