= Kurup (Nair caste) =

Nair title

Regions with significant populations
- Kerala

Languages
- Malayalam, Sanskrit

Religion
- Hinduism (Kshatriya)

Related ethnic groups
- Nair Pillai, Madampi, Malayali Brahmin

Kurup or Nair Kurup is a title of nobility used by Nairs in Kerala, India. They were experts in Kalaripayattu and had their own Nair armies in many parts of Kerala. Many of them were powerful warlords who also served as warriors and army generals. Additionally, a segment of the Nair Kurup caste belonged to the Jenminar (feudal chieftains) and Naduvazhi (regional rulers) in the kingdom of Venadu until the 17th century. The Nair Kurup caste is unrelated to other castes, such as the Ambalavasis or Kalari Panickers.

== Etymology ==
"Kurup" is a title of nobility among the Nairs, historically given by different kingdoms to Nair individuals or families who have reached a high level of expertise in Kalaripayattu or warfare.

Title of Travancore Kingdom

The Nair title "Kurup" is mainly divided into two types in the Travancore region.

Kurup title in early Travancore - "Kurup" is a title of nobility among Nair subcastes of old Kollam (present-day Kollam, Pathanamthitta and Alappuzha districts) and Thiruvananthapuram region, which corresponds to the Pillai, Adiyodi, Karthav, Kaimal titles. They were mainly warrior class, who expertise in Kalaripayattu and second ranking Nobles who represented the mainstream Hindu Nair community. These class of Nairs ranked above traditional Nair caste but below the king in caste hierarchy of Kerala.

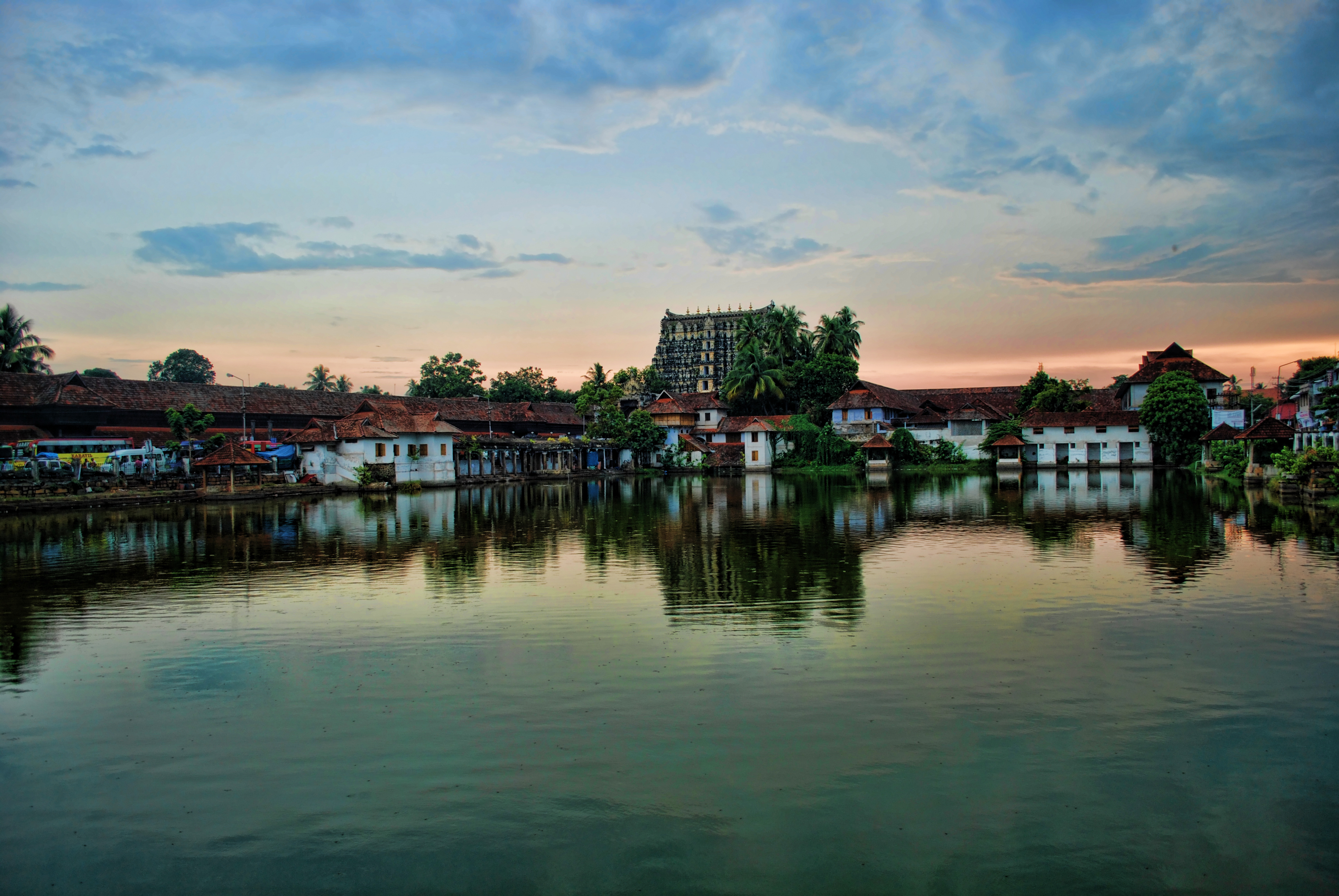
Padmanabhaswamy Temple, The temple associated with Ettara Yogam

Well-known Kurups of early Travancore include Azhakath Kurup, a Nair noble man who represented Nairs in the Ettara Yogam or the King and Council of Eight, the longstanding administrative setup of the Sri Padmanabhaswamy Temple for centuries. They belong to the highest Nair subcaste of Travancore, the Illathu Nair.

Kurup title in later Travancore - The power of Kurup reduced after the formation of Travancore kingdom, Kurup title was later given to the High Steward of Travancore (Great officers of Travancore). They belong to the swaroopathil Nair subcaste.

Title in Malabar and Cochin

In the North Malabar region, Kurup title is used by Nair families who expertise in Kalaripayattu, similar to the Nambiar subcaste. These families belong to the Purathu Charna Nair caste (later known as Kiriyathil Nair), which is considered as higher to Kiriyathil Nairs of south Malabar. Kurup is also the title of Kiriyathil Nairs of south Malabar.

It is also used by Nairs in the Cochin region. They were considered similar to the Menon title and worked as scribes in Swaroopams, they belong to the Akattu charna and Kiriyathil Nair subcastes.

== Notable people ==
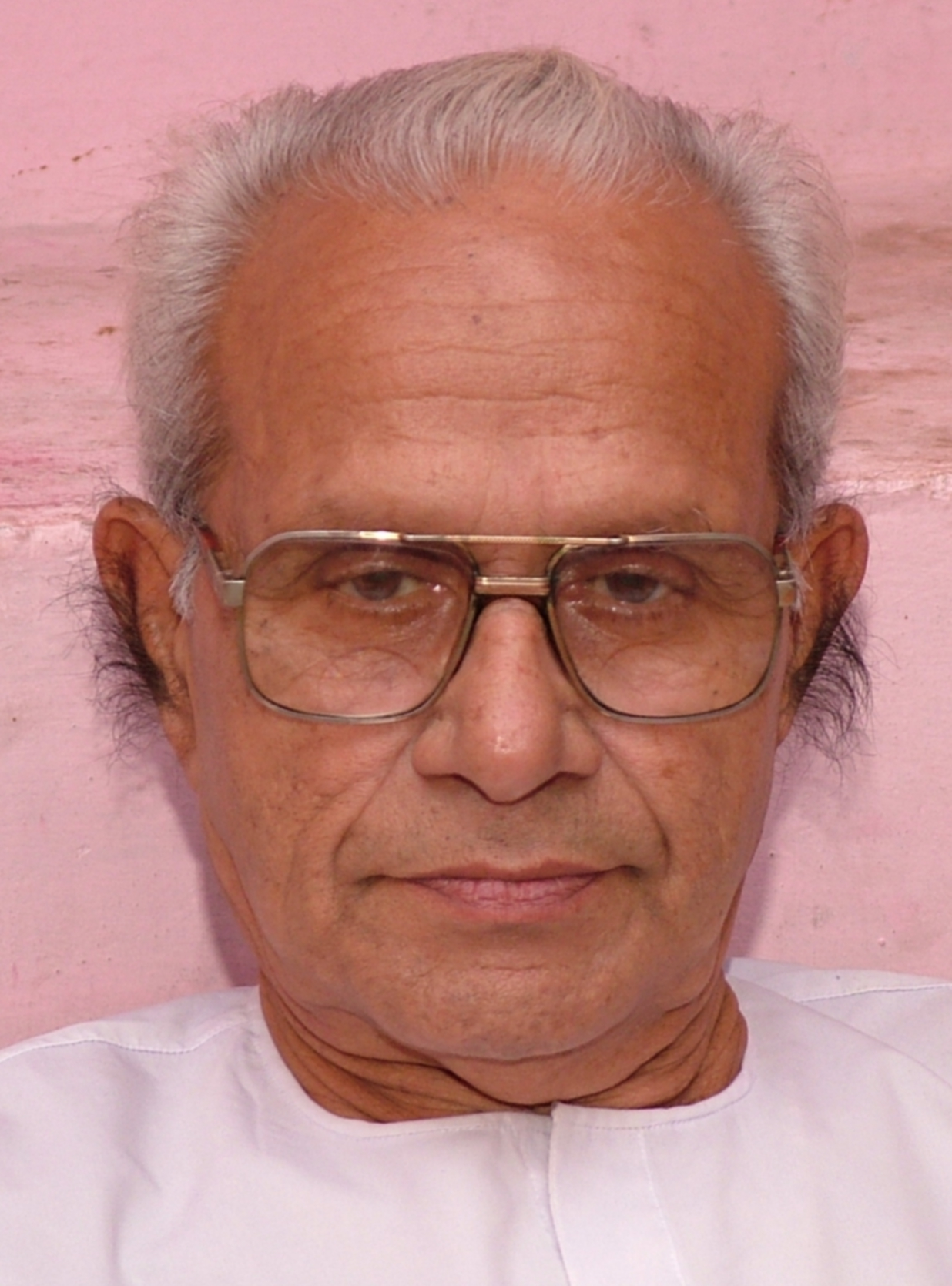
Madavoor Vasudevan Nair, veteran Kathakali artist

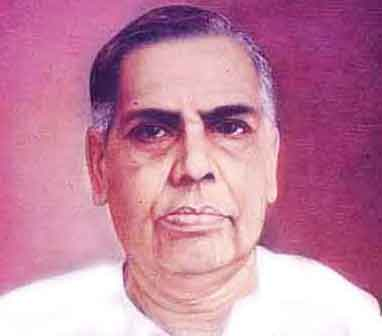
Vennikkulam Gopala Kurup, Indian poet

- Azhakathu Padmanabha Kurup, Indian scholar
- O. N. V. Kurup, Indian poet
- Madavoor Vasudevan Nair, Kathakali artist
- Raghava Kurup Narendra Prasad, Indian actor
- K. N. P. Kurup, Indian politician
- K. Narayana Kurup, Indian politician
- Parvathy Jayaram, Indian actress
- Guru Kunchu Kurup, Kathakali artist
- M. R. Kurup, Indian scientist
- P. Narayana Kurup, Indian poet
- Vennikkulam Gopala Kurup, Indian poet
- Bhama Kurup, Indian actress
- Saiju Kurup, Indian actor
