= Nambiar (caste surname) =

Indian caste

Nambiar is a Hindu caste surname prevalent mainly in the Malabar region of Kerala, India.

The term "Nambiar" meaning "trusted one" or “one who is trustworthy” which originates from the early Tamil words "Nambu" meaning "Trust"," a surname commonly given by royal families in North Malabar region to individuals from various communities who provided different services to the royal household or their temples. In some cases, it was also used as an honorific.

== List of castes using the Nambiar surname ==
Samanthan – The Samanthan Nambiars, were a caste found in Malabar region, where they were very numerous in number. They were Nair-Nambiar women who married into the royal families of the region. Many of these Samanthan families dropped the Nambiar surname in the early 1800s.

Ambalavasi Nambiar – The Ambalavasi Nambiars, also known as Mizhavu Nambiars or Chakyar Nambiars and Thiyyadi Nambiars, as well as some sections of Pushpakas and Nambeeshans, also use the Nambiar surname. These communities were associated with temples and are considered to belong to the Antarala caste. They held the second-highest spiritual rank after the Nambudiri Brahmins. Many temple activities and privileges were reserved specifically for this community, such as playing the Mizhavu in temples and performing Chakyar Koothu, among others. The family occupation of the Thiyyadi Nambiars is the performance of the Thiyattu ritual. Like the Thiyatitunnikal, they are also called Thiyadikal and wear ponnol. Ambalavasi Nambiars were a strict vegetarian community, which distinguishes them from other Nambiars.

Nair Nambiar – The Nair Nambiars are Nairs from the Kiriyathil and Charna Nair subcastes who served as landlords, soldiers, and ministers and were associated with royal families. Some families served as administrators under the Adiyodi rulers. There were different ranks and internal subdivisions among the Nair Nambiars. Chandroth, Korothu, Kallyat, Othayoth, Keloth, and Koodali Nambiars are some of the Nambiar families belonging to the Kiriyathil and Charna Nair castes. Many of these families were later upgraded to the title of Nayanar.

Vaniya Nambiars – Families from the Vaniya caste also had the Nambiar surname due to the duties assigned to them by various royal families and temples on special occasions.

Chengazhi Nambiars - Chengazhi Nambiars are said to be descendants of the Shukapuram Azhvanchery Thamprakkal, who lost their caste rank after taking up arms in a conflict.

== See also ==
- Nambiar (Ambalavasi caste)
- Nambiar (Nair subcaste)
- Pushpaka
