= Naduvazhi =

Microstate princes in Kerala, India

Location of Kerala in India

Naduvazhi, also known as Deshavazhi (IAST: nātuvāḻi; lit. 'The ruler of the land'), is a Malayalam term used for the feudatory Nair and Samantan princes who ruled over microstates that are now administrative parts of Kerala, India. They constituted the aristocratic class of Nairs within the Hindu caste system and were either kings themselves or nobility in the service of the kings of Kerala.

== Function ==
Prior to the British reorganisation of the area now known as Kerala, it was divided into around ten feudal states. Each of these was governed by a rajah (king) and was subdivided into organisational units known as nads. In turn, the nads were divided into dēsams, which anthropologist Kathleen Gough considers to be villages. However, the early 20th-century historian Kavalam Panikkar states that the dēsams were themselves divided into amsas, and that it was the latter unit that were the villages. He believes that generally only the amsas survived the reorganisation.

The person who governed the nad was known as the naduvazhi. It was an inherited role, originally bestowed by a king, and of a lower ritual rank than the royal lineages. They generally belonged to the Samantan or the Nair caste. However, some naduvazhi were feudatory chiefs, former kings whose territory had been taken over by, for example, the Zamorins of Calicut, who was from Eradi caste of Malabar. In these instances, although they were obeisant to the rajah they held a higher ritual rank than the Zamorin as a consequence of their longer history of government; they also had more power than the vassal chiefs. The naduvazhi families each saw themselves as a distinct caste in the same manner as did the rajahs; they did not recognise other naduvazhi families as being equal to them. The naduvazhi maintained criminal and civil order and could demand military service from all Nairs below him. There was usually a permanent force of between 500 and 1000 men available and these were called upon by the rajah when required. All fighting was usually suspended during the monsoon period of May to September, when movement around the country was almost impossible. Beaten roads and wheeled vehicle transport were rare until mid 18th century.

== Titles ==
Naduvazhis of Kerala used different titles. Common among them are Raja, Kidāvu, Unnithiri, Adiyodi, Pillai, Prabhu, Thirumalpad, Samantan Kaimal, Karthav, Thampan, etc. The Deshavazhis, who were ranked beneath them, used the title Kaimal, Karthav, kurup, Nayanar, Madambi Pillai, Vāzhunnor, Samantan Nambiar, Moopil Nair, etc. They were wealthy and independent noble barons who ranked under the Deshavazhis and used the title Nambiar (Nair subcaste), Naluveettil Pillai, Unnithan, Eshmanan/Emān, Mannādiar, Mooppil Nair, etc.

Historians, including Robin Jeffry, Faucett and Samuel Mateer, are of the opinion that as with all other Kings of Malabar Coast (Kerala), the Cochin Raja and Venadu Swarupam was also of Samantan or Nair origin. Mateer states: "There seems reason to believe that the whole of the kings of Malabar also, notwithstanding the pretensions set up for them of late by their dependents, belong to the same great body, and are homogeneous with the mass of the people called Nairs. Sometimes the naduvazhi was given the additional title of Prabhu by the Raja, if he had a higher than average number of Nairs under his command. He was called Ayyayira Prabhu, if he had 5,000 Nairs, and if he had 10,000 or more, then he was called a Pathinayira Prabhu."

== See also ==
- Jenmi
- Madampi
