= Kesava Pillai of Kandamath =

Indian Zamindar

M. R. Ry. Kesava Pillai of Kandamath
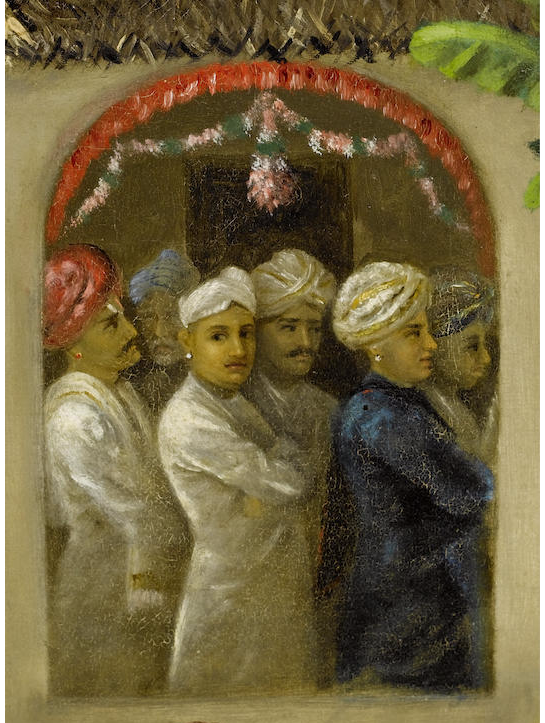

Jenmi of Chenkal and Neyyattinkara
- Monarch: Ayilyam Thirunal Visakham Thirunal Sree Moolam Thirunal
- Preceded by: Kanakku Chempakaraman Padmanabhan Mootha Pillai of Kandamath
- Succeeded by: Neyyattinkara Padmanabha Pillai

Member of the Sree Moolam Popular Assembly as Neyyattinkara
- Succeeded by: Land reform in Kerala

M. R. Ry. Chempakaraman Padmanabhan Kesava Pillai of Kandamath, Pillai of Kandamath (1830–1924), was an Indian Zamindar, one of the jenmis of Travancore and a member of the Sree Moolam Popular Assembly.

== Life ==
=== Early life ===
He was born in Vaikkom, Travancore, where his father, Brahmasree Neelakantan Namboodiripad was an ecclesiastical dignitary linked to the Vaikom Temple. His mother belonged to the family of feudatory Chiefs of Kandamath. He inherited Kandamath from his uncle, the previous Mootha Pillai of Kandamath, Kanakku Chempakaraman Padmanabhan Pandarathil. The Pillais of Kandamath settled Kandamath in medieval times. According to popular lore and family-papers called Kandamukhathu Madom Granthavari (collection of palm-leaf documents), they settled at Kandamath on the banks of the Neyyar in medieval times having originally been nobles from Kandiyoor Matom, cadet branch of the ancient line of Odanad rulers of Kayamkulam Kingdom who sought refuge in their kinsmen of the Travancore Court.

=== Reforms ===
He was nominated for the seat of Neyyatinkara Taluk by the Maharajah in the newly formed Sree Mulam Council, representing his land-holdings. He took a liberal view on untouchability, minor crimes and punishment of the depressed classes. He initiated various reforms for the education and general upliftment of the working classes. He allotted land to the Anglican Church Mission to build and run a church school at Palli Potta in Chenkal, Neyyattinkara.

He was known for his vehement opposition to the changes to the Marumakkathayam Laws of Succession. Due to the support he had given to the conservative faction within the court of Travancore, he was considered an old-timer after having failed to convince the Government from pushing the reforms through. However, this was far from the truth. Although claiming absolute loyalty to the crown, he was a staunch liberal and saw these proposed changes as an erosion of the rights of the common man against the state. This legislation created the division of family property possible in the landed families and affected the hegemony of the Nambudiri Brahmins, Rajas and upper class aristocratic Jenmi families.

=== Family ===
His remains were scattered into the Ganges at Benares from the Travancore ghat. His niece, Janaki Amma, was the mother of Gopala Menon, a judge of Travancore High Court who was presented to the King-Emperor, His Majesty King Edward VII at the 1908 Royal Levee in London; and the future diplomat K. P. S. Menon. Among sons, Neyyatinkara K. Padmanabha Pillai ("N.K." Padmanabha Pillai), was elected to the State Council and served as the second President of the Congress Party after Pattom A. Thanu Pillai. Sreedharan Nayar Kandamath, held several provincial positions and was one of the founders of Travancore Urban Bank. His daughter, Sumathy Amma, married into the Thachudaya Kaimal family of Mundanad.

=== Legacy ===
His ancestral estate of Kandamath at Chenkal, and most of his extensive landed properties, were lost to his heirs in the political turmoil following the introduction of land reforms by Communists in Kerala. The family continues the many charitable endowments in health and education. His portrait is included in the collection held by the legislative library in Kerala, in the former barracks of the Nair Brigade.

== See also ==
- Odanad
- Pulleri Illathu Madhusoodanan Thangal
- Mannarghat Nair
