= Kartha =

Aristocratic title in India

Kartha or Karthavu, meaning "Lord" in the Malayalam language, is an aristocratic title that was conferred by the kings of Kerala to Nair families who were Jenmi (feudal chieftains and landlords) and Naduvazhi (regional rulers). Among them, the Meenachil Kartha are descendants of Rajputs, whereas others are of Nair origin.

== Origin ==
The title of Kartha ("Lord") appears to have been used as a titular name by some of the rulers of Madura. During the Madras Census of 1901, the title of Kartha was returned by the Balijas who claimed to be the descendants of the Nayak kings of Madura and Tanjore. The Tekkumkur and Vadakkumkur Rajas are said to have first conferred the title of Kartha on certain influential Nair families who were related by blood to the Rajas themselves. In social matters, the authority of the Kartha was supreme. Only on important issues were higher authorities called on to intercede.

As per historical records, such as the 'International Congress on Kerala Studies', it states that territorial rulers titled Kaimal and Kartha ran parallel administrative systems by even challenging kings ( Maha Raja). The Karthas, as a community, ruled regional principalities and fiefdoms, served in the royal armies or worked as tax collectors for the kings. They also served as military commanders and feudal chieftains. The Kartha surname is still used today, although it is less prominent.

Kaimal is a closely related Cast/Title Both Kartha and Kaimal are identified as belonging to royal families. Those who belong to the old Royal families are styled Rāja or Tamburān (lord), their ladies Tamburāttis, and their houses Kōvilagams or palaces. Some Sāmantans have the caste titles of Kartāvu and Kaimal. But it does not appear that there are really any material differences between the various classes of Sāmantans, other than purely social differences due to their relative wealth and influence.

== Social Status and Culture ==
Kartha chieftains were also bestowed with extraordinary rights and authorities by the erstwhile kings and they held a special status within the royal court. They used these privileges to own vast acres of land (Jenmi). History has it that some members of the Kartha community also used to work as Supreme Commanders in the royal armies of the king, while other Kartha families were renowned for their expertise in traditional Ayurveda medicine.

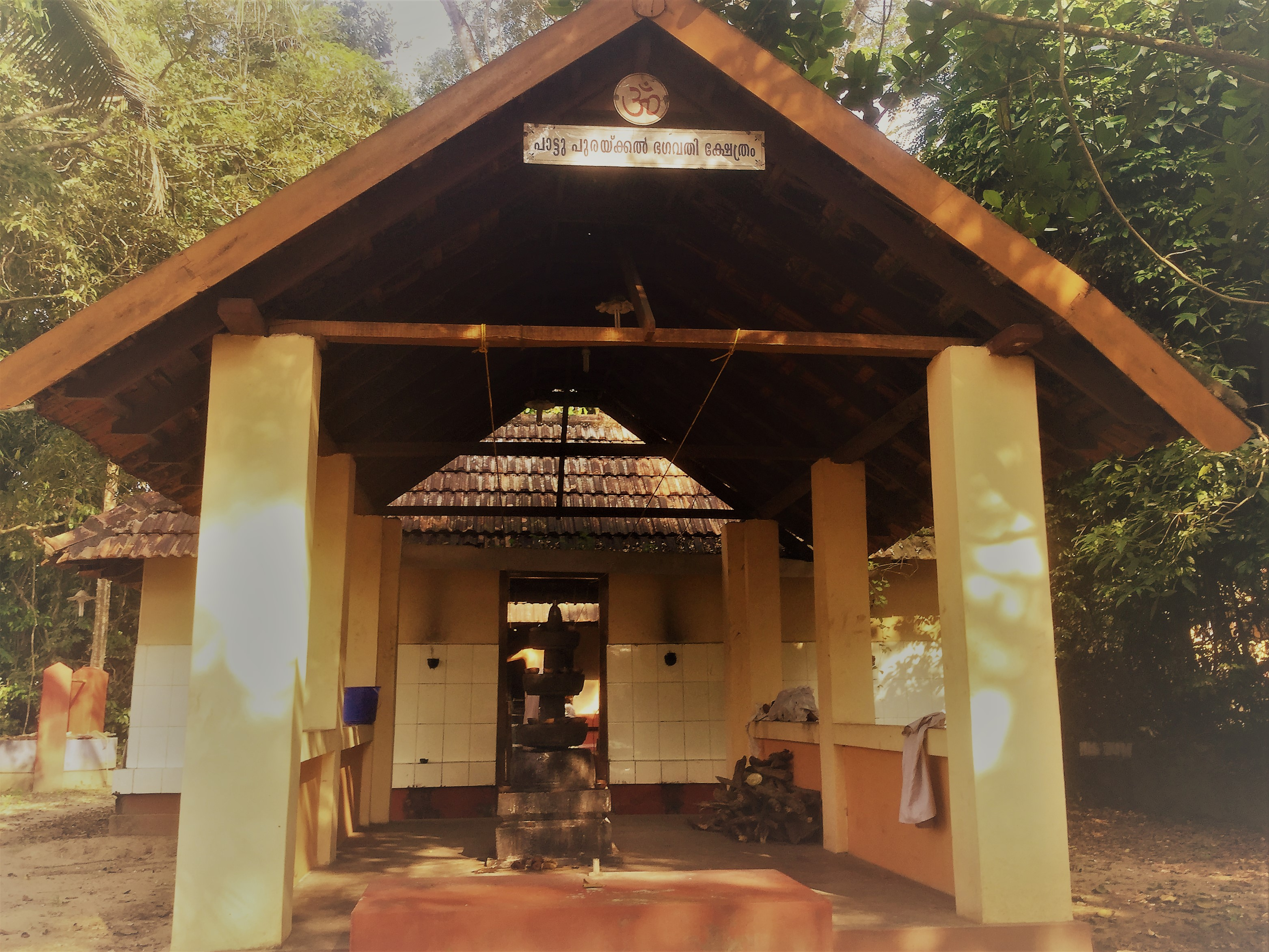
An Age-old Hindu Devi Temple of Goddess Bhadrakali. The temple belongs to Edamana Kartha Family.(Pattupurackal Bhagavathy Temple)

Most Kartha families have their ancestral tutelary deity as the Hindu Goddess Bhadrakali, or the Goddess Durga. A few families also consider their ancestral deity as Vettakkorumakan, a Hindu entity worshiped in parts of North Kerala.

== See also ==
- Caste system in Kerala
- Eshmanan
- Madampi (Nair title)
- Pillai
- Nayanar (Nair subcaste)
- Samanta Kshatriyas
