= Meenachil Kartha =

Aristocratic clan in Kerala, India

Meenachil Karthas (also known as Njavakkatt Karthas and medackal karthas) were members of a family, which ruled the kingdom of Meenachil from 14th century until 1754.

Unlike the other ruling Nair factions of Travancore who are descended from the Nāgar and Brahmin origin, they have a Rajput origin.

== Origin ==
They were actually Rajputs from Udaipur who were distantly related to the lineage of Maharana Pratap. Due to the Siege of Chittorgarh in 1303 AD, they came down south for a peaceful life. They settled in Madurai (which was a great cultural center and capital city during that time). A century later, they migrated to Kerala (the reason for which is stated as outbreak of an epidemic in Madurai) and settled in this place "Meenachil" which was named after Meenakshi of Madurai. The city of Pala was named after their barracks which were called "padapalayam". Their capital was named Mevada (after Mewar).

== Culture and assimilation ==
In Kerala, they were gradually assimilated into the major aristocratic Illam Nair (Samanthan Nair) clan in Travancore region. As they amassed power, the title of "Kartha" (meaning Lord in Malayalam) was bestowed upon them by the people. But they retained their original surname "Simhar" (variant of Singh), sometimes known with the title "Pillai" in their name as Simhar Pillai and their culture remained markedly different from other local ruling clans. Most famous of the rulers were Veera Kerala Damodara Simhar, under whose reign, the principality achieved maximum glory. They have had bilateral relations with Chera Perumals of Makotai and the Kingdom of Cochin. The warm relations with the Kingdom of Cochin earned them the title of "Njanachan" just like the title of Paliath Achan

Differing from the rest rulers of Kerala who had brahminical origin, the Meenachil Karthas follow the rajput traditions and customs. They don't generally wear the sacred thread which is part of brahminical culture, unless an individual choose to learn pooja. They are majorly characterised by their lean physique with height, along with well flexible healthy body structures.

They are pure vegetarians by tradition and differing from rest of kerala who are shaivites or vaishnavites, they have "shakti" as their deity The Meenachil Karthas were also known for their practice of equality among all sects and religions. The Karthas were the rulers who helped the Christians of Kottayam to settle down amidst the protests from other religions. The Pala Old Cathedral or St. Thomas Cathedral, Pala is a clear example of this, which was built with the aid and supervision of the Karthas. And still today on the onset of the festival of the Cathedral; the eldest existing member of the family will take part with the "udaval" (the royal sword )

== The Havoc ==
Ramayyan started conquering the kingdoms of Central and Northern Travancore one by one during the 18th century and the members of the Meenachil ruling clan was put to face an impending disaster. After breaking the backbone of the Southern Travancore aristocracy by exterminating the most powerful clans such as the Ettuveettil Pillai's and the members of Venad royal family who identified most strongly with the Illam Nair nobility (the Thampis), Marthanda Varma under the influence of his Iyer mentor wreaked havoc on smaller principalities such as Thekkumkur, Vadakkumkur, Kayamkulametc., ably supported by his Tamil allies. Many of the ruling dynasties were exterminated within a few days without any trace.

Marthanda Varma's forces invaded Meenachil in 1754. Defying the basic rules of warfare they attacked the meenachil state from behind. As of their Rajput tradition they're believed only to be surrendered to valour and not any human and the ruler of the principality did the ultimate sacrifice without surrendering before the backstabbing enemy forces. Almost all the members of the royal family were either killed in the crooked battle or did the ultimate sacrifice. The ruler for the existence of the dynasty married off two women to the family of Zamorin. At the time of Hyder Ali's invasion of Malabar during 1766, two young females were alive within the clan. Dharma Raja helped them marry into his family and resettled them. To this day as a compensation to the sin that the erstwhile ruler did to the state, the existing dynasty members receive a fixed amount of money.

Recent Records

They got invite for an event of Maharana Mewar Foundation from the royal family of the Kingdom of Mewar, Rajasthan in 2018, to acknowledge their southern brethren.
