= Eshmanan =

Feudal landlord in pre-independence south India

Eshmanan (corruption of Yajamaana Sanskrit leader) is a term used in Kerala (south India) to refer to a feudal Nair landlord. The term means "lord" in Old Malayalam and referred to Chembazhi nambi, Nambiars, and Nair caste members who occupied the position of chieftains or bestowed upon themselves when they attain enough wealth to be a Landlord. Some of the Nambiar landlords, such as Chengazhi Nambiar (Chengazinad Eshmanan), Kalliat Eshmanan and Koodali Eshmanan were among the largest landowners in Malabar Districts. Other terms for a Nair feudal landlord, included Nayanar (Nair subcaste).

This title is equivalent to others such as Madambi, Pillai, Kurup and Kaimal which were used in Travancore and Cochin areas.

== See also ==
- Madampi
- Pillai
- Nayanar (Nair subcaste)
