= Adiyodi =

Indian caste

Regions with significant populations
- Kerala

Religion
- Hinduism

Related ethnic groups
- Madampi, Samantha

Adiyodi is a subcaste of the Samantan Nair community found in the northern region of Kerala, India. It is the same caste to which the king (Raja) of Kadathanadu belonged.

== Origin and history ==
The Adiyodi caste is believed to have originated from the old Samantha Nair title "Pillai." The title "Pillai" was traditionally reserved for junior Samanthan family members and junior members of a royal family, particularly for children born of unions between the Maharaja and Nair women. Members of this group were also referred to as Pillayathiri—a compound of Pillai (royal child) and Thiri (a Sanskrit-derived term meaning "sacred one", primarily used as a suffix in Northern Kerala), which roughly translates to "sacred royal child." They held a unique social position as lords of landlords, ranking below the king but above the landed gentry. This elevated status gave rise to the title Adiyodi, which can be interpreted as "lord of lords." Women belonging to this group were known as Pillayathiri Amma, maintaining the same sacred undertone. Children born to an Adiyodi were known as Kidavu, which also means "royal child". In certain regions, under the influence of Sanskritization, this title evolved into Unnithiri, where Unni also denotes a royal child in the local context.

The Raja of Kadathanadu is traditionally believed to belong to the Adiyodi caste. Historical accounts suggest that they were originally Samanthan Nair Royal families. Due to conflicts with the Zamorin of Calicut (Samoothiri), they were driven out from their lands. Following their displacement, the Raja of Chirakkal is said to installed them as lords or vassals under his dominion.

== Caste system ==
Members of the Adiyodi caste were traditionally regarded as socially superior to all type of Nair subcastes. The Adiyodis were considered to hold a position above the traditional Nair caste and immediately below the king in the social hierarchy. This intermediate status sometimes led to their classification as Antarala Jati, in the traditional Kerala caste structure. Marriages were primarily arranged within the Samantan (Samanthan or Samanthan Nair) communities, reflecting their elevated status. In some instances, they also engaged in Sambandham with women from the Nambiar, Purathu Charna and Kiriyathil Nair subcastes of North Malabar.

== Notable people ==
- Kenoth G. Adiyodi, Indian zoologist and author
- K. G. Adiyodi, Indian politician
