= Ilayathu =

Hindu community in Kerala, South India

Ilayathu (also written as Ilayath, Illath, Elayath, and Elayathu), meaning "Younger", is a Hindu community in Kerala, India, who belong to a sect of Malayala Brahmins. The house of an Ilayath is known as an Illam. The origin of this community, like those of the Nambudiris and Nairs, and other upper-class communities in Kerala, is shrouded in mystery, barring a few legends and traditions.

== See also ==
- Ambalavasi
