= Kiryathil Nair =

Nair Sub-caste

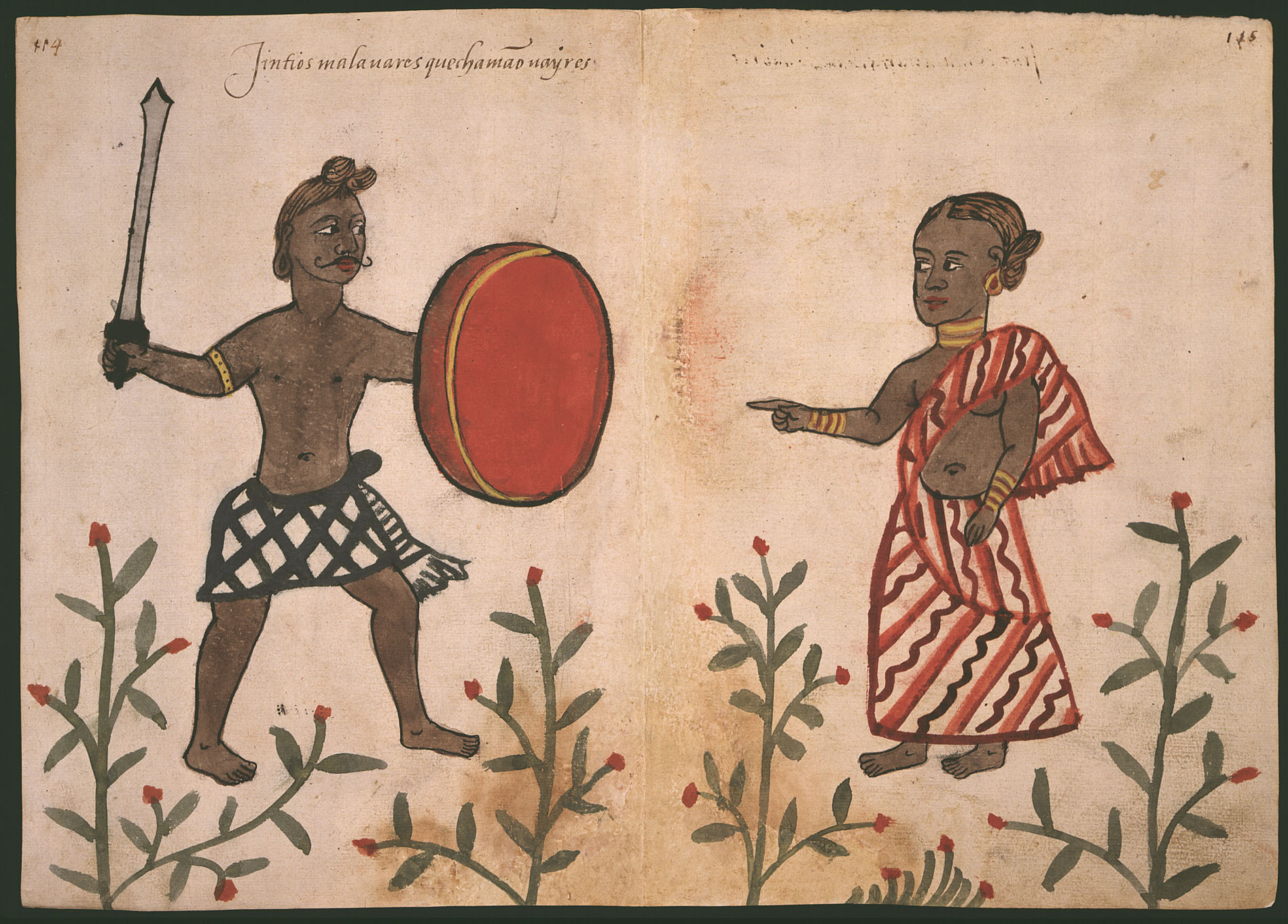
- Anonymous 16th century Portuguese illustration from the Códice Casanatense, depicting a Malabarese couple of the Nair warrior caste. It illustrates a Nair soldier and his wife, with the inscription reading, "Malabarese gentiles that are called Nayars."

Total population
- Less than 20% of the total Nair population

Regions with significant populations
- Mostly in Malabar and Cochin, and also in parts of Travancore

Languages
- Malayalam, Sanskrit

Religion
- Hinduism

Related ethnic groups
- Nair, Nambuthiri, Samantan, Samantha Kshatriya

Kiryathil Nair or Kiriyath Nair also known as Vellayama Nairs is the highest ranking Shudra subdivision of the Nair caste of martial nobility, who performed the functions of Kshatriyas in Kerala, India They were independent barons and also served as Deshavazhis of the regions of Malabar District and Cochin.

This was one of the highest-ranking sub-castes of the Nair community along with the Samantan Nairs and Samantha Kshatriya, with whom they share a close history. They have traditionally lived in ancestral homes known as Tharavads and Kovilakams.

In medieval Kerala, most of the kings belonged to extensions of the Samanthan and Kiryathil Nair castes, including the Zamorins of Calicut who were from the Eradi subgroup of the Samantan Nair subcaste. The Koratty Kaimals and Kodassery Karthas under the Perumpadappu swaroopam who were also from the Kiryathil Nair subcaste. Historians have also stated that, "The whole of the Kings of Malabar belong to the same great body, and are homogeneous with the mass of the people called as Nairs."

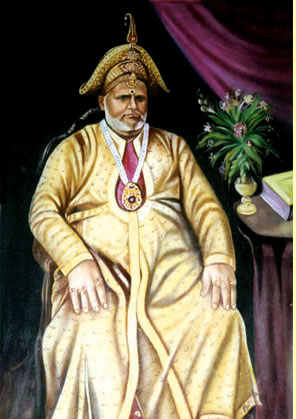
The lineage of the Zamorins of Calicut was that of the Samantan Nairs whose ancestors performed the Śrauta Hiranyagarbha ritual to achieve a higher status that empowered them to rule over the Brahmins. The Kiryathil Nairs were one of the constituent members of the Samantan community.

The Kiryathil Nairs were the original descendants of the Vellalars who according to the text Keralolpathi were Shudras who migrated to Kerala to serve the Namboodiris. An alternate theory was that the Kiriyathil Nairs were descendants of serpent worshipping local hill tribes of Kerala called Nagas. They were historically given status and privileges that were not extended to other Nairs. In the words of the British anthropologist Edgar Thurston CIE, "The original Nairs were undoubtedly a military body, holding lands and serving as a militia."

== Etymology ==
The term "Kiryathil" is derived from the word Griham, meaning "house." They were also known as "Adukalakkar" because they were excellent cooks of their Sthani overlords in Malabar. The Adukalakkar (kitchen men) from each taravad would send at least one man to the Sthani head's house to cook during the fourteen days of death pollution (pula) observed by the taravad, sometimes they also refer to as "KolliUntikal," meaning "feeders of firewood," in reference to their role in cooking for their Sthani heads during ritual occasions in Malabar Districts. They were also recognized as independent feudal lords. The Charna Nairs were traditionally employed as soldiers in the armies of regional kings, formed the bulk of the military controlled by Kiryathil overlords, who themselves reported directly to the Zamorin, the king of Calicut. Additionally, Kiryathils were also the only Nair division whose members were allowed to wear bracelets on both arms (a symbol of aristocracy). In ancient times, the land was divided into Naadus and Desams, each governed by rulers known as Naaduvazhi and Desavazhi, respectively, often belonging to the Samanthan Nair and Kiriyath Nair lineage in Malabar District.

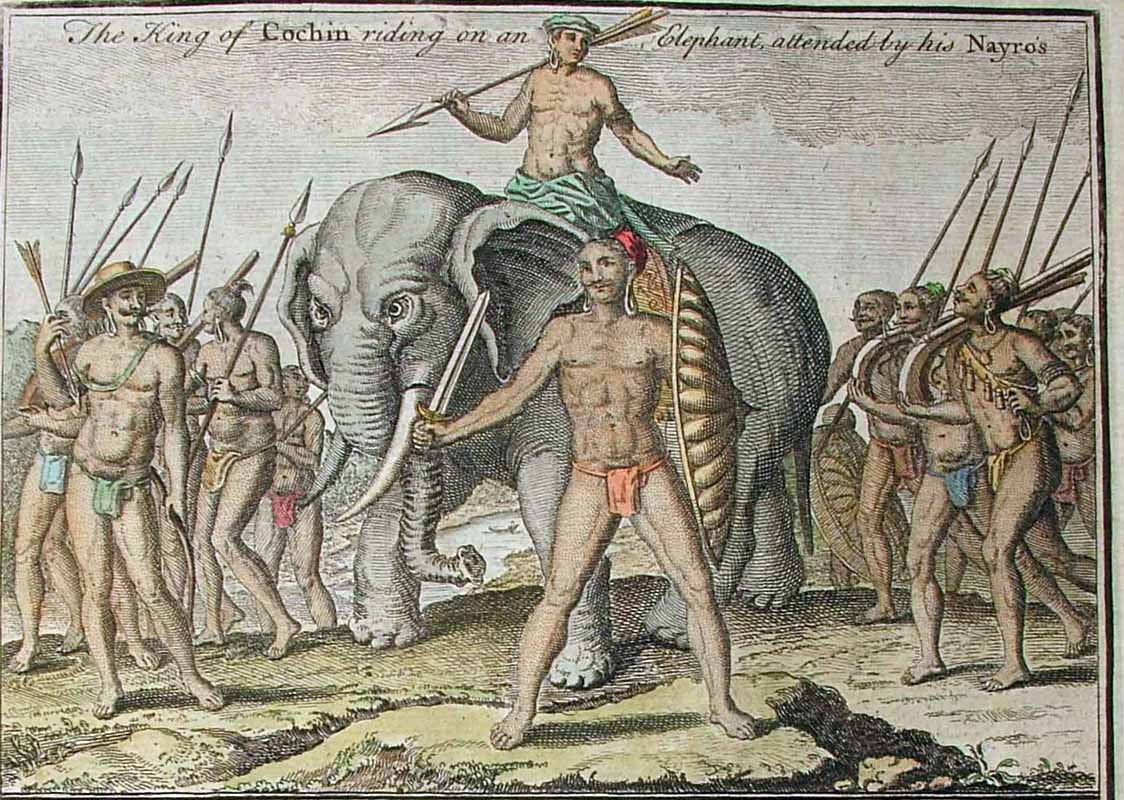
The King of Cochin riding his war elephant, surrounded by soldiers. The Kaimals and Karthas were the two major feudal houses within the Cochin royal family, with the king being elevated to the rank of Samantha Kshatriya by performing the Śrauta Hiranyagarbha ritual every 8 years. The soldiers, on the other hand, were from the Swaroopathil Nair caste.

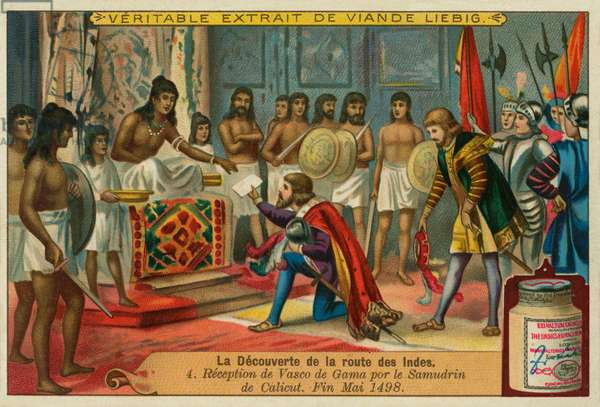
Vasco Da Gama being welcomed by the Samoothiri of Calicut, in the year 1498

== Military heritage ==
These Nair families belong to or connected to the aristocratic tharavads, which were ancestral homes associated with prestige, power and wealth in medieval Kerala.

== Relation with Samantha Kshatriyas ==
The caste boundary between Kiryathil Nair and Samantha Nair is very minor and therefore many families among the Kiryathils, over the course of time, became recognised as Samanthan and vice versa. As anthropologist Christopher Fuller notes, all Kshatriyas of Kerala are "super-eminent Nairs." The Kiriyathil Nairs served as regional rulers, lords and military chieftains for various kingdom's of Kerala, including the Zamorin, and owned vast amounts of lands and raised soldiers.

The title of "Kaimal" (from the Malayalam word Kai - "കൈ," meaning "hand" - signifying power and authority) was awarded by the monarchs of Kerala to affluent Samantha Nair and also some Kiriyath Nair families who were exceedingly influential, and the Kaimals were one of the highest caste of Hindu caste in South India.

The title of "Kartha" (from the Malayalam word Karthavu - "കർത്താവ്", meaning "lord" - signifying command and dominance) was awarded to notable Nair families who had relations with the ruling class. While the Karthas were generally considered to be lower than the Kaimals in terms of seniority, both of them jointly formed the two major Aristocratic lineages of the Cochin royal family.

== Branching of power ==
The Kiryathil Nairs, due to their significance in being the direct descendants of the Nagavanshi Kshatriya clan who migrated to southern India, formed the "original" rank from which the two most powerful royal houses of Kerala stemmed from:

The Zamorins, who were originally Eradi Subcaste of Kiryathil Nairs whose ancestors performed the Hiranyagarbha ceremony to elevate them to the rank of Samantan Nairs. They eventually became the kings of Calicut, beginning around 1124 AD.

Kiryathil Nair ⟶ Hiranyagarbha ritual ⟶ Samantan Nairs ⟶ The Zamorin (Kings of Calicut, circa. 1124 AD)

Incidentally, the Zamorins of Calicut and the Rajas of Cochin were engaged in a feudal struggle with each other, culminating in a series of military conflicts. Notable battles include the Battle of Cochin (1504), which saw the Kingdom of Calicut suffer a devastating defeat at the hands of their Cochin opponents, who were assisted by the Portuguese Empire.

== Military conquests ==
Among the numerous military conquests carried out by the Samantan and Kiryathil Nairs, the most significant was their victory against Tipu Sultan, the de facto Muslim ruler of Mysore. Tipu Sultan, along with his predecessor Hyder Ali, was aware of the caste pride that Nairs held, as well as their strict adherence to the Hindu faith and military excellence on the battlefield. He therefore deprived them of their caste status, and prohibited them from carrying arms and outlawed them. When this failed to break their martial spirit, starting in 1786 AD, Tipu Sultan began the forceful conversion of Nairs into Sunni Islam, and when they resisted and refused, he tortured, humiliated and killed most of the Nair warriors.

Historical records show that out of the 30,000 Nair warriors who were captured alive by him, only about a hundred or so survived. The Samantans and Kiryathils vowed vengeance, and marshalled the Malayali soldiers. The Samantan Nair warrior-prince Ravi Varma Raja defeated Tipu Sultan in November 1788, while the King of Travancore Dharma Raja Rama Varma sent the Travancore Nair Brigade, under the command of Raja Kesavadas, to defeat Tipu Sultan again during the Battle of Nedumkotta in early 1790. The Nairs were helped by the Maratha Empire and the Sikh Empire, all three of whom united to destroy the armies of the Muslim ruler and finally rescue the surviving Nairs by March 1792.

== Varna classification ==
Historically, despite the absence of the usual 4-tier Varṇa classification in South India, the Kiriyathil Nair along with Samanthan Nair, Illathu Nair and Swaroopathil Nairs were objectively considered as Shudras that carried out Kshatriya functions, having functions like ruling, administrative, military and social requirements and duties that are associated with warrior aristocracy, as given in the Manusmriti, the legendary legal text of Hinduism.

== Social status ==
While some Kiryathil Nair families were regional rulers who functioned as vassal kings to the Zamorins, most were independent aristocratic feudal lords and controlled groups of soldiers known as Charnavar under their command. These soldiers usually belonged to the Purattu Charna Nair subcaste.

Currently, the Kiryathils constitute less than 4% of the total Nair population.

== Caste inheritance ==
Until the early 20th century, almost all Nair families, irrespective of their social standings, followed a matrilineal system of inheritance. The children of a Nair couple would inherit the caste of their mother, while the property and lands that were owned by the family would be passed down through their daughters and sisters. This form of matrilineal inheritance was known as Marumakkathayam, and resulted in Nair families holding their women in high honor. However, the Government of Kerala passed "The Joint Family System (Abolition) Act" in 1975, which abolished this practice.

Furthermore, the historic 1926 Travancore Nayar Act (signed by the Queen of Travancore Sethu Lakshmi Bayi) greatly reduced the role of women in caste inheritance, and by late 1928, the matrilineal system of caste among Nairs was completely replaced by the patrilineal system that was followed by the rest of India. For this reason, the vast majority of Nair families have switched to favoring the father's caste for his children, while only a few of them have kept the traditional method of favoring the mother's.

== See also ==
- Nayanar (Nair subcaste)
- Nambiar (Nair subcaste)
- Achan
- Nair
- Kaimal
- Samantha Kshatriya
- Swaroopathil Nair
