= Kalari Panicker =

Indian ethnic group of Hindu religion

Kalari Panicker / Kalari Kurup is an ethnic group belonging to the Hindu religion, who live in the Malabar (North Kerala) and central parts of the Indian state of Kerala. They were known as the masters of Kalari tradition, having their Nalpatheeradi Kalari (a name derived from its area of 42 x 21 feet). They are the people who propagated and practiced Kalaripayattu, a martial art from Kerala.

The titles Kurup and Panicker are prevalent in several other communities in Kerala, e.g. Nair Kurup and Panicker who belong to the Nair community, and should not be confused with Kalari Panicker or Kalari Kurup, they have distinct identities.

== History ==
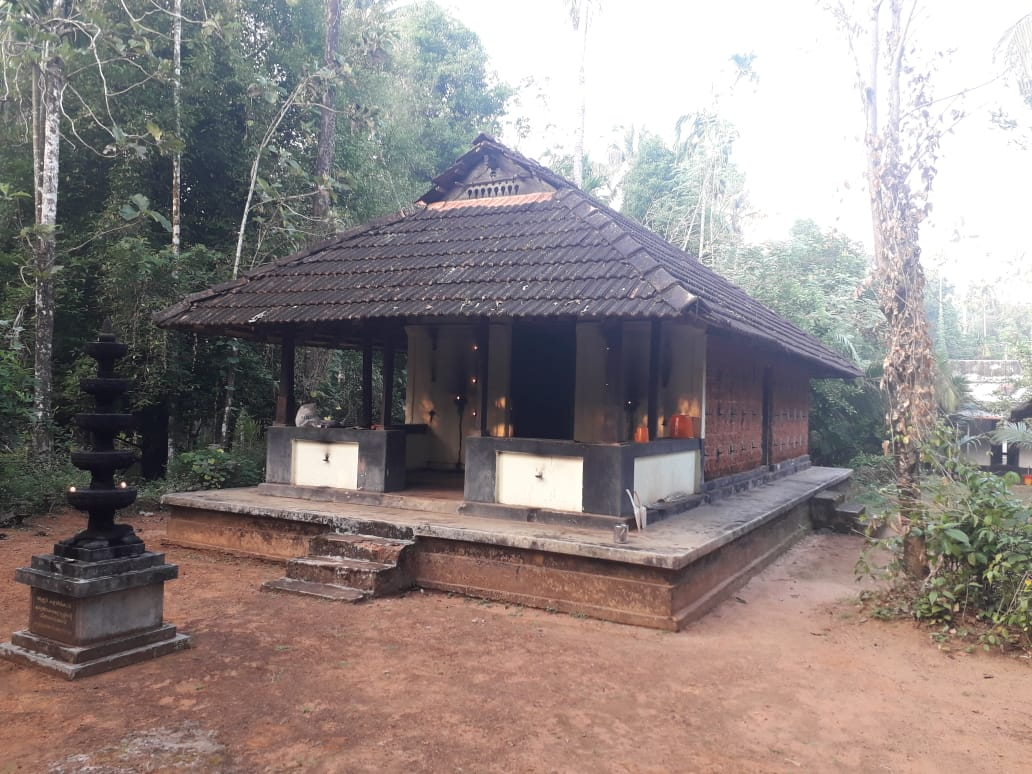
A present-day Kalari in Aloor, Thrissur, Kerala (Aloor Kalari)

Kalaris in Kerala were established during different periods of time. The formation of Kerala is interlinked to the story of Parashurama. It is believed that Parashurama established 108 kalaris across Kerala. Several kalaris were established during the reign of Kulasekharas. In the 12th century towards the end of Perumal era, the present state of Kerala was divided into small autonomous provinces called Nadus and ruled by its own Kings. During the Kulasekhara rule and later the kings of Nadus brought in warriors from Tulu Nadu. The Purananuru poems mentions about such warriors. These warriors known as Nambi Kurup were helped by the kings to settle in Kerala by granting them land and wealth to maintain and upkeep kalaris.They used the martial arts mastery of the Nambi Kurup to settle their disputes and hence, existence of kalaris became prevalent.

Kalari Panicker or Kalari Kurup are descendants of those Aacharyas or masters migrated from Tulu Nadu.

The community which based on its traditional occupation around Kalari, were given the title Kurup or Panicker by the kings and villagers and later came to be known as Kalari Kurup or Kalari Panicker.

== Traditional occupations ==
Fencing masters from the Kalari Kurup / Kalari Panicker community historically taught Kalaripayattu to the Thiyya community in Kerala.

Following the recommendations of Lord Richards, the British Administration in 1804 abolished the practice of martial arts and using weaponry in Kerala. As a result of this, Naalpatheeradi Kalaris were transformed into family temples. When the Kalari institutions were forcefully closed by the implementation of law, many Kalari masters adopted astrology as their occupation. Since then, the community has seen several scholars in astrology.

During Kalaripayattu training and during wars, Kalaris offered Kalari Marma treatment. Kalari Gurukkal (Kalari Masters) were specially trained in administering these traditional treatments. They were also identified for their proficiency in ayurvedic medicines.

More complex forms of marma treatment which give agility, flexibility and suppleness of the body through massage or Uzhichil were performed by the masters.

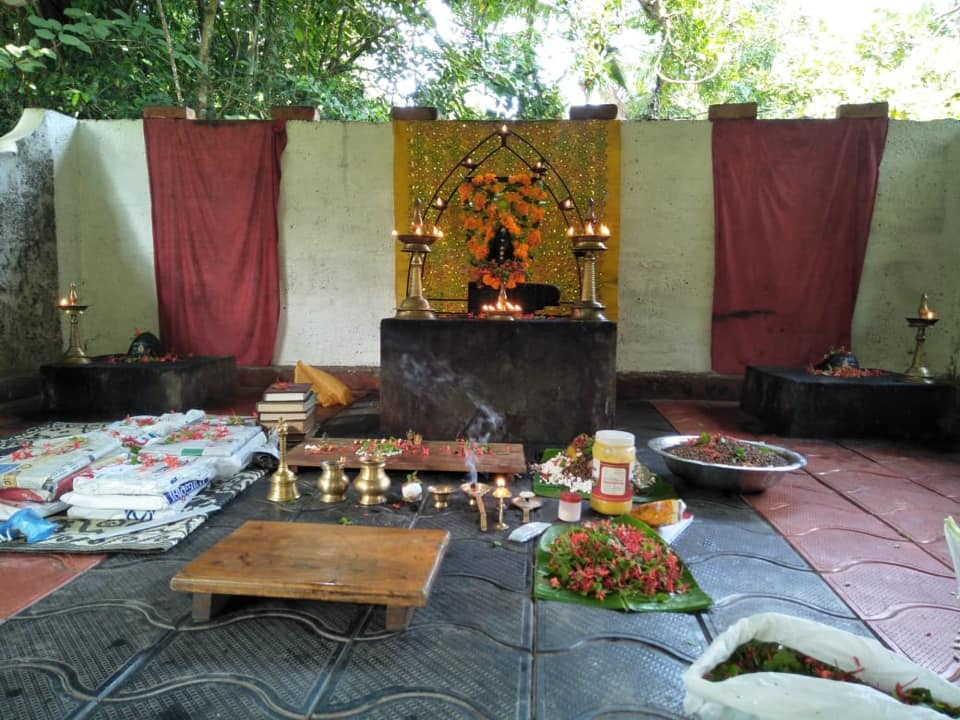
Pooja of books during Saraswathi pooja at Engandiyur Kalari, Thrissur, Kerala

Masters from the Kalari Panicker community were also involved in providing preliminary education (reading and writing) to their students.

== Dwelling ==
The Masters of Naalpatheeradi Kalari registered their presence in Kerala and were present at geographical limits between south of Korapuzha and north of Aluva Puzha (Tributary of Periyar river) comprising the South Malabar area, the present Palakkad, Thrissur and some parts of Ernakulam district coming under the Cochin Province.

== Culture ==
=== Customs and Tradition ===
The customs and religious traditions followed throughout the length and breadth of Kerala is similar in nature and derives its base from the Arya-Dravida culture and religious traditions. The Kalaris were a unification of temple of worship and ground for training in martial arts. The structure and design of Kalari and the Devi or Goddess deities of the Temple is an indication of the Arya-Dravida influence in their tradition.

Masters from Kalari Panicker community usually established their Kalari near the south west corner of their residence (Tharavadu). The Kalari typically has idols of Kalari Gods - the deities of War and the idols of great forefathers and Aacharyas. Inside the Kalari premises a separate premise is designated to pay respects and prayers to the forefathers and the founders of the Kalari. This method of making idols of forefathers (founders of the Kalaris) as Guru Tharas is unique and makes this community distinct from most other castes in India.

=== Attire ===
Dressing style adopted by Kalari Panicker community was similar to that of the Nair in the Society. They used to wear mundu, a piece of white long cloth, fastened to their waist and also used to wear Randam Mundu, a similar small cloth which is folded neatly and put on the shoulder. They used to put sandal paste on the forehead, tighten their lengthy hair to a Kuduma and welcome the mornings with devotional Sanskrit chants. There was a society-imposed restriction that people of lower castes were not allowed to adorn or carry an umbrella made of palm leaves while on a journey. Since Kalari Panicker were masters to Savarna or upper castes, they were allowed to use the palm leaves' umbrellas.

== Social status ==
The community is listed under the Other Class as published by the Government of Kerala.
