= Aiyappan Pillai =

Indian lawyer, politician, and writer (1914–2022)

K. Aiyappan Pillai
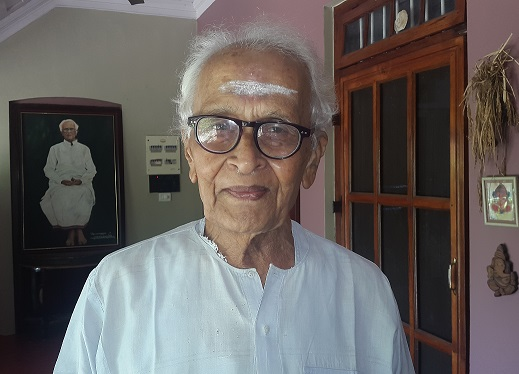

Personal details
- Born: 24 May 1914 Mundanad House, Travancore (present-day Trivandrum , Kerala, India)
- Died: 5 January 2022 (aged 107) Thiruvananthapuram, Kerala, India
- Party: Indian National Congress (formerly); Bharatiya Jana Sangh (formerly); Bharatiya Janata Party (later)
- Spouse: Rajamma
- Relations: Thachudaya Kaimal Maharaja of Travancore (maternal uncle)
- Children: 2
- Parents: A. Kumara Pillai; Bhargavi Amma of Mundanad
- Education: Government Arts College, Thiruvananthapuram; Government Law College, Thiruvananthapuram
- Occupation: Lawyer

M. R. Ry. K Aiyappan Pillai (24 May 1914 – 5 January 2022; Sanskrit Ārya Kerala Varman) was an Indian lawyer, politician and writer. As one of the early leaders of the Bharatiya Janata Party, he served as its vice-president and at various times as chairman and treasurer. By the time of his death aged 108, he headed the party's disciplinary committee, oversaw its charitable endowments, and had become a most respected and venerable figure in the socio-cultural arena.

== Early life and education ==
The son of the Kumara Pillai of Nagercoil, Aiyappan Pillai was born in the princely state of Travancore to an aristocratic Nair family related to the ruling dynasty of Travancore. His eldest uncle was the Thachudaya Kaimal a ruling chief and a religious dignitary of Kerala residing at the Koodalmanikyam Temple. He was educated privately and graduated from the Law College, Trivandrum.

== Career ==
Following a meeting with Mahatma Gandhi, he chose to give up a stately sinecure and agitate for responsible government. He participated in the Quit India Movement. Gandhi advised him to serve the people directly which prompted him to stand for elections in the newly formed legislature of Travancore representing Trivandrum as an Indian National Congress candidate.

As a lawyer and close-confidante of the Maharaja of Travancore, Chithira Thirunal Balarama Varma, when India attained Independence, he was asked by the Maharaja to carry on secret negotiations with Indian National Congress and the Government of Travancore in 1947.

In 1971, he was requested to be a figurehead for the newly created Bharatiya Janata Party. Thereafter, he remained behind the scenes in the region's politics, as Chairman at various times and as a vice-president of the BJP.

== Legacy ==
Ayyappan Pillai was one of the prominent fighters for responsible government in Travancore. He was able to bring the attention of the royal administration to the grievances of the people of Travancore. During his childhood days, he boycotted foreign factory made clothes and started wearing handwoven Khadi inspired by Gandhi and Sri Aurobindo. He promoted traditional weaving of cotton & silk in Travancore following in the footsteps of Gandhiji. Unlike most members of the aristocracy, he has exercised his democratic right to vote in all the elections in the state and encouraged people to participate in democracy.

== Later life and death ==
At the time of his death, aged 107, he was the senior-most member of the Bar Council of India. He had also served as one of the first councillors of the then newly created Thiruvananthapuram Corporation from his home constituency .

Aiyappan Pillai lived for much of his life at Shroff House, a large traditional stately house set within sprawling private grounds in Thycaud, a rarity in the heart of Trivandrum.

Aiyappan Pillai turned 100 in May 2014. By 2020, he was noted as being the senior-most living member of the Bar in India. He died of old age in Thiruvananthapuram on 5 January 2022, at the age of 107. Aiyappan Pillai was given a state funeral with full honours. He was cremated according to traditional customs in the presence of dignitaries including the Governor of Kerala Arif Mohammad Khan representing the Government of India.

== Books published ==
- Challenging Times and My Life: Memoirs of Aiyappan Pillai
