= Thachudaya Kaimal =

Lineage of ruling chiefs in ancient Trvancore from Kerala, India

The Thachudaya Kaimals were a lineage of ruling Nair chiefs in Travancore, now in the Indian state of Kerala. This line goes back to the period of the early rulers of Venadu, now known as Travancore. Based on the 18th-century installation of Thachudaya Kaimal, as recorded in the book History of Kerala, it is stated that, the title 'Thachudaya Kaimal' is given after a ceremony performed by the Yogakkars (Nambudiri Brahmins), work with local rulers to consecrate a Thachudaya Kaimal, performing rituals and offering blessings. At the end of the ceremony, the group announces to the Travancore Raja that the Illathu Puthen Veetil Kumara Kurup (Nair Nobleman of Travancore), is officially declared sacred as the new Thachudaya Kaimal to oversee the Koodalmanikyam Temple and its estates. After the ceremony, he will attain a higher status and position above the Brahmins.

Thachudaya Kaimals are slightly different and hold a higher social position than the other Kaimal families of Kerala; they belong to the Samantha Nair class among Nairs. The Thachudaya Kaimal is a sacerdotal dignitary in Kerala and is considered the spiritual chief and temporal ruler of the Koodalmanikyam Temple and its estates.

== History ==
The line goes back into antiquity and is mentioned in the Skanda Purana. Tradition dictates that the Guruvayur temple belonging to the Zamorin of Malabar, the Koodalmanikyam temple of the Thachudaya Kaimal family of Travancore and the Sree Padmanabhaswamy Temple of the Travancore royal family are the grandest temples in Kerala in terms of size and proportion of offerings.

Historians are of the opinion that the first Kaimal of the temple was the Kulasekhara Perumal of the second Chera Empire a venerated saint in Vaishanavism Despite this, the Thachudaya Kaimal combined their instinctive conservatism with the most liberal views.

Mahatma Gandhi, recognising that by ancient law and custom the Thachudaya Kaimal had ultimate spiritual authority over the Hindus, visited Irinjalakkuda during the 1930s to persuade the Kaimal to order by decree the Temple Entry Proclamation and to persuade the Maharaja to issue an ordinance to abolish untouchability. Following Gandhi's visit and Temple Entry in Travancore, an attempt to depose the Thachudaya Kaimal as a ruling chief and outcaste the Maharaja of Travancore from Hinduism was instigated by the Raja of Cochin but the Kaimal was reinstated by the British Raj authorities with an order from the Viceroy and Governor-General of India.

== End of hereditary rights ==
Nominated by the Maharaja of Travancore, the Kaimal was raised to the status of Manikkam Keralar by an elaborate Brahminical ceremony called Jatakavarodham where all the ruling chiefs of Kerala had to be present. Once anointed, the Thachudaya Kaimal had no acknowledged superiors in spiritual matters. The Ruling Chief had an escort of the Travancore Nair Brigade. He had no acknowledged superiors and did not rise even in the presence of kings. The residence of the Thachudaya Kaimals is the Kottilakkal Palace in Irinjalakuda. The heraldry of the Kaimals bear the insignia of a coiled conch-shell with the words Manikkan Keralar. The rule of the empire was also vested in the Kaimal from time to time, especially when there is an interregnum between the death of one king and anointing of an other. With the 26th amendment of the Indian constitution in 1971, the princely order in India was abolished by presidential decree and thus the Thachudaya Kaimals lost their claim to the temple and its estates. Those properties are now run by a Trust managed by the District Collector although a vestige of former power lies in the current Thachudaya Kaimal being the chief trustee of the temple. The Thachudaya Kaimals enjoyed legal rights such as being preceded by a personal escort of attendants with lamp and sword despite the loss of pension.

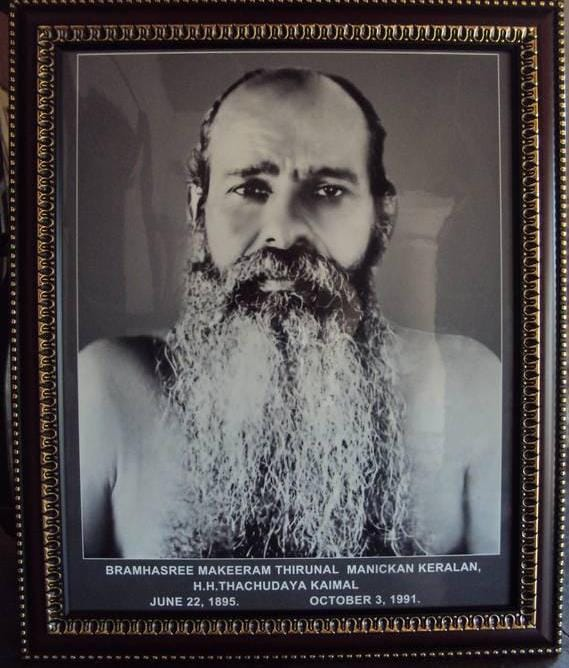
The Thachudaya Kaimal

The last Thachudaya Kaimal was named Bhaskara at birth on 22 June 1895 in the Mundanad branch of the Kayamkulam royal family, by then residing at Valiyasala, Trivandrum. He was an upasaka of Ganesha and the thevaram idol he worshipped is now worshipped with a temple in its own right outside the Koodalmanikkam Temple

== Notable people ==
- Aiyappan Pillai, was an Indian lawyer, politician and writer.
