= Kaimal =

Title given to chiefs from Nair caste

Kaimal is an aristocratic title granted by the kings of Kerala to Nair families. The word originates from the Malayalam word "Kai," meaning "the hand," signifying power in medieval Kerala. Kaimal is considered one of the highest titles for Nairs. They were the Jenmi (feudal chieftains) and Naduvazhi (regional rulers) of Kerala.

Several well known families have borne the title, including the Thachudaya Kaimal, and the Kaimals of Koratti, Angi and Pondicherry. Many of them are also part of the Kshatriya Kshema Sabha, along with the Nair Service Society.

== Subcaste ==
Koima + Alu: Koima (Dominant) Alu (Person) means 'The person who dominates.' This was the title given to the feudal chiefs under the Kerala kings.

The Kaimals were the title awarded to individuals from different Nair subcastes.

There are different Nair Kaimals: (1) Thachudaya Kaimal, (2) Vakkayil Kaimal, (3) Vakkathu Illam Kaimal, (4) Kiriyathil Nair Kaimal, (5) Illathu Nair Kaimal, (6) Moothedathu Kaimal, (7) Eleyedathu Kaimal, (8) Thengumpillil Kaimal, (9) Aalangattu Kaimal, (10) Kodancheri Kaimal, (11) Koratty Kaimal, (12) Anchi Kaimal, (13) Ner Nintha Kaimal, and (14) Chuzhandu Vanna Kaimal, to name a few of the better-known Kaimal families.

Kaimals of Cochin

The Kaimals of Cochin are direct descendants or sons of Tulu Cheraman Perumal stemming from his different wives, a revered Chera king who ruled the state during the medieval period from Kodungallur. They were two types, first one is Stāni Nair subcaste and other is Vellayama Nair (Kiriyathil Nair) subcaste. The Kaimals of Cochin, usually known as the Sthani Nair caste, were typically Nairs who were blood-related to the king or royal families. Stani Nairs had a higher caste status than the Kiriyathil Nair (Vellayama Nair) caste, which was more prevalent in the Malabar region, though sometimes they were considered part of the Kiriyathil Nair caste due to the small population of Stāni Nairs. In some cases, Which is also given to few Kiriyathil Nair families.

Kaimals of Travancore

The Thachudaya Kaimals were ruling chiefs of Travancore, nominated by the Travancore Raja from the Noble Nair families. They were from the Illathu Nair (Samanthan Nair of Travancore) subcaste.

== The Dutch in Cochin ==
On 26 October 1662, the rulers of Kochi successfully defeated the Portuguese who wanted to change the statue of Kochi from that of an ally to that of a vassal. They exploited the rivalry between the Dutch and the Portuguese, and made the Dutch their ally in the war against the Portuguese forces. The Kochi kings fought this battle with the assistance rendered by the Anchi Kaimals.

T. I. Poonen says

It may be mentioned that one of the important causes of Dutch success in Cochin was the loyal co-operation they received from the Anchi Kaimals or five lords of whom the most important was Cheranellular Kartha.

== Regional rulers ==
Some regional rulers such as Koratty Kaimal were served and protected by trained non-Nair warriors as well.

Territorial rulers titled Kaimal and Kartha ran parallel administrative systems by challenging kings. Many of them were very powerful and even Raja sought help from foreign powers such as the Portuguese to conquer them.

== See also ==
- Jenmi
- Eshmanan
- Madampi (Nair title)
