= Potti =

Sect of Brahmins in Kerala state of India

Potti is the name of a sect of Brahmins in India based primarily in the Indian state of Kerala, the Malabar region and Shivalli.

== Etymology ==
Potti is a Tamil word meaning "deep respect for someone" and is used for Tulu-Malayali Brahmins.

== History ==
At present, Pottis are often identified as Embrandiris or Tulu Brahmin immigrants. However, there were three classes of Pottis based on three periods of settlement in Kerala.

There are Pottis of Kerala origin and Tulu origin. Pottis of Tulu origin came to Malabar region as temple priests in the 16th century. Those who migrated from South Kanara to Malabar are known as Embrandiri or Embranthiri, while those who settled in Shivalli were known as "Shivalli Brahmins", they continue to be based in Udupi or Sivalli in South Kanara.

== Fictional characters ==
- Kodumon Potti played by actor Mammootty in the 2024 Indian Malayalam-language black-and-white period folk horror film Bramayugam.
