= Malayali Brahmin =

Group of Brahmins from the Indian state of Kerala

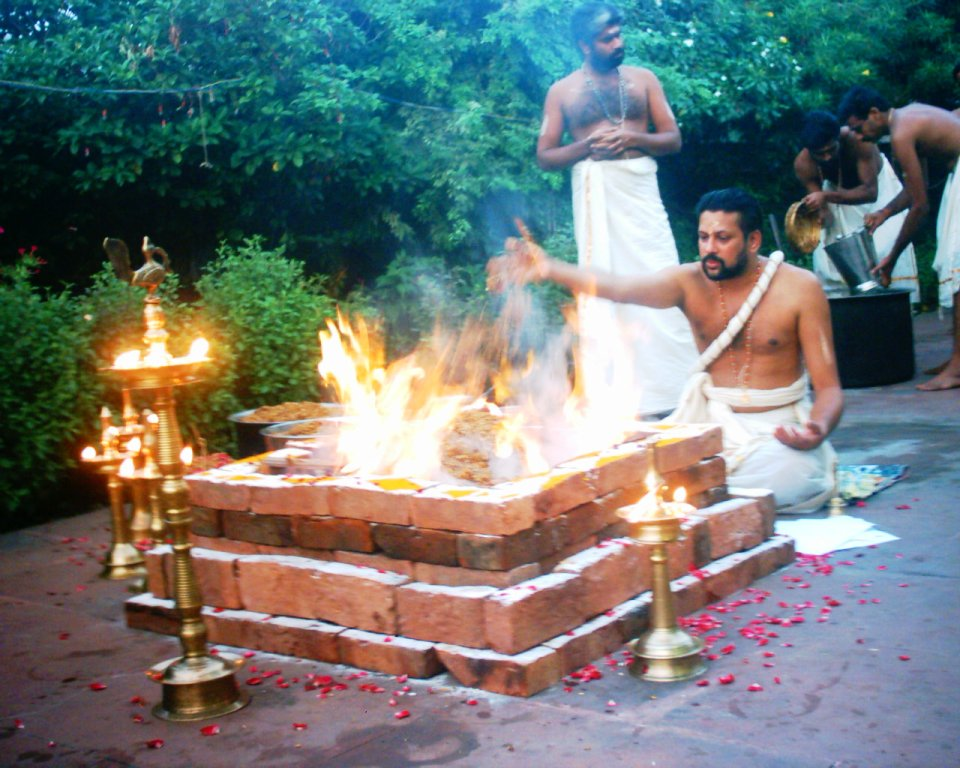
Nambūdiri Brahmin performing śrauta rites

Malayali Brahmins (Malayalam: മലയാളി ബ്രാഹ്മണർ, malayāḷi brāhmaṇar; also known as Malayala Brahmanar) or Kerala Brahmins are the group of Brahmins from the Indian state of Kerala. The proper Malayali Brahmin castes are the Nambudiri, and the Potti.

The Ambalavasi community such as Pushpaka Brahmin, Nambeeshan, Nambidi, Chakyar, Nambiar, Ilyathu, etc., are other semi-Brahmin castes. They are not directly involved in priestly duties but rather engaged in non-priestly temple activities.

Like ambalavasis, a higher section of Nairs which includes Pillais, Kurup and Menon comes under semi-Brahmin class mostly engaged in Kshatriya functions, administrative duties and control over temples, who have similar rights of Ambalavasi community.
