= Nayanar (Nair subcaste) =

Regions with significant populations
- North Malabar

Languages
- Malayalam

Religion
- Hinduism

Related ethnic groups
- Nambiar (Nair subcaste), Kurup (Nair caste), Nair

Nayanar (meaning "the Nayar") is an honorific title used by sub-castes of the Nair community from North Malabar, India. The word Nayanar is believed to have originated from the word "Nayanmar" meaning "Nairs", which is a title of nobility. Nayanar families are mostly seen north of the Korapuzha river. Like other Nairs from regions of North Malabar, such as Kannur and Kasaragod district, these Nayanars earlier claimed a higher status to the Nairs of the South Malabar regions, such as Kozhikode and the Kingdom of Valluvanad.

The Nayanar title is mostly given to prominent Nambiar families by the Chirakkal Raja. They sometimes have interchangeable surnames like Nambiar and Kurup. The Samantha Nairs of South Malabar, the Kaimals of Cochin, and the Pillais of Travancore are also considered similar castes to Nayanars.

== Position in society ==
The Nayanars were Samanthans, Kiryathils, Illathu Nairs and Naduvazhi (chiefs of chiefdoms and aristocrats) and Jenmimar (landed gentry).

== See also ==
- North Malabar
- Kannur district
- Korapuzha
