= Land reform in Kerala =

Aspect of the Indian state

Land reform in Kerala refers to a series of legislative and administrative measures implemented to restructure the agrarian system and dismantle the centuries-old feudal Janmi-Kudiyan system in the Indian state of Kerala.

The land reforms effectively ended the Janmi-Kudiyan (landlord-tenant) system, provided security of tenure to millions of cultivators, and granted ownership rights to hutment dwellers.

== Mythology ==
The traditional land tenure system in Kerala was rooted in the legend of Lord Parasurama. According to the Keralolpathi, Parasurama reclaimed Kerala from the sea and gifted the land to Namboothiri Brahmins. This mythological narrative established the concept of Janmam (birthright), asserting that Brahmins held absolute, divinely ordained proprietary rights over the soil

During the British colonial period, this mythological birthright was reinterpreted through Western legal lenses. Colonial courts treated the Janmam right as absolute private property, a move that codified ancient myths into rigid modern law. This granted Janmis the legal power to evict tenants—a practice that was traditionally restricted by customary "sharing" norms.

== History ==
=== Janmi-kudiyan System ===
The Hierarchy of the Janmi-kudiyan system:

- Janmi (Landlord) :Absolute owners holding the Janmam right; rarely engaged in physical farming..Traditionally Nambudiri and Nair chieftains.
- Kanakkaran (Intermediaries):Leased land from Janmis under Kanam tenure. They sub-leased this land to others and acted as powerful intermediaries.
- Kudiyan (Tenant): The actual cultivators who lived in constant fear of eviction. They paid heavy rents (35–75% of produce).
- Kudikidappukar (Hutment Dweller) :Landless laborers living in shacks on the landlord's property with no legal rights to their home site.

=== Regional Variations ===
Before the unification of Kerala in 1956, the three constituent regions - Malabar, Kochi, Travancore - operated under distinct administrative and land tenure system.

==== Malabar District ====
In Malabar, the British Ryotwari System was "grafted" onto the feudal structure. The British incorrectly recognized the Janmi as the absolute proprietor(Ryot).

- Janmi Dominance: The british legal system misinterpreted Janmom (birth) rights as private property, giving landlords legal backing to evict tenants arbitrarily.
- Verumpattakaran (Tenants-at-will): Who held land on short -term oral leases and faced constant threats of eviction (Melcharthu).
- Malabar Tenancy Act, 1929 : Severe agrarian distress in Malabar led to frequent uprisings, most notably the Malabar rebellion, which eventually faced the British to pass the Malabar Tenancy Act 1929.

==== Cochin Princely State ====
Land divided into Sirkar (State owned) and Janmon (Feudal)

- Verumpattamdars Act 1943:Providing fixity of tenure to a large section of cultivators.

==== Travancore Princly State ====
- Pattom Proclamation,1865:Often called the "Magna Carta of the Travancore Ryots," this decree converted the state owned (Sirkar) land into private property for the cultivators, creating a class of independent peasant proprietors early on.
- Jemikaram: While tenants on janmom lands (private estates) still faced issues the Jemikaram abolition Act,1958 eventually converted their feudal dues into a fixed payment to the state, effectively ending the landlord's direct control.

== Major Legislation ==
- Stay of Eviction Proceedings Ordinance,1957: An immediate measure to halt the arbitrary removal of tenants while comprehensive laws were drafted.
- Kerala Agrarian Relations Bill,1957:was a landmark piece of social legislation introduced by K. R. Gouri Amma, the Revenue Minister in the First Namboodiripad ministry. As the first major attempt to restructure the feudal Janmi-Kudiyan system in unified Kerala, the bill proposed a radical three-pronged approach: granting permanent fixity of tenure to tenants, regulating "fair rent" to prevent exploitation by landlords, and imposing a strict land ceiling to redistribute surplus land to the landless. The bill became a central flashpoint for the Vimochana Samaram, which eventually led to the dismissal of the Communist government in 1959. Although a modified version was passed by the Kerala Legislative Assembly in October 1960, it was subsequently struck down by the Kerala High Court as unconstitutional.
- The compensation for tenant's Improvement Act,1958: Provided legal backing for tenants to receive compensation for improvements (like irrigation or building) made to the land.
- Jenmikaram Abolition Act (1958): Aimed at abolishing feudal dues (Jenmikaram) paid by tenants to landlords in the Travancore and Cochin regions.
- Kerala Land Reforms (KLR) Act, 1963: A comprehensive act that established the machinery for implementation, including fixing fair rents and establishing land ceilings for individual holdings.
- Kerala Land Reforms (Amendment) Act, 1969: The definitive legislation that effectively ended landlordism by transferring ownership to cultivating tenants and granting ownership of homesteads to Kudikidappukars.

== The Kerala Land Reforms Act ==
Major provisions:

- Abolition of Landlordism:All intermediary rights between the state and the actual cultivator were abolished. Tenants became the owners of the land they farmed.
- Land Ceiling:The Act fixed a strict limit on the amount of land a family could own—roughly 12 to 15 acres depending on family size and land quality.
- Redistribution of Surplus:Land exceeding the ceiling was taken by the state and redistributed to landless agricultural laborers and Scheduled Castes/Tribes.
- Kudikidappu Rights:Hutment dwellers (laborers living on a small patch of a landlord's land) were given ownership of their homesteads (usually 3 to 10 cents of land)

== Socio-Ecomic impacts ==
- Social Justices: Homestead ownership freed labourers from eviction threats, giving them labor- market bargaining power and economic wellbeing.
- Human Development: Economic security allowed investment in education and health leading to high literacy and life expectancy.
- Caste Dismantling: The reform broke the "caste-land nexus," empowering marginalized communities who had been landless for centuries.

these reforms are widely regarded as the most successful and comprehensive in India, serving as a foundational pillar of the Kerala Model of Development.

== Disadvantage ==
- Fragmentation:The redistribution of land into tiny parcels made large-scale commercial farming difficult.
- Productivity:Small holders lacked the capital to maintain high yields, Leading an inefficient use of soil.
