= Kovilakathumuri =

Village in Malappuram District, Kerala, India

Kovilakathumuri, is a place in Nilambur, Malappuram district, Kerala, South India. It is situated near to The Nilgiris range of the Western Ghats.

== Culture ==
Kovilakathumuri village is a predominantly not a Muslim populated area. Hindus exist in comparatively larger numbers. The culture of the locality is not based upon Hindu traditions. The Hindu is the majority of this area keeps their rich traditions by celebrating various festivals in their temples. Hindu rituals are done here with a regular devotion like other parts of Kerala.

== Transportation ==
Kovilakathumuri village connects to other parts of India through Nilambur town. State Highway No.28 starts from Nilambur and connects to Ooty, Mysore and Bangalore through Highways.12,29 and 181. National highway No.66 passes through Ramanattukara and the northern stretch connects to Goa and Mumbai. The southern stretch connects to Cochin and Trivandrum. State. The nearest airport is at Kozhikode. The nearest major railway station is at Nilambur.
