= Menon (title) =

Indian honorific aristocratic hereditary title

Regions with significant populations
- Kerala, mostly in the South Malabar, Thrissur, Cochin and Palakkad regions

Languages
- Malayalam

Religion
- Hinduism

Menon (Malayalam: [meːnoːn]) is an aristocratic hereditary title of the Nair community bestowed by various kings of Kerala, most saliently the Zamorin of Calicut and the Maharaja of Cochin, upon eminent Nairs. The recipient of the title held it lifelong, and the male members of the family held it in perpetuity in the matrilineal line. Historically, the Menons were Jenmimar (feudal chieftains), with some of them being Naduvazhis (ruling elites). They were often engaged in various administrative and political duties, such as being ministers, accountants and advisors to the kings of Kerala.

Many members of the Menon subcaste are related to the Cochin royal family, the Zamorin of Calicut, the Paliam royal family, and the Kodungallur royal family, since the members of royal families in central Kerala were often married to aristocratic Nair families. Thus, the children of such Rajahs and Maharajahs held the 'Menon' title and passed it on to subsequent generations matrilineally. The Paliath Achans and the Shekhari Varmas also share the title.

== Etymology ==
The title Menon meaning a superior person comes from the words Mel, meaning above and avan, meaning he. "Mel-avan" soon became "Menavan" finally being contracted into the current form of usage of the title, that is, Menon. In the Cochin Kingdom, as Francis Day explains, when the Rajah intends to confer this honour, he salutes the person to whom he means to give it, by the title of Menon prefixed to his name, and should two other persons present, immediately address him in the same terms, the title is confirmed, if not he does not receive it. After becoming a Menon, he is called a Thampuran. As soon as a person was made a Menon, he was presented with an Ola(palmyra leaf) as a writing sheet and an iron style, as symbolic of the office he was expected to fill, i.e. of an accountant. The role of a Menon was connected to supervisory positions or that of a scribe and accountant in Palace or temple, preparing Grantha palm leaf manuscripts. Compared to the foot soldier Nair, these personnel were better educated, was closer in proximity to the ruler and were ordained or titled, with the title passing on through generations, in a matrilineal fashion.
