= Swaroopathil Nair =

Nair subcaste

Swaroopathil Nair is a subcaste belonging to the Nair community of Kerala, India. They are found only in Travancore, where they were the warriors and the Jenmimar (feudal lords). They were also involved in administrative duties in the Travancore region.

In Malabar, two related subcastes, Akathu Charna Nairs and Purathu Charna Nairs, are treated as equivalent to Swaroopathil Nairs in caste hierarchy. They have different subgroups, including Parisha Menon, Pattola Menon, and Menoky. The Charna Nairs constitute the largest Nair population in Malabar.

== See also ==
- Illathu Nair
- Demographics of Nair community
- Kiryathil Nair
- Nair Brigade
- Nayanar (Nair subcaste)
- Menon (title)
