= Thirumulpad =

Hindu Kshatriya title used in North and Central Kerala, India

Tirumalpād or Thirumalpād is a Hindu Kshatriya title used in North and Central Kerala, India. The title is used by multiple subdivisions of Samanthan Nair and Samanta Kshatriya as well as by some Namboothiri clans.

Sāmantha Thirumalpād is investituted with a sacred thread and observes customs and manners exactly similar to other Samantan Nairs. In contrast, the Samanta Kshatriya Thirumalpāds wear the sacred thread, performing vedic rites.

== Distinction ==
The Thirumulpāds of the Samanta Kshatriya stock are further divided into two classes (Sripurogamas who are the attendants at the Raja's palace) and the Audvāhikas (who perform wedding ceremony for certain castes). Both these, however, are identical people, though varying in their traditional occupations. Their females are called Nambashtadiri. They are mostly found in Cochin.

Thirumulpād of the Sāmantha stock include clans of the Karnamulpād of Manjeri and Thirumulpād of Nilambur. The ladies belonging to this caste are known as Kolpad or Koilamma. They are mostly found in and around South Malabar.

Most important of the Kshatriya clans who use this title in South Malabar are the second to fifth line of successors to the Zamorin's throne. The second and third line of successors, known as Ernād Ilamkur Nambiyāthiri Thirumulpād and Ernād Moonnāmkur Nambiyāthiri Thirumulpād are located in the Principality of Ernād, while Itattoornad Nambiyathiri Thirumulpād and Nediyiruppu Moottaratti Thirumulpād are located further south. All these clans belong to the Eradi subdivision of Nair.

== See also ==
- Samanthan Nair
- Kshatriya
