= Eradi =

Subcaste of Nair community in Kerala

Eradi is a subcaste of the Eradi Nair and Kiriyathil Nair communities from the Eranad of Malabar, who they were elevated to the Samanthan Nair caste by performing the Padmagarbha Yagna. The Samoothiri (Zamorin), the erstwhile hereditary rulers of the kingdom of Kozhikode, belong to this subcaste. They derive their name from the erstwhile province of Eranad, where they were the ruling chiefs. The Eradi or Samoothiri first tried to elevate himself to the Samanthan Kshatriya status by performing the Hiranyagarbha Yagna, but fierce opposition by his opponents (Most notable of whom were the Rajas of Cochin) forced the Namboothiris of Malabar to abandon the plan. Later, the Samoothiri was elevated to the Samanthan Nair caste by performing the Padmagarbha Yagna.

== See also ==
- Justice V. Balakrishna Eradi
- Nair
