= Madampi (Nair title) =

Feudal landlord in pre-independence south India

Madampi or Madambi (equivalent to "Lord" in English), plural Madampimār, is the Malayalam term used to refer to the landed aristocracy of Kerala, used by the uppermost Nair subdivisions. Pillai is the main title used by the Madampi. They were mostly found in the kingdoms of Jaisimhanadu and Venad (Travancore Kingdom). The Madampis served as the Jenmimar (feudal landlords) and had their own Nair armies during the pre-independence era. They held authority within their respective regions and also had the right to adjudicate provincial disputes, often exercising greater judicial power than the kings themselves. Their power was severely reduced after the Communist government passed the Land Reforms Ordinance.

The title "Madampi" was also used in Cochin, to denote the Nair and Nambudiri chiefs who ruled under the Maharajah of Cochin. A few Nambuthiri landlord families, most notable of whom were those in Vanjipuzha and Makilanjeri, were also given the Madampi title. In Cochin, the Madampis also had their own armies, but seldom numbered more than 100. Their power was only a little bit higher than that of the Naduvazhis (regional rulers). Madampis supplied chieftains along with soldiers in times of war to the king.

== See also ==
- Eshmanan
- Pillai
- Travancore
- Nayanar
- Thakur
