= Pillai (Kerala title) =

Royal title in Kerala, India

Regions with significant populations
- Kerala

Languages
- Malayalam, Sanskrit

Religion
- Hinduism (Brahmin and Kshatriya)

Related ethnic groups
- Madampi, Jenmi, Rajputs, Malayali Brahmins

Pillai, (Malayalam: [piɭːai̯]) meaning "Prince", is a title of nobility which can either refer to a ruling chief, members of the nobility, or junior princes of the royal family, and was mostly used by Nairs who were the Jenmimar (feudal chieftains). They were historically ranked as or immediately below the king. The title was also sometimes used by Nambudiris. The oldest lineages of Pillais include not only Kshatriyas but also Brahmins who took up the sword. From the early modern period, the title also came to be bestowed upon Savarna subjects by the kings of Kerala for military services and politics, and most of them were of Nair origin.

== Etymology and Origin ==
According to epigraphic records, it is an ancient title, given to junior members of the royal family. Originally a title meaning "royal child", it came to be given to administrators of temples; often holding large estates on behalf of the latter.

Early English records also address these hereditary ruling chiefs as the princes of Kerala ranking below the monarch. The most well known are the Pillais of the Eight Nair Noble Houses, the Ettuveettil Pillamar of Travancore, were extremely influential in the past, often had greater power and influence than the Raja.

== History ==
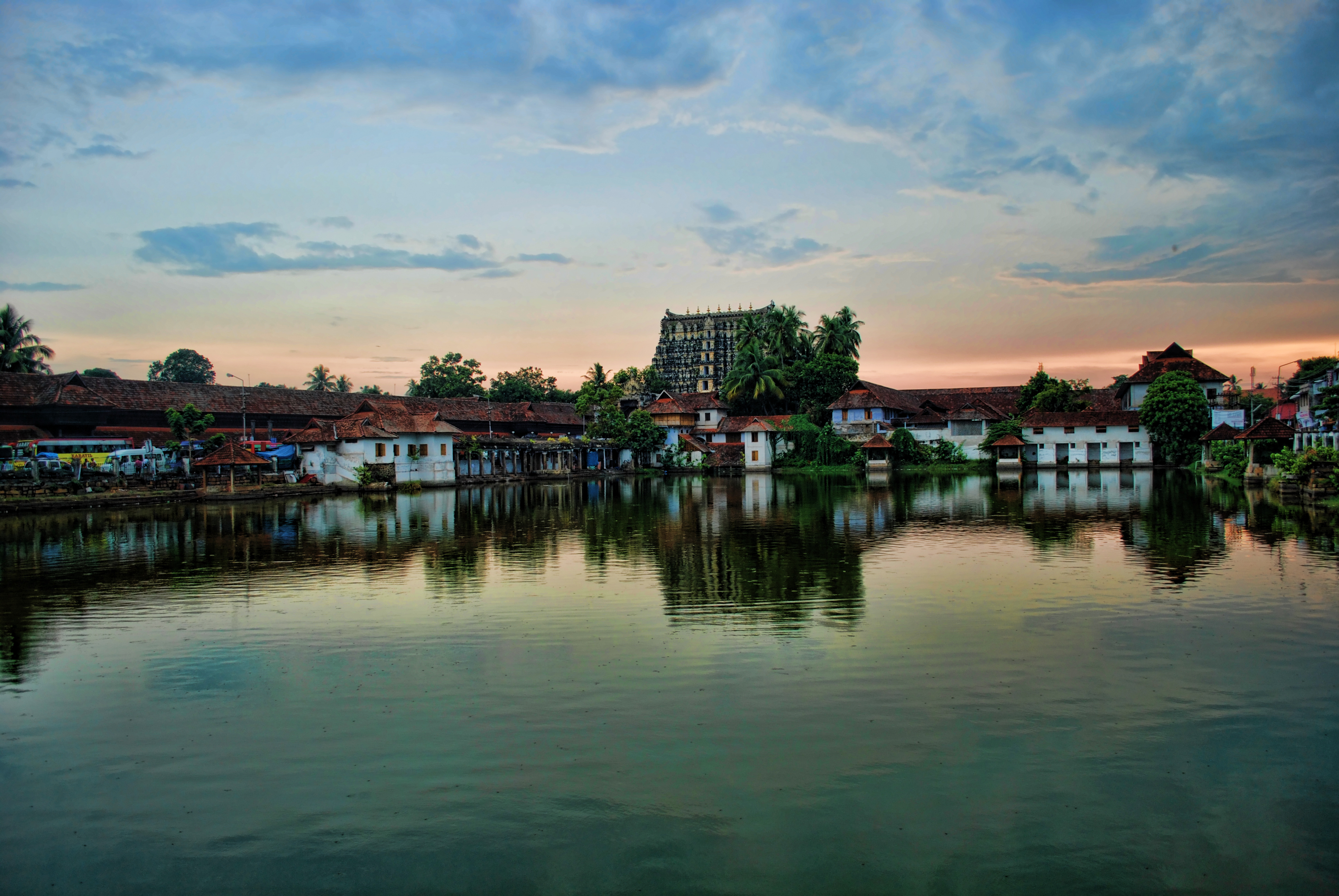
Padmanabhaswamy Temple, The temple associated with Ettara Yogam (Nair-Brahmin alliance)

Originally, they were Samantha Nair royal families of Kerala, related to one another through the swaroopams of Travancore. Over time, some of these families became extinct or were supplanted by the elite families of their prominent Nayar retainers. The matriarchal heads of the Travancore Royal Family took their consorts from these chiefs, and successive rulers were their descendants. Following the arrival of refugee princes from Northern Malabar, fleeing the invasion of Tipu Sultan, these princes were elevated to the status of Koyi Thampuran and granted estates previously held by deposed chiefs.

Some desoms were grouped together under a prince into larger units that represented earlier independent kingdoms. The Pillais of Kerala held authority over their respective regions and had the right to pass judgment in provincial disputes, often more so than the kings themselves. They also collected taxes and, in times of war, led the king's armies. Many Pillais originally functioned essentially as royal governors.

Their power decreased after King Marthanda Varma took control and established the state of Travancore in the 1750s. The unification of Travancore came at the cost of the ruling chiefs' authority. Marthanda Varma also gave the seized estates to new owners, like in the case of Kilimanoor, and created new titles to reward his friends and allies for their military or political support.

In 1891, the Malayali Memorial, a memorandum signed by more than 10,000 people including Muslims and Christians, was submitted to the Maharaja Sree Moolam Thirunal by a qualified barrister, Parameswaran Pillai of Pallipuram on behalf of the people of Kerala, demanding administrative reforms, primarily better representation of the former ruling castes like Nairs of Kerala in the new administrative machinery of the state.

In 1948, shortly after Indian Independence and Travancore's accession to the Indian Union, a people's government was formed by the State Congress party under Thanu Pillai of Pattom, who had for over two decades agitated for responsible government. One of the first modifications they made to the erstwhile Government House and Secretariat was to install a statue of Velu Thampi Dalawa son of Kunjumayitti Pillai of Kalkulam in the forecourt.

Despite the changes in political power, a loose connection between Pillais and desoms remained for a long time after authority had moved over to the peishcars (those who assumed responsibility for the collector/magistrate/police superintendent) and proverticars (village officers). An official defining characteristic of a Pillai still consisted of the receipt of the revenues of justice of a desom, which later became a fixed sum. Many still held large estates that were absolute tax-free freeholds.

== Usage ==
=== Medieval Kerala ===
Pillais (Lord of Lord's or Prince), Madampis (Naduvazhi) and Naluvitans (Barons) of old Kollam (present-day Kollam, parts of Pathanamthitta and Alappuzha districts) and Thiruvananthapuram region held the title of Pillai. They held their titles in perpetuity along with their family names rather than with their personal names. Their family names were derived from the areas they administered. Commoners were to address Pillais as "Thampuran" (meaning 'My Lord) and women as "Thampuratti".

The hierarchy or order of titles of medieval Kerala
1. Varma - Members of a royal family or King
2. Pillai - Lord of lord's (Semi-Royal Nair families or Governors of land and one who has rights to collect tax)
3. Madampi - Jenmi or Naduvazhi (Landlords under the Pillai)
4. Naluvitan - Deshavazhi (Rulers of small regions under the Madampi)

According to Mark de Lannoy, at one time, prominent Pillais in the region near the Padmanabhaswamy Temple included six Nairs, a Brahmin (Pillai Idathara Potti) and a Kshatriya (Pillai Ilampel Pandarathil). The most influential among them were Ettuveettil pillamar. The Queen of Travancore would take husbands from among these Lords. The Padmanabhapuram Palace was constructed by a king named Iravi Pillai Iravi Varma Kulasekhara Perumal in A.D. 1601.

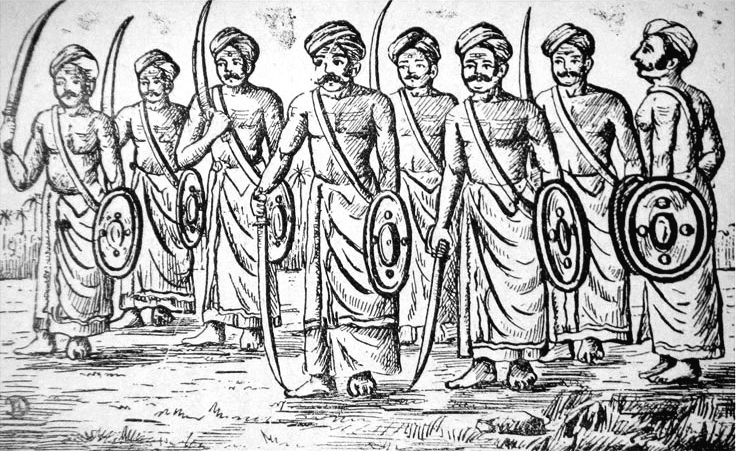
Ettuveetil Pillamar

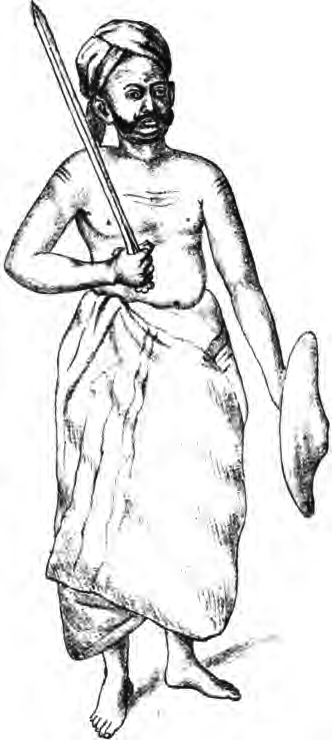
An Ettuveettil Pillai

Kurup, Kaimal, Karthav and Thampi are other similar titles that held significance in various medieval Kerala kingdoms.

=== Travancore era ===
After Marthanda Varma's execution of more than 70 Barons, Nobles, Chiefs across Travancore, in 1730, he implemented new laws to completely abolish the largest feudal system in Kerala, thereby reducing the influence of the feudal lords and seizing much of their land. Marthanda Varma made the title of 'Pillai' to the highest rank of honor in his Travancore Kingdom. It was conferred upon distinguished Nairs in recognition of their bravery or significant achievements, through a ceremonial process known as Thirumukom Pidikkuka. According to a noted historians, the title was later demoted and came to be granted more commonly to decorate soldiers upon payment of the "Adiyara" from the time of Maharaja Anizham Tirunal Marthanda Varma who had previously subdued the power of the Pillais of the Eight Houses Ettuveettil Pillamar and annexed their territories. This has resulted in the title being rather common rather than only among the highest echelons of Nair society in modern Kerala. The title of Pillai was then on granted to an individual for life upon payment of a fee known as "Adiyara" whose successors including women would be by courtesy titled Pillais. Inspire of this, to subdue the influence of these nobles, Marthanda Varma was to invent more new titles.

The new titles of Travancore introduced by Marthanda Varma
1. Chempakaraman Pilla - Head of Nobles
2. Meleluttu Pillai - Accountant General
3. Rayasam Pillai - Keeper of the Seal
4. Pandara Pillai - Head of the Maharajah's Bodyguard
5. Kaimal Pillai - Chancellor
6. Valia Sarvadhikaryakkar Pilla - Justice General
7. Kurup Pilla - High Steward

The Great Officers of the State Establishment until the latter half of the 19th century consisted of the Meleluttu Pillai (Accountant General), the Rayasam Pillai (Keeper of the Seal), several Rayasams and Kanakku Pillais respectively below them. These often hereditary offices of state were the highest positions below the Royal Household, being the Kaimal (Chancellor), the Kurup of Travancore (High Steward) and the Valia Sarvadhikaryakkar Pillai (Justice-General and Prime Minister). Pandara Pillamar : Royal pages; they also formed the primary officers of the Maharajah's Bodyguard before 1730. The brigade existed till 1950 but consisted of European trained officers post 1730.

Managers of these 7 royal Pillais called Kanakku Pilla, who cannot use the Pillai surname, but use Kanakku as Pre-name. The title was bestowed through a formal ceremony known as Thirumukom Pidikkuka i.e. holding the face of the King and included the payment of a fee known as Adiyara to the King. A person thus bestowed with this title now secured the honorific title of Pillai suffixed and the distinctive title of Kanakku (meaning accountant in Malayalam) prefixed to his name. However Kanakku and Pillai were never used together. E.g.: either a person, Krishnan, would be referred to as Krishnan Pillai or Kanakku, followed by his maternal uncle's name, and Krishnan. The latter style was used in royal writs and communications. During the Travancore-Mysore War the forces of Mysore under Tipu Sultan were defeated by a sudden attack under the leadership of General Kali Kutty Nair who was posthumously elevated to the dignity of Pillaidom as Kali Kutty Pillai.

The Ruling Chiefs before the formation of the state of Travancore by Marthanda Varma are known by their family names and those elevated by Marthanda Varma or after use the title as a suffix to their given name. A Pillai (plural Pillamar) has the title Pillai of [X] when the title originates from a placename and Pillai is added as a suffix when the title comes from descent. In either case, he is referred to as Pillai [X]. Women can hold the latter title in their own right and her husband does not have a title (unless he has one in his own right).

The nephews of a Pillai, are entitled to use a courtesy title, usually the highest of his uncle's lesser titles (if any). The heir to a Pillaidom, and indeed any level of aristocratic peerage, is styled Senior (Mootha) Pillai of [X], and successive nephews as Junior (Elaya) or Kumara Pillai of [X].

== Notable people ==
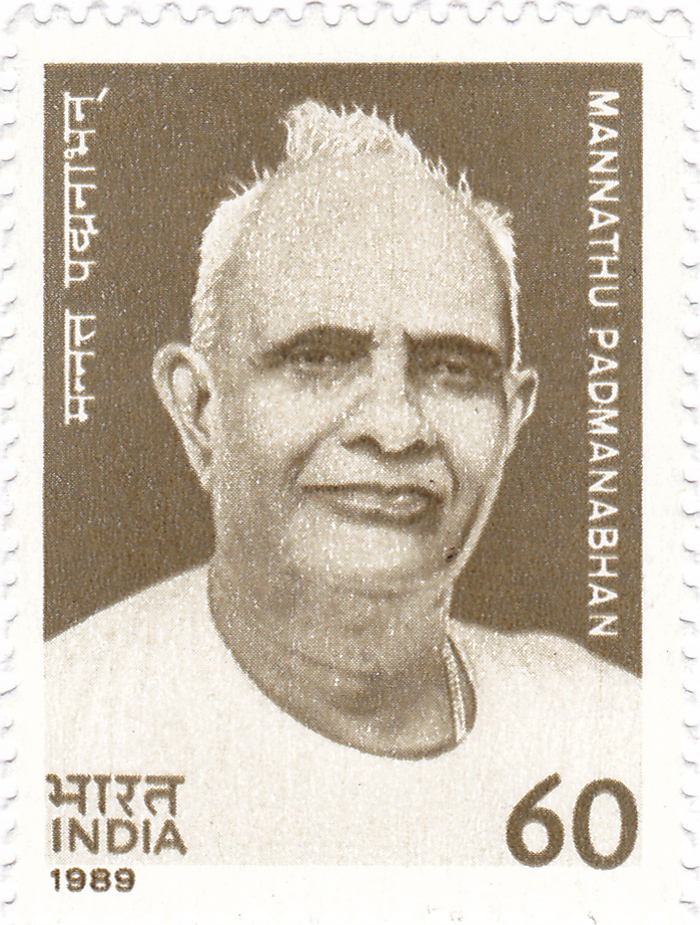
Mannathu Padmanabha Pillai, founder of the Nair Service Society (NSS)

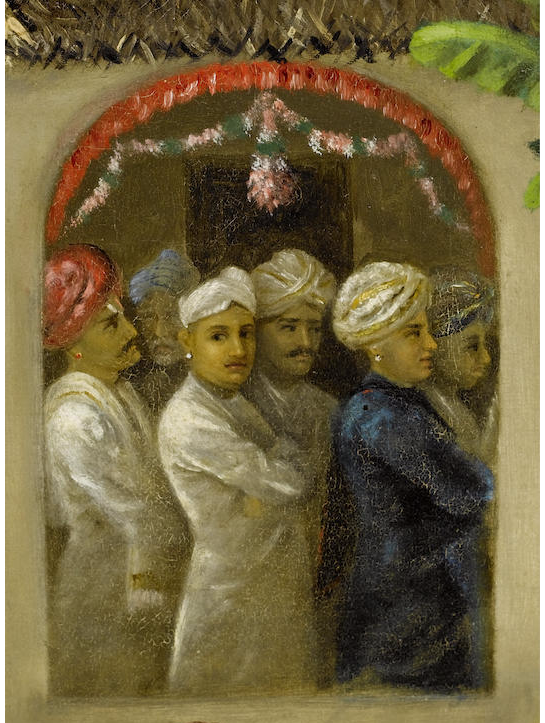
Kesava Pillai of Kandamath, Zamindar of Travancore

- Rama Varma Kunji Pillai Thampuran (Sakthan Thampuran), King of Cochin
- Raja Kesavadas alias Kesava Pillai, Dewan of Travancore
- Gopal Krishna Pillai, Indian Administrative Service (I.A.S) officer and the former Home Secretary in the Government of India
- Mannathu Padmanabha Pillai, Indian social reformer and freedom fighter
- Kumbalathu Sanku Pillai, social reformer and founder of the Nair Service Society (NSS)
- Kollam G. K. Pillai, Indian actor
- N. N. Pillai, Indian Actor, playwright, theater director, orator, lyricist, Field Propaganda Unit Commanding Officer of a 58-member Team of INA
- Iravikkutti Pillai, commander-in-chief of Venadu Kingdom
- Divya Pillai, Indian actress and model
- Rajeev Pillai, Indian actor and model
- Thakazhi Sivasankara Pillai, Indian author and historian
- Nisha Pillai, Indian journalist based in London
- Aiyappan Pillai, Indian writer, politician and lawyer
- Neeta Pillai, Indian actress and model
- Kesava Pillai of Kandamath, Zamindar and member of the Sree Moolam Popular Assembly

== See also ==
- Ettuveetil Pillamar
- Ettara Yogam
- Nair Brigade
- Nair Service Society
