= Nambiar (Nair subcaste) =

Indian caste

Regions with significant populations
- North Kerala

Languages
- Malayalam, Sanskrit

Related ethnic groups
- Kurup, Nayanar, Nair

Nambiār, also known as Nambiyār, is a subcaste of the Nair caste in Kerala, India. The majority of them were the Jenmimar (feudal landlords) of the Malabar region.

In earlier days, Nambiar women, like most women of Nair clans of North Malabar (present-day Kannur, Kasaragod, Wayanad districts) would not marry Nair men of South Malabar (present-day Kozhikode, Malappuram, Palakkad, Thrissur districts).

== Notable people ==
- A. C. N. Nambiar – Indian Nationalist
- Ayillyath Kuttiari Gopalan Nambiar – politician
- E. P. Jayarajan Nambiar – politician
- K. P. P. Nambiar – businessman
- P. M. Kunhiraman Nambiar – freedom fighter
- M. N. Nambiar – actor
- Kannavath Sankaran Nambiar – richest Landlord
- Rahul Nambiar – singer
- P. K. Venugopalan Nambiar – agricultural scientist
- Satish Nambiar – retired Indian army general
- Bejoy Nambiar – director
