= Samantan =

Samantan Nair
Regions with significant populations
- Kerala

Languages
- Malayalam, Sanskrit

Religion
- Hinduism

Related ethnic groups
- Illathu Nairs, Samantha Kshatriya, Kiryathil Nairs, Swaroopathil Nair

Samantan, also known as Samanthan Nair or Samantha Kshatriya (meaning "Kshatriyas without Vedic rituals" or "equal to"), was a generic term applied to dignify a group of sub-clans among the Naduvazhi (ruling elites) and Jenmimar (feudal lords) of the Nair community in Kerala, India.

== Origin and history ==
The earliest mention of the origin of the Samantan is found in the ancient texts of Kerala which states that Parashurama is believed to have killed Kshatriya from multiple clans 21 times as part of fulfilling a divine duty. Some Kshatriyas, fearful of Parashurama, fled to foreign lands and, in the process, ceased observing traditional caste practices. Many of them eventually came to the Malabar Coast (present-day Kerala) and sought refuge with Cheraman Perumal, who ruled a region between central and southern Kerala at the time. Cheraman Perumal, with the consent of the Brahmins and following the traditions established by his royal predecessors, granted these refugee Kshatriyas protection. Thus, a new caste known as the Samantan caste was formed. The term Samantan (Saa-Manthran) meaning "without mantras or rituals," referring to Kshatriyas who no longer observed orthodox Vedic rituals.

The Samantans (Kshatriyas) were not originally part of the Nair caste, but over time, they gradually integrated into the elite subdivisions of the Nairs. According to the 17th-century text Keralolpathi, the Nairs migrated to Kerala sometime between or after the 9th and 12th centuries, marking the end of the Chera dynasty, recent studies suggest that the Nairs share their ancestry with modern-day northwest Indian populations and are descendants of ancient North-west Indian migrants who migrated to the southwest coast.

The integration of Samantans with elite Nair clans led to the emergence of the superior Nair sub-groups, often referred to as Samantan or Samantan Nairs. These groups held high social status and were commonly known as Koiladhikaris, meaning "temple authorities" or administrators of temples. Samantan Nairs also served as Naduvazhis, or regional governors, across various parts of Kerala. They held significant political and ritual authority in their respective territories. Common titles among them included Adikal, Thiruvadikal or Raja (King), as well as region-specific honorifics such as Unniyadhiri or Unithiri (North Malabar), Adiyodi (Malabar), Pillai (Venadu), Kidavu (Malabar), Thirumalpad (South Malabar). Many of these Samantan lineages have either become extinct or have been assimilated into the elite subdivisions of the Nair caste.

== Subdivisions ==
They were divided into three groups:

- Samantan Kshatriya – Royal families who had Brahminical acceptance and performed traditional Vedic rituals, or were elevated through the Hiranyagarbha ceremony.
- Samantan – Kshatriyas without Brahminical rituals, now extinct or assimilated similarly to the Nairs.
- Samantan Nair – Clans formed by the merging of Samantan and Nair families, as well as children born of unions between Samantha Kshatriya Maharaja and Nair women; also known as Samantha Nairs.

== Clans Elevated to Samantha Kshatriya, Samantan or Samanthan Nair ==
In medieval Kerala, Brahmins and Kshatriya rulers often performed elaborate and expensive rituals—such as Hiranyagarbha and Padmagarbha—to reclaim or reinforce their lost varna status or to gain Brahminical support for political legitimacy. While these rituals were not universally practiced or deemed necessary across all parts of Kerala, they were used to reinforce Brahminical social structures and hierarchy.

The Samantan Kshatriya status came to be regarded as one of the highest social ranks in Kerala, positioned above the Samantans and Samantan Nairs in the traditional caste hierarchy. Over time, many royal clans from diverse backgrounds were absorbed into this classification, leading to the emergence of distinct groups such as the Samantans and Samantan Nairs, who held elite status within the broader Nair community.

Some of the notable clans that attained this elevated status, ranked from highest to lowest, include:

- Perumpadappu Swarupam, belonging to the highest Surya Kshatriya lineage and known as the Cochin Royal Family, is believed to be the first community to receive the Samantan Kshatriya status. The Cochin dynasty traditionally claims that their lineage originated from the daughter of the last niece of Cheraman Perumal.
- Venadu Swaroopam is a Samantan Kshatriya Swaroopam, similar to the Cochin Royal Family. This royal house had different branches located near Venadu, Kalkulam and Kayamkulam region. The Venattatikal branch of Venadu Swaroopam is believed to have originated from the Kulasekhara lineage, descended from the son of the last Chera emperor. Many of their heirs later became extinct, and the southern Venadu region subsequently adopted heirs from the Kolathiri dynasty, who were of Samantan origin. These adopted heirs performed the Hiranyagarbha ritual to temporarily elevate themselves to the status of Koyi Thampuran, considered the highest rank among the Samantan Kshatriyas. This lineage eventually became known as the Travancore Royal Family.
- Kolathunadu Swaroopam — The Kolathiri dynasty of Kolathunadu traces its origins from Samantans of the Mushika dynasty from the Ezhimala region. In 1617 A.D., Kolathiri Raja Udayavarman sought to elevate his status further to Soma Kshatriya by performing the Hiranyagarbha ritual. However, this request was refused by the local Nambudiri Brahmins. As a result, Udayavarman invited 237 Brahmin families, known as Sāgara Dwijas, from Gokarnam and settled them in five Desams: Cheruthazham, Kunniriyam, Arathil, Kulappuram, and Vararuchimangalam of Perinchelloor Grāmam. These Brahmins adopted Nambudiri customs, performed the Hiranyagarbha ritual, and subsequently conferred Kshatriyahood on the Kolathiri rulers.
- Eradis, Vellodis and Nedungodis — The Zamorin of Calicut was originally known as the Eradi, ruler of Eranad, before shifting his headquarters from Nediyiruppu to Kozhikode. The Eradis were ordinary Nair chieftains of the Eranad region, a subdivision of Eranad in Malabar. They were closely related to the Raja of Valluvanad known as Vellodis or Vellathiri and Nedungodis of neighboring areas. The Zamorin was elevated to the Samantan Nair caste by performing the Padmagarbha Yagna. The women are referred to as Kovilamma.

common titles used by these families included the uniform surname Varma, related families were often known by titles such as Thirumalpad, Thampuran, Thampan, Thampi, Karthav, etc.

Many local communities in South Canara, Karnataka, and the Bengal region call themselves 'Samanta Kshatriyas,' although they are generally distinct from the Samantha Kshatriyas of Kerala.
