= Jenmi =

Aristocracy of Kerala

Jenmi or Janmi (Malayalam: [dʒenmi, dʒɐnmi]), plural Jenmimar, is the Malayalam term used to refer to the landed aristocracy of Kerala, India, who traditionally held their lands as absolute and allodial owners, with such lands known as Jenmom or Janmam. They formed the landowning nobility as well as the landed gentry of the region in colonial times, and the majority of the estates and feudal properties were owned by this community. They predominantly belonged to the Nair and Nambudiri (Brahmin priest) castes.

== History ==
The twenty-two families paying 3,000 rupees or more in land revenue to the Crown held 620,012 acres among them; the Vengayil dynasty alone accounted for 200,000 acres, followed immediately by the Mannarghat and Kavalappara Moopil Nairs, whose respective swaroopams governed 180,000 acres and 155,358 acres.

The Zamorin of Calicut owned between 60,000 and 90,000 acres of Jenmom estate lands, followed by the Raja of Kollengode with 82,000 acres of forest and 18,000 acres of farmland. The Nilambur Thirumalpad's swaroopam spanned 80,000 acres, generating 273,075 rupees in 1925. The Koothali Moopil Nair family held at least 47,000 acres, likely more, as they had transferred significant land, including the Changaroth estate, to their Vengayil daughter as a wedding gift. to match the donation of Kuttiyadi by the groom's father, the Kolathiri Raja, from the Kadathanadu swaroopam.

Temples like The Padmanabhaswamy Temple was controlled and owned by the Nair Jenmis, known as Ettuveettil Pillamar, and their associates, Ettarayogam, until the 17th century, the Koodalmanikyam Temple (controlled by the Thachudaya Kaimal) and the Guruvayoor Temple of M. R. Ry. were built on lands owned by these Brahmin and Nair aristocrats.

The Maharajas of Cochin and Travancore, along with other rulers like the Punjar in Travancore and the Paliath Achans in Cochin, were known for their large feudal estates. The exact acreage controlled by the Paliam swaroopam is unknown, but a 1956 partition suit allocated over 100,000 rupees to 213 family members, with additional funds reserved for administration and temple maintenance. At that time, the Paliam family had 12,000 tenants and owned 41 temples.

Other notable Jenmis included the Kurumathoor Namburidipad (5,615 acres), the Kalliat Nambiars (36,779 acres), the Chirakkal Raja (32,082 acres), and the K.T. Moopil Nair family (at least 25,000 acres).

== End of the Feudal System in Kerala ==
In the 17th century, the ascension of Marthanda Varma as the king of Travancore took place. The Venadu region of Travancore, where the most feudal lords existed and the feudal system of Kerala was reached its peak. Varma violated the principal custom and rules of Kerala, which stated that " a Nair lord should not be punished with death", by executing the powerful feudal lords of Travancore known as the Ettuveetti Pillamar and their allies—more than 70 nobles and madampis across Travancore. He implemented new laws to completely abolish the feudal system in Travancore. The Nair army was reorganized in the European style, transforming from a feudal-based force into a standing army.

In 1701, A treaty was signed between Cochin and Travancore, which included a clause stating that Travancore would assist Cochin in suppressing the nobles and feudals of Cochin.

In 1766, Muslim armies from Mysore invaded the northern region of Malabar. Hindu-Muslim clashes occurred in 1766 and 1789, during which many Hindus, especially Nairs, were captured or killed by the forces of Tipu Sultan. As a result, the power of the feudal system in the north-central region of Malabar districts region was reduced.

In the 18th century, British influence in the 18th century further reduced the power of the remaining Nair feudals. The British imposed additional limitations on Nair dominance and feudalism. After signing the Treaty of Subsidiary Alliance with Travancore in 1795, British residents were placed within the Travancore administration. This interference from the British led to two rebellions in 1804 and 1809, the latter of which had lasting repercussions. Velu Thampi, the Nair Dewan of Travancore, led a revolt in 1809 aimed at removing British influence from the Travancore government.

In 1914, the Nair Service Society (NSS) was founded by Mannathu Padmanabha Pillai. Growing up in poverty and witnessing widespread domestic disarray, along with growing communal slights against the Nairs, the rise to prominence of the Saint Thomas Christians during British rule, and land alienation among the Nairs, motivated Padmanabhan to establish the NSS, which was supported by prominent leaders like K. Kelappan Nair. The organization aimed to address these issues by creating educational institutions and welfare programs for the Nairs.

In Present-day, however, there are restrictions placed on the amount of land one can own in Kerala. A token pension is normally paid to Jenmis who have ceded their lands, but the Government of Kerala has refused to do so from time to time.

== Organised violence against Jenmis ==
There have been several incidences of violence against Jenmis, influenced by Communists.

Kayyur Incident: Kayyur is a small village in Hosdurg taluk. In 1940, peasants there under the leadership of communists rose against the two local Jenmis, Nambiar of Kalliat and the Nayanar of Karakkatt Edam. Several people were killed in the conflict and four Communist leaders were found guilty and hanged by the government. A fifth instigator was sentenced to life imprisonment and was spared from the death penalty, since he was under the age of criminal liability.

Mattannur Incident: Mattanur witnessed large scale communal riots between the Moplah tenants and their Nair landlords during 1852. The riots started when an armed band of 200 Moplahs entered the house of the local landlord, Kalathil Kesavan Thangal, and massacred his entire family of 18 members. The rioters then decided to eliminate the most powerful Jenmi in the district, Kalliat Anandan Nambiar. However, their plans were somehow leaked and the landlord fled with his family, leaving his nephew Kalliat Kammaran Nambiar to defend the land. Kammaran Nambiar organized a militia of 300 Nair warriors and waited for the rioters. The unsuspecting rioters were ambushed and massacred, and the tenants were forced to abandon their campaign and disband.

Korom Incident: Another historic movement was at Korom village in Payyanur on 12 April 1948. Farmers from Payyanur Farka marched to the rice godown of the landlord, Aalakkat Mavila Kunhambu Nambiar, and took control of it and distributed the rice stored there among them. The Malabar Special Police force arrested the volunteers, including K P Kunhikkannan, the leader of the "Karshaka Sangham", upon the request of the landlord. To protest against these arrests, people marched to the spot where the volunteers were kept under police custody. The police started firing on the procession, and this resulted in the death of a harijan youth named Pokkan, who became the first martyr in Payyanur Farka during the 1948 movement.

== See also ==
- Malabar rebellion
- Ettuveetil Pillamar
- Kesava Pillai of Kandamath
- Moopil Nair
- Mannarghat Nair
- Pulleri Illathu Madhusoodanan Thangal
