= Unni (Indian name) =

Unni is a given name, surname, or caste title prevalent in the Indian state of Kerala.

Unni is used as a first name or surname in Kerala, India. In the Malayalam language, it is also used as an adjective meaning "child."

Historically, it was used as a title denoting a "royal child" or "sacred child" by uppermost members of the traditional Hindu community. Common derivatives of this title include Unnikal, Unnithan, Unnithiri, Pushpakan Unni, Brāhmani Unni, Tiyattunni, Nambeeshan Unni and Pattar Unni.

Today, Unni is widely used as a personal name. Names such as Unnikrishnan and Unnikannan refer to Lord Krishna in his child or infant form, while Unniyesu refers to Jesus (known as Yesu in Malayalam) in his infant form.

The word "Unni" is currently used as a personal name among various Hindu communities in the southern Indian state of Kerala, irrespective of caste.

== Origin & history of the historic title "Unni" ==
The surname or title Unni is closely related to the Pillai (or Pilla) title of Kerala. Historically, it is associated with the Cochin and Kollam (Quilon) royal families of the Suryavanshi Kshatriya lineage, where it originally indicated a "child" of the royal family. Over time, this title was granted to their Nair relatives, as well as to the Naduvazhi (vassal kings) and Deshavazhi (district governors) families of the kingdom.

In certain kingdoms like Kayamkulam, these aristocratic families were known as Unni. Because of their relationship to the Kayamkulam royal lineage, they were addressed as Thankal, leading to the compound titles Unni Thankal or Unnithan. Depending on the region, variations such as Unni, Unnithiri, Unnittiri, Pillayathiri, and Kidavu were used, all of which denote a "Sacred Child" or "Royal Child".

Historically, the term Unni carried a sacred connotation among the uppermost members of the traditional Hindu community. Beyond the ruling Nair classes, it is commonly used by Brahmins and Ambalavasi communities of Kerala.

- Namboothiri Brahmins: Unni is commonly used as a term of endearment or name for male children. The Namboothiris constituted a core part of the traditional, orthodox feudal elite. As Jenmimar (landlords), they owned vast areas of land across the Malabar District, a section of them also serves as priests in Namboothiri temples and those of higher-subcaste Nairs.
- Ilayathus: "Unni" is used as a name or title for male children of Ilayathus. Ilayathu/Elayadh are of Nambudiri origin but were treated as a separate caste because they served as priests for their service class Nair subcaste in the Malabar District. Consequently, they were considered a distinct community within the broader Nambudiri community. The difference between an Ilayathu and a Nambudiri was that Ilayathus were a priestly class who served the Nairs, Brahmins, and Ambalavasi communities, while Nambudiris were primarily an elite landlord class of Brahmins who performed priestly services for Nairs, Brahmins, and Ambalavasis on special occasions. Today, they migrated to Travancore and different parts of Malabar provide priestly services to all Nairs including higher and Service class. Over time, this community divided into two groups: the Onnām Parisha and the Randām Parisha. The Onnam Parisha provide priestly services only to the Illam Nairs (the highest Nair subcaste), while the Randam Parisha serve all other subcastes, including higher, Service class Nairs and certain Ambalavasi subcastes.
- Ambalavasi (Temple-Servant) Castes: It is frequently found among a section of this community that performs priestly duties and traditionally follows Marumakkathayam (matrilineal) inheritance laws. This includes groups such as the Brahmani Unni, Pushpaka Unni, Nambeesan, Theeyattunni, and Pattar Unni. They are a part of the Pushpaka Brahmins and Ambalavasi community in Kerala. Theeyattunnis are traditionally the performers of an ancient art form called Theeyatt. Theeyattunnis have the right for Tantric Poojas and other privileges enjoyed by the Nambudiri caste. The Pattar Unnis also known as Nattu Pattars are a Tamil Brahmin community that migrated to Kerala, considered equivalent to Nair or Ambalavasi in caste hierarchy of South-Central region of Kerala.

== People with the surname "Unni" ==
Notable people with name/surname Unni include:

- Unni Mary, Indian film actress and producer
- Unni Menon, Indian film playback singer
- Unni Mukundan (born 1987), Indian film actor
- Unni R. (born Jayachandran Parameswaran in 1971), Indian writer
- Divya Unni (born 1981), Indian actress of Malayalam and Tamil films
- E. P. Unny, Indian political cartoonist.
- K. S. Neelakantan Unni (1895–1980), Sanskrit scholar, compiled many legends about temples, famous persons, etc. and translated Kalidasa's Shakuntalam to Malayalam
- Kottarathil Sankunni, Malayalam writer
- M. K. Unni Nayar (1911–1950), Indian journalist
- Monisha Unni (1971–1992), Indian film actress
- P. Unni, Indian politician
- P. Unnikrishnan (born 1966), Carnatic vocalist and playback singer
- R. S. Unni (1925–1999), Indian politician
- Urmila Unni, Indian dancer and actress
- Utthara Unni, Indian film actress
- Varun Unni, Indian film composer and singer
- Vidhya Unni, Indian film actress
- Sandeep Unnikrishnan, Indian Army Officer
- B. Unnikrishnan, Indian (Kerala) Movie director

== See also ==
- Brahmin
- Nair
- Ambalavasi
