= Angamaly Assembly constituency =

Constituency of the Kerala legislative assembly in India

Coordinates: 10.20°N 76.38°E

Angamaly
- Constituency No. 75 for the Kerala Legislative Assembly
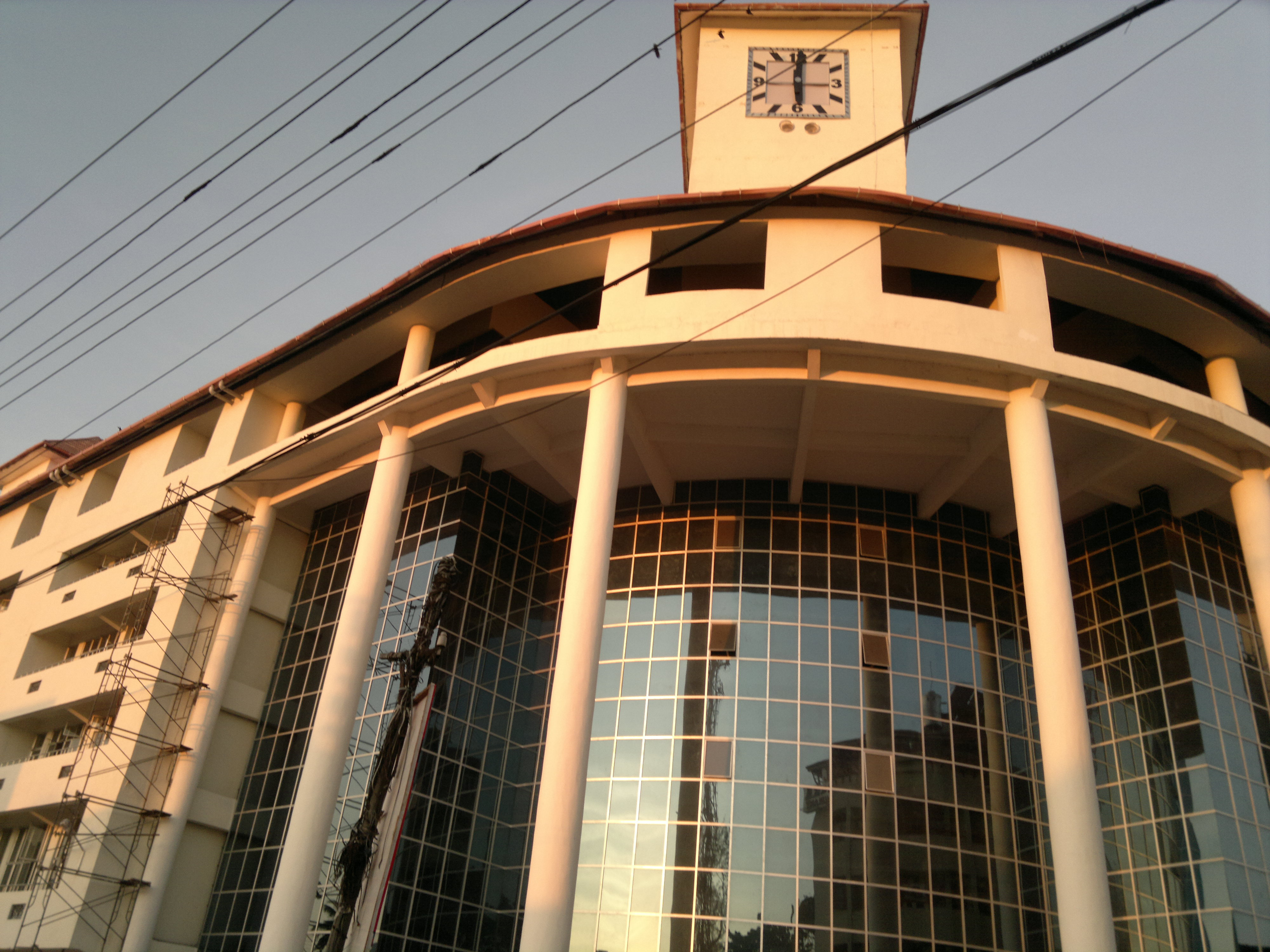
- KSRTC Bus Station at Angamaly

Constituency details
- Country: India
- Region: South India
- State: Kerala
- District: Ernakulam
- Established: 1965
- Total electors: 1,63,696 (2016)
- Reservation: None

Member of Legislative Assembly
- 16th Kerala Legislative Assembly
- Incumbent Roji M. John
- Party: INC
- Alliance: UDF
- Elected year: 2026

Angamaly legislative assembly constituency is one of the 140 state legislative assembly constituencies in Kerala in southern India. It is also one of the seven state legislative assembly constituencies included in Chalakudy Lok Sabha constituency. As of the 2026 assembly elections, the current MLA is Roji M. John of INC.

This constituency is home to Archeparchy of Ernakulam–Angamaly and is dominated by Syrian Catholics, and therefore is a Congress stronghold.

== Local self-governed segments ==
Angamaly Assembly constituency is composed of the following local self-governed segments:

Name	Status (Grama panchayat/Municipality)	Taluk
Angamaly	Municipality	Aluva
Ayyampuzha	Grama panchayat	Aluva
Kalady	Grama panchayat	Aluva
Karukutty	Grama panchayat	Aluva
Malayattoor-Neeleeswaram	Grama panchayat	Aluva
Manjapra	Grama panchayat	Aluva
Mookkannoor	Grama panchayat	Aluva
Parakkadavu	Grama panchayat	Aluva
Thuravoor	Grama panchayat	Aluva

== Members of Legislative Assembly ==
The following list contains all members of Kerala Legislative Assembly who have represented the constituency:

Key

INC KEC CPI(M) JD(S)

Election	Niyama Sabha	Member	Party	Tenure
1967	3rd	A. P. Kurian	CPI(M)	1967 – 1970
1970	4th	A. P. Kurian	CPI(M)	1970 – 1977
1977	5th	A. P. Kurian	CPI(M)	1977 – 1980
1980	6th	A. P. Kurian	CPI(M)	1980 – 1982
1982	7th	M. V. Mani	KEC	1982 – 1987
1987	8th	M. V. Mani	KEC	1987 – 1991
1991	9th	P. J. Joy	INC	1991 – 1996
1996	10th	P. J. Joy	INC	1996 – 2001
2001	11th	P. J. Joy	INC	2001 – 2006
2006	12th	Jose Thettayil	JD(S)	2006 – 2011
2011	13th	Jose Thettayil	JD(S)	2011 – 2016
2016	14th	Roji M John	INC	2016 - 2021
2021	15th	Roji M John	INC	2021 - 2026
2026	16th	Roji M John	INC	Incumbent

== Election results ==
Percentage change (±%) denotes the change in the number of votes from the immediate previous election.

=== 2026 ===
2026 Kerala Legislative Assembly election: Angamaly
Party	Candidate	Votes	%	±%
INC	Roji M. John	78,331	59.86	
CPI(M)	Saju Paul	41,323	31.58	
TTP	Promy Kuriakose	9,893	7.56	
NOTA	NOTA	666	0.51	
SUCI(C)	P V Rajeesh	220	0.17	
Independent	Joby Paul Uppan	163	0.12	
Independent	Suphil Sebastian	156	0.12	
Independent	Subran	96	0.07	
Margin of victory		37,008	28.28	
Turnout		130848		
INC hold		Swing		

=== 2021 ===
There were 1,77,927 registered voters in the constituency for the 2021 Kerala Assembly election.

2021 Kerala Legislative Assembly election: Angamaly
Party	Candidate	Votes	%	±%
INC	Roji M. John	71,562	51.86	▲2.90
JD(S)	Jose Thettayil	55,633	40.31	▼1.91
BJP	Adv. K.V. Sabu	8677	6.29	▼0.33
NOTA	None of the Above	669	0.48	▼0.12
Independent	Martin Paul	623	0.45	–
BSP	Stalin Nikathithara	326	0.24	▼0.30
SUCI(C)	Jothilakshmi	301	0.22	▼0.22
Independent	Velayudhan	206	0.15	–
Margin of victory		15,929	11.55	▲4.81
Turnout		137,997	77.55	▼5.63
INC hold		Swing	▲2.90	

=== 2016 ===
There were 1,63,696 registered voters in the constituency for the 2016 Kerala Assembly election.

2016 Kerala Legislative Assembly election: Angamaly
Party	Candidate	Votes	%	±%
INC	Roji M. John	66,666	48.96	–
JD(S)	Benny Moonjely	57,480	42.22	▼7.34
KEC	P. J. Babu	9,014	6.62	–
NOTA	None of the above	811	0.60	–
BSP	Jayanthi Avinash	742	0.54	▼0.08
SUCI(C)	M. M. Kanjanavally	595	0.44	▼0.03
Independent	P. R. Manickyamangalam	385	0.28	–
Independent	Sunny Thomas Madassery	245	0.18	–
SP	Shajan Thattil	219	0.16	–
Margin of victory		9,186	6.74	▲0.94
Turnout		1,36,157	83.18	▲1.74
INC gain from JD(S)		Swing		

=== 2011 ===
There were 1,52,370 registered voters in the constituency for the 2011 election.

2011 Kerala Legislative Assembly election: Angamaly
Party	Candidate	Votes	%	±%
JD(S)	Jose Thettayil	61,500	49.56	
KC(J)	Johnny Nellore	54,330	43.78	
BJP	M. A. Brahmaraj	4,17	3.32	
Independent	Johnson I. T.	1,374	1.11	−
BSP	M. G. Purushottaman	774	0.62	−
KJ	Poulose Kidangen	518	0.42	−
SUCI(C)	K. C. Jayan	514	0.41	−
Samajwadi Jan Parishad	Francis Njaliyan	482	0.39	
Independent	Johnson	248	0.20	
Independent	John Chacko	229	0.18	
Margin of victory		7,170	5.78	
Turnout		1,24,086	81.44	
JD(S) hold		Swing		

== See also ==
- Angamaly
- Ernakulam district
- List of constituencies of the Kerala Legislative Assembly
- 2016 Kerala Legislative Assembly election
