= Pushpaka Brahmin =

Group of castes in Kerala, India

Pushpaka is a generic term that refers to a group of certain Hindu Ambalavasi castes in Kerala.

The term Pushpaka applies primarily to a caste known itself as Pushpaka (or Pushpakan Unni) in South Kerala (Travancore). Pushpakas were assigned the job of tending flowers and making garlands in the Hindu temples. They were also given rights to teach sacred texts including Sanskrit language in the Pathasalas associated with Hindu temples in Central and North Kerala. They are often referred to as Pushpakas owing to their cultural similarity with Pushpakas in South Kerala. In addition to these two castes, the term Pushpaka, in a wider sense, applies to certain other Ambalavasi castes like Theeyatt Unnis, Kurukkals, Puppallis, Plappallis, Nambidis, Nambeesans and Daivampadis. All these castes are associated with temple related jobs who render services to the temple and have many socio-cultural similarities.

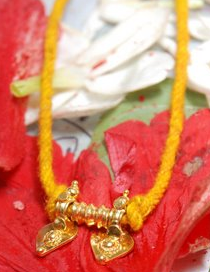
Pushpaka Thali - Wedding pendant of Pushpaka women

== Community welfare ==
Nowadays, Pushpaka Brahmins are reluctant to cling to their traditional line of profession like priesthood, adhyapanam (teaching) in Pathasalas, malakettu (garland making), vilakkeduppu (lamp bearing), thidambettu (bearing replica of deity on religious procession) etc, due to low income from these professions.

Sree Pushpakabrahmana Seva Sangham is an organisation working for the welfare of Pushpaka Brahmin castes.
