= Sree Pushpakabrahmana Seva Sangham =

- ശ്രീ പുഷ്പകബ്രാഹ്മണ സേവാ സംഘം
- SPSS Logo

- ॥ सत्यं परं धीमहि ॥ ॥ സത്യം പരം ധീമഹി ॥
- Abbreviation: SPSS
- Nickname: Pushpakasangham
- Established: 28 July 1968
- Founder: Aranmula N.V. Neelakantan Unni
- Founded at: Thiruvananthapuram
- Type: Caste based organisation
- Headquarters: Thiruvananthapuram
- Location: Kerala, India
- Official languages: Malayalam, Sanskrit, English
- General Secretary: T.R. Hari Narayanan
- Affiliations: All Kerala Brahmin Federation (AKBF), All India Brahmin Federation (AIBF)

Sree Pushpakabrahmana Seva Sangham (SPSS) is a registered charitable organisation which works for the progress of Pushpaka Brahmins, a group of culturally identical Brahmin castes like Pushpaka Unnis, Theeyatt Unnis, Kurukkals, Nambeesans etc. in Kerala.

== Affiliation ==
Sree Pushpakabrahmana Seva Sangham is affiliated to the All Kerala Brahmin Federation (AKBF), a branch of All India Brahmin Federation (AIBF).

== Organisation structure and membership ==
Sree Pushpakabrahmana Seva Sangham is organised in three tiers - Kendra Prathinidhi Sabha (Central Council), Jilla Prathinidhi Sabha (District Council) and Pradesika Sabha (Regional Council).

== Zones ==
The districts are grouped under three zones for more co-ordination of activities. They are Dakshinamekhala (South Zone), Madhyamekhala (Central Zone) and Uttaramekhala (North Zone).

Zone	Districts
South	Thiruvananthapuram, Kollam, Pathanamthitta, Alappuzha, Kottayam
Central	Idukki, Ernakulam, Thrissur, Palakkad,
North	Malappuram, Kozhikode, Wyanad, Kannur, Kasaragod

== Publications ==
SPSS publishes a monthly magazine called "Pushpakadhwani", meaning "Voice of Pushpakas". SPSS also publishes books on art and cultural topics such as Koodiyattam, Brahmanipatt, Theeyaatt, Shodasa Samskaras etc. Calendars and Diaries are also published annually.

== Political influence ==
Flag of SPSS as modified in its Golden Jubilee

Sree Pushpaka Brahmana Seva Sangham works as a pressure group and works towards greater political representation of Pushpaka Brahmins in governance. SPSS was able to bring forward various issues related to reservation in various political and social systems. However, it is not an influential community organisation in Kerala politics.
