= Palliyarathalam Bhadrakali Kshethram =

Palliyarathalam Bhadrakali Temple
- Palliyarathalam Bhadrakali Temple, Nedumpuram, Pathanamthitta, Kerala

Religion
- Affiliation: Hinduism
- District: Pathanamthitta
- Deity: Bhadrakali
- Festival: Pongala

Location
- Location: Nedumpuram, Thiruvalla
- State: Kerala
- Country: India
- Interactive map of Palliyarathalam Bhadrakali Temple
- Coordinates: 9°21′51.8″N 76°32′23.1″E

Architecture
- Type: Architecture of Kerala

Specifications
- Temple: One
- Elevation: 28.96 m (95 ft)

Palliyarathalam Bhadrakali Kshethram is an ancient temple located at Nedumpuram East (near Podiyadi, Thiruvalla) in Pathanamthitta in the Indian state of Kerala. The deities of the temple are Devi (Bhadrakali) and Shiva. The temple belongs to Travancore Devaswom Board.

Poojas are conducted occasionally to the Brahma Rakshassu.

== Location ==
This temple is located with the geographic coordinates of 9°21′51.8″N 76°32′23.1″E at an altitude of about 28.96 m above the mean sea level.

== Design ==
The temple is characterized by the distinctive sanctum sanctorum (shrikovil) where the three deities are seen in the same sanctum sanctorum.

Temple has historical importance related to the ancient Travancore King His Majesty Sri Padmanabha Dasa Vanchi Pala Anizham Thirunal Maharajah Marthanda Varma,(1706–1758). Veera Marthanda Varma took asylum in the temple when he needed protection from the 'Ettuveettil Pillamar' (Lords of the Eight Houses, a group of nobles from Eight Nair Houses in erstwhile Venad in Kerala). Veera Marthanda Varma Road runs in front of the shrine.

The Nedumprom Nampoothiri family is related to this temple history and the King. The King and his loyal chief minister (Devan) Ramayyan Dalava took asylum in the Madom (Brahmin house). It is said that some members of this Nampoothiri family sacrificed their lives in order to protect the King and became Brahmarakshassu. In recognition of this sacrifice, the King gave lands in Alapra, Ezhumattoor, Mannur and a Devi temple in the forest region of Pothenpuzha (Alapra) and making all these possessions free from taxes.

== Theeyattu ==
Theeyattu is an ancient and ritualistic art form done for the blessings of Devi Bhadrakali. It is conducted in the temple as offerings (vazhipadu) by the devotees of Devi. Theeyattu is performed by the members of a Brahmin community called 'Theeyattunni'. One of the ancient Theeyattunni families lives in front of the temple. They are responsible for conducting the above-mentioned Theeyattu there.
