= Unnithan =

Indian surname and title

Unnithan is an aristocratic title and surname of the Nair caste of Kerala, India. They constituted the Jenmi (feudal landlords) in the Kayamkulam region in the Kingdom of Travancore.

== History ==
The Unnithan and Vallyathan surnames originated from the title "Thānkal" (Malayalam: "താങ്കൾ"), which is a respectful designation used to address members of aristocratic families in Kerala, Unnithan means 'youngest Thānkal' and Valiathan means 'eldest Thānkal'.

According to legend, Maharajah Marthanda Varma of Travancore sought the help of certain Nair families to overcome the powerful Nair clan of Ettuveetil Pillamar, the Lords of the Eight Houses. Many members of these families were killed by the Ettuveetil Pillamar. Later, these unnithan families were awarded the title Valiathan.

== Position in society ==
Unnithan surname is prevalent only in the Kayamkulam region of Travancore, later due to conflicts between the Kayamkulam Raja and the Unnithan families, they were settled in Kollam and Pathanamthitta region of central Travancore. Many of these Unnithan families are recognised as Stani families.

Until the 19th century, Unnithan families were only allowed to marry from the higher class Nairs like Royal families, Valiyathan, Pillai, Kurup, Thampi, Karthav and Kaimal families. Currently, many families have started using the Surname "Nair". Unnithan ladies used the honorific title of "Kunjamma/Ittiyamma", indicative of their greater status among the Nair community, where ladies unanimously used the title of "Amma" and were married by the Rajahs or princes of the royal families such as Mavelikara, Ennakad, Prayikkara etc.

They were not allowed to marry from ordinary Nair families, who served as soldiers and performed kitchen duties in Unnithan households.

== Notable people ==
- P. G. N. Unnithan (1898–1965), last Diwan of the Kingdom of Travancore (1947–1948)
- Adoor Gopalakrishnan Unnithan (born 1941), Indian film director
- Ramachandran Unnithan (born 1951), Indian Kathakali exponent
- Rajmohan Unnithan (born 1953), Member of Parliament from Kasaragod Lok Sabha constituency (2019–present)
- K. B. Unnithan (1936–2017), Indian politician
- R. C. Unnithan (1936–2015), Malayalam political activist
- Suresh Unnithan (born 1956), Indian film and television director
