= Karnavar =

South Indian title and surname

Karanavar or Karanavan or Karanava, parsimoniously speaking, was used as a title or to denote the male head in Malayali, Tulu and Coorg society.

Karnavar is also a title for some aristocratic Nair families in and around Budhanur, Chenganoor, Kerala. These families are all branches of the same original family from Budhanur.

One legend is that it was conferred by Marthanda Varma the King of Travancore, while consolidating his newly found Kingdom of Thiruvithamkur (Travancore), the nephew Rama Varma (later Dharma Raja) and the sister of Marthanda Varma were passing through the said area under the protection of Vattaparambil Valiathan when they were attacked by the powerful Nair Lords, Ettuveetil Pillamar of Venad. Marthanda Varma's brother-in-law and other fighters lost their lives, but the sister, the Rani of Attingal, and her son escaped and ran through the fields ("Budhanoor padam"), where they encountered an aristocratic Nair family man who was managing farming in the field. They addressed the man as "Karnavar" and asked for his help. He helped them by hiding in his tharavad from the Ettuveettil Nairs, protecting him, and informing the nearby King's ally known as Aaruveetil Madampimar who in turn informed the Vakkavanjipuzha Madhom, whose head, known as the Vanjipuzha Thampuran, was an ally of Marthanda Varma. Later Marthanda Varma endowed him with riches and the hereditary surname of "Karnavar" when he became the Maharajah.

== Kerala ==
The senior most maternal uncle was the head of the matrilineal joint families or Tharavadu was called Karnavar. The authority of the Karnavar in a family is unquestionable. Even after the decline of Matrilineal system, the word is used to denote authority, and elderly person. This titile is given by the Maharaja of Travancore to an aristocratic Nair family because they have saved the Rani of Attingal.

The honorific plural 'Karanavar' is used for the community point man or head of Bhagavathi temples. In the old days, the 'Koil Thampuran (a Namboothiri ruler) would nominate him.

== Kodagu and Tulu ==
The founder of a Kodava Okka (clannish family) was known as "karona". During ancestral spirit worship, a Malayali would act as a shaman and would get possessed by Karona spirit of a particular Okka.
