= Punchavayal =

- village
- Location in Kerala, India Punchavayal (India)
- Coordinates: 9°29′5″N 76°52′27″E
- Country: India
- State: Kerala
- District: Kottayam

Government
  - Type: Panchayath
  - Body: Mundakkayam panchayath

Languages
  - Official: Malayalam, English
- Time zone: UTC+5:30 (IST)
- PIN: 686513
- Area code: 04828
- Vehicle registration: KL-34

Punchavayal is a village in Mundakayam panchayath of Kanjirappally taluk in the Indian state of Kerala. It is approximately 6 km away by road from Mundakayam, and is at the border of Kottayam and Idukki districts.

== Economy ==
Punchavayal is a land of coffee, pepper, cocoa and natural rubber.

== Administration ==
Punchavayal is a part of Poonjar Constituency for Kerala Legislative Assembly Elections and part of Pathanamthitta (Lok Sabha constituency) for Indian General Elections. P. C. George of Kerala Janapaksham is the sitting MLA. Anto Antony of INC is the MP representing Punchavayal, Mundakayam.

== Sabarigiri International Airport ==
On 19 of July 2017, the Kerala Government announced the construction of the 5th International Airport in Kerala, Sabarigiri International Airport at Cheruvally Estate of Harrisons Plantations at Erumely, situated at the Border of Kottayam District and Pathanamthitta district to facilitate the travel of Sabarimala pilgrims. The proposed project site Cheruvally Estate is just 13 km from Punchavayal.

== Education ==
- Sree Sabareesa College, Murikkumvayal
- St. Mary's LP School, Punchavayal
- Govt.Vocational HSS, Murikkumvayal
