= Gurukkal =

Gurukkal may refer to:

- Kurukkal, or Gurukkal, an Ambalavasi caste of Tamil origin
- Gurukkal, a guru or teacher of kalaripayattu
