= Rajan Gurukkal =

Indian historian

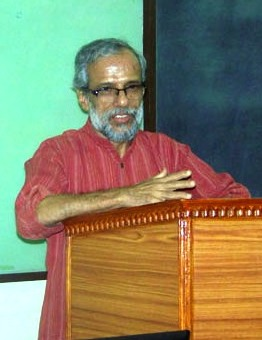
- Prof. Rajan Gurukkal speaking at an event in 2007
- Born: 15 May 1948 (age 78), Kariyad, Kannur
- Education: University of Calicut; Jawaharlal Nehru University
- Occupations: Vice-Chairman Kerala State Higher Education council Historian; Vice chancellor Professor; Writer

Rajan Gurukkal (born 16 May 1948) is a leading Indian social scientist, historian, professor and writer. He has written many books and articles on different topics. He has also received awards for his works.

Gurukkal is generally considered a left-of-centre historian by political analysts.

== Biography ==
Rajan Gurukkal was born on 15 May 1948 in a northern Kerala village called Kariyad in the Kannur District of India. He began his education in his family school at Kuruvattur in the Kozhikode District, and subsequently in Kariyad Nambiar's Upper Primary School and Ramavilasam Secondary School. He then joined Government College, Madappally, and Government Brennen College, Thalassery, for his graduation. He received a postgraduate degree in history from the University of Calicut in 1972, with first class and first rank from the University, after which he took up teaching at the Union Christian College at Aluva in Kerala. He later completed his MPhil in 1978 and his PhD in 1985 in historical socio-economics from Jawaharlal Nehru University, New Delhi. Then became a faculty of Centre for Historical Studies, JNU.

He was a visiting faculty briefly at Humboldt University (1987) and at Ecole des Hautes Etudes en Sciences Sociales, Paris (2006) and lectured at several Universities in the country as well as abroad such as Humboldt, Leipzig, Berlin, Heidelberg, Tübingen and Ruhr (Germany). EHESS, Paris; and CIRAD, Montpellier (France); Toronto and Kingston (Canada); Manchester, Glasgow, Reading, Westminster and SOAS (UK); Shanghai (China); Tokyo, Taisho and Toyo Bunko (Japan); Central European University, Budapest (Hungary). He has worked on different and several important posts such as the dean of faculty, member of the academic council, senate and syndicate of a few universities and social science research institutes and others. Former Vice-Chancellor of Mahatma Gandhi University, Kottayam, India. He was Sundararajan Visiting Professor at the Centre for Contemporary Studies, Indian Institute of Science, Bangalore during 2012-2016. He currently serves as the Vice-Chairman of the Kerala State Higher Education Council.

== Career ==
Gurukkal began his career as a junior lecturer at Union Christian College in 1972 as soon as he finished his postgraduation. After completing his doctoral education, he joined as the teaching faculty at the Centre for Historical Studies of Jawaharlal Nehru University for some time before taking up the chair of Professor and Director, School of Social Sciences, Mahatma Gandhi University, Kottayam, Kerala in 1988. He took up the position at Mahatma Gandhi University upon the invitation of noted Kannada writer and the then University Vice-Chancellor U. R. Ananthamurthy.

=== Literary career ===
He has written five books in Malayalam and six books in English, on the topic of Socio-economic, cultural history of Kerala, structural anthropology, historical sociology, and human ecology of the Southern Western Ghats. He has about 150 research articles in the national and international Journals besides many articles in various magazines and newspapers on current issues.

== Awards ==
- Teacher Fellowship. Indian Council of Historical Research (1977)
- National Teacher Fellowship. University Grants Commission (1980)
- Oravakkal Mathen Memorial Best Academician Award (1986)
- Braj Dev Prasad Memorial Prize for the best book on ancient Indian history, Rethinking Classical Indo-Roman Trade, OUP (2016)

== Select bibliography ==
- Aryanisation of South India Dravidian Encyclopaedia, Trivandrum, 1983
- From the Royalty of Icons to the Divinity of Royalty: Aspects of Vaisnava Icons and Kingship in South India in R. Parimoo ed. Vaisnavism and Indian Art, Baroda, 1984.
- State and Society in South India 200 B.C to 300 A.D, History of India: Earliest Times to 800 A.D Indira Gandhi Open University. New Delhi. 1990.
- Early Social Formation of South India and Its Transitional Processes, in H.V. Sreenivasa Murthy, B. Surendra Rao, Kesavan Veluthat and S.A.Bari eds.
- Formation of Caste Society in Kerala : Historical Antecedents in K.L.Sharma ed. Caste and Class in Indian States, Delhi, 1994
- Towards a New Discourse: Discursive Processes in Early South India, in R. Champakalakshmi and S. Gopal (Eds.)
- Ideology, Essays in Honour of Romila Thapar, New Delhi, 1996.
- Recent Historiographic Dimensions on Early South Indian Socio-economics, in K.K.N.Kurup ed. New Dimensions in South Indian History
- Historical Materialism and History, in T.R. Venugopalan Ed. History and Theory, Government College Publications, Thrissur
- Social Formation in Iron Age South India, K. Surendra Rao and Kesavan Veluthat (Eds) Sheik Ali Felicitation Volume, Mangalore 2000.
- (and about 150 research articles in various national and international journals).

Monographs & Books

- Levi-Strauss (Monograph in Malayalam), Viswadarsana publications, Trissur, 1986.
- History of Kerala, (book in Malayalam, jointly done with Raghava Varier) Vallathol Vidyapitham, Edappal, 1991.
- The Kerala Temple and the Early Medieval Agrarian System, Vallathol Vidyapitham, Edappal, 1992.
- Myth and Society (book in Malayalam, jointly done with Raghava Varier, Jalakam Publishers, Perambra, Kozhikode. 1994
- Cultural History of Kerala, vol. I. Department of Cultural Publications, Thiruvananthapuram, 1999.
- Kerala Charithram 2 Vols (Book in Malayalam), jointly done with Raghava Varier) Vallathol Vidyapitham, 2012
- Forest Landscapes of the Southern Western Ghats, India jointly edited with B. Ramesh, French Institute, Pondicherry, 2007
- Social Formations of Early South India, OUP, 2009.
- Myth Charithram Samuham (book in Malayalam), SPCS, 2013
- Suice Trends in Kerala: Causes and Allevaiations, Monograph, Stat Planning Board, 2010
- Rethinking Classical Indo-Roman Trade: Political Economy of Eastern Mediterranean Exchange Relations, OUP 2016
- History and Theory of Knowledge Production: An Introductory Outline, OUP 2018
- History of Kerala: Pre-historic to the Present, jointly done with Raghava Varier, Orient Blackswan, 2018

== Projects ==
- Making of Modern Kerala, UGC Major Research Project, 1999–2001.
- Ford Foundation Project on Historical Atlas of South India, in collaboration with the French Institute, Pondicherry (2006 April – 2008 April).
- Fringe Area Socioeconomic Study of the Periyar Tiger Reserve, World Bank Project (IEDP, 2002–03).
- Socio-economic Sustainability Study, Periyar Tiger Reserve, World Bank Project (IEDP, 2003).
- Sabarimala Enclave: Pilgrim Impact Assessment, Periyar Tiger Reserve, World Bank Project (IEDP, 2002–03).
- Process Documentation Research, Periyar Tiger Reserve, World Bank Project (IEDP, 2003–04)

== See also ==
- List of Indian writers
