= SPSS (disambiguation) =

SPSS is a statistical analysis software.

SPSS may also refer to:

- SPSS Inc., company
- Narco sub, self-propelled semi-submersible
- Science Planning and Scheduling System, module of the Hubble Space Telescope
- Special State Protection Service of Georgia, the state protection agency of Georgia

== Organizations ==
- Sree Pushpakabrahmana Seva Sangham, Kerala, India

== Schools ==
- St. Paul's Secondary School, Hong Kong
- St. Peter's Secondary School (disambiguation)
- South Peace Secondary School, Dawson Creek, British Columbia
