= Mookkannoor Govt. Higher Secondary School =

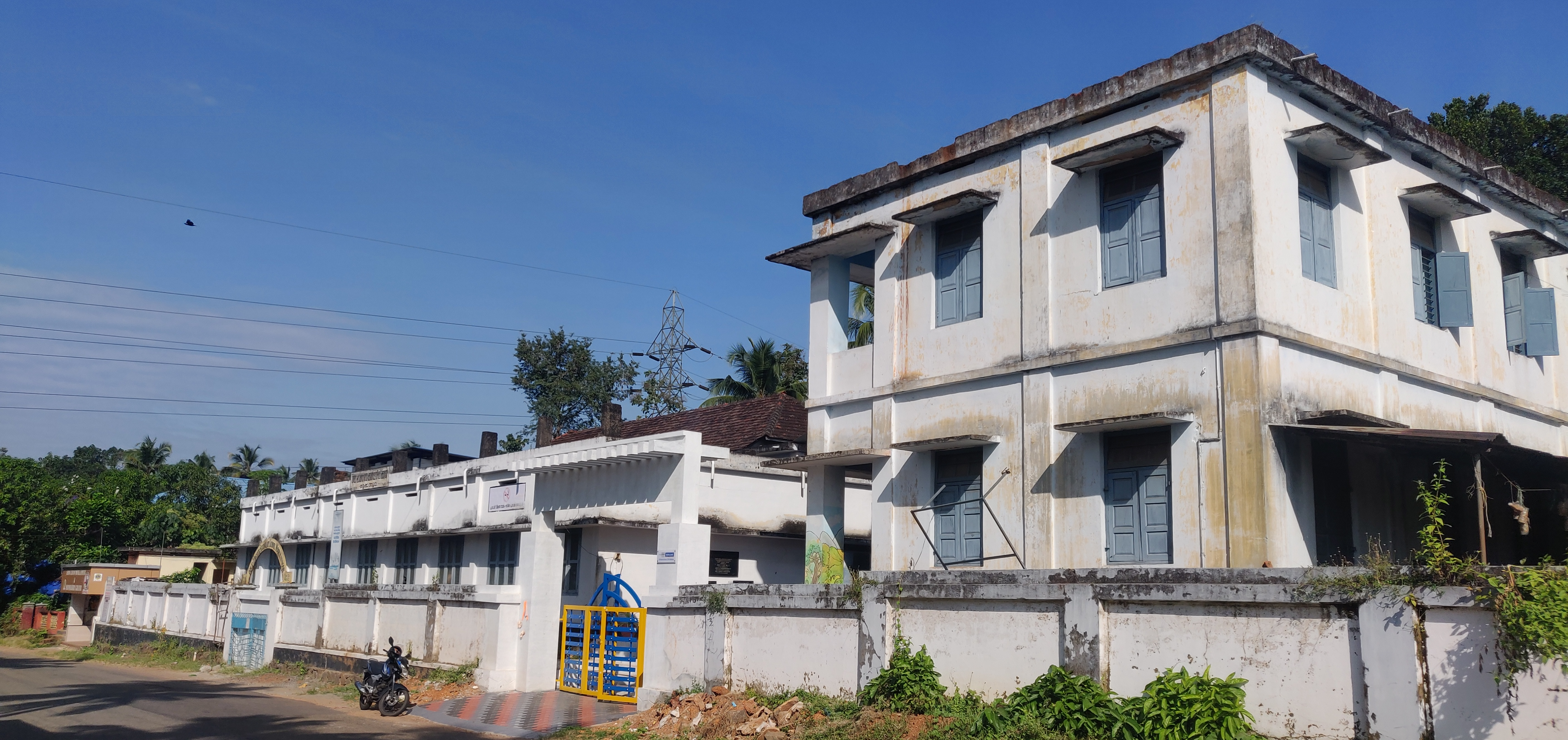
- Main campus of Mookkannoor Govt HSS

Location
- Mookkannoor; Mookkannoor, Kerala; India
- Coordinates: 10°12′49.65″N 76°24′18.21″E

Information
- Type: Higher Secondary
- Established: 1931
- School district: Ernakulam District
- Gender: Boys and Girls
- Affiliation: Govt. of Kerala
- Website: https://schoolwiki.in/25027

Mookkannoor Govt. Higher Secondary school is a school situated at Mookkannoor Gram Panchayath, Ernakulam District, Kerala, India. The school is situated in Angamaly assembly constituency. The school was established on 1931. The school is situated near St. Mary's Forane church in Angamaly-Ezattumugham Road.

== History ==
The school was started as in 1913. by St. Mary's Church.

== Amenities ==
All high school and higher secondary school has now upgraded to smart class rooms by KITES.

== Curriculum ==
The school follows Kerala State Syllabus of Education (SCERT) for classes from 1st to 12th. In 2012, the school scored 100% victory in SSLC Examination.

== Buildings ==
The school has two double storied buildings and a single storied building. The higher secondary campus and the playground is situated in nearby campus. There a doubly storied building and a single storied building for higher secondary school.

== Notable alumni ==
- K P Hormis

== Gallery ==
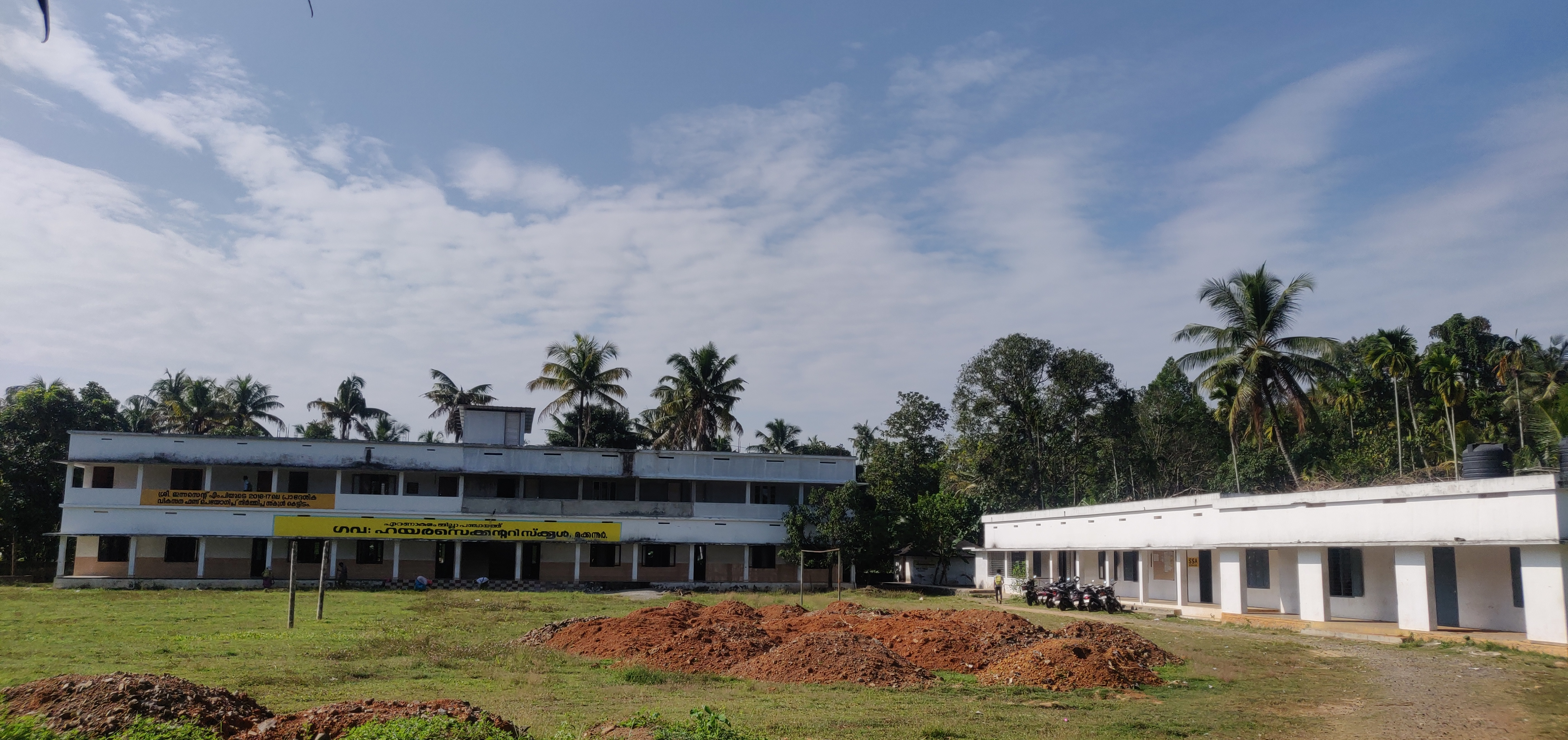
Higher Secondary Campus

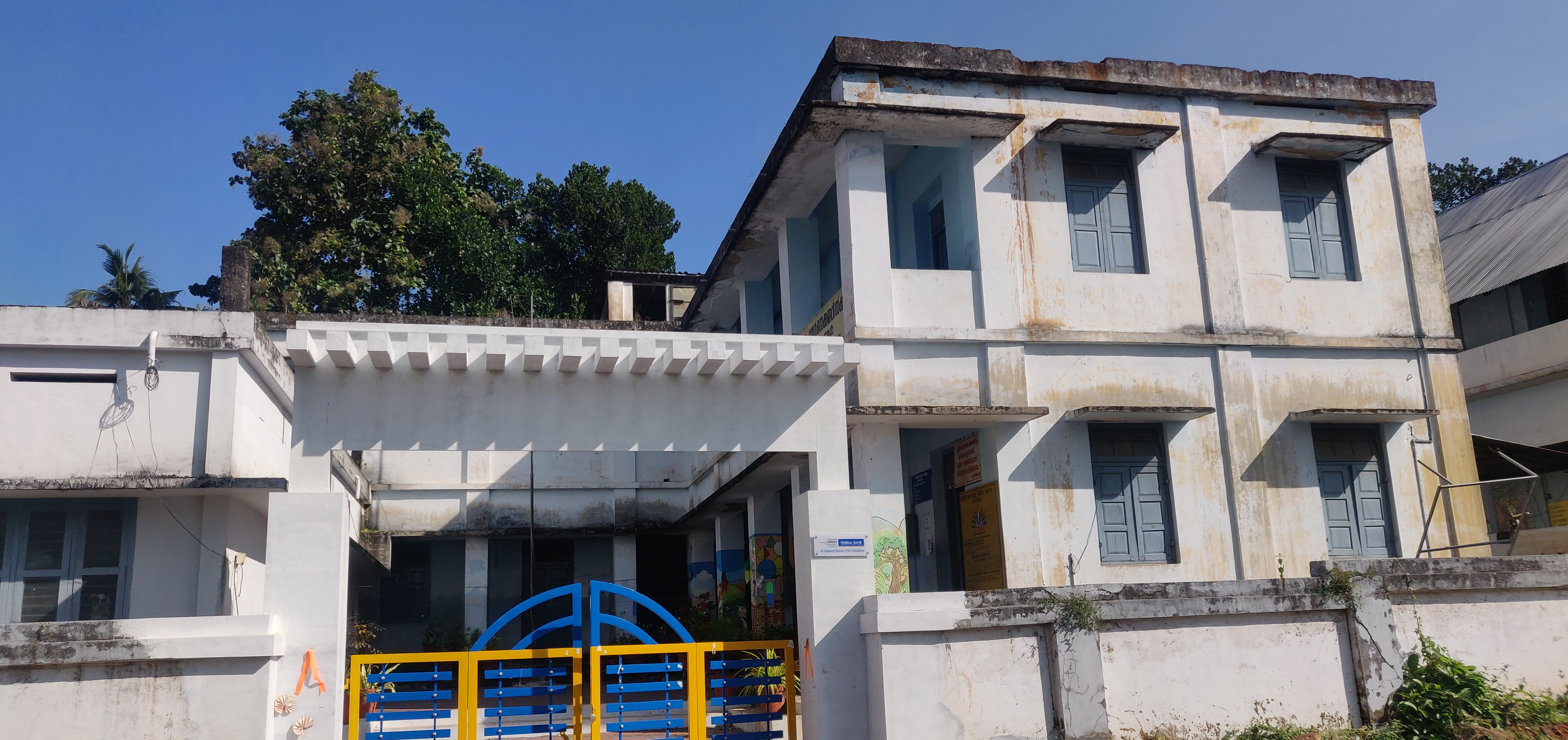
Main Gate

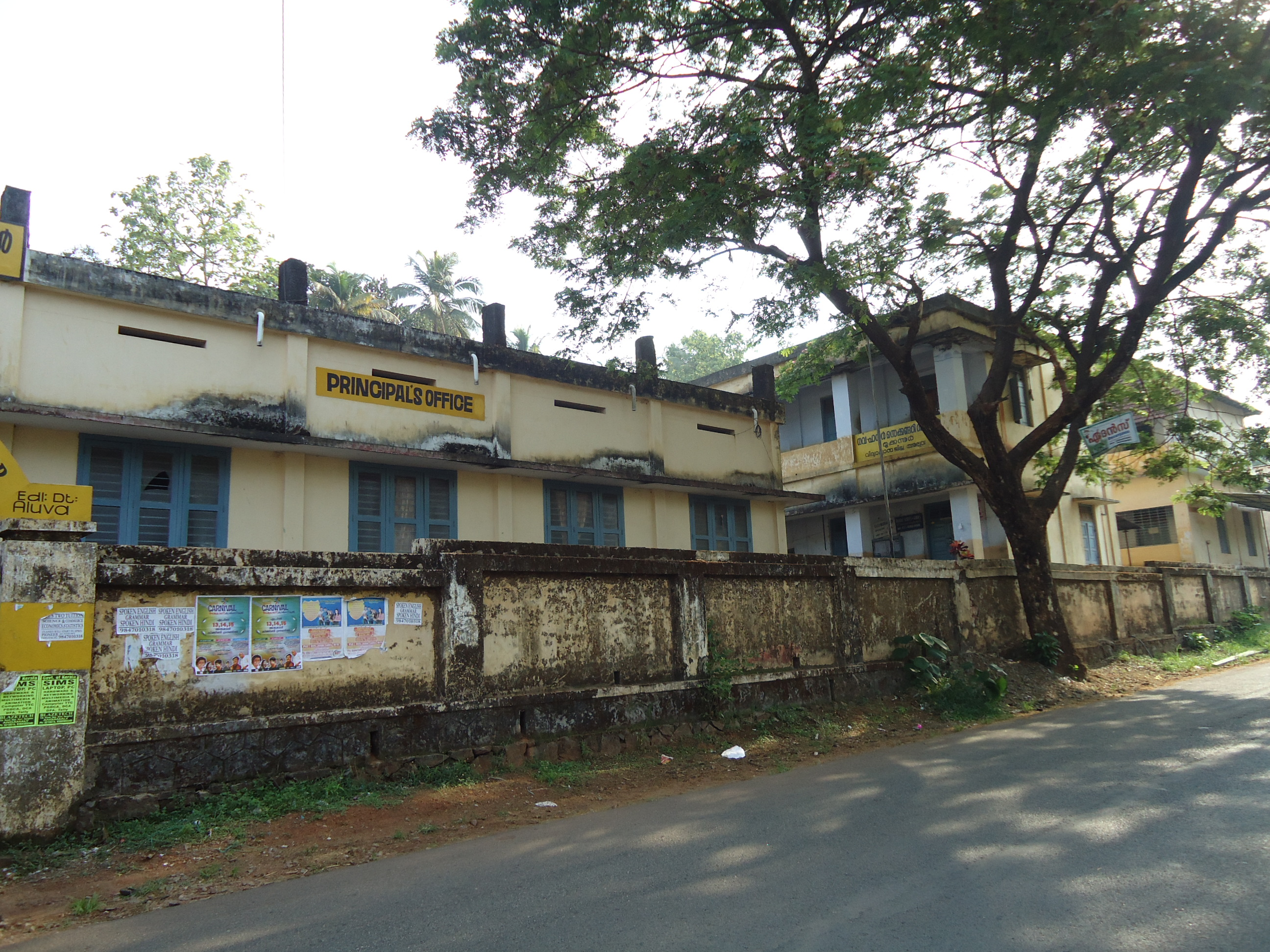
Side View

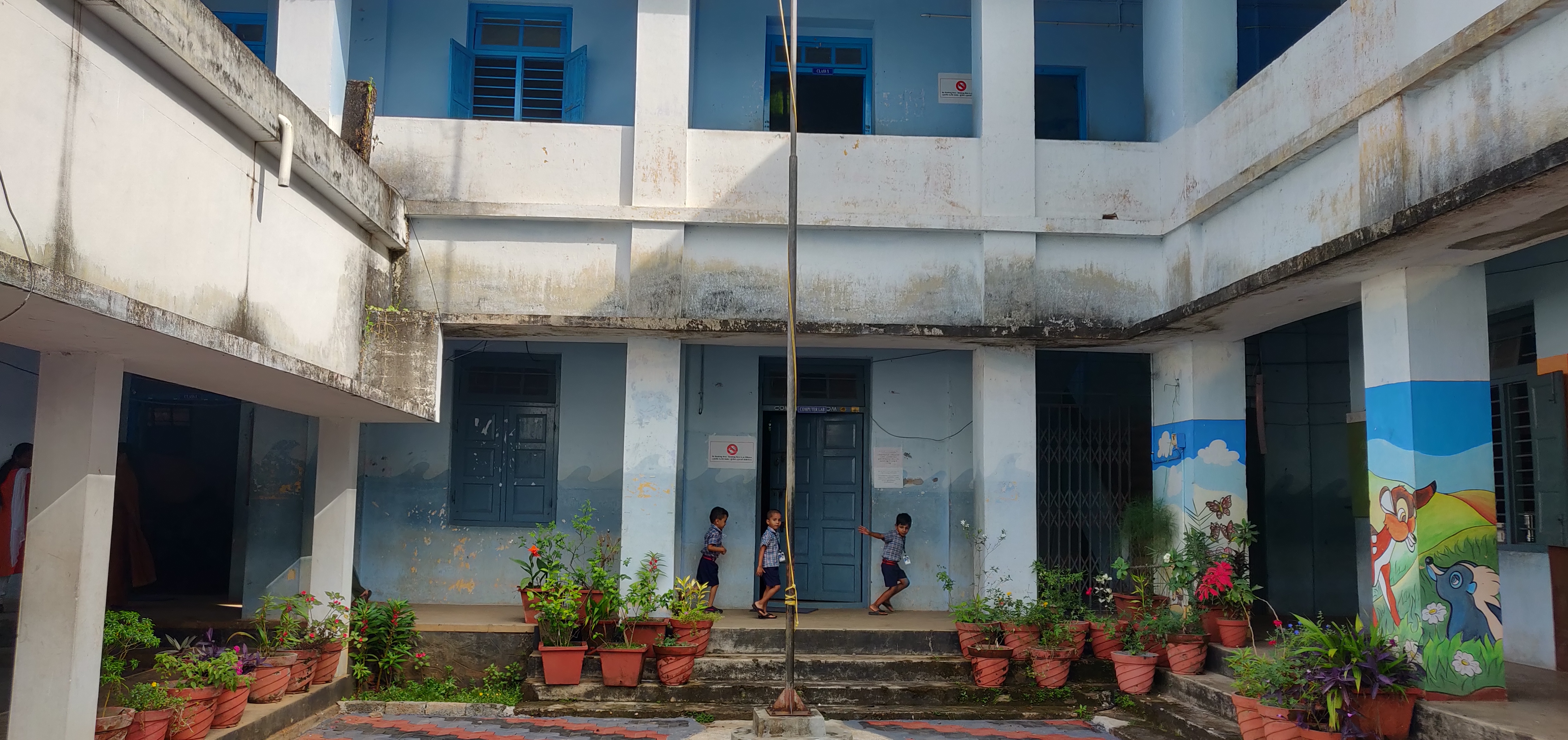
Main Block

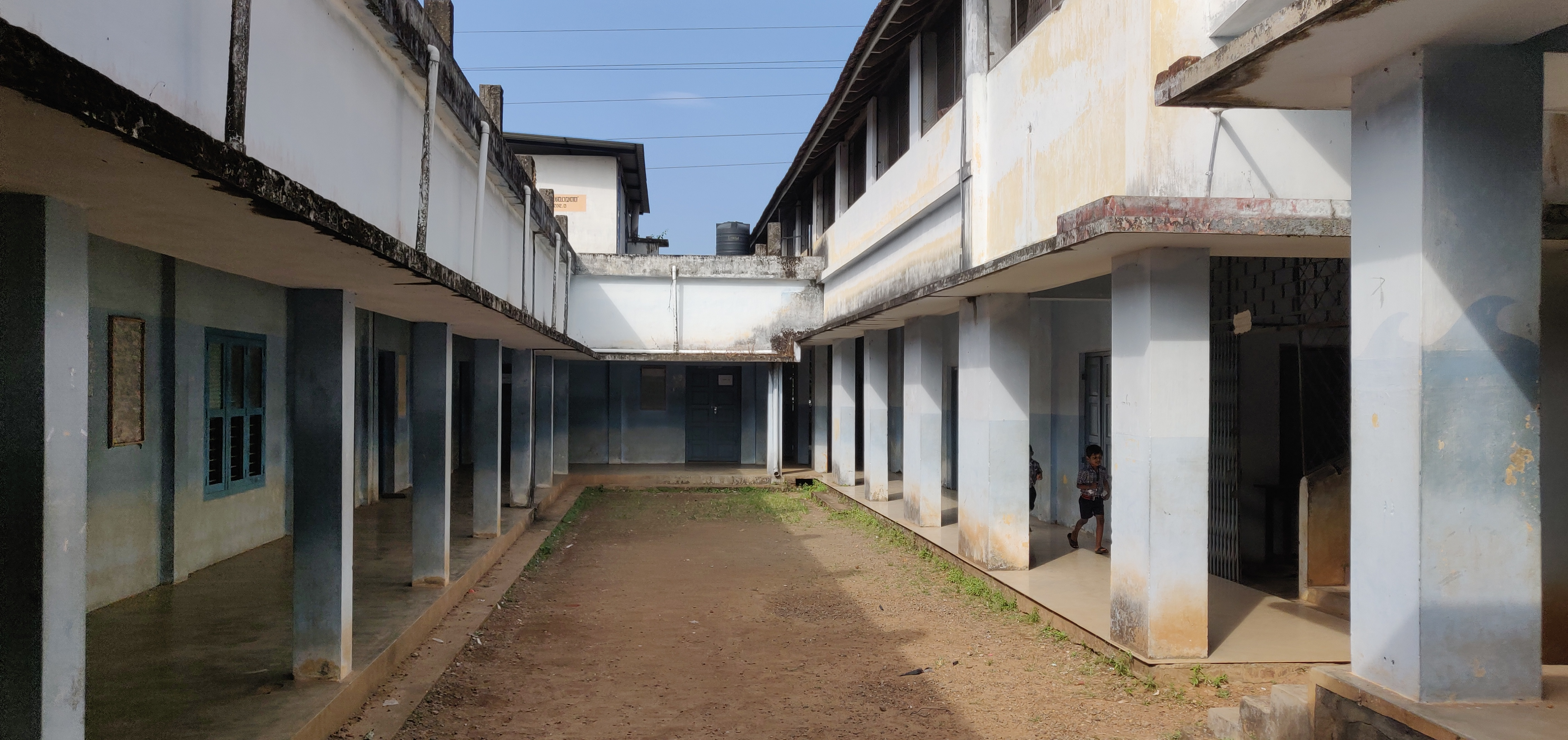
Second Block

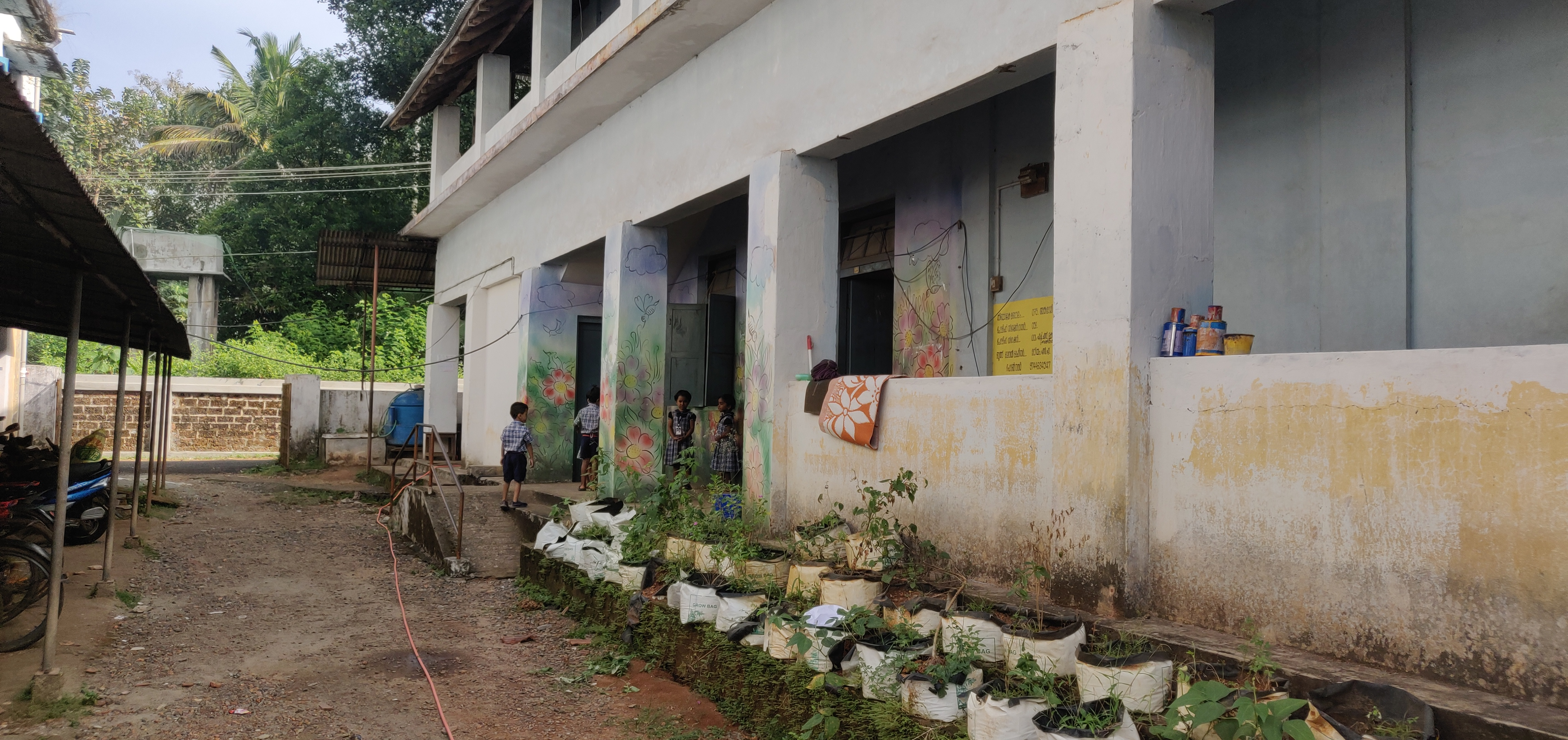
Third Block

== See also ==
- List of schools in Ernakulam district
- SSLC
- Education in Kerala
