= K. P. Hormis =

Indian Banker

- Born: 18 October 1917; Mookkannoor, Kingdom of Cochin, British India (present day Ernakulam, Kerala, India)
- Died: 26 January 1988 (aged 70)
- Occupations: Lawyer; Banker
- Known for: Founder of Federal Bank

Kulangara Paulo Hormis (18 October 1917 – 26 January 1988) was an Indian banker who is the founder of Federal Bank Limited.

== Early life and education ==
He was born on 18 October 1917 at Mookkannoor; a small village in the suburbs of Greater Cochin in a traditional agrarian family. He initially started his professional journey as a Lawyer in the Munisiff Court of Perumbavoor. He took over the management of Travancore Federal Bank on 30 December 1944 and until 18 May 1945 Travancore Federal Bank Limited functioned at Nedumpuram under his chairmanship.

The Federal Bank Limited is a major private sector commercial bank headquartered at Aluva, Kochi, Kerala.
