= Dravidian Linguistics Association =

The Dravidian Linguistics Association is a learned society of scholars of Dravidian languages, based in Thiruvananthapuram. It holds the annual Conference of Dravidian Linguists. The president is P. T. Murugaretnam (Madurai Kamaraj University).

== History ==
The association was established on March 15, 1972, by V. I. Subramonium (University of Kerala), R. C. Hiremath (Karnataka University) and Mahadeva Sastry (Sri Venkateswara University). To attract an international scholarship, the International School of Dravidian Linguistics was formed on February 25, 1977, with R. C. Hiremath as the first internal and Franklin C. Southworth as the first external director. A Council of Direction was also constituted. The first annual Conference of Dravidian Linguists was held in 1971.

The languages of the five southern states of India constitute the Dravidian Languages: Malayalam is the official language of Kerala; Tamil that of Tamil Nadu; Telugu that of Telangana and Andhra Pradesh; and Kannada that of Karnataka. The Dravidian Linguistics Association is promoting this co-existence and contributing to research into the history, growth and intersecting attributes of the Dravidian languages. In this respect, the thesis Malayalam Verbal Forms of V. R. Prabodhachandran Nayar, is among the earliest output of the Association, being completed in 1972, the year of the DLA's foundation. The University of Kerala linguistics department maintains a close association with the Dravidian Linguistics Association.

== Governing Council ==
In the 2017-2018 academic year, the members of the association’s Governing Council were Professor B. Ramakrishna Reddy (Chairman), Professor G. K. Panikkar (Director), Professor K. Vishwanatham (President), Professor V. Syamala (Vice-President and Correspondent), Professor Naduvattom Gopalakrishnan (Secretary) and Dr. S. Abdul Samad (Treasurer).

== Journal ==
The association publishes the International Journal of Dravidian Linguistics (ISSN 0378-2484), a biannual peer-reviewed academic journal. It was established in 1972.
