= Hari Nama Keerthanam =

Hari Nama Keerthanam is a medieval devotional and philosophical text in Malayalam. Its title translates into English as "The Song of the Holy Name Hari." It was composed by Thunchaththu Ramanujan Ezhuthachan in Kerala around the 16th century. The work is historically important as it solidified the acceptance of the 51 letter version of the Malayalam alphabet owing to the song's immense popularity. The work is of great length and usually presented in book form. There are 66 original verses, to which a number of later verses and commentaries have been added, such as a section called the "Hari Narayanaya Nama," and the philosophical thoughts of the composer Ezhuthachan. P.R. Ramachander, in an introduction to his translation, notes of Ezhuthachan that:

From the book, it is clear that thunjathezhuthachan was a Vaishnavite who was fondly in love with the Advaitha philosophy. He mentions that his Guru was one Neelakanta Somayaji in one of the verses.

== Text ==
Opening lines from P.R. Ramachander's translation with his brief explanations:

Transliterated text

Omkaramaya porul moonayi pirinju udane,
Angaramayathinnu thaan thane sakshiyithu,
Bodham varuthu vathinnu aalayi ninna,
Paramacharya roopa, Hari Narayanaya Nama.

Onnayi ninneyiha randennu kandalavi,
Yunadyi orindal batha mindavathalla mama,
Pande kanakku varuvan nin krupa valikal,
Undakayengaliha narayanaya nama.

Translation

My salutations to that Narayana,
Who is also the lord Hari,
For being the great teacher,
Who stood as a person, to make me know,
That truth which is revealed by the sound of Om,
Though split into three forms of trinity,
As soon as it was born,
Is only an illusion created by my ego.

My salutations to that Narayana,
With a request from humble self,
To make me see him as one reality,
For I was made sad extreme,
To see that the indivisible one, has been split into two.

Ezhuthachan continues to tell us that though the god is one, we are made to believe that we as persons(antharatma) we are different from the all pervading reality (Paramathma).

V. R. Prabodhachandran Nayar's reader-friendly annotations on this devotional poem by Ezhuthachan is included in the series called "Kaiththiri" (meaning 'hand held wick emitting just sufficient light' ) and published by Thunchan Smaraka Samithi, Trivandruam in 2009. He has also written the Preface to Prof. K Sankaran Nampoothir's annotated translation into English of Harinamakeerthanam published by the same organization in 2006.
