= Jose Thettayil =

Indian politician

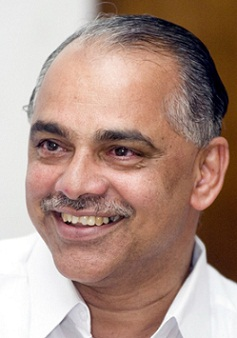

Minister for Transport
- In office 16 March 2009 – 23 May 2011
- Preceded by: Mathew T. Thomas
- Succeeded by: V. S. Sivakumar

Member of Legislative Assembly
- In office 11 May 2006 – 19 May 2016
- Preceded by: P. J. Joy
- Succeeded by: Roji M. John
- Constituency: Angamaly

Personal details
- Born: 17 August 1950 (age 76) Angamaly, Ernakulam, Travancore Cochin, India
- Party: Janata Dal (Secular)
- Spouse: Daisy
- Children: Adarsh, Jose
- Website: josethettayil.in

Jose Thettayil (born 17 August 1950) is an Indian politician, trade unionist, advocate, and a member of Janata Dal (Secular). He was the ex- minister for Transport in the Government of Kerala. He represents the Angamaly constituency in Ernakulam district in the Kerala Legislative Assembly.

== Career ==
Jose was born in Angamaly on 17 August 1950 as the son of Thomas Thettayil and Philomina. He received his BSc degree in Zoology from Sree Sankara College, Kalady and Bachelor of Laws (LL.B.) degree from Government Law College, Ernakulam. He entered Politics through Kerala Students Union (KSU), the student wing of the Indian National Congress. He was convener of the Youth Congress, Ankamaly Constituency in 1973. Jose Thettayil was expelled from Indian National Congress in 1975, during the Emergency period. Thettayil joined the erstwhile Janata Party in 1977 and became a State Committee Member and National Council Member in 1980 and Janata Party Vice-President of Ernakulam district in 1981.

== Personal life ==
Jose is married to Daisy. The couple has two sons Jose and Adarsh. Adarsh is married to Jyothis.

As an advocate he was active and notable, as he has served under many designations such as, public prosecutor to the supreme court, public prosecutor to the state, public prosecutor for the state banking sectors, notably has advocated for KSRTC for more than 10 years, and many public sector departments for the state.

== As a public servant ==
Thettayil was elected to the legislative assembly from Angamaly constituency for two tenure periods (2006–2011) (2011–2016). This period of public life was noted for both achievements and accusations.

He is credited with scrupulous and innovative political involvement in public administrations. He is also credited locally with initiating and completing several large projects for the constituency as a member of the legislative assembly, and is known in the local area for completing a higher number of projects than some chief ministers during his tenures. He was credited with introducing the concept of multiplex theatres and malls in KSRTC bus stations for the first time in the country. As Minister for Transport, reforms and initiatives were implemented at a faster pace, aiming to curb bribery at the ground level and reduce the ministerial powers that were considered misused (some of which were later reverted by the newly elected government during 2012-13).

His notable works under ministry:

- Only minister in the cabinet who opposed state's appeal to NHIA for revision of national highway widening limit in Kerala from 60 metres to 30 metres, where even the opposition stood for 30 metres. NHIA suggested 60 metres for the state highway widening, but the political parties pulled threads to narrow the road's width to 30 metres. He faced pressures for his stand against this unethical 30 m proposal, and rather proposed for a 45-metre revision. In Kerala, land acquisitions:vote banks:politics:business have adverse relations.
- private sector transport service providers' caviling demands were given no support as before (major problem faced by public due to private service providers such as taxi, auto-rickshaw, bus operators)
- Introduced astonishing THIRU KOCHI services in the business capital city of Kerala
- the JNNRUM low floor a/c bus services were done with revenue study initiatives by NATPAC
- concept of multiplex theaters and malls in KSRTC bus stations for the first time in the country.
- Introduction of pension to the employees of state transport department for the first in country.
- The most anticipated grease the hand political interventions which caused a weft for the vytilla mobility hub for years was put to an end by initiating and functioning the first phase of the hub with a fast pace.
- number of projects and initiatives both locale and state wise.

== Filmography ==
- 2011: Kanakompathu
- 2014: My Dear Mummy

== Allegation ==
In June 2013, Jose and his son Adarsh Thettayil were alleged by a lady resident of his constituency for having sexually abused her over the course of a year. She released edited versions of bedroom scenes featuring her with the MLA. It was later proved as a consensual encounter, and not a rape. The Supreme Court of India rejected the sexual abuse petition on finding it as "politically motivated". The Bench, headed by Justice T S Thakur, noted that the woman had invited Thettayil to the flat and captured intimate moments on camera. Apparent candidate ruffle was observed later.

== See also ==
- Kerala Council of Ministers
