= Roji M. John =

Indian politician (born 1984)

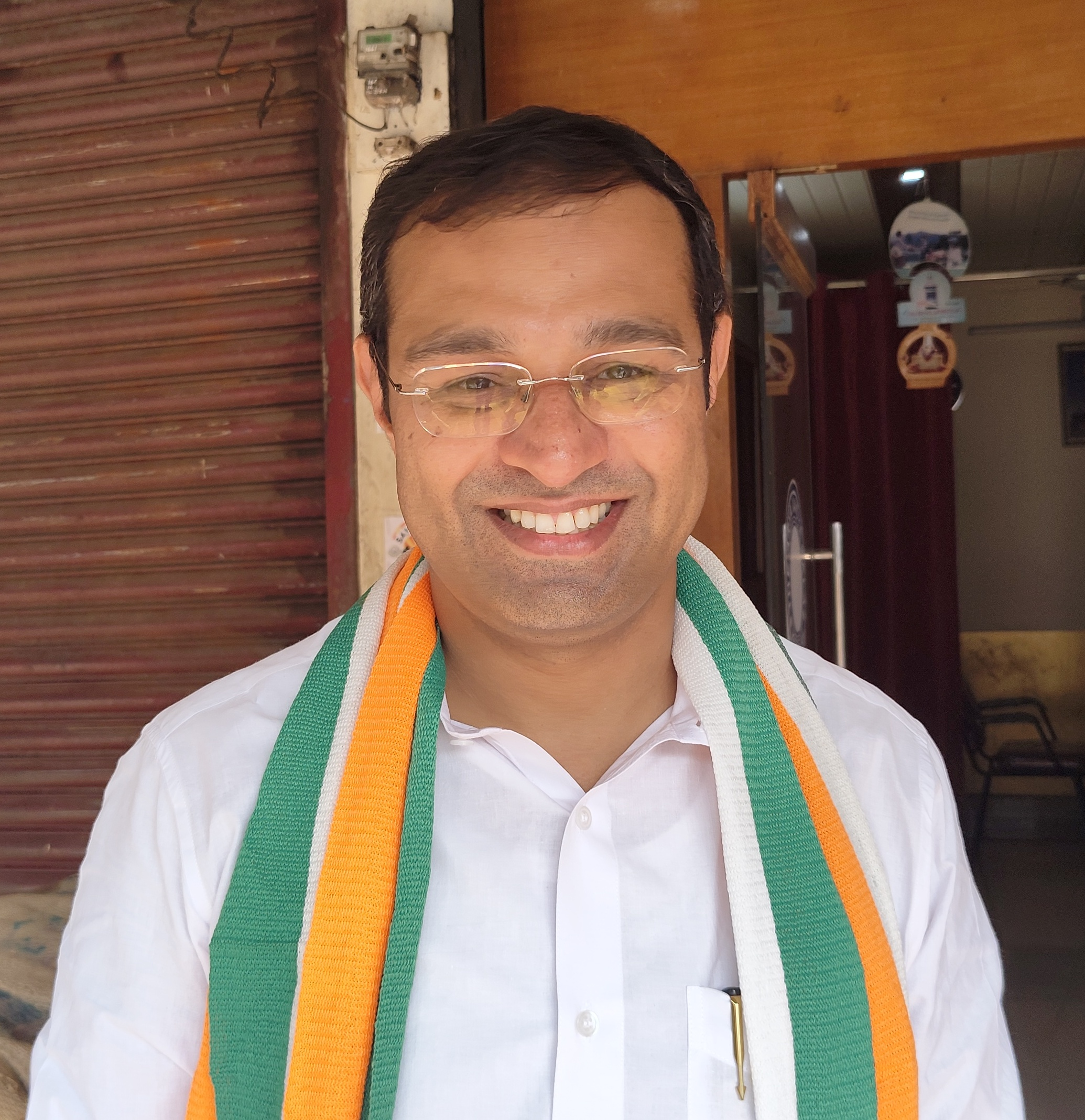

Minister for Higher Education, Government of Kerala
- Incumbent
- Assumed office 18 May 2026
- Chief Minister: V.D. Satheesan
- Departments: See list: Higher Education; Collegiate Education; Technical Education; Universities (Except Agriculture, Veterinary, Fisheries, Medical and Digital Universities); Entrance Examinations; National Cadet Corps; Additional Skill Acquisition Programme
- Preceded by: R. Bindu

Member of the Kerala Legislative Assembly
- Incumbent
- Assumed office 2 June 2016
- Preceded by: Jose Thettayil
- Constituency: Angamaly

Secretary, All India Congress Committee
- Incumbent
- Assumed office July 2022

Secretary, National Students' Union of India
- In office 2014 – 2019

Personal details
- Born: 20 May 1984 (age 42) Thirumeni, Kannur, Kerala, India
- Party: Indian National Congress
- Education: Master of Arts; Master of Philosophy
- Alma mater: University of Hyderabad; Jawaharlal Nehru University, New Delhi

Roji Mullanmadakkal John (born 20 May 1984) is an Indian politician and a member of the Indian National Congress who is currently serving as the Minister of Higher Education in the Government of Kerala. He is a member of the Kerala Legislative Assembly representing, Angamaly constituency since 2016 and again re-elected in 2021. Roji has also served as the president of the NSUI, the national students' wing of the Indian National Congress.

== Education ==
He got Post Graduate in M.A.- Political Science from the Central University of Hyderabad during the period 2002-2003 and 2003-2004. Later he jointed JNU New Delhi. He got M Phil. from the Jawaharlal Nehru University, New Delhi during 2004-2006.

== Election Results ==
Kerala Legislative Assembly Election
| Year | Constituency | Closest Rival | Majority (Votes) | Won/Lost | Vote Share |
|---|---|---|---|---|---|
| 2016 | Angamaly | Benny Moonjely (JS(S)) | 9,186 | Won | 49.26 |
| 2021 | Angamaly | Adv. Jose Thettayil (JD(S)) | 15,929 | Won | 52.11 |
| 2026 | Angamaly | Saju Paul (CPI(M)) | 37008 | Won | 60.17 |
