= V. R. Prabodhachandran Nayar =

Indian linguist

V.R. Prabodhachandran Nayar
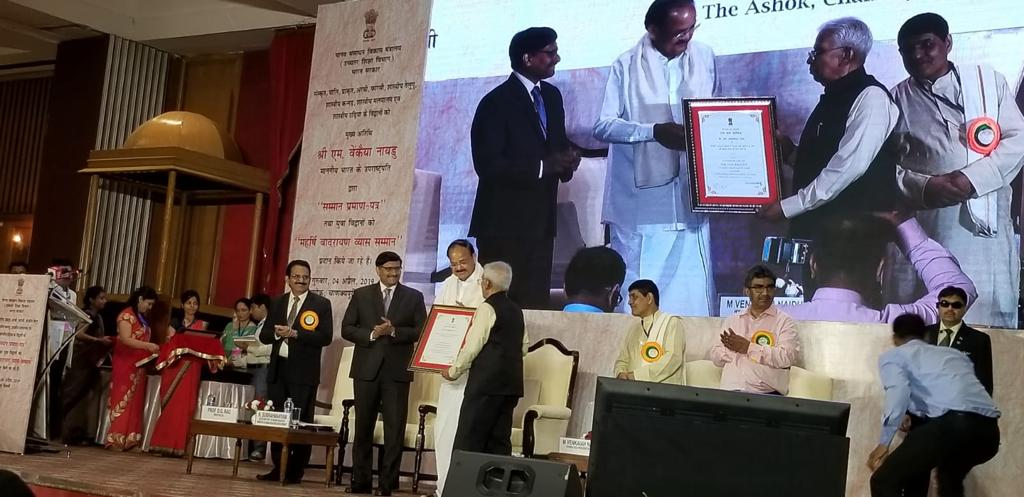
- V R Prabodhachandran Nayar receiving Shreshta Malayala Basha Puraskaaram of Govt. of India, from Honorable Vice President of India, Shri M. Venkiaha Naidu (4 April 2019) New Delhi
- Born: 4 August 1938 (age 88); North Paravoor, EranakulamDistrict, Kerala, India
- Education: Government English High School, N Parvoor BSc, studying Botany, Chemistry, English and Malayalam undergoing the program in the Union Christian College, Aluva, MA degree in the Malayalam Language and Literature in 1959, studying in the University College, Thiruvananthapuram; PhD degree in Malayalam Studies from the University of Kerala (1967) PhD degree is in Phonetics and Linguistics (1970), completing the course work in the School of Oriental and African Studies, University of London
- Known for: Erudition and Expertise in Linguistics and Phonetics
- Awards: Dr. K Godavarma Memorial Gold medal (1959); Commonwealth Scholarship for post doctoral research at the School of Oriental and African Studies, university of London (1967); IC Chacko Award of the Kerala Sahitya Akademy, for the best book in scientific literature (Swanavijnaanam)1981 (Citation); CL Antony Award of the Trissur Sahridaya veedi 1998(Citation); MKKNayar Award of the MKKNayar Memorial Cultural Institute, Pakalkuri 2002 (Citation); NV Krishna Variar Award for scientific literature 2011; Sakthi Thaayaatt Award for scientific literature 2011; Professor CP Menon Award for scientific literature 2013; Mukundaraja Smriti Purasakaaram of Keralakalamandalam(2014)
- Scientific career
- Fields: Reputed Teacher Linguistics with specialization in Phonetics theory and practice of translation and Malayalam studies educationist scholar speaker writer composer-cum-poet patron of arts organizer
- Workplaces: Kerala Kalamandalam; Central University of Kerala; University of Wisconsin–Madison; Calicut Universitycommission; Center for Developing Advanced Computing and for Imaging Technology, Trivandrum kutiyattam Center of the Central Sangeet Natak Akademi, New Delhi; Samskrithi, a multinational organization, promoting Kerala's heritage in classical music. Vivekananda Cultural Institute, TVPM; Thunchan Smaaraka Samithi, TVPM; Ezhuthachan National Academy, TVPM; Kilippaattu monthly, TVPM; Indian Council for Cultural Relations, TVPM Center; Projects Review & Steering Group of the Dept of Information and Technology, Ministry of Communication & Information Technology, Govt of India.

V. R. Prabodhachandran Nayar (also spelled Prabodhachandran Nair), popularly known as VRP Nayar, is a Phonetics expert of Kerala. He is the pioneer in the study of the phonology of the Malayalam language. Apart from phonology, he is also interested in syntax and stylistics.

== Professional career ==
VRP Nayar commenced his professional career in 1959 when he was 20, as a lecturer in Malayalam in the South Travancore Hindu College Nagercoil (Kanyakumari District, Tamil Nadu), the then southernmost college in India. He retired as Head of the department of Linguistics, University of Kerala, Trivandrum, in August 1998. However, he is active as a teacher and was working as a Visiting Professor-cum-Coordinator, at Department of Linguistics, Central University of Kerala, Kasaragod during the years 2012 and 2013.

Association with South Travancore Hindu College, helped him have exposure first to colloquial Tamil and in due course, to the classical language and literature in Tamil. Concurrently he progressed with his PhD program as a part-time Research Scholar under the guidance of Dean Professor / Dr PK Narayana Pillai, in the Department of Oriental Studies, University of Kerala. He was the first recipient of University Grants Commission (India)'s’s Junior Research Fellowship in the Faculty of Oriental Studies in the University. In May 1963 he joined as the only Lecturer in the University's newly established Department of Linguistics and in 1965 submitted his PhD thesis entitled Descriptive Grammar of Krishnagatha, one of the oldest and classic poetic works by the legendary Malayalam poet Cherusseri Namboothiri. In 1967 Dr Nayar was granted a Commonwealth Scholarship for research in Phonetics and Linguistics at the School of Oriental and African Studies in the University of London. His studies in London overshot their stipulated aims, in the sense that he successfully completed another thesis called Malayalam Verbal Forms– A Phonetic and Phonological Study Supported by Experimental Findings which fetched him his second PhD. During this period of research he could make a study tour of a number of libraries and speech-laboratories in the UK as well as in France, the Netherlands, Belgium and Germany. Rejoining his parent Department in Thiruvananthapuram, Dr Nayar was promoted as Reader and subsequently as Professor and in 1981 as Chair-Professor, which position he held till his retirement in 1998. Simultaneously he served on several occasions in the following positions also: Member / Chair, Board of Studies in Linguistics; Member / Dean of the Faculty of Oriental Studies; Director of the International Center for Kerala Studies; Member of the Advisory Committee for the Oriental Research Institute and Manuscripts Library and the Department of Malayalam Lexicon; the first Vice-Chairman of the Council Monitoring the Choice – based Credit and Semester System, introduced for the first time in any University in Kerala.

During his tenure as Professor of Linguistics in the University of Kerala, Dr Nayar organized a number of Seminars, Symposiums, Conferences and Workshops at the regional, state and national levels and successfully completed several Research Projects. After his retirement from the University of Kerala, Dr Nayar served the following institutions as a Visiting Professor and in various capacities as presented here:

1998–2003	School of Letters, Mahathma Gandhi University, Kottayam (MGU)
2003–2008	Department of Comparative Literature and Linguistics, Sri Sankara Sanskrit University(in the name of Adi Shankara), Kalady
2012–2013	Department of Linguistics, Central University of Kerala, Kasaragod
2001–2006	Chairman, Kerala kalamandalam
2001–2006	Chair, Jury for several prestigious awards, including Ezhuthachan Award and State Awards for Kathakali and for Dance
1993–2009	Co-ordinator, Summer in Kerala Program of the University of Wisconsin, Madison, USA
2003–2009	Consultant in Linguistics, C-DAC & CDiT (Center for Developing AdvancedComputing and for Imaging Technology), Thiruvananthapuram.
2007–2011	Member: Advisory Committee of the Kutiyattam Kendra of the Central Sangeet Natak Akademi, New Delhi
Since 2007	Chairman: Samskrithi, a multinational organization, promoting Kerala's heritage in classical music.
Since 1998	Chairman: Vivekananda Cultural Institute, Thiruvananthapuram
since 2000	Chairman: Thunchan Smaaraka Samithi, Thiruvananthapuram.
Since 2005	Chairman: Ezhuthachan National Academy, Thiruvananthapuram
Since 2006	Chairman: Editorial Board, Kilippaattu monthly, Thiruvananthapuram.
2011–2014	Expert Member: Indian Council for Cultural Relations, Thiruvananthapuram.
2005–2009	Expert Member: Projects Review & Steering Group of the Dept of Information Technology, Ministry of Human Resources Development, Govt of India.

== Publications ==
Malayalam

- Vivarthhanaththinte Bhaashaasaasthrabhuumika (Translation - Its Background Linguistics), State Institute of Languages, TVPM (SIL) 1974
- Svanavijnjaanam (Phonetics), SIL, 1980
- Lookabhaashakal (The World Languages)DC Books, 1987
- Ezhuththinte katha (The Story of Writing or the Letter), The Institute of Children's Literature, TVPM 1996
- Malayalam Malayaaliyolam (Malayalam as Much as the Malayaali) SIL, 1999
- Cherusseri (A literary biography of the author of Krishnagatha), Department of Publications, University of Kerala, 1999
- Uchchaaranam nannaavaan (For Improvement in Pronunciation) SIL 2000
- Sailiibhamgikal (The Beauties of Style) SIL 2003
- Hari Nama Keerthanam (Annotated edition of the famous 16th century hymn) Thunchan Smaraka Samithi, TVPM-9, 2009
- Bhaashaasaasthradrshtiyiluute (From the View point of Linguistics), SIL 2009
- Draavidabhaashakal (Dravidian Languages Translation from English of MS Andranov's original book in Russian)SIL 1975
- Chittappetuththiya kathhakalippadangal (Notated Kathakali songs: An anthology of 20 select pieces with introduction and notes) Keralakalamandalam 2004
- SriLalitasasahasranaamasthothramliteral explanation for Lalita Sahasranamam – (Annotated Edition with an introduction)Thunchan Smaaraka Samithi, TVPM-9, 2011
- Bhashasatra Nighandu A thorough insight into the science of language, Kerala Bhasha Institute, TVPM,2012,
- Malayalam Verbal Forms – Phonetics and Phonology of Colloquial Malayalam, with Experimental Findings, Dravidian Linguistics Association, TVPM 1972
- Malayalam: A Linguistic Description, National Research Publications, Kazhakuttam TVPM 1973
- Malayalam for Beginners, Swantham Books, TVPM-10; 1999
- Kathakali Texts in Translation (in Phillip B Zarrilli: Kathakali-Dance Drama Where Gods and Demons Come to Play 2003)
- Vidyarambham CD for Malayalam Self - Study (2001)
- Vision, insights and Innovation (Report of the Calicut University Commission, 2000)
- Malayalam for All India Service Officer Trainees, Dr. V.R. Prabodhachandran Nayar, Publisher: Institute of Management in Government(IMG), Thiruvananthapuram, 2020
- Dr. K. Raghavan Pilla-a literary biography by Dr. VRP, State Institute of Languages, 2020
- Lalitha Ganangal Prabodha sangeetham Valyam-2, National Bookstall, Kottayam 2021 March.
- Prabodhasangeetam, by Dr. V R Prabodhachandran Nayar, Kurukshetra Prakasan, Kaloor Towers, Kochi, April, 2023
- KATHAKALI, An Ocean of Possibilities, Heritage and Present Scenario, by Dr. V R Prabodhachandran Nayar, NYR Ventures, LLC, Burlingon,MA USA, 2025

== Awards ==
- Dr. K Godavarma Memorial Gold medal (1959)
- Commonwealth Scholarship for post doctoral research at the School of Oriental and African Studies, Univ. of London (1967)
- IC Chacko Award of the Kerala Sahitya Akademy, for the best book in scientific literature (Swanavijnaanam) (Citation) (1981)
- CL Antony Award of the Trissur Sahridaya veedi (Citation) (1998)
- MKKNayar Award of the MKKNayar Memorial Cultural Institute, Pakalkuri (Citation) (2002)
- NV Krishna Variar Award for scientific literature (2011)
- Sakthi Thaayaatt Award for scientific literature (2011)
- Professor CP Menon Award for scientific literature (Citation) (2013)
- (Mukunda Raajaa) Smriti Puraskaaram of Keralakalamandalam 9 November 2014)
- Shreshta Malayala Basha Puraskaram, Govt. of India, 4 April 2019.
- Tapasya Kala-Sahitya Vedi's Prof. P Viswambharan Puraskaram, Dec. 2025
- Prof. S. Guptan Nair Foundation's Puraskaram, Feb. 2026

== See also ==
- Dravidian Linguistics Association
- Dravidian Languages
