= Federal Bank =

Indian bank

Federal Bank Limited

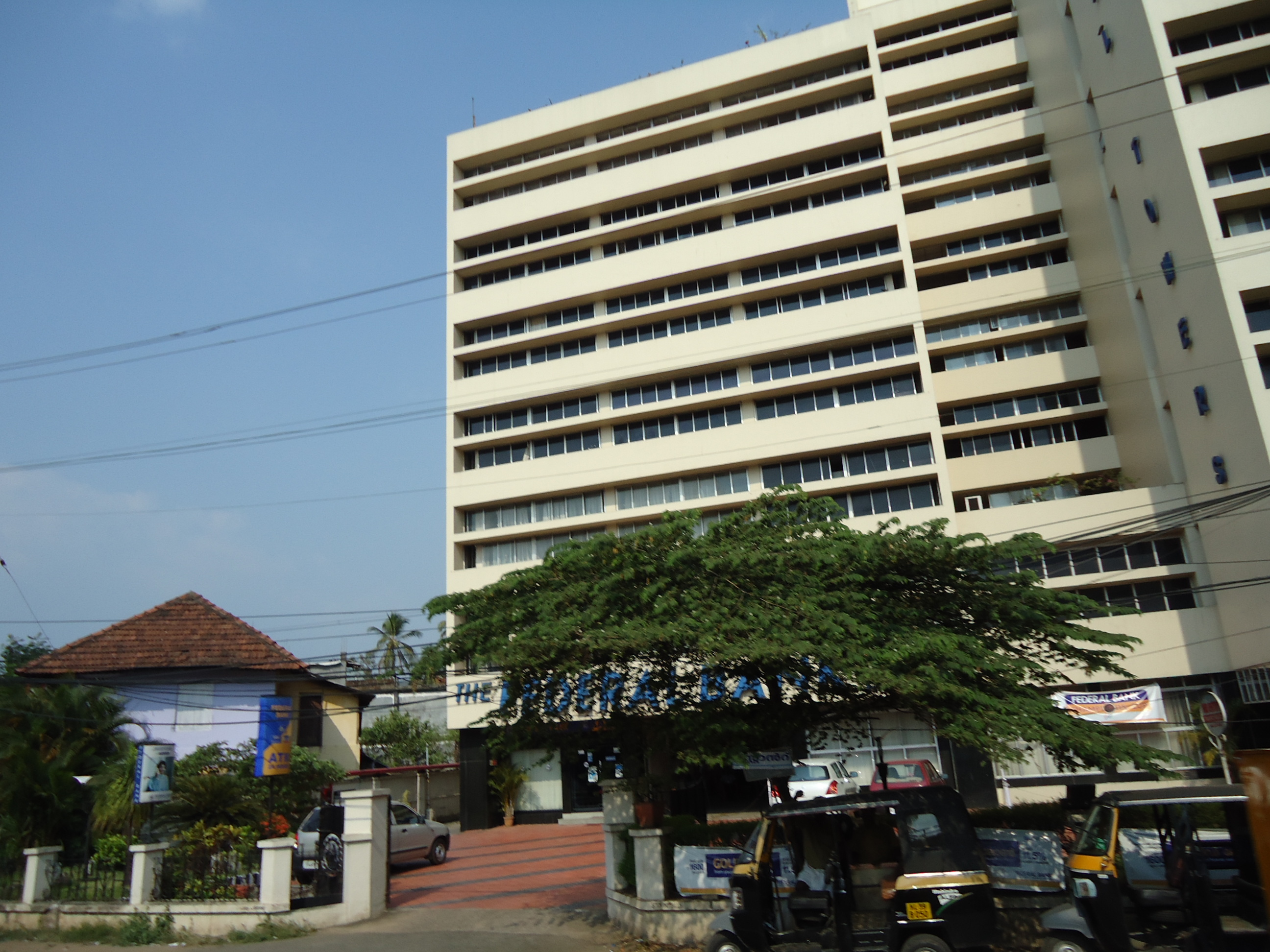
- Headquarters in Aluva
- Trade name: Federal Bank
- Formerly: Travancore Federal Bank
- Type: Public
- Traded as: NSE: FEDERALBNK; BSE: 500469; LSE: FEDS
- Industry: Private bank
- Founded: 23 April 1931; 95 years ago (as Travancore Federal Bank) at Nedumpuram, Thiruvalla; 2 December 1949; 76 years ago (as Federal Bank)
- Founder: K. P. Hormis
- Headquarters: Aluva, Kochi, Kerala, India
- Number of locations: 1,589 branches (2025)
- Key people: KVS Manian (MD & CEO)
- Products: Retail Banking; Wholesale Banking; Finance and Insurance; Mortgage loans; Wealth management; Investment banking; Credit cards; Debit cards
- Revenue: ▲₹32,030.25 crore (US$3.3 billion) (2024-25)
- Operating income: ▲₹6,101.13 crore (US$630 million) (2024-25)
- Net income: ▲₹4,051.89 crore (US$420 million) (2024-25)
- Total assets: ▲₹349,004.80 crore (US$36 billion) (2024-25)
- Number of employees: 16,111 (2024-25)
- Capital ratio: 16.40% (2024-25)
- Website: federal.bank.in

Federal Bank Limited is an Indian private sector bank headquartered in Aluva in Kochi, Kerala. Founded on 23 April 1931 as Travancore Federal Bank, it was renamed Federal Bank Limited in December 1949.The bank has 1588+ banking outlets and, 2079+ ATMs/ CDMS spread across different states in India and overseas representative offices at Abu Dhabi and Dubai.

With a customer base of over 19 million, and a large network of remittance partners around the world, Federal Bank handles more than one fifth of India's total personal inward remittances, approximately. The bank has remittance arrangements with more than 110 banks and exchange companies around the world. The bank is also listed in the Bombay Stock Exchange, National Stock Exchange of India and London Stock Exchange and has a branch in India's first International Financial Services Centre (IFSC) at the GIFT City.

== History ==
The Federal Bank Limited (the erstwhile Travancore Federal Bank Limited) was incorporated with an authorised capital of ₹5,000 at Nedumpuram, a place near Thiruvalla in Central Travancore on 23 April 1931 under the Travancore Companies Act. It started business of auction-chitty and other banking transactions connected with agriculture and industry.

The bank was named Federal Bank Limited on 2 December 1949, after completing the formalities of Banking Regulation Act, 1949. It is considered as one of the major Indian commercial banks in the private sector having more than thousand branches and ATMs spread across different States in India. Between 1963 and 1970, Federal Bank took over Chalakudy Public Bank (est. 20 July 1929 in Chalakudy), Cochin Union Bank (est. 1963) in Thrissur, Alleppey Bank (est. 1964; Alappuzha), St. George Union Bank (est. 1965) in Puthenpally, and Marthandam Commercial Bank (est. 1968) in Thiruvananthapuram. The bank launched its initial public offering in 1994. The bank became a Scheduled Commercial Bank in 1970, which also coincided with the Silver Jubilee Year, since the bank commenced its operation in Aluva.

In January 2008, Federal Bank opened its first overseas representative office in Abu Dhabi. In November 2016, Federal Bank opened its second UAE representative office, in Dubai.

== Subsidiary companies ==
- Federal Operations and Services Limited (Fedserv) is a wholly owned subsidiary company of The Federal Bank Ltd, registered under Companies Act, 2013 on 26 October 2018. The company operates from Kakkanad, Kerala, Indore and Vishakhapatnam, Andhra Pradesh.
- Fedbank Financial Services Ltd – Fedfina is the non-banking financial arm of Federal Bank

== Associate companies ==
- Ageas Federal Life Insurance Company Limited - Ageas Federal is a joint venture between Ageas Insurance International NV, a multinational insurance giant based out of Europe and Federal Bank. Federal Banks holds 26% stake in the company.
- Equirus Capital Private Limited - Federal Banks holds 19.79% stake in the company.

== Governance ==
As of 2026, the banks Board of Directors includes

- Elias George (Part-Time Chairman and Independent Director)
- KVS Manian (Managing Director and CEO)
- Siddhartha Sengupta (Independent Director)
- CA Manoj Fadnis (Independent Director)
- Sudarshan Sen (Independent Director)
- Varsha Purandare (Independent Director)
- Sankarshan Basu (Independent Director)
- Ramanand Mundkur (Independent Director)
- Harsh Dugar (Executive Director)
- Venkatraman Venkateswaran (Executive Director)
- Rajesh Varrier (Non-Performing Independent Director)

== Corporate Social Responsibility ==
Federal Bank has instituted a public charitable trust by name Federal Bank Hormis Memorial Foundation to perpetuate the fond memory of late K. P. Hormis, the founder of the bank. The trust is striving hard to inculcate in people better knowledge and awareness in the field of banking through training programmes, focused seminars, awards and so on. The trust and its activities were inaugurated by the then Union Finance Minister Shri. P. Chidambaram at Ernakulam on 18.10.1996.

For Federal Bank, Corporate Social Responsibility (CSR) has been an inherited and inbuilt element of its culture from the day the bank was founded. The founder's values and ethos based on trust got embedded in the bank's policies and principles which reflect on its day-to-day business. CSR in Federal Bank began with the first act of cultivating banking habits in an agrarian society - to effectively utilise idle money for productive purposes.

- Sanjeevani

In October 2023, Federal Bank Hormis Memorial Foundation, News 18 Network, and Tata Trusts unveiled ‘Sanjeevani- United against Cancer’. ‘Sanjeevani’ mission is to build awareness, encourage screening and testing for Cancer. Through this initiative, the bank aims to raise awareness of the prevention of cancer, helping individuals fight the social stigma associated with the disease and the hesitation to opt for early detection and diagnosis.

In April 2021, News18 and Federal Bank Hormis Memorial Foundation partnered to uplift societal health through its reach across the country through 'Sanjeevani – A Shot Of Life', India's largest private vaccination drive to boost COVID-19 vaccine awareness. The bank led the campaign across 1000 villages of 5 districts of 5 different states touching more than 24 Lakh lives.

- Federal Skill Academy - The Federal Skill Academy (FSA) is a part of the Federal Bank Hormis Memorial Foundation's CSR initiative, aiming to contribute significantly to India's skilling ecosystem. The bank initiated the launch of its 5th and 6th Skill Academy in Chennai and Belagavi in October 2023. The existing 4 centres are in Kochi, Coimbatore, Faridabad and Kolhapur.
- Federal Bank Hormis Memorial Foundation Scholarship – The bank has been offering scholarships since 2005 every year to deserving and needy students to pursue professional courses such as MBBS, Engineering, B Sc. Nursing, MBA, Agriculture (B.Sc.) including BSc (Hons) Cooperation and Banking with Agricultural Sciences conducted by Agriculture Universities under this foundation.
- Speak for India is another positive change in the realm of education, providing the youth of the country the biggest debating platform to voice their opinions. Over 2 Lakh students have benefitted from the same since 2014.
- Mission Mookkannoor - Federal Bank has inaugurated a very significant initiative - Mookkannoor Mission under the Swachh Bharat Abhiyan. This initiative aims to transform the birthplace of the Founder Shri K P Hormis, into a clean and green village.

== Recent awards and recognition ==
- Fortune India ranked Federal Bank among the Top 50 Future Ready Employers of India 2025.
- Feddy, the AI chat bot of the Bank, won the SKOCH Silver Award for its innovative feature - Conversational Banking at the 100th SKOCH Summit.
- Federal Bank awarded the Best CSR Project – Health (Large Enterprises Category) for 'Sanjeevani' programme at the KMA Green Palm Sustainability Summit 2025.
- Federal Bank's innovative product Flash Pay Smart Keychain bagged the Best Payment Experience Award at the 11th Edition Payments Reloaded Industry Awards 2024.
- Federal Bank bagged the Gender Equality Champion Award at the Bombay Chamber's Diversity, Equity and Inclusion (DEI) Awards 2024.
- Federal Bank is recognised as ‘ESG Champions of India 2024’ in the Commercial Banks sector at the Dun & Bradstreet ESG Leadership Summit 2024.
- Federal Bank won the 'Best Bank in AI & ML Adoption' and the 'Best Bank for Financial Inclusion' at the 20th Annual IBA Technology Awards 2024. The Bank is also a runner-up in the category 'Digital Sales, Payments and Engagement'
- Federal Bank is the winner of 'Best Bank in Fintech Initiative' at the Business Today Banking & Economy Summit.
- Federal Bank tops IFC Climate Reporting 2023 charts in four categories. IFC has declared *Federal Bank among Top Financial Institutions for Climate Reporting in 2023.
- Federal Bank is in the Top 30 Future Ready Workplaces of India Inc. by Fortune India, curated in partnership with CIEL HR
- Federal Bank is declared as 'Bank Of The Year 2023' in India instituted by The Banker
- Federal Bank has topped IFC Climate Reporting 2023 charts in four categories
- Federal Bank is the only India based company to feature among India's Best Workplaces™ for Women 2023. The bank was also featured among India's Best Workplaces™ for Millennials 2023 and recognised as the only Commercial Bank in India by Great Place To Work® for building a culture of innovation for all.
- Federal Bank received ‘GOLD’ rating by Indian Green Building Council (IGBC) for Federal Bank Mount Road Branch and Office Premises functioning at Akshaya Shanti and for Federal Bank Thrissur/ Main Branch.
- Federal Bank won the Silver Shield in the ICAI Award in Category II(A) for Financial Reporting for the year ended March 31, 2022. Became the winner for the second consecutive year for an award in this category, having won the Plaque in the previous year
- Federal Bank was awarded the Certificate of Achievement by the International Finance Corporation (IFC), a World Bank Group in recognition of Climate Financing Leadership in the South Asia Region (CSA) during FY 22 for having disbursed US$332.9 million, making it the largest amount of climate loans disbursed

== Controversies ==
In March 2019, the Supreme Court of India stayed a Bombay High Court Special Court order that had directed Federal Bank to pay ₹4 crore (plus 18% annual interest from 1992) to the widow of late stockbroker Harshad Mehta regarding an uncashed pay order issued to a third party.

== See also ==
- Banking in India
- Indian Financial System Code
- List of largest banks
- Make in India
