= Mookkannoor =

- Village
- Interactive map of Mookkannoor
- Coordinates: 10°14′26″N 76°24′58″E
- Country: India
- State: Kerala
- District: Ernakulam

Population (2011)
  - Total: 19,009

Languages
  - Official: Malayalam, English
- Time zone: UTC+5:30 (IST)
- PIN: 683577

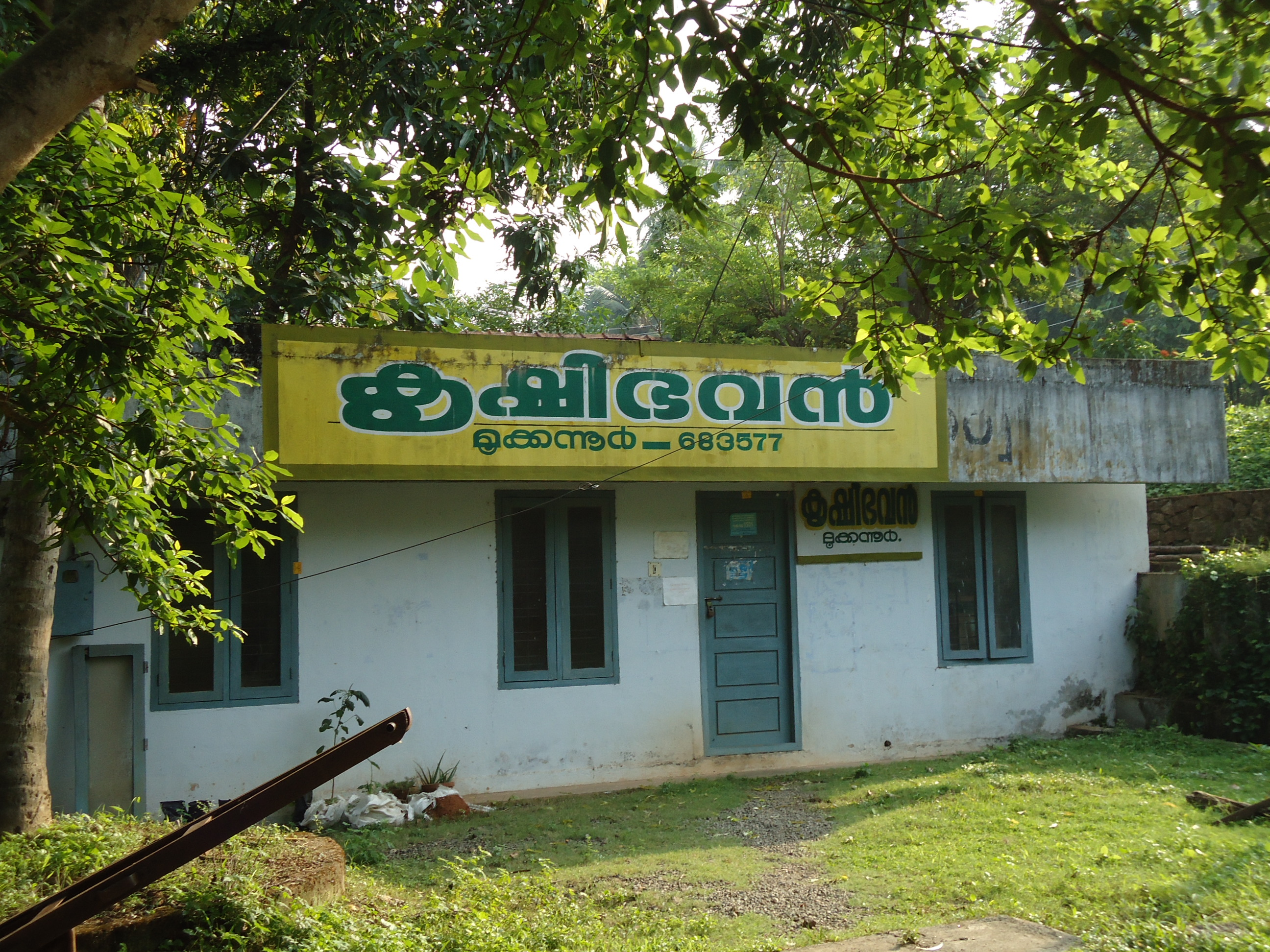
Krishi Bhavan

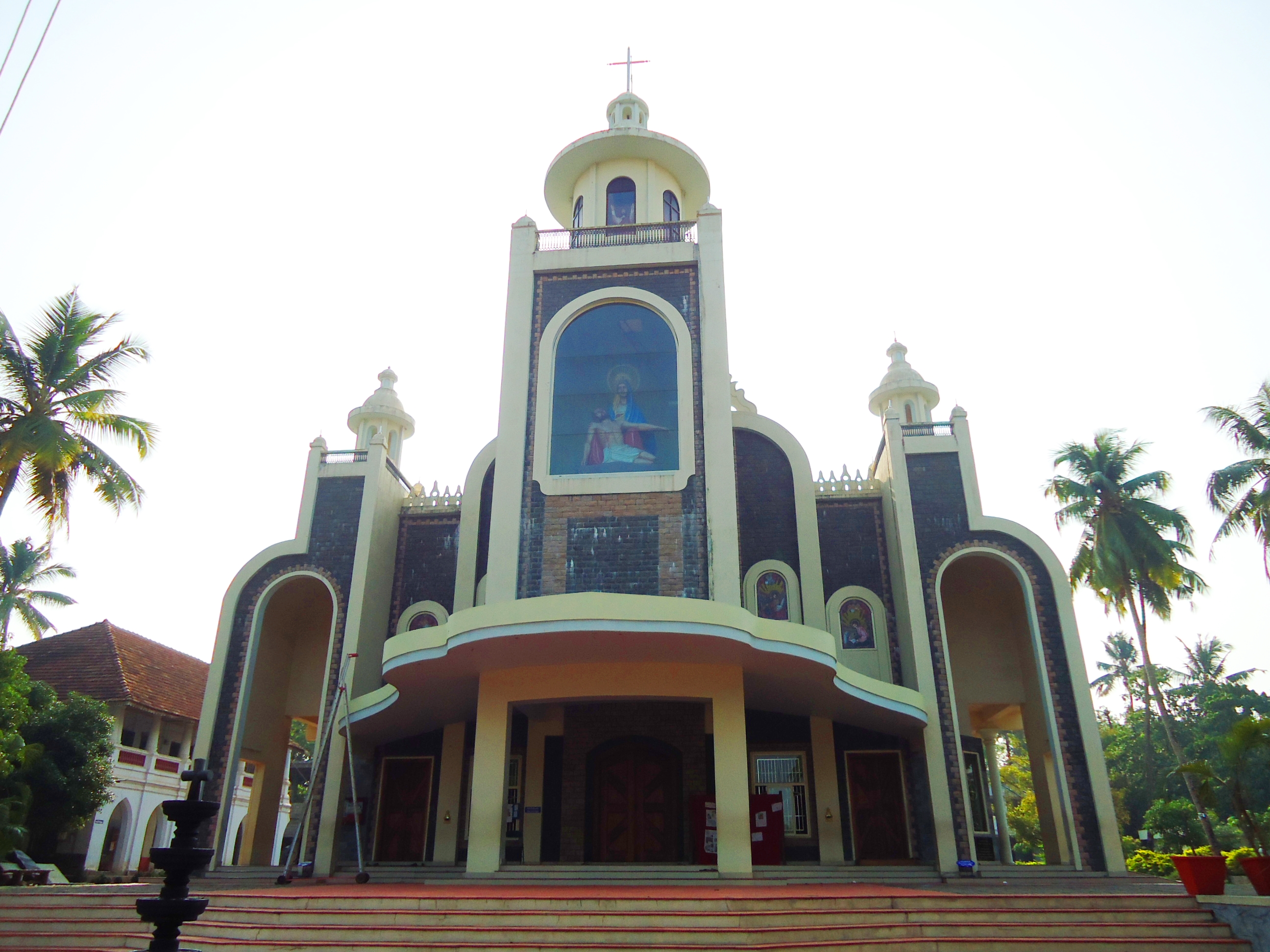
Mookkannoor Church

Mookkannoor is a village in the Ernakulam district in the Indian state of Kerala. The nearest city is Angamaly (6 km). The nearest airport is Cochin International Airport (13 km).

== Demographics ==
As per 2011 India census, Mookkannoor had a population of 19,009 with 9,399 males and 9,610 females. People of Mookkannoor are known for culture and social responsibility. They have a very helpful nature, and welcoming attitude towards visitors. The Catholic religious congregation of St. Therese (CST) was founded here. The Brothers of that community are engaged in various religious and social activities including healthcare, technical training and education in Mookkannoor today. Their hospital is a major centre of medical care and nursing education. Residents of Mookkannoor and nearby areas like Manjapra, Koratty, Karukutty, Palissery, Thuravoor, Anappara, Kidangoor, Thabor are getting medical care at this hospital. Mookkannoor is a small business and cultural hub for people of neighbouring areas.

The Panchayath office, Village office, Post office, Agriculture office and Electricity office, MAGJM hospital are located in the heart of the village. Mookkannoor hosts the self-financing engineering college of kerala - Federal Institute of Science And Technology (FISAT). Mr. K.P Hormis, who is the founder of the Federal Bank, was born in this village. The Mookkannoor branch is one of the branches of the Federal Bank which was started at the founding period. Mookkannoor is known for its educational services provided inside the village, and it is one of the most developed and progressed among the nearby villages and areas in comparison. There are many financial and educational institutions that operate in Mookkannoor now, There are many English medium and Malayalam medium schools, Trade college - ITI which is run by the brothers of the Congregation of Saint Thérèse of Lisieux. The easiest way to Athirappilly is through Mookkannoor - Ezhattumukham or Thumboormuzhi Dam. You can save 25 kilometres if you go through Mookkannoor, especially for the people from Ernakulam.

Mookkannoor is a main road to famous tourist places like the Athirappilly waterfalls, Vazhachal Falls, Thumboormuzhy, the Silverstorm water theme park, Dreamworld water theme park and towards Tamil Nadu. Mookkannoor is very close to the international shrine Malayattor, where St. Thomas the Apostle held prayer when he landed in Kerala and set up a church (1st century). Cochin International Airport - CIAL is also very near to Mookkannur.

== Institutions ==
Educational:

- Govt. Higher Secondary School, South Mookkannoor
- Sacred Heart Orphanage High (SHOHS) School, Mookkannoor
- Holy Family High School, Thobore
- Mother Theresa Primary School, Vattekkad
- Federal Institute of Science and Technology (FISAT) Azhakam
- Balanagar Industrial Training Institute (ITC), Mookkannoor

Industrial:

- He-Man Robopark, Attara
- VPG Crushers, Devagiri
- Kottackal Rice Mills - Mayyil Brand Products
- Pamba Rice Mills - Pamba brand rice

Religious:

- St Marys Catholic Forane Church, South Mookkannoor
- St Alphonsa CST-Monastery Church, Mookkannoor
- St Marys Hermon Jacobite Church, Azhakom
- St Joseph's Catholic Church, Kokkunnu
- St George Sehion Jacobite Church, Mookkannoor
- St Josephs Catholic Church, Paramabayam
- St Sebastian Catholic Church, Devagiri
- Holy Family Catholic Church, Thabore
- St Marys Jacobite Church, Poothamkutty

== Gallery ==
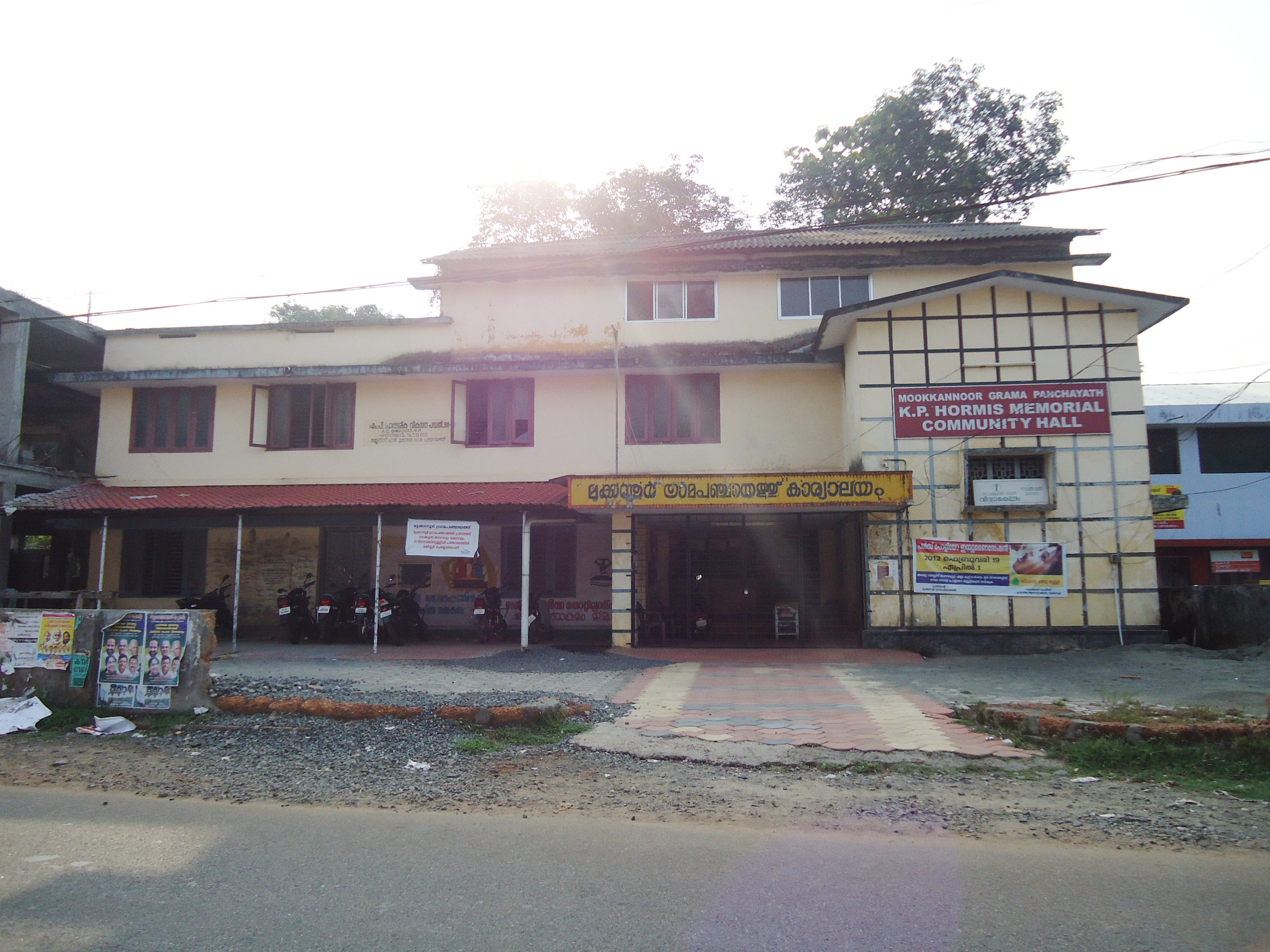
Mookknnoor Panchayat Office

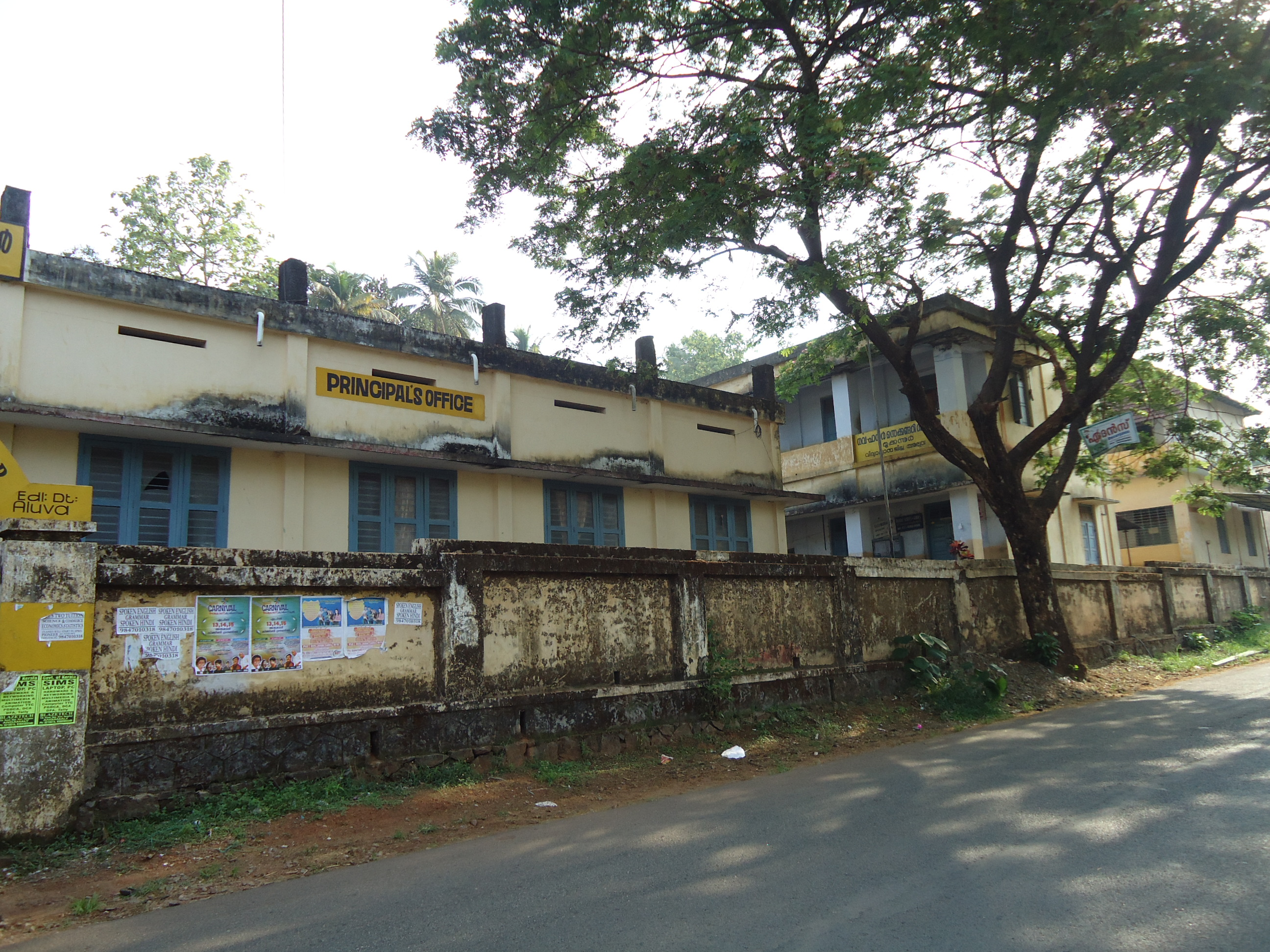
Govt Higher Secondary School Mookknnoor
