= P. J. Joy =

Indian politician (born 1949)

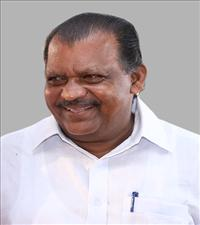

Chairman, Kerala State Bamboo Corporation
- In office March 2012 – May 2016

Member of Kerala Legislative Assembly (MLA)
- In office 1991–2006
- Constituency: Angamaly

Personal details
- Born: 3 December 1949 (age 76) Angamaly, Kochi
- Party: Indian National Congress
- Spouse: Smt. Prof. Santhamma P C
- Children: 2
- As of 21 January, 2016

Puthussery Joseph Joy (born 3 December 1949 in Angamaly, Cochin, Kerala, India), is an Indian politician, Trade Union activist and the former Director and Chairman of Kerala State Bamboo Corporation since March 2012. He is the State Advisory Board Member of Employees' State Insurance Corporation, State Executive Member of Kerala Pradesh Congress Committee, All India Working Committee Member of INTUC from 2009, President of Kerala State Plantation Workers Federation INTUC.

Joy had been previously elected to the Kerala Legislative Assembly as MLA in 1991, 1996, and 2001. He is also the INTUC Kerala State Vice President.

== Early life ==
Joy was born to Mariyam and Joseph of the Puthussery house at Mookkannoor, Ernakulam district of Kerala. He completed his high school life in Angamaly St. Joseph High School and is a degree holder from Kalady Sree Sankaracharya college. Joy married Santhamma in 1989 and has two sons and lives in Angamaly, Ernakulam.

== Political life ==
Joy entered into politics in 1972 after graduation. He was unanimously elected as the President of Mookkannoor Gramma Panchayath in 1979. He became the Angamaly Block Congress President in 1980. He became the Ernakulam DCC General Secretary in the year 1989. He was the member of State Rural Development Board, Advisory Board Member of KSRTC, Member of the Board of Directors of Plantation Corporation Kerala Ltd, Chairman Kerala Legislative Library from 2001 to 2006, the Chairman of the Regional Board of Workers Education, Kochi (2010 to 2014). He received Hajarpathi award from Prime Minister in 2005.
