= Daivampadi =

Hindu caste found in Kerala, South India

Daivampadi (also written as Thaivampadi, Theyyampadi or Theyyambadi) is a Hindu caste in Kerala, India. They form a part of the Ambalavasi community. This caste is also known as Brahmani or Brahmani-Daivampadi. They perform the Kalamezhuthum Pattum rituals in temples.

== See also ==
- Ambalavasi
