= Nedumpuram =

- Village
- Location in Kerala, India Nedumpuram (India)
- Coordinates: 9°22′25″N 76°31′45″E
- Country: India
- State: Kerala
- District: Pathanamthitta

Population (2011)
  - Total: 12,694

Languages
  - Official: Malayalam, English
- Time zone: UTC+5:30 (IST)
- PIN: 689110
- Vehicle registration: KL-27

Nedumpuram is a village in Thiruvalla, Pathanamthitta district in the state of Kerala, India. It Comes Under Thiruvalla Sub-District & Thiruvalla Constituency.

Nedumpuram is the birthplace of Federal Bank. The Federal Bank Limited (the erstwhile Travancore Federal Bank Limited) was incorporated with an authorized capital of ₹5,000 from Pattamukkil Varattisseril Brother's at Pattamukkil Varattisseril Ancestral Home, Nedumpuram a place near Thiruvalla in Central Travancore on 28 April 1931 under the Travancore Companies Regulation, 1916. It started with the business of auction-chitty and elementary banking transactions related to agriculture and industry. The home functioned as the bank office for nearly 15 years.

There is a temple Palliyarathalam Bhadrakali Temple in the neighbourhood of Nedumpuram.

== Demographics ==
As of 2011 India census, Nedumpuram had a population of 12,694 with 5,971 males and 6,723 females.

== Important places ==
- Podiyadi
- Pulikeezu
- Chathankary
- ANC Junction
- Manippuzha

== Educational Institutions ==
- NPGHS, Nedumpram
