= K. B. Unnithan =

Senior political leader

Personal details
- Born: 10 December 1936 Pathanamthitta, Kerala
- Died: 1 June 2017 (aged 80) Sankarayya Road, Thrissur, India
- Party: Nationalist Congress Party
- Profession: Politician social worker

K. Balakrishnan Unnithan known as Prof. K.B. Unnithan (10 December 1936 – 1 June 2017) was a senior political leader in Kerala, India. He was a member of the National Council of Nationalist Congress Party. He was also a social activist and poet – a collection of his poems, "Kaathilola" was published in 2014.

== Career ==
Unnithan entered the public domain through student politics of the Indian National Congress (INC). When INC split, he joined Congress (S), which was reconstructed N.C.P. He served as Thrissur district secretary of Congress (S) for a long time and later as the President and Vice-President of N.C.P. Later, he was elected to the State Council and National Committee of the party. He was also the founding chairman of National Art Culture Committee, a wing of the party.

He was the Treasurer of Thrissur Public Library, Executive committee member of Thrissur Development Authority, Executive committee member of Thrissur Sports Council, Chairman of S.R.V Music College Development Committee and worked in several areas.

He was also connected with film industry and cooperated with Digital Film Makers Forum, a trust for films. He was the chief patron of the trust and was the chairman of D.F.M.F Short Film Festival 2013, conducted by the trust. He portrayed Panicker in the film Jalachhayam.

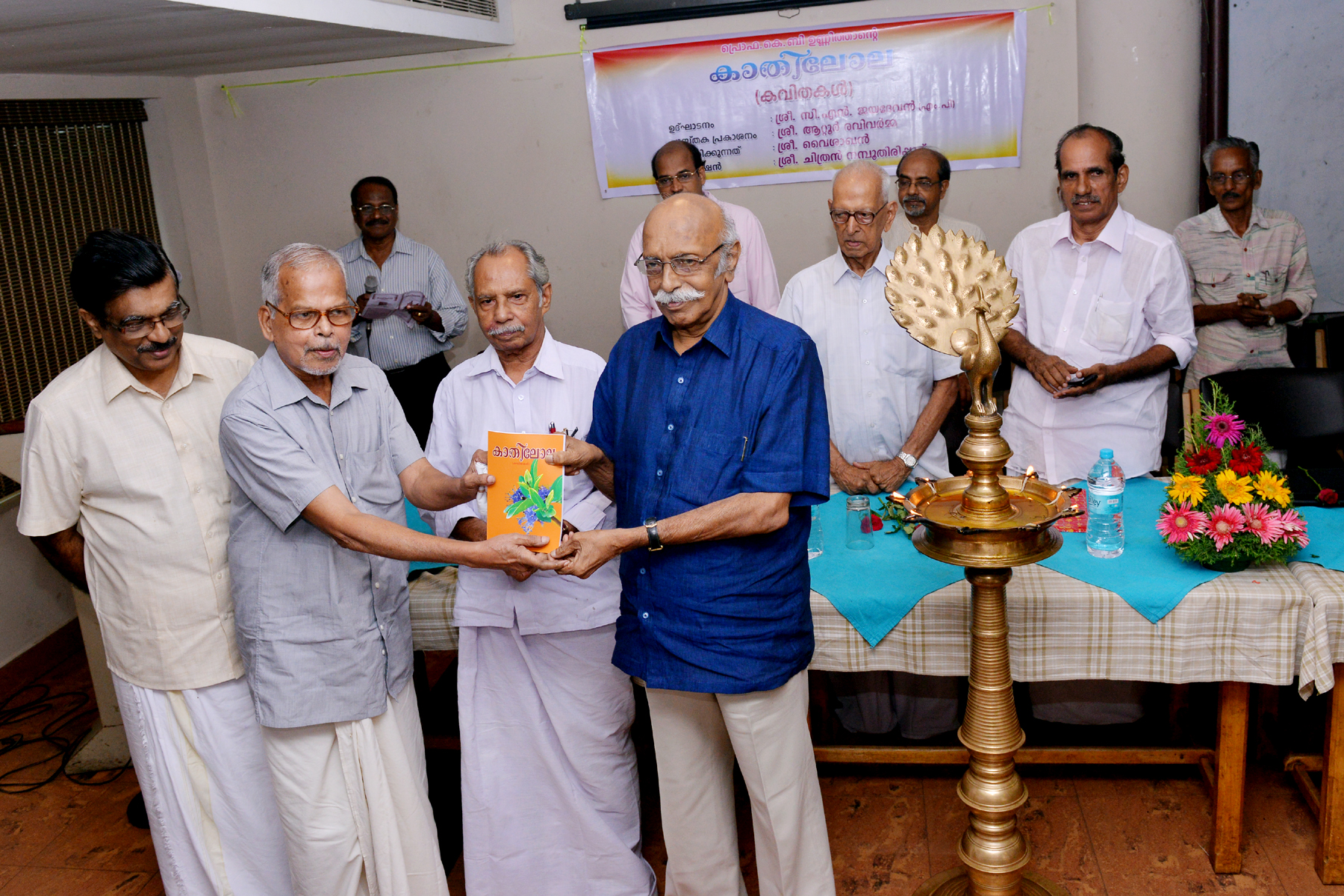
Releasing of Kaathilola

== Book ==
The collection of poems of Unnithan, Kaathilola was released by Malayalam poet Attoor Ravi Varma and the first copy was received by Vaisakhan, Malayalam novelist at Thrissur on 28 September 2014. This book was published by Chaanakyam Publications.

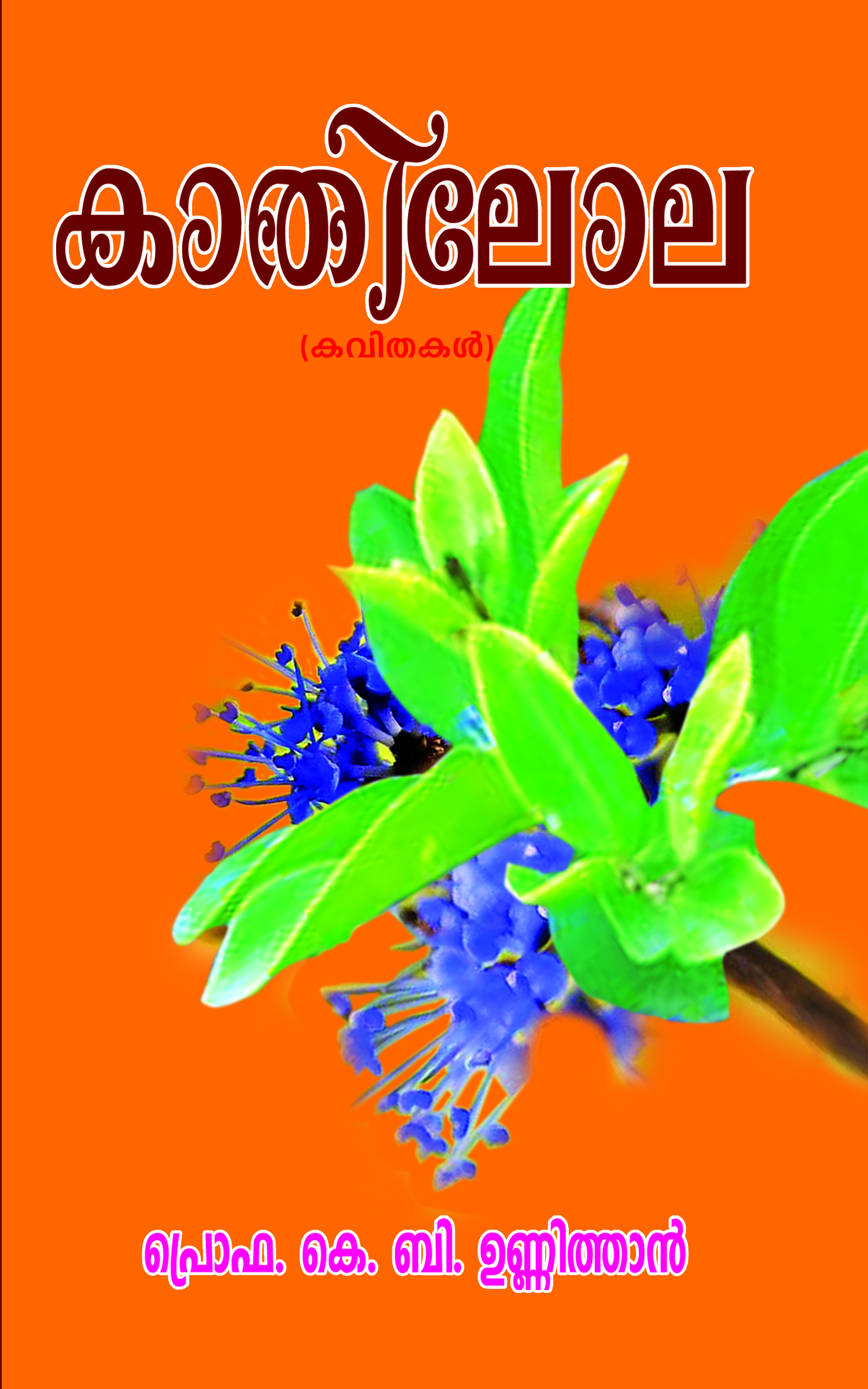
Cover of Kaathilola
