= Ayyampuzha =

Ayyampuzha അയ്യമ്പുഴ
- Village
- Location in Kerala, India Ayyampuzha (India)
- Coordinates: 10°15′0″N 76°28′0″E
- Country: India
- State: Kerala
- District: Ernakulam

Government
  - Body: Angamaly Ayyampuzha Gram panchayat

Population (2011)
  - Total: 14,253

Languages
  - Official: Malayalam, English
- Time zone: UTC+5:30 (IST)
- PIN: 683581
- Telephone code: 0484
- Vehicle registration: KL-63
- Nearest city: Angamaly
- Lok Sabha constituency: Chalakkudy
- Vidhan Sabha constituency: Angamaly
- Civic agency: Angamaly block Panchayath

Ayyampuzha is a village and panchayat in Angamaly, Ernakulam district, in the Indian state of Kerala. Kalady plantations are a part of the panchayat.

== Tourism ==
Ayyampuzha shares the famous Athirappilly Falls with Athirappilly in Thrissur.

== Demographics ==
As of 2011 India census, Ayyampuzha had a population of 14253 with 7227 males and 7026 females.

== See also ==
- Angamaly
- Ernakulam District
- Kochi
