= Theeyaattam =

Type of dance in Kerala, India

Theeyaattam also known as Theeyaattu (Tīyāttu) is a traditional temple dance form of Kerala.

There are two types of Theeyaattam – Bhadrakali Theeyaattu and Ayyappan Theeyaattu. Bhadrakali Theeyattu is performed by Theeyaattunnis (a Brahmin community in Kerala) whereas Ayyappan Theeyaattu is performed by Thiyyadi Nambiars.

== Bhadrakali Theeyattu ==
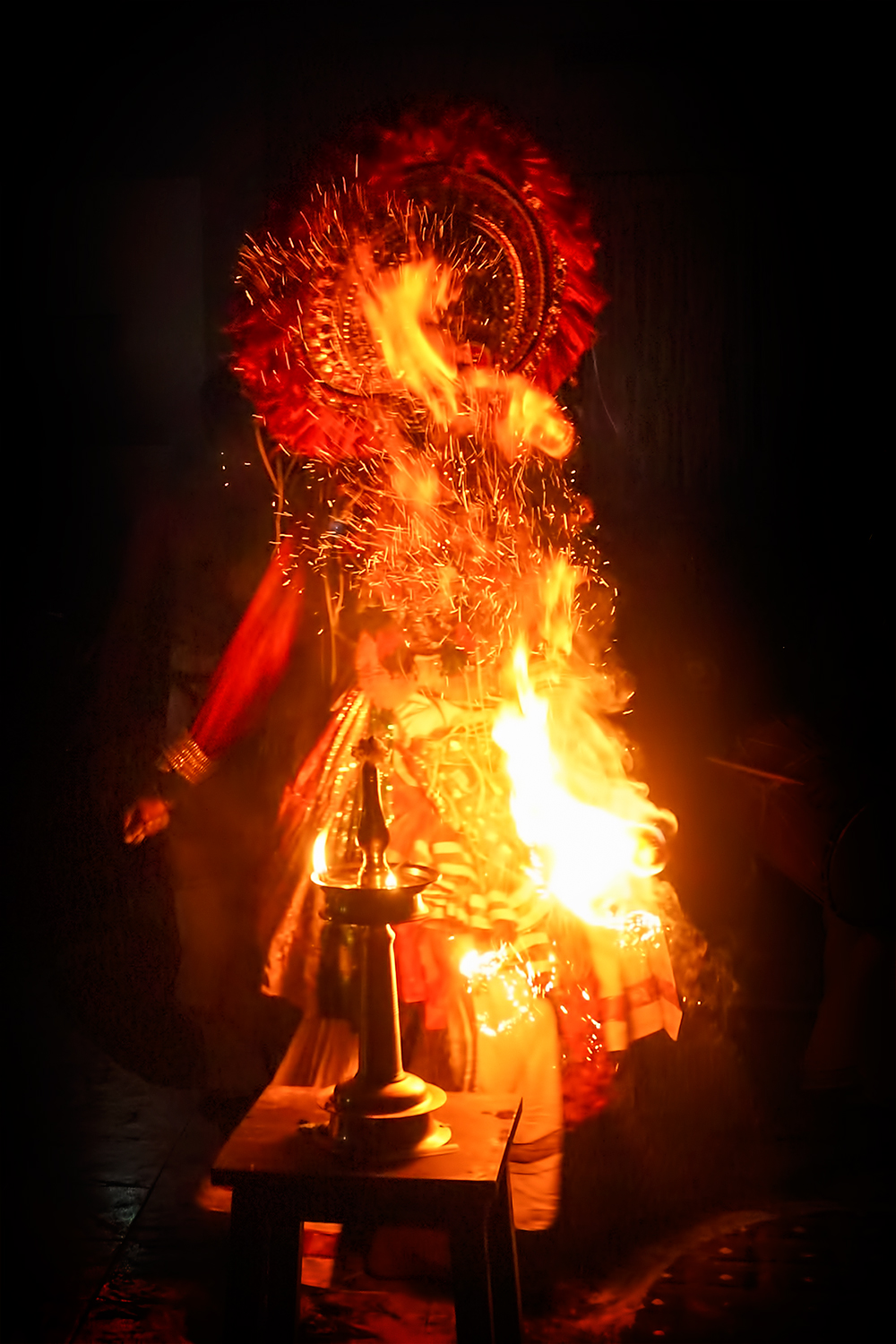
Bhadrakali Theeyattu

Bhadrakali Tiyyattu is a ritualistic dance usually performed in Bhadrakali temples, mostly in the Pathanamthitta, Alappuzha, Kottayam and Ernakulam districts of south-central Kerala. Pallippurathu Kavu at Kottayam (family temple of Kottarathil Sankunni) Thrikkariyoor Mahadeva Temple, Panachimangalath Bhadrakali temple (family temple of Panachimangalath Illam) near Kothamangalam, Vanarkavu at Madakkathanam, near Thodupuzha, Puthukulangara Bhagavati Kshetram (family temple of Choma Elamon Mana) at Peringara are some of the places where tiyyattu is performed during annual festivals. It is also performed as an offering at temples and houses.

The Bhadrakali Theeyattu dance depicts the war of goddess Bhadrakali with Darikasura where finally goddess Bhadrakali emerges as the winner.

The performance has many parts of which – preparation of the ritual art known as kalam (Kalamezhuthu), singing songs in praise of Bhadrakali and the performance of the dance are a few. Kalamezhuthu is done during the day using natural coloured powders on the floor. An elaborate picture of Bhadrakali is normally made. The singing of the songs take place after the Kalamezhuthu is finished in front of it and may last up to three hours. For the dance a male member dresses up as Bhadrakali, a creation of Shiva. In the performance she is just back from killing Darika and is telling the events to Shiva who is symbolised by the lighted lamp. As she was affected by small pox and has pockmarks on her face she has her back to the lamp almost throughout the performance.

Shree Bhadra Kalasamajam, Kottayam made some efforts to revive and reform the art. As it is being as a ritualistic art form and has strict traditional rituals which are strictly followed even now, Theeyattu cannot be modified at one's will.

== Ayyappan Thiyyaattu ==
Ayyappan Thiyyattu is a temple art performed by the Thiyyadi Nambiar community, a minuscule ambalavasi community living (basically) in three central Kerala districts of Thrissur, Palakkad and Malappuram. The all-male art centres around the mythological story of the birth of Lord Ayyappa from the relationship of Lord Vishnu in his ephemeral impersonation as Mohini and Lord Shiva.

The most common version of Thiyyattu involves four phases of presentation: a) Kalamezhuthu (sketching the kalam—picture—of Ayyappa using natural pigments), b) Kottum Pattum (rendition of invocatory songs of Ayyappa and a stylised narration of the story of his birth), c) Koothu gesture-laden dance enacting the build-up story to the delivery of the lord) and d) Velichchappaadu (the slow-paced to frenzied dance of the oracle who eventually erases the kalam—the image of the lord sketched on the sanctified floor). It takes roughly a couple of hours for the kalam (image) of the lord to be completed, after which the rest of the three rituals would consume nearly three hours altogether.

The picture of Ayyappa is sketched and embellished in five natural colours—white (rice powder), yellow (turmeric powder), green (ground semi-dry leaves of the 'vaaka' or manchadi' tree, red (a mix of turmeric powder and slaked lime) and black (powdered charred rice husk). The lord invariably holds his weapons like the sword and the bow-and-arrow, and, in more elaborate versions is sketched mounted on the tiger or the horse.

The songs—accompanied by the beats of 'para', a smaller version of the chenda, and the cymbals called ilathalam—praising the lord bear a mix of quaint old Malayalam and Tamil with a streak of endemic tunes, some of which can be traced to classical ragas of the Sopanam style of Kerala music besides that belonging to the Carnatic idiom. The stylised rendition of the birth of Ayyappa, called Thottam, also sticks to the same mix of languages, but is devoid of music.

The Koothu is enacted with no make-up but a defined set of costumes. Facial emotions are nil, dance movements are minimal and hand gestures would look the less refined versions of Koodiyattam and Kathakali. The Koothu is usually performed to the accompaniment of chenda, ilathalam and 'para'.

The Velichchappadu (oracle), wielding a small sword, is bare-chested but for the garland and, canonically, with a flowy hair; the face either bearded or clean-shaven. Around the waist, he is draped in cloth pieces of white and red colours. The oracle begins with slow steps while circumambulating around the 'kalam', but the tempo gains with the circles he make—around 9 or 11 of them, overall. Then he leaps onto the image in a frenzy, but is calm when he later erases the image with both legs. The face of the lord alone is erased with the (right) hand. Out from the 'kalam', the oracle utters 'revelatory' sentences in (presumed) trance – 'kalpana' as they are called. The devotees are distributed with the prasadam which is the mixed powder used in the 'kalam'.

The art is sometimes staged in bigger forms that last from dawn to late night when it is called Udayasthamaya Thiyyattu. In such cases, the Koothu would deal with twelve stories ahead of the birth of Ayyappa. Such performances usually feature the challenging 'Pantheeraayiram', which is when the oracle would take a (three- to four-hour-long) break from the circumambulations to break (dehusked and sufficiently polished) coconuts totalling 12,000 to the rhythmic beats of chenda-and-ilathalam concert that would gain speed towards the climax.

The Thiyyadi Nambiar families, despite their existence in central Kerala, enjoy the popularity of their art more in the upstate Malabar belt. Some experts/historians trace this pattern to the community's possible southward flee from their original north Malabar homes during the controversial temple destruction spree of the 18th-century Mysore king Tippu Sultan. Mulankunnathukavu Thiyyaadi Raman Nambiar, in his book "Ayyappan Theeyattu" gives a lively narration of the traditional art and acknowledges the support from V. R. Prabodhachandran Nayar in coming out with this invaluable narration of the age old Kerala art form.
