= Theeyattunni =

Caste of Hindu Brahmins of Kerala, India

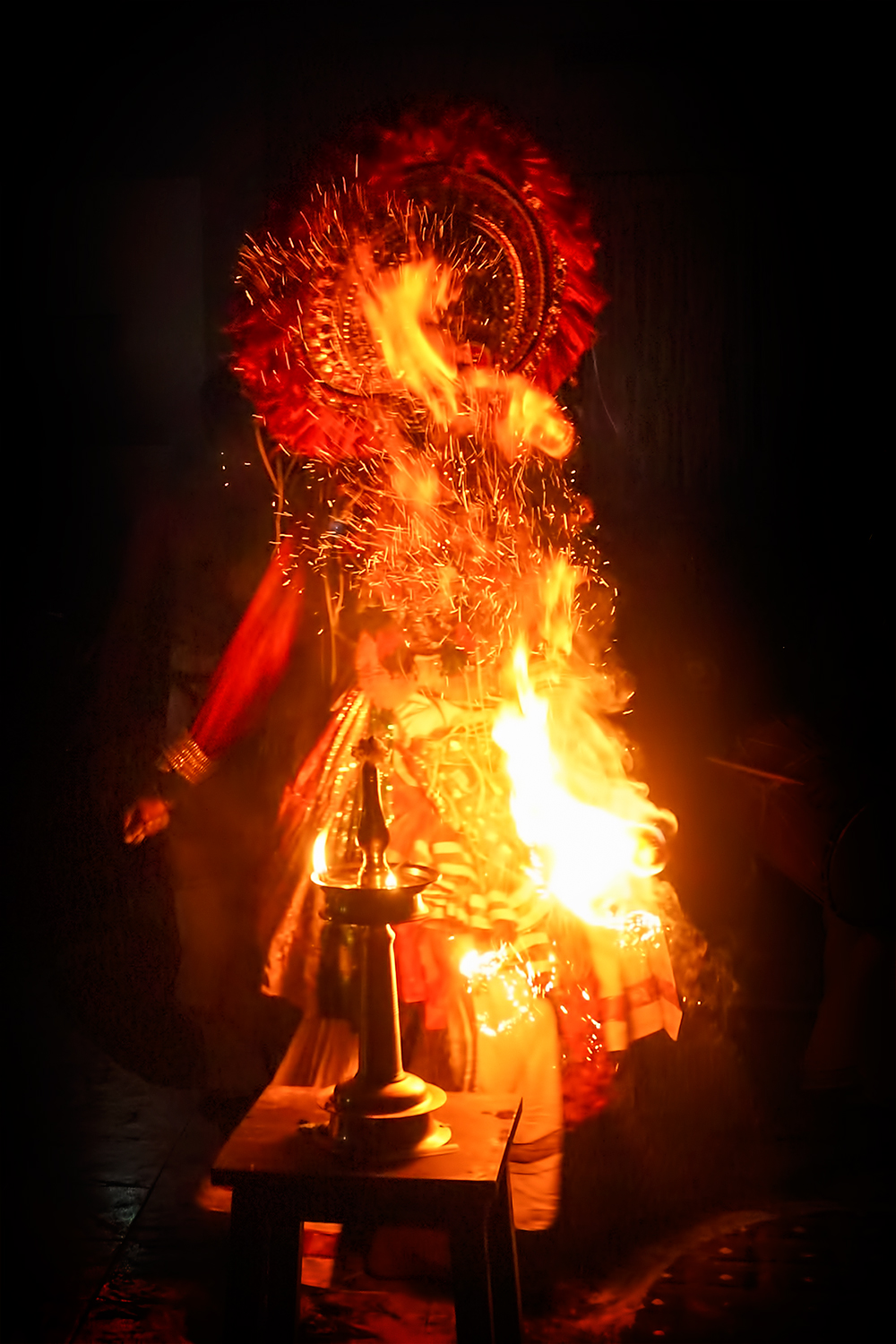
A Theeyattu performer

Theeyattunni (also written as Theeyatt Unni) or Theeyadi Unni is a caste of Hindu Brahmins of Kerala, India. They are a part of the Pushpaka Brahmins and Ambalavasi community in Kerala. Theeyattunnis are traditionally the performers of an ancient art form called Theeyatt. Theeyattunnis have the right for Tantric Poojas and other privileges enjoyed by the Nambudiri caste.

== See also ==
- Pushpakan Unni
- List of Ambalavasis
