= Valiathan =

Valiathan, alternatively Vallyathan, is a title, and now family name, held by a group of Nair families, all branches along the matrilineal line of the main Valiathan family, who are known as the Valiathan.

According to legend, it is said that the Maharajah Marthanda Varma of Travancore sought the help of the Vattaparambil, later Valiathan, family in order to overcome the powerful clan of Ettuveetil Pillamar, the Lords of the Eight Houses. The Maharajah and his heir apparent, the popular Dharmarajah, therefore addressed the oldest, and most powerful, lady of the Vattaparambil House as Valiyamma. Later the lord of the House died in battle against the Ettuveetil Pillamar, leaving the family without a head figure. When Marthanda Varma finally became king, he gave the title of "Valiathan" to the family.

The family is based in Keerikad (Fort Vattaparambil). They also have branches in Thiruvalla and Pandalam. The Thiruvalla branch had marital relations with the Nedumpuram royal family there while the Pandalam family, known as Thottathil, had relations with the Royal Family of Pandalam.

Today, these three families, known collectively as the Valiathans, constitute a subcaste of the Nair community. They are not permitted to intermarry as they are matrilineal branches of the same family under the Marumakkathayam law.

== Notable people ==
- M. S. Valiathan (born 1934), an Indian cardiac surgeon
- V. S. Valiathan (1919–2006), an Indian artist
