= Kerala Janapaksham =

Political Party in Kerala, India

Kerala Janapaksham ('Kerala People's Party') is a political party in Kerala, India. The party is led by K. Raman Pillai. Pillai is the president of the party. Pillai had previously been a leader of the Bharatiya Janata Party, but formed Kerala Janapaksham in 2007. Baby Ambatt was appointed as the party's general secretary in May 2010.

The party offered critical support to the Left Democratic Front.

The party had a cultural wing called Bharatiya Janapaksham. The party had also a trade union wing Kerala Thozhilali Paksham with K.Raghunath serving as the President

== Return to Bharatiya Janata Party ==
Kerala Janapaksham party founding president K. Raman Pillai announced that the party would be dissolved and that they would return to Bharatiya Janata Party in March 2016
