= Kurukkal =

Gurukkal
- Classification: Other Backward Class
- Religions: Hinduism
- Region: Kerala; Tamil Nadu
- Related groups: Ambalavasi, Tamil Brahmin

The Kurukkal, also known as Gurukkal are an Ambalavasi caste of Tamil origin. Originally a patrilineal community found in Travancore and Malabar region of present-day Kerala, whose traditional function was that of temple servants, they became matrilineal towards the end of the 18th century under the influence of Nair caste. Their rank lies below the Nambudhiri, Varma, Pillai, Sacred thread wearing Ambalavasi castes of Travancore and Malabar. Kurukkal women had hypergamous marriages with higher caste men of Travancore and Kurukkal men struck similar relationships with women from the matrilineal Maran caste.

The community's position in the Hindu ritual ranking system known as varna is disputed. In Kerala, they generally claim to be Tamil Iyer Brahmins and Ambalavasi caste.
