= Pushpaka =

Caste of Hindu Brahmins of Kerala, India

Pushpaka is a caste of Hindu Ambalavasis of Kerala. In Malayalam language, this caste is also referred to as Pushpakan, Pushpakar, Pushpaka Unni or Pushpakan Unni. They are a part of the Ambalavasi community in Kerala.
