= Demographics of Nair community =

The total population of the Nair community is disputed, since there has been no caste-based census since 1931. However, various sources cite figures ranging from 12% to 15%. There is also the practical difficulty of certain Nair subcastes considered as independent castes. Out of the citizens eligible to vote in Kerala, around 12% or 15% belong to the Nair community. The most reliable population figures comes from two sources. The BCRC estimated Nair population at 14.47% of the total population of Kerala based on a statewide sample survey conducted for the reservation of seats in educational institutions.

The Nair population historically and currently remains concentrated in the capital districts. The Nair population in Thiruvananthapuram and Ernakulam districts has been increasing since the beginning of 19th century. The Nair population has been declining in Kerala, with some districts having only a small percentage of Nairs. For example, Malappuram has a Nair population of 1.8%, and Kasargode has about 2.1%.

== Population estimates (Forward Subcastes) ==
=== Travancore (south Kerala) ===
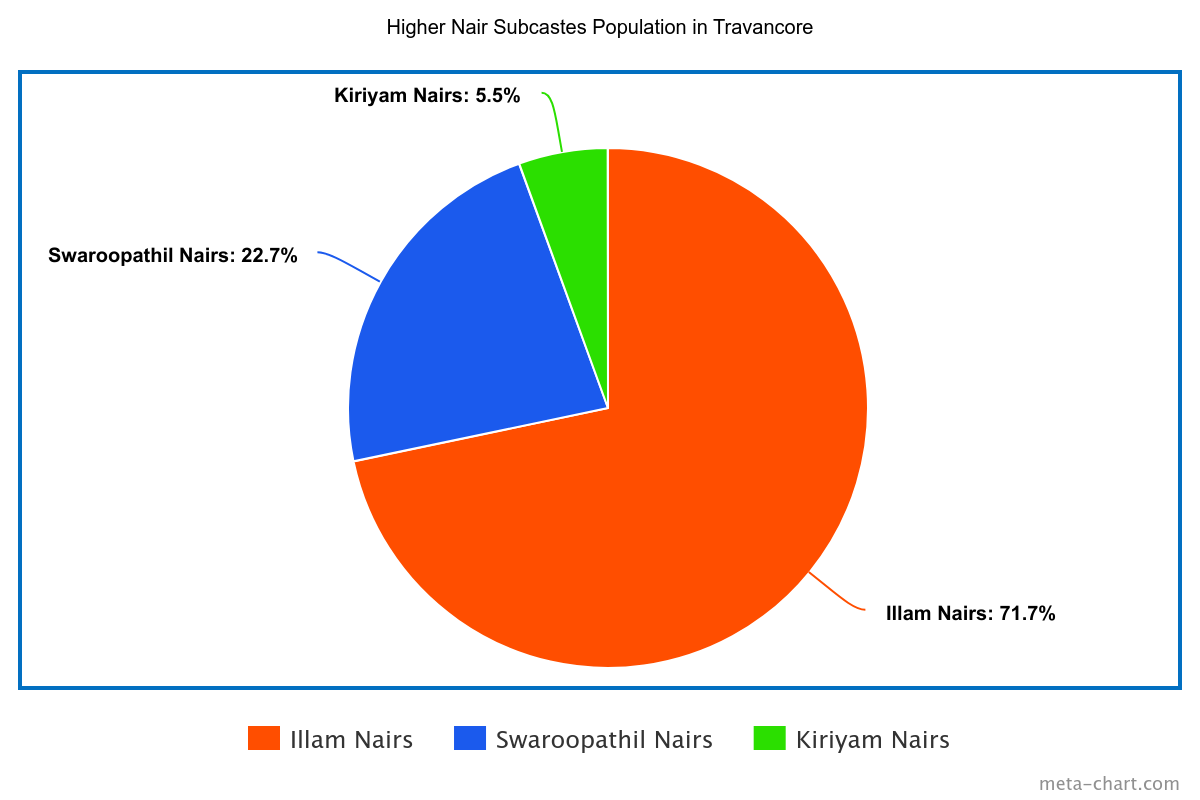
Higher caste Nair population in Travancore based on old surveys

Illam Nairs constituted more than 70% of the total forward caste Nair population. Pillai, Kurup, Thampi, and Meenachil Karthav, are the common surnames used by Illam Nairs were gifted by the Venadu and Travancore royal families to affluent Nairs. They were the major aristocratic warrior class, Naduvazhi and Deshavazhi in Travancore before the 19th century and considered as highest of all Nairs.

Swaroopathil Nairs formed the second-largest forward caste Nair population in Travancore, accounting for more than 22% of the total Nair population. They were found only in Travancore and were a major military caste who mostly soldiers of Illam Nair landlords and administrators in Swaroopams.

Approximately 5.5% (25,164) of the population is recognized as Kiriyam Nairs, who rank between the Illam and Swaroopathil Nairs in Travancore.

=== Malabar (north Kerala) ===
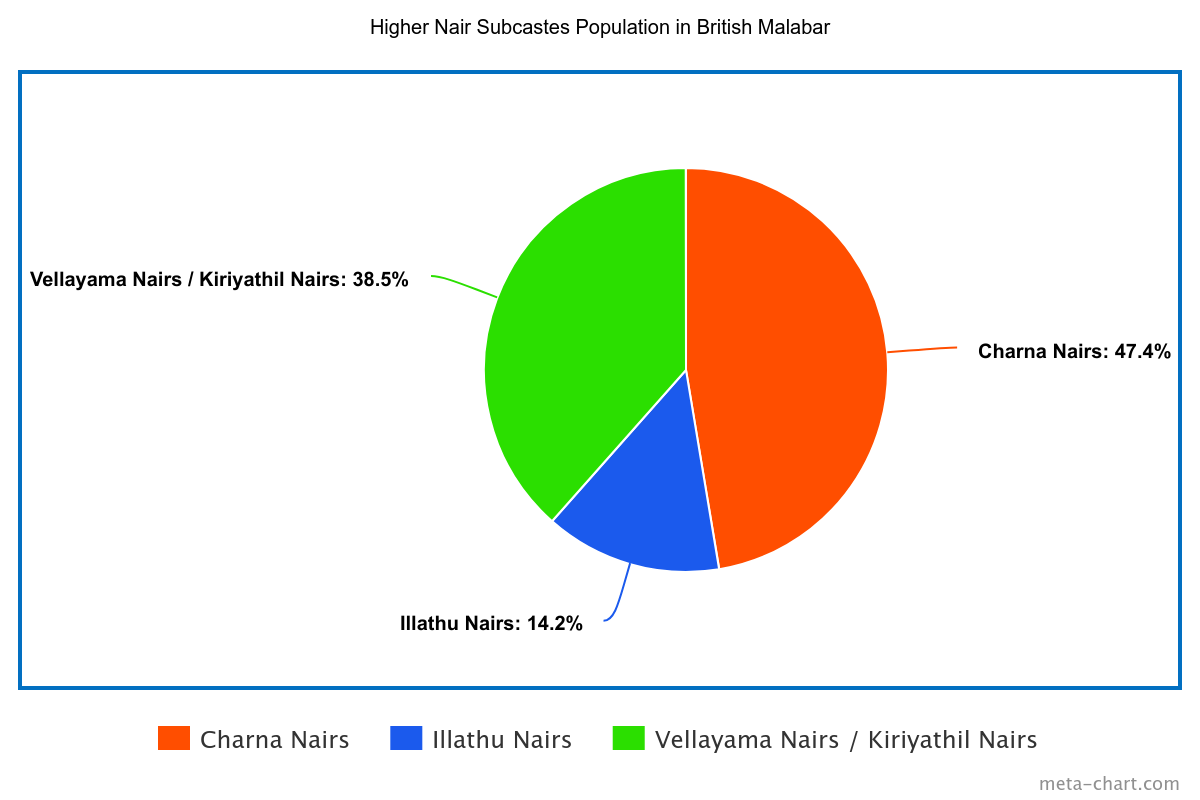
Higher subcaste Nair population in Madras (Malabar) based on old surveys

Kiriyathil Nairs, also known as Vellayama Nairs, are considered the highest subcaste among forward caste Nairs in Malabar Districts, Kiriyathil Nairs mostly found in the Palakkad district, with a very small population in Kannur district. Kiriyathil Nairs, along with the recently added corresponding castes Nambiar (Nair) and related castes, they comprising less than 38% of the total Malabar Nairs and second largest forward Nair subcaste in Malabar districts. They were wealthy Nair families from Malabar.

Illathil Nairs make up around 42,429 (14%) of the total Malabar Nairs. They were warriors and managers of Nambudiri Brahmin landlords. Brahmin-dependent Nair subcaste found only in British Malabar and Cochin.

The Charnavar or Cherna Nairs are the most populous Nair subcaste in British Malabar, constituting around 50% of the total Malabar Nair population. They were the soldiers, accountants, and ministers in Malabar. They were further divided into Akathu Charna and Purath Charna Nairs and were ranked below Kiriyathu and Illathu Nairs.

=== Cochin (central Kerala) ===
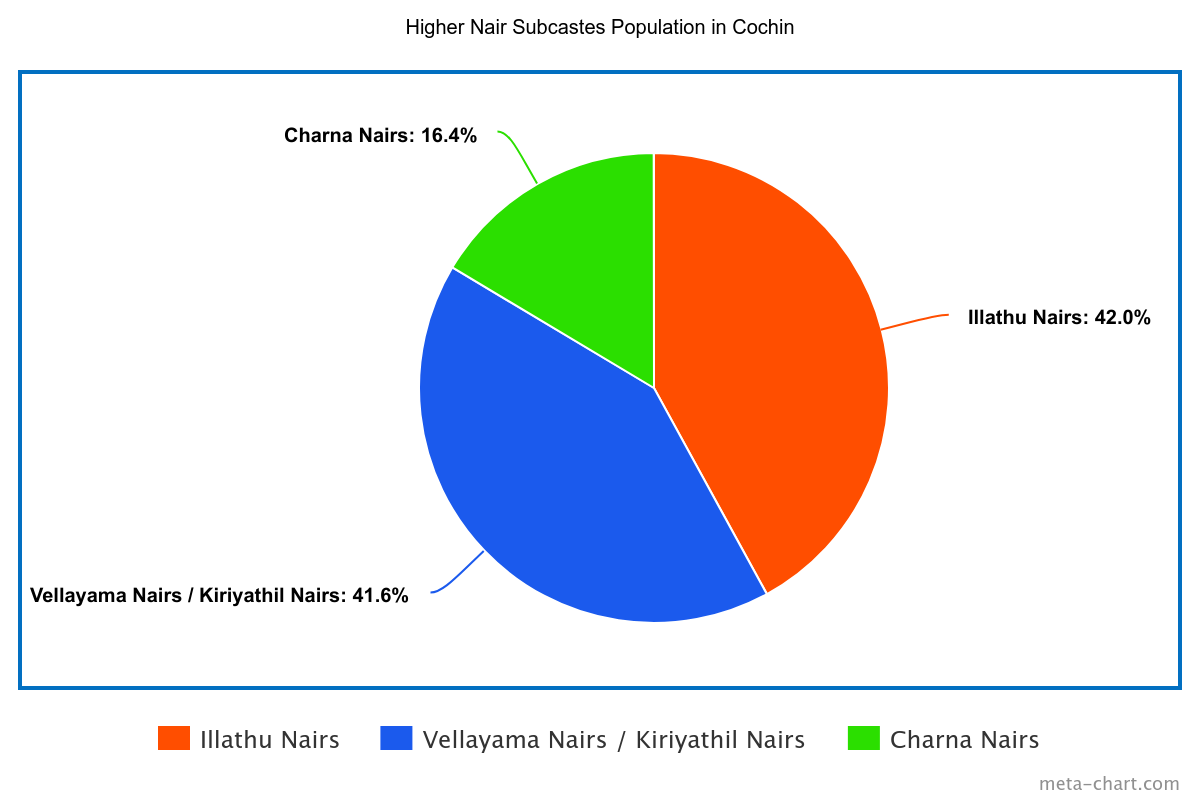
Higher caste Nair population in Cochin based on old surveys

In Cochin, Illathu Nairs formed 42% of the total Nair population. Kiriyam Nairs made up 41%, while Charnavar Nairs constituted 16%.

== Population estimates (District-wise) ==
Household sample surveys conducted by the Kerala Statistical Institute, the last of which were in 2000, produced estimates which were:

Distribution of Nairs in Kerala - District-wise.

Distribution of Nair population in Kerala.
District	Total District Population	Nairs in District		
District	Total District Population	Numbers	% of District Population	% of Total Nairs in Kerala
Kasaragod	1,203,000	36,000	3.0%	0.8%
Kannur	2,412,000	584,000	24.2%	13.1%
Wayanad	787,000	152,000	19.3%	3.4%
Kozhikode	2,878,000	504,000	17.5%	11.3%
Malappuram	3,630,000	80,000	2.2%	1.8%
Palakkad	2,617,000	330,000	12.6%	7.4%
Thrissur	2,975,000	223,000	7.5%	5.0%
Ernakulam	3,098,000	316,000	10.2%	7.1%
Idukki	1,129,000	111,000	9.8%	2.5%
Kottayam	1,953,000	227,000	11.6%	5.1%
Alappuzha	2,105,000	352,000	16.7%	7.9%
Pathanamthitta	1,232,000	174,000	14.1%	3.9%
Kollam	2,584,000	793,000	30.7%	17.8%
Thiruvananthapuram	3,235,000	575,000	17.8%	12.9%
Kerala total	31,838,000	4,457,000	14.9%	100.0%

== See also ==
- List of Nairs
- Nair ceremonies and customs
- Nair Brigade
- Nayanar (Nair subcaste)
