= Orawankara Neelakandhan Namboodiri =

Orawankara Neelakandhan Namboodiri (1857–1917) was a scholar and poet from British India.

== Early life ==
Neelakandhan Namboodiri was born in 1857 in Nambudiri Oravankara Illam in Annamanada, Thrissur district. He received his initial training in Sanskrit from his father, but, at the age of 17 he left to study in Kodungalloor under Vidwan Kunhirama Varma.

== Literature ==
Many of Neelakandhan's poems were lost, and only those written after 1882 are available. The majority of them are devotional which are scholarly and pregnant with philosophy. His important works include Baalopadesam, Kuchela Vritham (Ottanthullal), Varadopaakhyaanam, Bhaimee Parinayam (drama), Deveemaahaatmyam, Azhakapuri Varnanam, Ambika Vinisati.

== See also ==
- Malayalam Literature
