= There Comes Papa =

1893 painting by Raja Ravi Varma

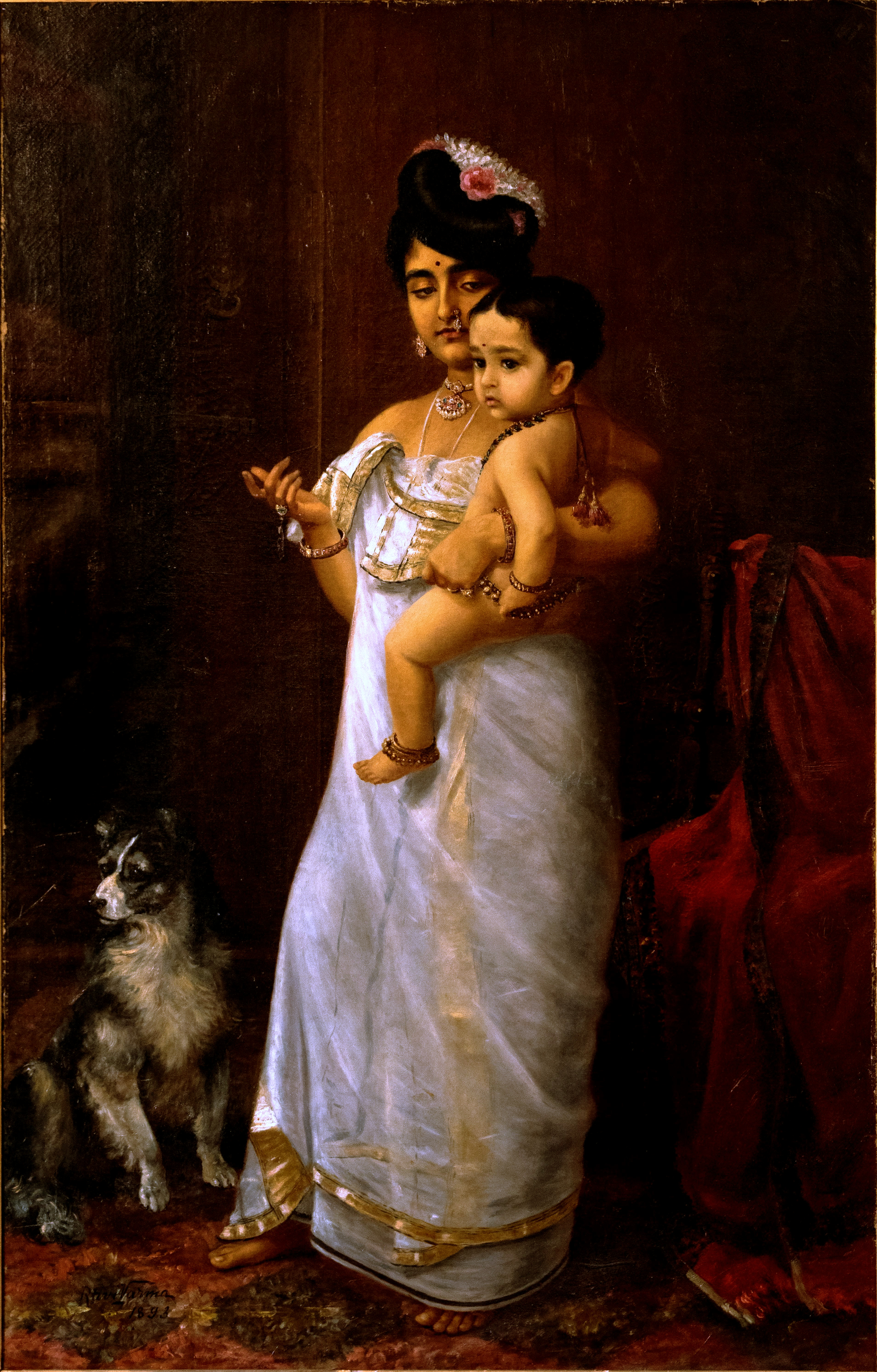
- Artist: Raja Ravi Varma
- Year: 1893
- Type: Oil on canvas
- Location: Kowdiar Palace, Thiruvananthapuram

There Comes Papa is an 1893 painting by the Indian artist Raja Ravi Varma. The painting focuses on Varma's daughter (Mahaprabha Thampuratty) and grandson (Marthanda Varma), looking towards the left at an approaching father. Evoking both Indian and European style, the painting has been noted by critics for its symbolism regarding of the Nair matrilineal practices.

== Background ==
The Nair people of Kerala followed a matrilineal system of inheritance based on a large joint family called the Tharavad. The system allowed men and women to enter and leave relationships with very little difficulty. During Sambandam event, men would visit the woman's household and present her with clothes and gifts, and after obtaining the consent of both the family and the woman herself, the men could enter into a relationship with the woman.

The mid-nineteenth century to the early twentieth century saw the disintegration of this system. Due to shifting morals and new laws, the once matrilineal and matrilocal system of kinship were redefined. Ravi Varma's paintings of Nair women were reflective of this newfound redefinition of societal roles, combining European influence and native tradition.

== Technique ==
During the mid 19th century, Indian artists sought to modernize Indian art whilst retaining its identity. Raja Ravi Varma was one of the leaders of this movement, and employed techniques from well-regarded European artists to represent the Indian ideals of domesticity and femininity. Varma's naturalism, shading, and lighting techniques in his oil paintings were well-regarded among his contemporaries, though the naturalism in his work, considered a Western import, came under criticism in the early 20th century.

== Analysis ==
The painting depicts Raja Ravi Varma's daughter holding her child in the central frame. Both characters, as well as the dog, look out from the frame towards an approaching figure.

The painting gathers the viewer's focus and evokes investment through participation, while showing elements of Ravi Varma's imagination and European influence. For example, the dog — an animal regarded in Indian culture to be unclean — correlates to the European idea of domesticity. The figure of his daughter, believed to be modeled from a photograph, is dressed as was typical for an upper-class Nair, but the woman's stance is evocative of European styles.

Social and cultural historian G.Arunima describes how the painting could evoke many themes to the viewer. For some, the painting represents combined Eastern and Western artistic technique. For others the painting simply depicts an upper-class Nair woman in a domestic Kerala setting. According to Arunima, for the audience of the late nineteenth century, the scene carries more meaning. The absent but approaching father (who the audience would not know was approaching without reading the title) represents the Nair matrilineal system. The nuclear family depicted acts as a call for the end of matrilineality.

Critic Niharika Dinkar notes:

"With the dog on her right, it is clearly a bourgeois offshoot of contemporary Victorian images of the expectant mother waiting for the father to complete the picture of the small, happy nuclear family. The central figure in the painting was Ravi Varma’s own daughter, someone whose own life was spent within the traditional tharavad, yet she is represented here as an icon for the new family ideal."

The absence of male figures in Raja Ravi Varma's paintings are significant. The behavior between men and women were distant and formal. As part of the matrilineal system, fathers were usually insignificant to the larger household and had little emotional connection to their wife or kids. Varma's inclusion of women yearning for their husbands signified a new emotional investment between spouses.

== Exhibition and legacy ==
The painting was part of a series of paintings titled "The Life of Native Peoples" that were shown in the 1893 World's Fair in Chicago. The set of paintings were displayed in the ethnography section rather than the fine arts section. Varma was awarded two certificates of merit praising his realism, form, and detail, among other qualities. This was widely publicized in Indian newspapers at the time, though later critics criticized the racial patronization at the exhibition.

Currently, the painting is displayed at Kowdiar Palace in Thiruvananthapuram.

The painting was one of the several remade by the artist David Kalal featuring various LGBT models.

== See also ==
- Feminist art criticism
- Indian painting
