= Nambudiri =

Malayali Brahmin caste from Kerala, India

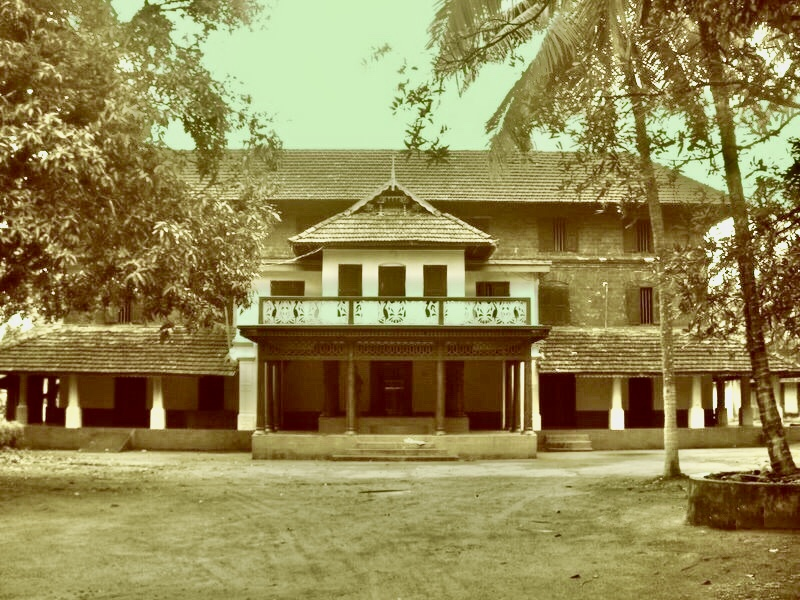
A traditional Nambudiri Mana

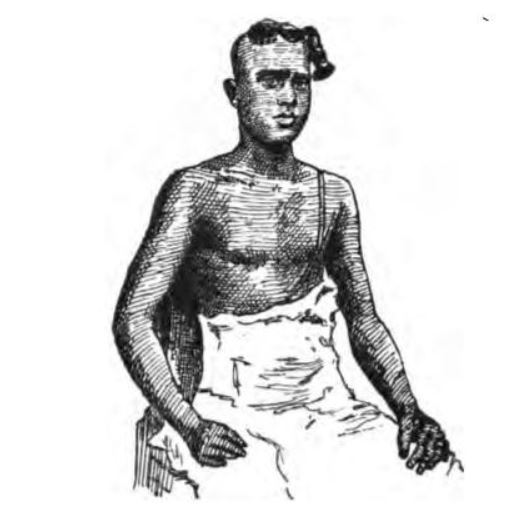
1883 sketch depicting a Nambūdiri man with the traditional pūrvaśikhā, or forelock

The Nambudiri (Malayalam: [n̪ɐmbuːd̪iɾi, n̪ɐmbuːɾi]), also transliterated as Nampoothiri, Nambūdiri, Namboodiri, Namboothiri, Namboodri, Namboori, and Nampūtiri, are a Malayali Brahmin caste, native to what is now the state of Kerala, India, where they constituted part of the traditional feudal elite. Headed by the Azhvanchery Thamprakkal Samrāṭ, the Nambudiris were the highest ranking caste in Kerala. They owned a large portion of the land in Malabar District, and together with the Nair monarchs of Kerala, the Nambudiris formed the landed aristocracy known as the Jenmimar, until the Kerala Land Reforms starting in 1957.

The Nambudiris have traditionally lived in ancestral homes known as Illams and have been described by anthropologist Joan Mencher as, "A wealthy, aristocratic landed caste of the highest ritual and secular rank." Venerated as the carriers of the Sanskrit language and ancient Vedic culture, the Nambudiris held more power and authority than the kings and were "above and outside the political systems of the kingdoms."

== History ==
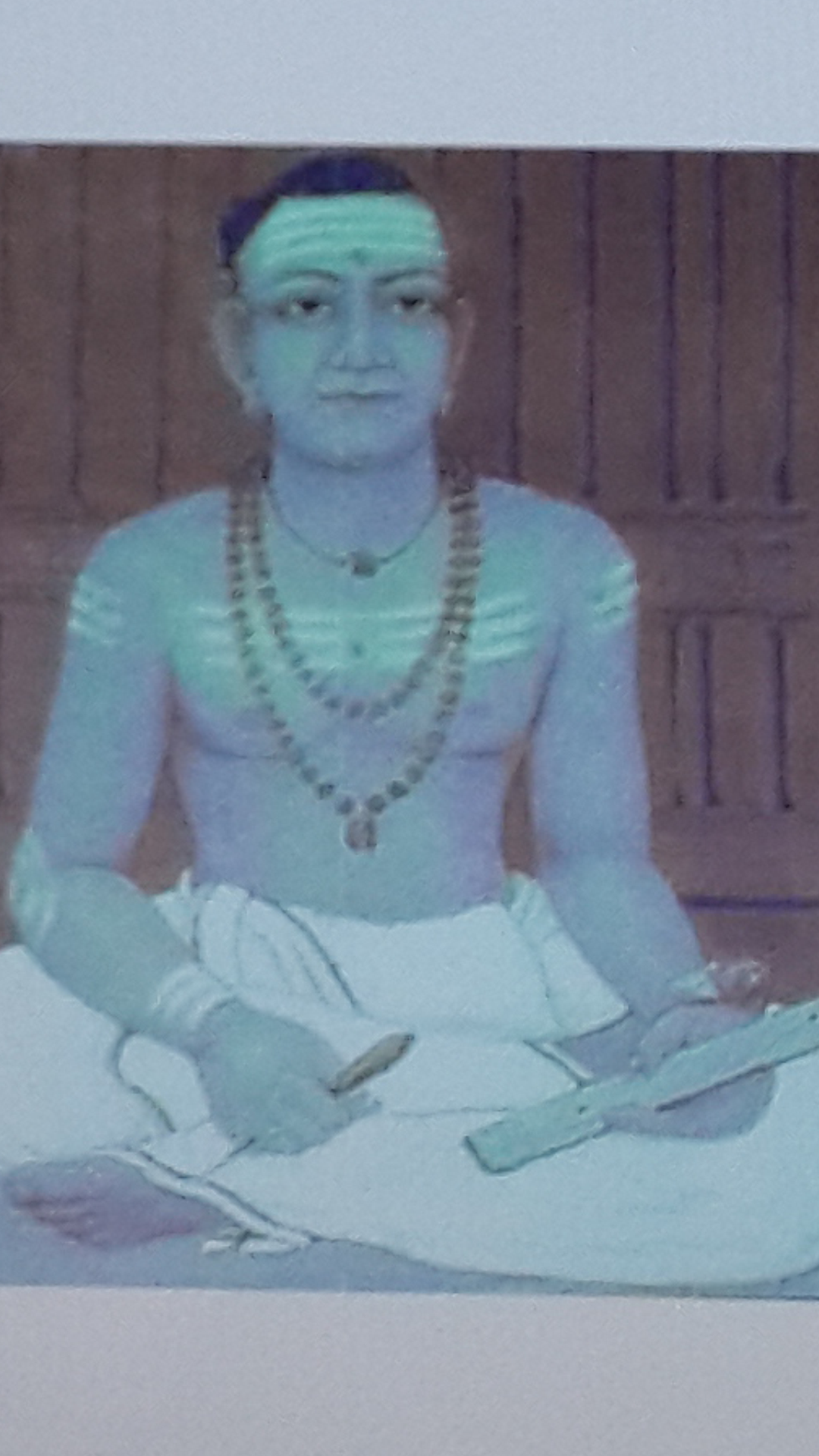
Cherusseri Namboothiri, a Malayalam poet of the 15th-century who composed several landmark literary works

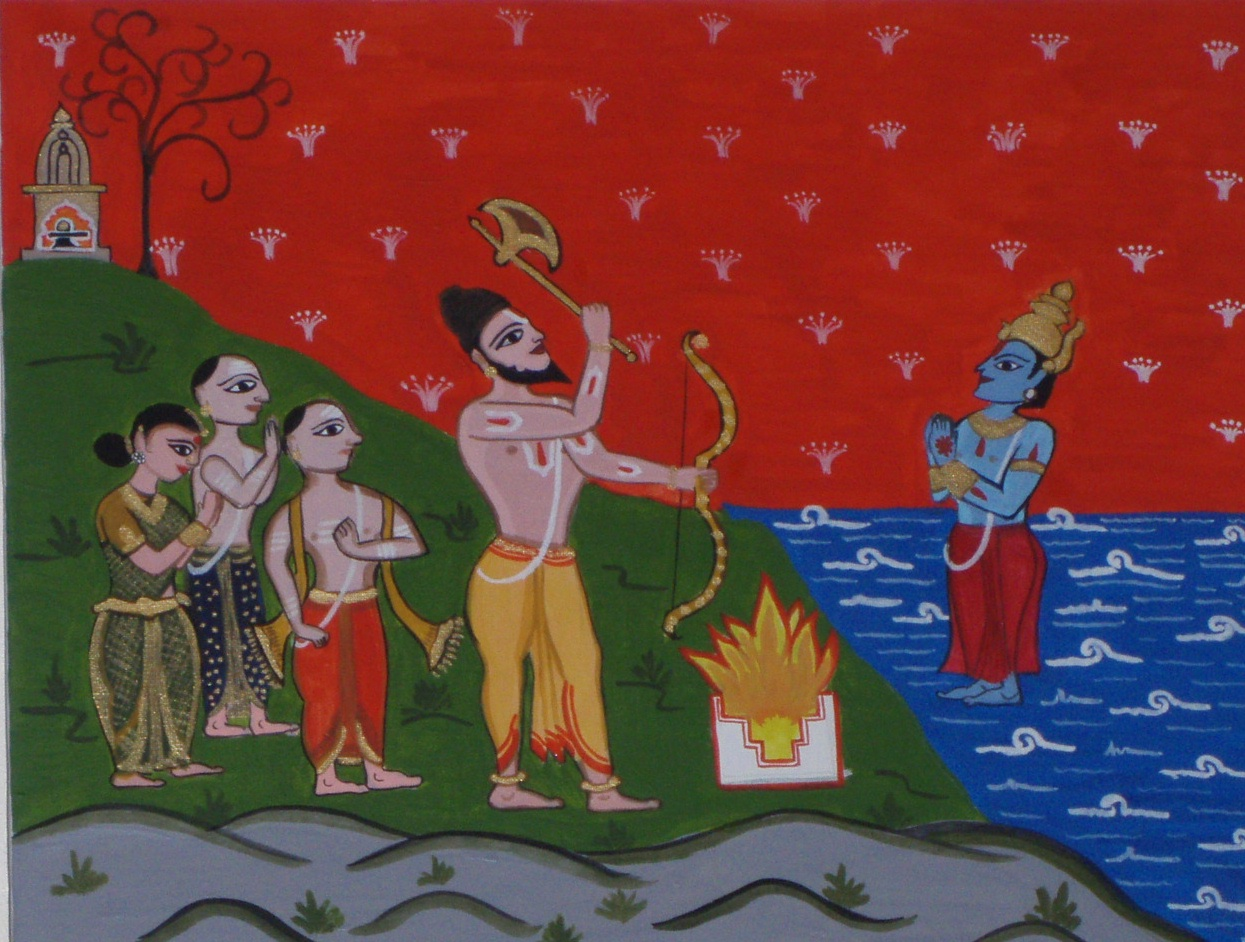
The Nambudiri associate their immigration to Kerala with the legendary creation of the region by Parashurama.

=== Origin ===
Nambudiri mythology associates their immigration to Kerala from the banks of Narmada, Krishna, Kaveri rivers with the legendary creation of Kerala by Parashurama, the sixth avatar of Vishnu. According to this legend, the region was created when Parashurama threw his axe into the sea Although it is known that the present-day region of Kerala was once governed by the Chera dynasty, little information exists regarding its early ethnography. Brahmin presence in the Tamil country is attested from the Sangam period onward.

There are lots of theories as to how Nambudiri Brahmins came to settle in Kerala, the commonly accepted point of view is that they moved in from North India via Tulu Nadu or Karnataka. Another theory based on the retention of Mahabharata types as memorized by different Brahmin communities points to a North Indian migration through Tamil Nadu as the base from which they migrated to Kerala via the Palakkad Gap, which is also the largest opening in the southern Western Ghats, and settled around the river Bharathappuzha. The region around Coimbatore near Karnataka- western Tamil Nadu border was ruled by the Cheras during Sangam period between 1st and the 4th centuries CE and it served as the eastern entrance to the Palakkad Gap, the principal trade route between the Malabar Coast and Tamil Nadu. The Azhvanchery Thamprakkal, who were the titular head of all Nambudiri Brahmins of Kerala, originally had right over parts of present-day Palakkad Taluk. Later they moved westwards along the River Bharathappuzha and settled around the river. Finally the Azhvanchery Thamprakkal bought Athavanad-Tirunavaya region in present-day Tirur Taluk and gave Palakkad to Palakkad Rajas (Tarur Swaroopam) who were originally from Athavanad region. Many of the oldest Nambudiri settlements of Kerala are situated around the River Bharathappuzha. The Kingdom of Tanur, Kingdom of Valluvanad, Perumpadappu Swaroopam, and the kingdom of Palakkad, located around the river Bharathappuzha, were once strongholds of Nambudiris. Although disputed, the widely held view is that Malayalam evolved from a west coast dialect of early Middle Tamil. Geographical separation due to Western ghats and migration of Nambudiris are largely thought to be responsible for the evolution of Malayalam language.The introduction of Grantha script which later got evolved into Malayalam script is also thought to be due to this migration.

Anthropologists Heike Moser and Paul Younger note that the Nambudiri Brahmin presence predates the 9th century, as attested by grants of land given to them by ruling families. According to the historian Romila Thapar, local kings and chiefs encouraged them to move to the area by offering such tax-exempt land grants in return for them officiating in Vedic rites that would legitimise the grantors' status as rulers. They also gained land and improved their influence over the socio-economic life of the region by helping rulers during the wars between the Chola and Chera dynasties when Vedic schools were turned into military academies.

Adi Shankara, one of the most revered Vedic scholars of Hinduism, was a Nambudiri ascetic who initiated the protocol of permitting only Nambudiris to lead as the Chief Priest at the Badrinath Temple, one of the holiest temples for Hindus. Furthermore, the spiritual leader of the Nambudiri Brahmins is given the title Azhvanchery Thamprakkal Samrāṭ, with the word "Samrāṭ" meaning "Emperor" in the Sanskrit language. Aside from holding rights over the sacred Guruvayur Temple, the presence and blessings of the Azhvanchery Thamprakkal was a ritual necessity during the coronation of the Zamorin, the Nair king of Kozhikode.

They have historically been distinguished by rare practices such as the adherence to Śrauta ritualism, the Pūrva-Mīmāṁsā school of Hindu philosophy and orthodox traditions, as well as many idiosyncratic customs that are unique among Brahmins, including primogeniture. Cyriac Pullapilly mentions that the dominating influence of the Nambudiris could be found in all matters related to Kerala, including religion, politics, society, economics and culture.

=== Early history ===
Operating from their illam houses, Nambudiris' ownership of agricultural land under the janmi system increased over many centuries and, according to Moser and Younger, they "established landholding temples and taught the people the rules of caste". The Nambudiris have been described to be responsible for the Sanskrit influence on Malayalam, a Dravidian language. Although disputed, the widely held view considers Malayalam to be originated from a west coast dialect of early middle tamil due to the Nambudiri Brahmin's mixing of Sanskrit and Western ghats separating the two lands.

Medieval Kerala has been characterised as an oligarchy which was dominated by the Nambudiris, who owned all the temples and their subsidiary villages. The Nambudiris had influence with the ruling class through the practice of sambandam, where younger Nambudiris used to have relationships with Kshatriya women or women from the upper sections of the Nair caste. The children of such unions were not considered Nambudiris, but a part of their matrilocal lineages. As a result of such unions, many kings and ruling chiefs in Kerala would be the offspring of Nambudiri fathers. These arrangements allowed the Nambudiris to gain political power in addition to religious and cultural dominance. In certain parts of Kerala, especially Edapally and Paravur, Nambudiri families gained the position of local kings. The descendants of the Parur Raja, a Nambudiri family still receive a pension from the government. There is an ongoing case as to the specifics of the amount being received.

The Nambudiri's grip on land was maintained through the practice of strict primogeniture and patrilineal inheritance. Despite their younger members having hypergamous relationships with Nairs, whose caste traditions were matrilineal, Nambudiri families remained aloof from general society. Although the historian E. K. Pillai has claimed that the Nambudiris from the 1100s enforced matrilineal polyandry on the previously patrilineal communities of the area, sociologist Randall Collins thinks it is unlikely that such a change could be imposed and says that "more probably it was the result of a process of marriage politics spread by emulation in the decentralised situation of status competition." Some other scholars believe that the matrilineal customs predate the period entirely and cite the queens of the Pandyan dynasty as evidence for this.

=== Modern history ===
The unwillingness of Nambudiris to adapt to changes in wider society persisted until the early years of the 20th century but Susan Bayly believes that their decline in significance can be traced to the period 1729-1748 when Marthanda Varma established the Kingdom of Travancore and chose to use Iyer and Deshastha Brahmins from Tamil Nadu in his civil service. She believes that decision undermined the relationship between the Nambudiri Brahmins and royalty in the region, although others have said that Varma's influence was short-lived and that the main cause of change was the influence of British diplomats who worked with the Travancore Maharaja in the 19th century. After the passing of the Charter Acts of 1833 and 1853 in the British Parliament, the British encouraged the work of Christian missionaries, notably in provision of education, and began the introduction of a judicial system that would have a significant impact on the landholdings, inheritance customs and marriage arrangements of both the Nambudiris and Nairs. The traditional basis of life was challenged by these and other changes, affecting also the other major ethnic groups of the area, such as the Ezhavas. Like others, the desire for social reform went strong among the Nambudiris which led to the formation of the Yogakshema movement in 1908 in order to agitate for the marriage of all the junior males within the community itself. It also focused on popularising the English language study and abolishing the Purdah system among the Nambudiri females.

== Demographics ==
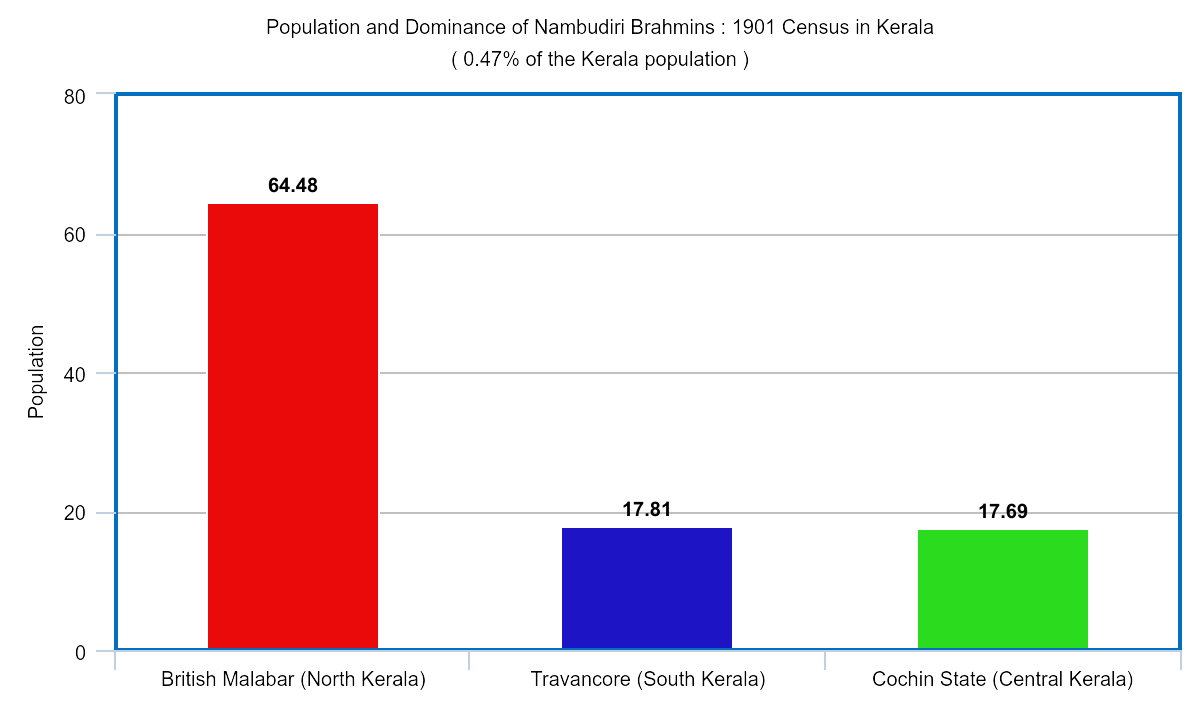
Population and Dominance of Nambudiri Brahmins in Kerala based on 1901 census reports

The Nambudhiri Brahmins are a super-minority community in Kerala. According to the 1901 Census reports, they represent 0.47% of the total population of Nambudiris within Kerala. They are dominant and highly influential in British Malabar, where they account for more than 66% of the total population of Nambudiris in Kerala. Most of them reside in the Palakkad and Kozhikode districts of South Malabar and the Kannur district of North Malabar. A small Population is also found in Cochin and Travancore Kingdom.

== Religious customs ==
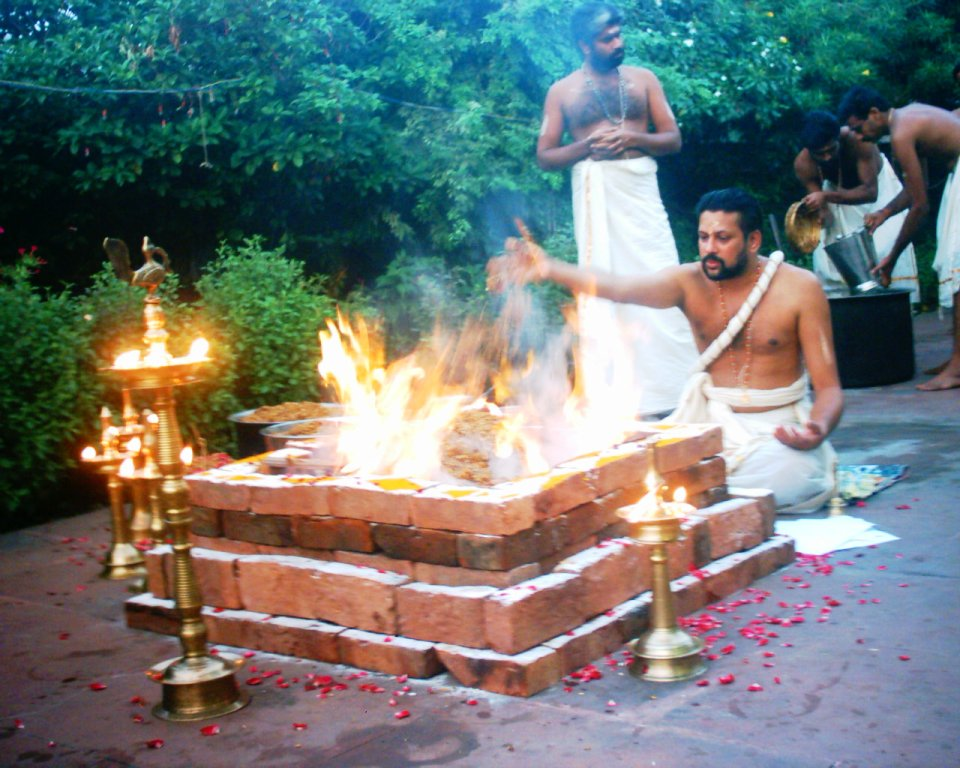
Nambūdiri Brahmin performing śrauta rites

=== Tantram ===
Kerala’s traditional Tantric temple system developed around hereditary ritual adhikāra (authority), rather than Brahmin status alone. The Thantris were drawn principally from designated Namboothiri Brahmin lineages, whose members underwent the required dīkṣā and training in Tantra, mantra, pratiṣṭhā and texts such as the Tantrasamuccaya. Embranthiris—Brahmins originating from the Kannada/Tulu regions of neighbouring Karnataka—also became an important priestly community in Kerala, serving as Santhis and in established temple traditions alongside Namboothiris. Historically, many temples maintained strict hereditary and ritual prohibitions on persons outside the authorised priestly lineages performing particular rites; consequently the prohibitions extended to the Tamil Brahmins. Tamil Brahmins were excluded from Thantriship and from priestly offices in temples whose customary ācāra reserved them for Namboothiri or Embranthiri traditions. This was not a universal prohibition against Tamil Brahmins as an ethnic community: Tamil Brahmin and other priestly traditions had their own adhikāra, particularly within Śaiva Āgamic, Vaikhānasa and Pāñcarātra systems. The Kerala Thantri’s distinctive responsibility was the prāṇa-pratiṣṭhā and āvāhana of the deity and the establishment and preservation of its chaitanya (divine presence or sacred potency) through mantra, homa, nyāsa, kalaśa and related Tantric rites; the Thantri therefore functioned not simply as a pūjāri but as the initiated ritual authority responsible for the sanctity and continuity of the temple’s consecrated order.

=== Vedic learning ===
The following Vedic recensions are attested among them.

1. Rigveda, the Śākala recension which is the only extant recension of the Rigveda across India. The Nambudiris follow both the Āśvalāyana and Śāṅkhāyana Śrauta Sūtras. The latter, called the Kauṣītaki tradition among Nambudiris is restricted to them. The Kauṣītakis are believed to have belonged to the Bāṣkala recension of the Rigveda, but that recension has become extinct among the Nambudiris.
2. Yajurveda, the Taittirīya śākhā with the Baudhāyana Śrauta and Gṛhya Sutras, Vādhūla Śrauta and Gṛhya Sutras, and Āgniveśya Gṛhya Sutra
3. Samaveda in the Jaiminīya recension, which is elsewhere found only among the Śōḻiya Brahmans, from whom the ancestral Nambudiri population split.

=== Agnicayana ===
The ancient Vedic ritual of Agnicayana (the altar of fire), which spans a 12-day period and which Frits Staal and Robert Gardner claim to be one of the oldest known rituals, was maintained by Nambudiri Brahmins until at least 1975. Although it may have largely died out elsewhere in India and thus be symptomatic of the community's resistance to change, David Knipe notes that it is still performed regularly in Andhra Pradesh and has been for centuries.

== Domestic culture ==
=== Attire ===
Traditionally, they wore a simple cloth around the waist called a thorthu (or thortumundu), in domestic settings. When they had to travel, they wore two sets of cloth in addition known as a vasthram.

Nambudiris wore their traditional hair tufts (kuṭumi or śikhā) on the front like the Dikshitars of Tamil Nadu.

=== Marriage customs ===
Nambudiri Brahmin families practised a more strict version of primogeniture than Brahmin communities elsewhere in India. Under this custom, only the eldest son could marry a Nambudiri woman and thus produce an heir to the family property. Younger sons were restricted to sambandam relationships with non-Brahmin women, whom the Nambudiris considered to be concubines and whose offspring could not inherit. This tradition limited the extent of marriage within their own caste and led to the practice of hypergamy with the Nair community. Kathleen Gough notes that:

These hypergamous unions were regarded by Brahmans as socially acceptable concubinage, for the union was not initiated with Vedic rites, the children were not legitimized as Brahmans, and neither the woman nor her child was accorded the rights of kin. By the matrilineal castes, however, the same unions were regarded as marriage, for they fulfilled the conditions of ordinary Nayar marriage and served to legitimize the child as an acceptable member of his matrilineal lineage and caste."

The disparity in caste ranking in a relationship between a Brahmin man and a Nair woman meant that the woman was unable to live with her husband(s) in the Brahmin family and so remained in her own family. The children resulting from such marriages always became Nairs. K. M. Panikkar argues that it is this type of relationship that resulted in the matrilineal and matrilocal system. It has also been argued that the practice, along with judicious selection of the man who tied the thali, formed a part of the Nair aspirational culture whereby they would seek to improve their status within the caste. Furthermore, that:

... among the higher-ranking Nayars (and Kshatriyas and Samantans) in contradistinction to the "commoner" Nayars, no two subdivisions admitted to equal status. Thus the relations set up by the tali-rite [ie: the thalikettu kalyanam] and the sambandham union were always hypergamous.

Although it is certain that in theory hypergamy can cause a shortage of marriageable women in the lowest ranks of a caste and promote upwards social movement from the lower Nair subdivisions, the numbers involved would have been very small. It was not a common practice outside the higher subcaste groups and the Nambudiris had mostly stopped the practice by the 1920s.

=== Koodiyattam (artform) ===
The form of Sanskrit theatre known as Koodiyattam, which is native to Kerala, was traditionally patronised by Nambudiris.

== Notable people ==
- Adi Shankara, Indian philosopher.
- Madhava of Sangamagrama, Medieval Indian Mathematician who founded the Kerala school of astronomy and mathematics
- Nilakantha Somayaji, Mathematician and Astronomer
- Melpathur Narayana Bhattathiri, Logician, Poet and Mathematician who composed the devotional treatise Narayaneeyam
- Chennas Narayanan Namboodiripad, Vedic ritualist who authored the Tantra Samucchaya
- Rahul Easwar, Indian public policy commentator.
- Namboothiri, Indian painter and sculptor.
- Akkitham Achuthan Namboothiri, Indian writer.
- Babu Namboothiri, Indian actor
- M. K. Sankaran Namboothiri, Musical artist
- Unnikrishnan Namboothiri, Indian actor.
- Akkitham Narayanan, Indian painter.

== See also ==
- Pushpaka Brahmin
- Tuluva Brahmin
- Smarthavicharam
