= Nair =

Caste group in India

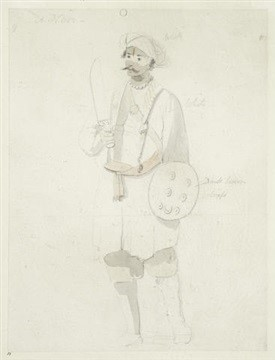
- A Nair by Thomas Daniell. Drawn in pencil and watercolor sometime between the 17th and 18th century.

Regions with significant populations
- Kerala

Languages
- Malayalam, Sanskrit

Religion
- Hinduism

The Nair (/ˈnaɪər/, Malayalam: [n̪aːjɐr]), also known as Nayar, are a group of Indian Hindu castes, described by anthropologist Kathleen Gough as "not a unitary group but a named category of castes". The Nair include several castes and many subdivisions, not all of whom historically bore the name 'Nair'. These people lived, and many continue to live, in the area which is now the Indian state of Kerala. Their internal caste behaviours and systems are markedly different between the people in the northern and southern sections of the area, although there is not very much reliable information on those inhabiting the north.

Historically, Nairs lived in large family units called tharavads that housed descendants of one common female ancestor. These family units along with their unusual marriage customs, which are no longer practiced, have been much studied. Although the detail varied from one region to the next, the main points of interest to researchers of Nair marriage customs were the existence of two particular rituals—the pre-pubertal thalikettu kalyanam and the later sambandam—and the practice of polygamy in some areas. Some Nair women also practiced hypergamy with Nambudiri Brahmins from the Malabar region.

The Nair were historically involved in military conflicts in the region. Following hostilities between the Nair and the British in 1809, the British limited Nair participation in the Indian Army. After India's independence, the Nair Brigade of the Travancore State Force was merged into the Indian Army and became a part of the 9th Battalion, Madras Regiment, the oldest battalion in the Indian Army.

The serpent is worshipped by Nair families as a guardian of the clan. The worship of snakes, a Dravidian custom, is so prevalent in the area that one anthropologist notes: "In no part of the world is snake worship more general than in Kerala." Serpent groves were found in the southwestern corner of nearly every Nair compound.

== Etymology ==
The origin of the Nair is disputed. Some people think the name itself is derived from nayaka, an honorific meaning "leader of the people", while others believe it stems from the community's association with the Naga cult of serpent worship.

== History ==
=== Early period ===
Christopher Fuller, an anthropologist, has said that it is likely that the first reference to the Nair community was made by Pliny the Elder in his Natural History, dating from 77 AD. That work describes what is probably the Malabar coast area wherein could be found the "Nareae, who are shut in by the Capitalis range, the highest of all the mountains in India". Fuller believes it probable that the Nareae referred to the Nairs and the Capitalis range is the Western Ghats.

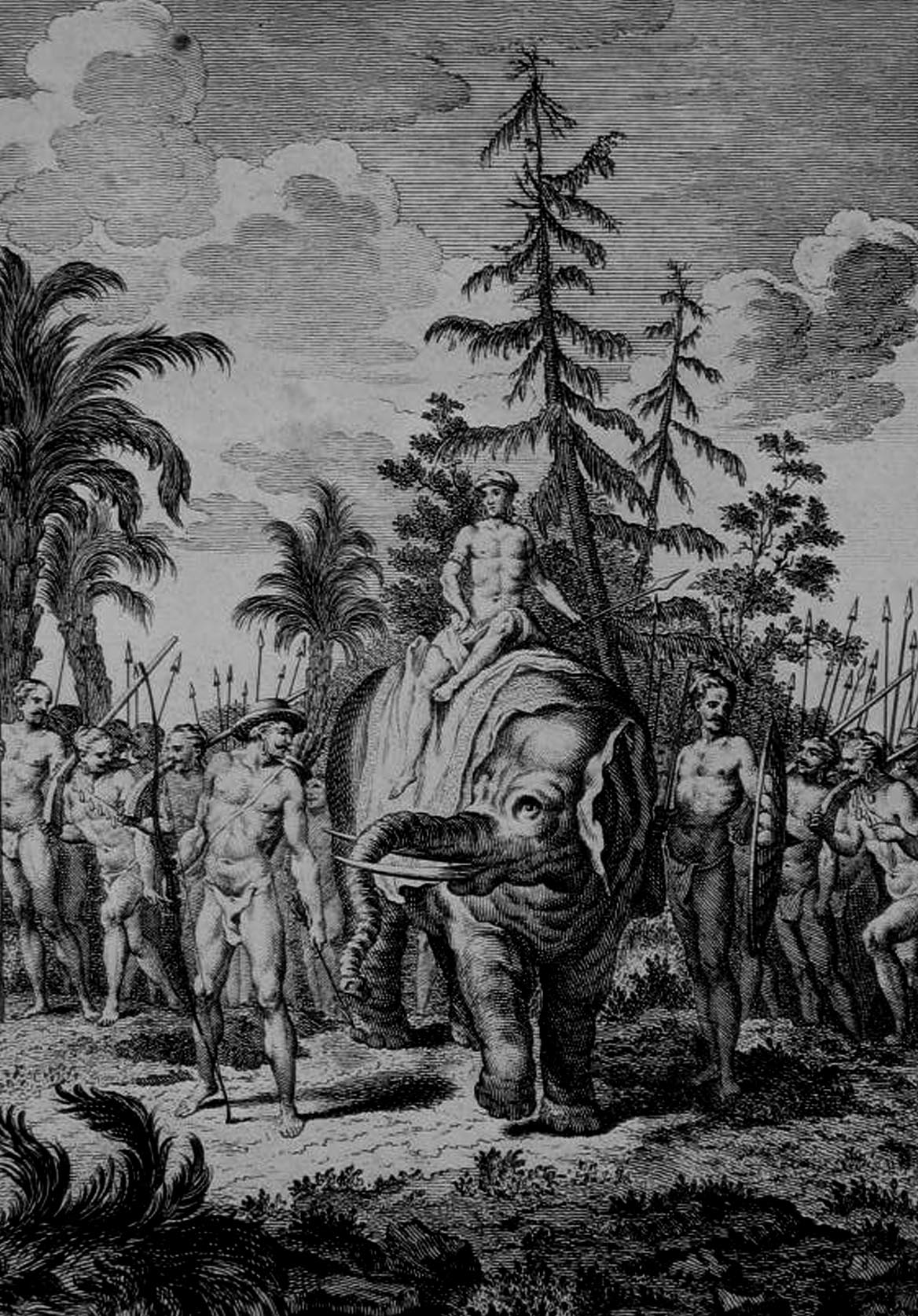
Nair soldiers attending the King of Cochin: A 16th century European portrait. The majority of Nair men were trained in arms, and the traditional role of the Nairs was to fight in the continuous wars which characterized Kerala history.

There are large gaps in the known early history of the Kerala region, which in the 1st-century AD is thought to have been governed by the Chera dynasty and which by the late 3rd-century AD had broken up, possibly as a consequence of a decline in trade with the Romans. There is no evidence of Nairs in the area during this period. Inscriptions on copper-plate regarding grants of land and rights to settlements of Jewish and Christian traders, dated approximately between the 7th- and 9th-centuries AD, refer to Nair chiefs and soldiers from the Eranad, Valluvanad, Venad (later known as Travancore) and Palghat areas. As these inscriptions show the Nairs as witnesses to the agreements between those traders and the successors to the Cheras, the Perumals, it is probable that by this time the Nairs were vassal chieftains.

Certainly by the 13th century, some Nairs were the rulers of small kingdoms and the Perumals had disappeared. Trade with China, which had declined for some time, began to increase once more in the 13th century and it was during this period that two small Nair kingdoms were established. Both of these—at Kolattunad and at Venad—contained major seaports, and they expanded by taking over the inland territory of neighbouring chieftains. Although trade with China once more went into decline in the 14th-century, it was replaced by trade with Muslim Arabs. These traders had been visiting the area for several hundred years but their activities increased to the point that a third Nair kingdom, based on the port of Calicut, became established. There were also small kingdoms at Walluvanad and Palghat, away from the coastline. This period was characterized by continuous war between these various kingdoms, and most able bodied Nair men were assigned to fight in these wars.

The large influx of travelers and traders to Kerala had left many early accounts of the Nairs. These descriptions were initially idealized by Europeans for its martial society, productivity, spirituality, and for its marriage practices. Some early examples of these works being John Mandeville's Travels (1356), William Caxton's 'The mirrour of the wourld' (1481), and Jean Boudin's 'Les sex livres de la republique' (1576). The Nair men are described as being polite and well-mannered in old sources, and nearly all historical descriptions describe them as arrogant. Sources on Nair women are scant and were written by men, and these primarily comment on their beauty. The martial society of the Nairs was something that was covered by nearly all visitors, and their characteristic of always being armed is well described.

The Portuguese arrived in the area from 1498, by which time the Zamorin (King) of Calicut had come to the fore. Arab traders had firmly established themselves at his port and although trade still went to the ports of the other two small kingdoms, it was in relatively small amounts. Indeed, the kingdom based at Kolathunad had split into three even smaller kingdoms; and the ruler of Venad had conceded considerable powers to local chiefs within his kingdom. By the time of European arrival, the title Nair was used to refer to all military castes. The Portuguese used the term Nair for all soldiers, and prior to 1498 the military or retainer Nairs are believed to have been called 'Lokar'. Gough states that the title Nair existed prior to that time referring to only those families that were involved in the military. (Note: Gough quotes Ayyar (1938) for the statement on Lokar) The Portuguese had many involvements in South India, including their support of the Paravars in a trade battle over control of the pearl fisheries of Malabar, but in the Nair kingdoms, their principal interest was to obtain control of the trade in pepper. In this they followed the Muslim Arabs, whom they eventually marginalised; and they were in turn followed by the Dutch in 1683. The British and French were also active in the region now known as Kerala, the former from 1615 and the latter from 1725. These various European powers combined with one or another of the Nair rulers, fighting for control. One notable alliance was that of the Portuguese with the Kingdom of Cochin, with whom they sided in order to work against the power of the Zamorins of Calicut. Although Calicut remained the most significant of the kingdoms until the 1730s, its power was eroded and the rulers of Cochin were freed from being vassals of the Zamorins.

=== Decline of dominance ===
In 1729, Marthanda Varma became the Raja of Venad and inherited a state facing war and refractory Nair chiefs. Varma curtailed the power of the Nair chiefs and introduced Tamil Brahmins to form a core component of his administration. Under Marthanda Varma's reign, the Travancore Nair Infantry (also known as the Nair Pattalam) distinguished themselves in battle against the Dutch at the Battle of Colachel (1741). The Nair army was re-organized in the European style and had transformed from a feudal-based force into a standing army. Though this army was still made up of Nairs, this had checked the power of local chiefs and was the first limit on Nair dominance.

There had been Hindu–Muslim clashes during the medieval period, notably when Muslim armies from Mysore invaded and gained control of northern Kerala in 1766. The Nairs of Kottayam and Kadathanad led the resistance, and the Nairs managed to defeat all Mysorean garrisons except for those in Palakkad. Shortly afterwards, Haider Ali died and his son Tipu had become Sultan. The Nairs of Calicut and South Malabar had recaptured Calicut and defeated an army sent by Tipu to break the siege. This had caused the Sultan himself to intervene in 1789 during which many Hindus, especially Nairs, were kept captive or killed by Muslims under Tipu Sultan. Many Nairs had fled to the protection of Travancore, while others engaged in guerilla warfare. However the Nairs of Travancore were able to defeat the Muslim forces in 1792 at the Third Anglo-Mysore War. After this, the East India Company established its pre-eminence throughout the entire Kerala region.

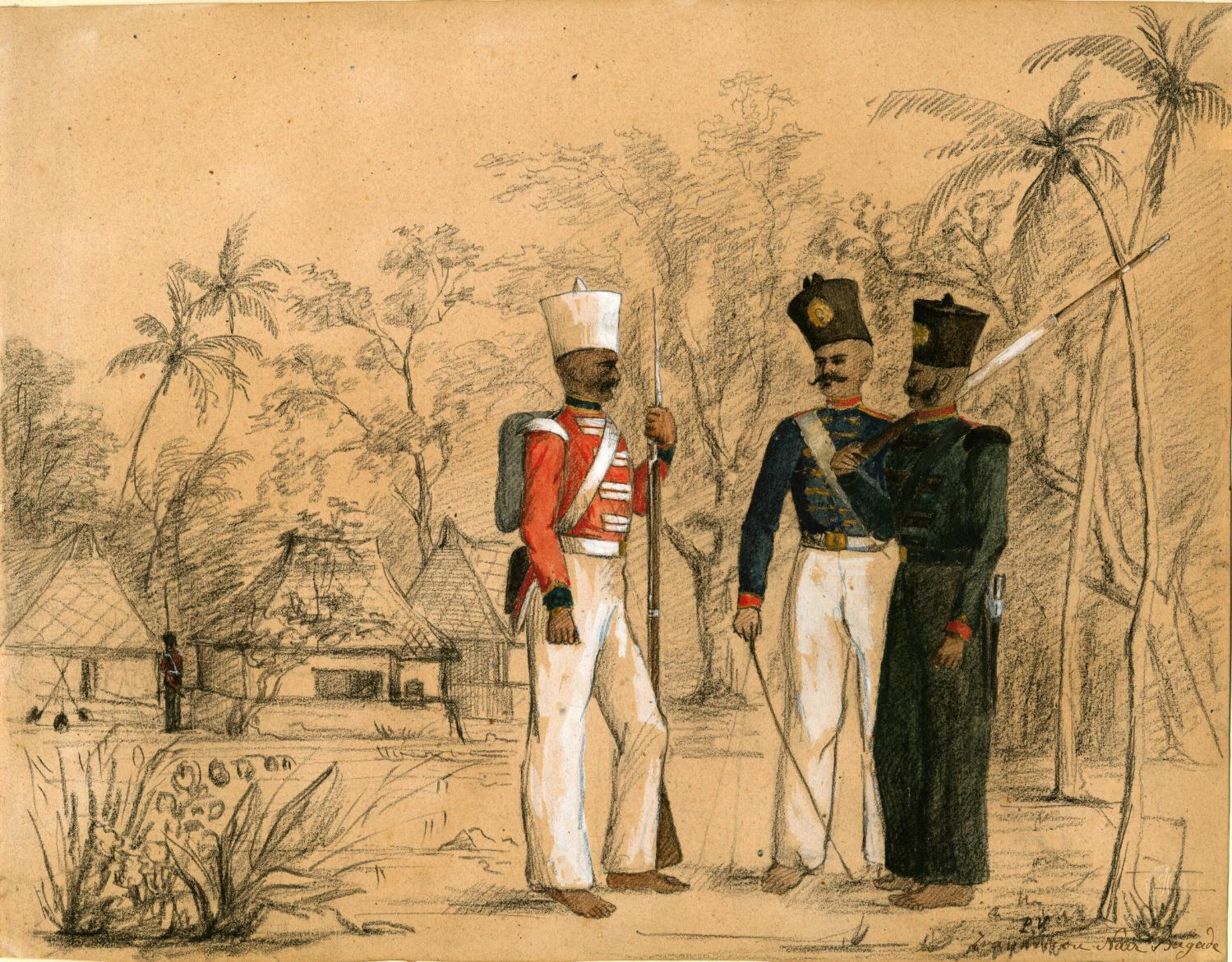
Members of the Travancore Nair Brigade, drawn in 1855. The Nair brigade was the remnant of the Travancore Nair army after the takeover of the British.

The British imposed the next limitation on Nair dominance. After signing the treaty of subsidiary alliance with Travancore in 1795, British residents were sent to the Travancore administration; the interference from the British had caused two rebellions in 1804 and 1809, the latter of which was to have lasting repercussions. Velu Thampi, the Nair dewan of Travancore, led a revolt in 1809 to remove British influence from the Travancore sarkar. After a few months, the rebellion was defeated and Velu Thampi had committed suicide. Afterwards, the Nairs were disbanded and disarmed. Up to this time the Nairs had been historically a military community, who along with the Nambudiri Brahmins owned most of the land in the region; after it, they turned increasingly to administrative service. By this time there were nine small Nair kingdoms and several chiefdoms which were loosely affiliated to them; the British amalgamated seven of those kingdoms (Calicut, Kadattunad, Kolattunad, Kottayam, Kurumbranad, Palghat and Walluvanad) to form Malabar District, while Cochin and Travancore were left as native states under the control of their own rulers but with advice from the British. Velu Thampi's rebellion had made the British wary of Nair leaders, and the Travancore sarkar was mainly under control of British residents although the rest of the administration had been handled for the most part by non-Malayali Brahmins and Nairs.

The Travancore army became the Travancore Nair Brigade in 1818–1819. The Nair unit, 1st Battalion of HH Rani's Troops, was likewise incorporated into this brigade, but the Brigade served only in a police capacity until the withdrawal of the East India Company troops in 1836. In 1901, the unit was relieved of its police duties and placed under a British officer. In 1935, the Travancore Nair Regiment and the Maharaja's bodyguard were fused and renamed the Travancore State Force, as part of the Indian State Forces system.

The changes in the economy and the legal system from the late 1800s had ruined many Nair tharavads. Nair leaders noted the decay of their community and struggled to deal with issues regarding widespread infighting, disunity, and feuds. This was in contrast with other communities who were quick to unite for caste interests. By 1908, the Nairs had not completely lost their dominance; they still held the most land, and had still held a majority of the government posts despite competition from low-castes and Christians. The dominance that Nairs historically held from their ritual status had come under opposition. The land that the Nairs historically had held was gradually lost, for there was a massive rate of wealth transfer to Christians and avarna Hindus. Christian missionaries also found interest in the dissolution of the tharavads as they saw this as an opportunity to convert the Nairs.

In 1914, the Nair Service Society (NSS) was founded by Mannathu Padmanabha Pillai. Growing up in poverty and witnessing widespread domestic disarray and land alienation amongst the Nairs had facilitated Padmanabhan to create the NSS. The organization aimed to respond to these issues by creating educational institutions, welfare programs, and to replace cumbersome customs such as the matrilineal system.

Subsequent to Indian independence from British rule, the regions of Travancore, Malabar District and Cochin became the present-day state of Kerala. It is with regard to the Nairs living in the former areas of Cochin and South Malabar, which are sometimes jointly referred to as Central Kerala, that there is the most information; that available for North Malabar is the most scant. Two former Travancore State Army divisions, the 1st Travancore Nayar Infantry and the 2nd Travancore Nayar Infantry were converted into 9th and 16th Battalions of Madras Regiment respectively after the independence. The Nayar Army from Cochin was incorporated into the 17th Battalion.

== Culture ==
=== Arts ===
Historically most Nairs were literate in Malayalam, and many in Sanskrit. The explanation for this literacy was attributed to the general needs of administration, as many Nairs served as scribes and bailiffs for the royal courts. Many Nairs had become prominent philosophers and poets, and from the 16th century and onwards, the Nairs contributed increasingly to literature and drama. Nairs from the lowest subsections of the community had also partaken in these artistic traditions. By the 19th century, novels written by Nairs had dealt with themes of social change. These themes would primarily relate to the rise of the nuclear family in replacement of the old matrilineal system. Novels such as, for example, Indulekha by O.C Menon had themes which dealt with societal constraints on romantic love, while C.V Raman Pillai's Marthanda Varma had dealt with themes relating to the Nair military past.

Kathakali is a dance-drama which portrays scenes from Sanskrit epics or stories. The dance drama was historically performed exclusively by Nairs and had always traditionally been associated with them; Nair rulers and chiefs had patronized the art, the first Ramanattam plays were written by a Nair from a ruling family, and Kathakali had foundations in Nair military training and religious customs. The first Kathakali actors were most likely Nair soldiers who performed the dance-drama part-time, influenced by the techniques of Kalaripayattu. As Kathakali developed as an art form, the need for specialization and detail grew. Those who had become masters of the art would pass their traditions on to their families. These families were the source of the next generations of Kathakali students, and it was often the nephew of the master that would be chosen as the disciple.

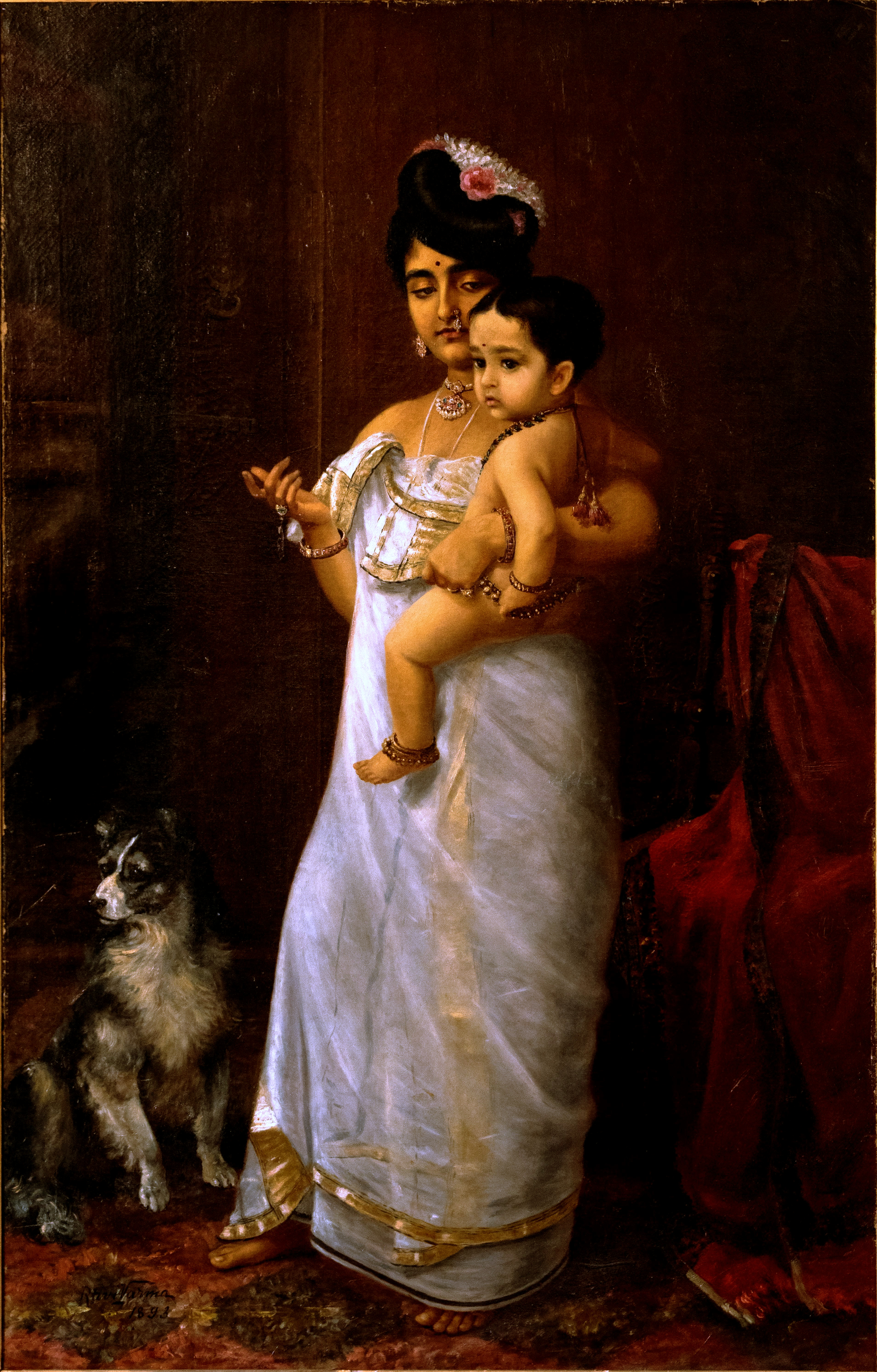
There Comes Papa (1893) by Raja Ravi Varma depicts a Nair woman in the traditional mundum neryathum. The painting has also been noted by several critics due its symbolism of the decline of Nair matrilinity.

=== Attire ===
The historical attire of the Nair men was the mundu, a cloth wrapped around the waist and then left to hang down nearly to the ground, rather than tucked in as in other parts of India. The low-hanging fabric was considered as specific to the Nair caste, and at the start of the 20th century it was noted that in more conservative rural areas a non-Nair could be beaten for daring to wear a cloth hanging low to the ground. Wealthy Nairs might use silk for this purpose, and they also would cover their upper body with a piece of laced muslin; the remainder of the community used once to wear a material manufactured in Eraniyal but by the time of Panikkar's writing were generally using cotton cloth imported from Lancashire, England, and wore nothing above the waist. Nair men eschewed turbans or other head coverings, but would carry an umbrella against the sun's rays. They also eschewed footwear, although some of the wealthy would wear elaborate sandals.

The historical dress of the Nair woman was the mundu, as well as a cloth that covered the upper body. The mundum neryathum, a garment that roughly resembles the sari, had later become the traditional dress of the Nair women. The dress consisted of a cloth tied around the waist as well as a cloth covering the breast, and worn without a blouse. The mundum neryathum had become the essence for the set sari, which is considered to be Kerala's specific regional wear. Sonja Thomas describes how this is an example of how "primacy was given to upper caste cultural norms". The Nair women would also wear onera (onnara), a loincloth worn as an undergarment by more conservative women. The undergarment was noted as beautifying and slimming the waist.

=== Religion and ritual ===
The primary deity of the Nairs is Bhagavati, who is the patron goddess of war and fertility. Central to all aspects of Nair life and revered as a kind and ferocious virgin mother, Bhagavati identifies with both Sanskritic and regional based aspects of worship. The goddess was worshipped in the temples of the royal Nair matrilineages and also the village Nair matrilineages. The idol would either be placed in the western side of the house or be placed in a room with other deities. The kalaris would also have an area for the worship of Kali, the warlike manifestation of Bhagavati.

Serpent deities known as Nāga were revered by the Nairs, and these deities would be placed in a grove in the family property. The groves would portray a miniature forest made to resemble Patala, and could feature various types of idols. Naga worship was significant to the entire tharavad since, as Gough says, they "... could inflict or avert sickness in general but were especially believed to be responsible for the fertility or barrenness of tharavad women". Gough speculates that the Nagas were seen as phallic symbols representing the procreative powers of the ancestors.

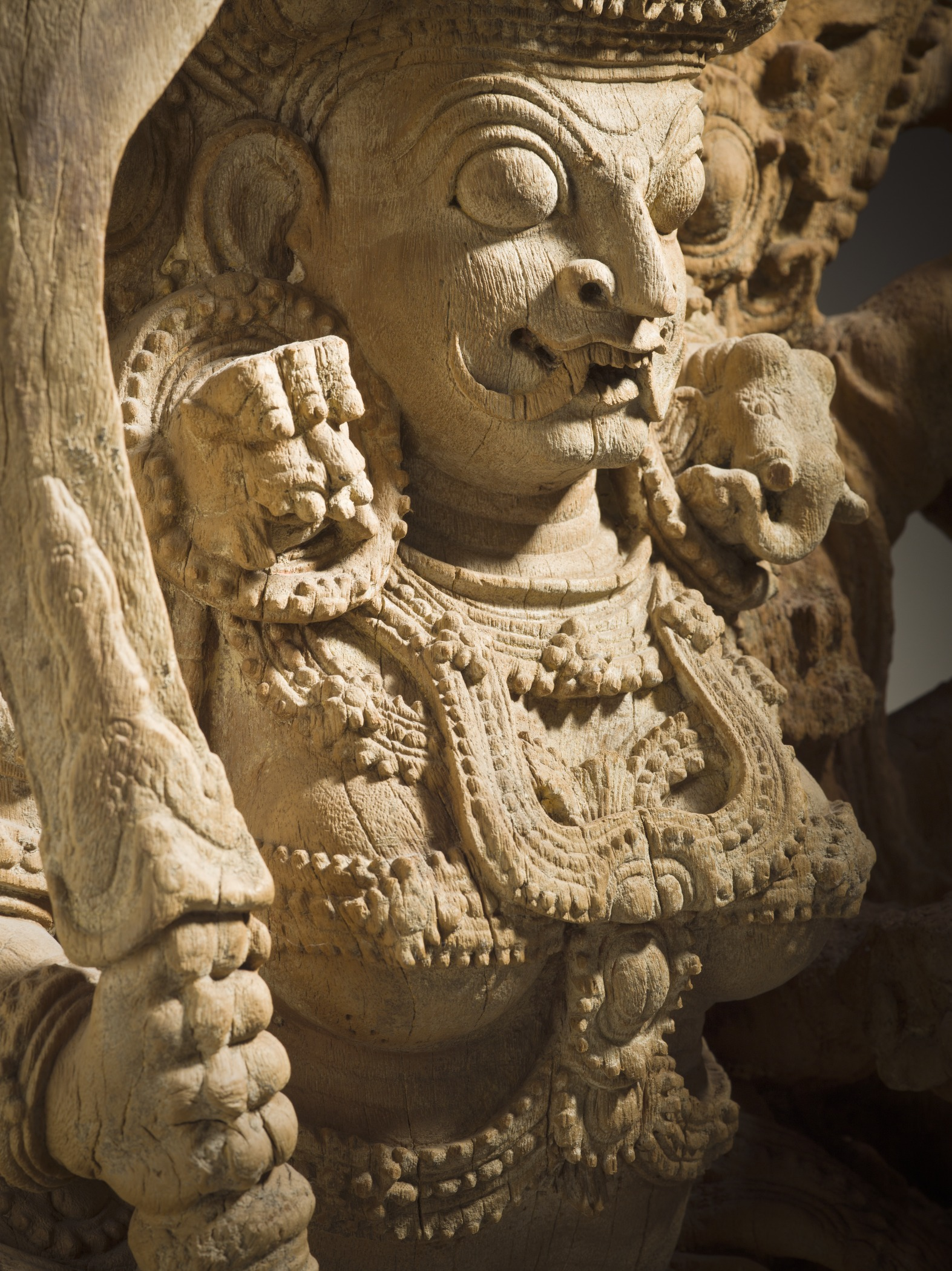
17th century wooden idol of Kali from Kerala. Kali is the warlike manifestation of Bhagavati, the patron deity of the Nairs.

Nairs believed in spirits, which on some occasions they attempted to tame by performing various rituals. According to Panikkar, they believed in spirits such as Pretam, Bhutam and Pisachu. Pretam is the spirit of prematurely dead people; Bhutam, Panikkar says, "is seen generally in marshy districts and does not always hurt people unless they go very near him"; and Pisachu is a spirit of bad air causing illnesses. Believing Pretam to be wandering around the place of death, they warned people to stay away from those areas between 9 am and 3 pm. They also believed in a comic elf called Kuttichattan who would be prone to mischief. They believed in evil eye—that compliments from others had a negative effect; they also believed that utterances of a person with kari nakku (black-tongue) had a similarly bad effect. They also believed kothi from a poor man watching someone eating a delicious food will cause stomach-aches and dysentery.

==== Birth and death rituals ====
The Nair traditionally practised certain rituals relating to births, although often only for those of the first-born. Of these, pulicudi was the most significant to them. This involved rubbing coconut oil onto the pregnant woman, followed by bathing, formal dressing, consultation with an astrologer regarding the expected date of birth and a ceremonial drinking of tamarind juice, dripped along the blade of a sword. The woman would also select a grain, from which it was believed possible to determine the gender of the child. This ritual was performed in front of the community and contained many symbolic references; for example, the use of the sword was believed to make the child a warrior.

In the months subsequent to the birth there followed other rituals, including those of purification and the adornment of the child with a symbolic belt to ward off illness, as well as a name-giving ceremony at which an astrologer again played a significant role. There were also various dietary restrictions, both for the woman during pregnancy and for the child in the first few months of its life.

Although birth was considered to be ritually polluting, a death in the family was thought to be much more so. In the case of the death of the oldest member of the family, whether male or female, the body would be cremated on a pyre; for all other family members, burial was the norm. In either case, the ceremonies were conducted by the Maran subgroup of the community and they utilised both elements of superstition and of Hinduism. The occasions involving cremation were more ritualised than those involving burial.

An elaborate fourteen-day period of mourning followed the cremation, during which the family performed various symbolic acts around the pyre and were regarded to be highly polluted in ritual terms, thus necessitating not only that they took regular baths, but also that any other Nair who might touch them must also take a bath. The period was followed by a feast and by participation in sports events, which also involved Nairs from nearby villages. Subsequently, the family stayed in mourning while one male member undertook a diksha, during which time he had to maintain a pure life. This involved him living with a Brahmin, bathing twice daily and desisting from cutting either his hair or his fingernails, as well as being prevented from speaking with or indeed even seeing women. In some cases, the diksha might last for a year rather than the more usual forty-one days, in which case there would be considerable celebration at its end.

=== Diet ===
Pork was noted as a favourite food of the Nair, and even high-status Nairs were noted as eating buffalo meat.

The Nair avoided beef, and many did not eat lamb. In the modern day, alcohol is a component of Nair-dominated festivals in Kerala.

== Social and political organisation ==
=== Political organization ===
Prior to the reorganisation of the region by the British, Kerala was divided into around ten feudal states. Each of these was governed by a rajah (king) and was subdivided into organisational units known as nadus. In turn, the nadus were divided into dēsams.

The person who governed the nadu was known as the naduvazhi. It was an inherited role, originally bestowed by a king, and of a lower ritual rank than the royal lineages. Although Nair families, they generally used the title of Samantan and were treated as vassals. However, some naduvazhi were feudatory chiefs, former kings whose territory had been taken over by, for example, the Zamorins of Calicut. In these instances, although they were obeisant to the rajah, they held a higher ritual rank than the Zamorin as a consequence of their longer history of government; they also had more power than the vassal chiefs. The naduvazhi families each saw themselves as a distinct caste in the same manner as did the rajahs; they did not recognise other naduvazhi families as being equal to them. The naduvazhi maintained criminal and civil order and could demand military service from all Nairs below him. There was usually a permanent force of between 500 and 1000 men available and these were called upon by the rajah when required. All fighting was usually suspended during the monsoon period of May to September, when movement around the country was almost impossible. Roads did not exist, nor wheeled vehicles or pack animals, until after 1766.

The desavazhi had the right to operate kalaris, which were military training schools that all young Nair men from the age of 12 were expected to attend. They ceased attending at the age of 18 but were expected to be available for military duty at a day's notice. The function of these schools became less significant practically, following the introduction of the Arms Act by the British, which limited the right of Nairs to carry arms; however, they continued to exist and provided some training to those Nair men who did not attend English schools. This training became evident at village festivals, during which a martial review would take place.

According to Gough, the villages were generally between one and four square miles in area and their lands were usually owned by one landlord family, who claimed a higher ritual rank than its other inhabitants. The landlord was also usually the desavazhi (headman) and in all cases, their families were known as jenmis. These landlords were from the lineages of the royal families or feudatory chiefs; or were patrilineal Nambudiri families or the estates of temples operated by groups of those families. They were also from the lineages of the matrilineal vassal Samantan chiefs and, finally, the lowest jenmis in terms of ritual ranking were Nairs who had inherited from matrilineal ancestors to whom land and the concomitant headmanship had been granted by a king. In all cases, the landholdings could not be sold without royal permission.

The villages were historically mostly self-sufficient, with craft trades such as pottery and metalwork present in each of them. This meant that there was little need for close central control by the higher levels in the organisational hierarchy, and it also meant that trade between villages was minimal. Such traders as did exist were mostly concentrated in the port towns and consisted of immigrant Syrians, Muslims, Christians and Jews, with Hindu traders later arriving from other parts of India, as well as the Europeans. The Nairs were the sole members of the village organisations, which existed for such purposes as managing the affairs of the temples and, at one time, organising military training and deployment. A Nair family was considered to be part of the village organisation even if they had moved away from it. There were other castes in these villages, and other religious groups also, but they were excluded from the organisations. This arrangement was different from that found elsewhere in India, and another difference was that each house, whether for Nairs or otherwise, was usually in its own compound. There was no communal land, as existed elsewhere, and no communal plan for the village layout.

Nairs were not permitted to perform rites in the temples of the sanketams, the villages where the land was owned by a group of Nambudiri families, although they might have access to the outer courtyard area. Sometimes there were no Nairs at all in these villages. In villages where temples existed which were privately owned by a single Nambudiri family, there would be another temple, dedicated to Bhagavati, that was used by the Nairs. It was in villages where the Nairs included the headman that there might be just a single temple, run by their village organisation.

=== Social organization ===
By the late 19th century, the caste system of Kerala had evolved to be the most complex to be found anywhere in India. There were over 500 groups represented in an elaborate structure of relationships and the concept of ritual pollution extended not merely to untouchability but even further, to unapproachability. The system was gradually reformed to some degree, with one of those reformers, Swami Vivekananda, having observed that it represented a "mad house" of castes. The usual four-tier Hindu caste system, involving the varnas of Brahmin (priest), Kshatriya (warrior), Vaishya (business person, involved in trading, entrepreneurship and finance) and Shudra (service person), did not exist. Kshatriyas were rare and the Vaishyas were not present at all. The roles left empty by the absence of these two ritual ranks were taken to some extent by a few Nairs and by non-Hindu immigrants, respectively.

The Nambudiri Brahmins were at the top of the ritual caste hierarchy and in that system outranked even the kings. They regarded all Nairs as Shudra. Below the Nambudiris came the Tamil Brahmins and other later immigrants of the Brahmin varna. Beyond this, the precise ranking is subject to some difference in opinion. Kodoth has placed the Samantan caste below the Kshatriya rank but above the Nairs, but Gough considers that the Pushpakans and Chakyars, both of which were the highest ranked in the group of temple servants known as Ambalavasis, were ranked between the Brahmins and the Nairs, as were several other members of the Ambalavasi group. She also believes that some Nairs adopted the title of Samantan in order to emphasise their superiority over others in their caste. The unwillingness of the higher varnas to engage in what they considered to be the polluting activities of industrial and commercial activity has been cited as a reason for the region's relatively limited economic development.

Keralite traditions included that certain communities were not allowed within a given distance of other castes on the grounds that they would "pollute" the relatively higher-ranked group. For example, Dalits were prohibited within 64 feet. Likewise, a Nair could approach but not touch a Nambudiri.

==== Subgroups ====
The Nairs identify themselves as being in many subgroups and there has been debate regarding whether these groups should be considered as subcastes or a mixture both of those and of subdivisions. There have been several attempts to identify these various groups; most of these were prior to the end of British governance in India but Kathleen Gough also studied the issue in 1961. These analyses bear similarities to the Jatinirnayam, a Malayalam work that enumerated 18 main subgroups according to occupation, including drummers, traders, coppersmiths, palanquin bearers, servants, potters and barbers, as well as ranks such as the Kiriyam and Illam. Although the Jatinirnayam did not itself distinguish any particular subgroups as ranking higher, subsequent attempts at classification did do so, claiming the various occupations to be traditional ones and stating that only the higher ranked groups were soldiers. Anthropologists, ethnologists and other authors believe that the last name of a Nair was a title which denoted the subgroup (vibhagam) to which that person belonged and indicated the occupation the person pursued or was bestowed on them by a chief or king. These names included Nair itself, Kurup, Menon, and Pillai.

Nair subdivisions in descending order of rank according to standard descriptions, compiled by C J Fuller in 1975
Ranking	Jatinirnayam (Note: Quoted by Fuller, citing K. P. Padmanabha Menon, History of Kerala, volume 3 (1933), pp. 192–195)	Aiya (1906) (Note: Quoted by Fuller, citing V. Nagam Aiya, The Travancore State Manual, volume 2 (1906), pp. 348–349)	Iyer (1912) (Note: Quoted by Fuller, citing L. K. Anantha Krishna Iyer, The Cochin Tribes and Castes, volume 2 (1912), pp. 14–18)	Innes (1908) (Note: Quoted by Fuller, citing C. A. Innes, Madras District Gazetteers: Malabar and Anjengo, (ed. F. B. Evans), volume 1 (1908), pp. 116–120)	Gough (1961) (Note: Quoted by Fuller, citing E. Kathleen Gough, Nayar, Central Kerala in Matrilineal Kinship, (ed. D. M. Schneider & E. K. Gough), (1961), pp. 308–312)
1	Kiriyam	Kiriyam	Kiriyam	Kiriyam	Kiriyam
2	Illam	Illam	Illam	Purattu Charna	Purattu Charna
3	Svarupam	Svarupam	Svarupam	Akattu Charna	Akattu Charna
4	Padamangalam	Padamangalam	Purattu & Akattu Charna	Illam	Pallicchan
5	Tamil Padam	Tamil Padam	Menokki	Mutta	Illam
6	Itasseri	Itasseri	Maran	Taraka	Vattakkatan
7	Maran (or Maarar)	Maran	Padamangalam	Ravari	Otattu
8	Chempukotli	Chempukotli	Pallicchan	Anduran	Anduran
9	Otattu	Otattu	Vattakkatan	Otattu	Asthikkuracchi
10	Pallicchan	Kalamkotti	Chempukotti	Pallicchan	Veluttetan
11	Matavan/Puliyath	Vattakkatan	Otattu	Urali	Vilakkittalavan
12	Kalamkotti/Anduran	Pallicchan	Itasseri	Chempukotti	
13	Vattakkatan/Chakkala	Asthikkuracchi	Anduran	Vattakkatan	
14	Asthikkuracchi/Chitikan	Chetti	Asthikkuracchi	Asthikkuracchi/Chitikan	
15	Chetti	Chaliyan	Tarakan	Kulangara	
16	Chaliyan	Veluttetan	Vilakkittalavan	Itasseri	
17	Veluttetan	Vilakkittalavan	Veluttetan	Veluttetan	
18	Vilakkittalavan		Chaliyan	Vilakkittalavan	
19				Kaduppattam	
20				Chaliyan	

A re-evaluation of the broad system of classification took place from the late 1950s. Fuller, writing in 1975, claims that the approach to classification by use of titular names was a misconception. People could and did award themselves the titles; and on those occasions when a title was in fact bestowed, it nonetheless did not signify their subgroup. He argues that the broad outline of the subdivisions

... embodies, so to speak, a caste system within a caste system. Except for high-ranking priests, the Nayar subdivisions mirror all the main caste categories: high-status aristocrats, military and landed; artisans and servants; and untouchables. But ... this structure is ideal rather than real.

M. N. Srinivas observed in 1957 that, "Varna has been the model to which observed facts have been fitted, and this is true not only of educated Indians, but also of sociologists to some extent." Instead of analysing the structure of the subgroups independently, commentators had explained them inappropriately by using an existing but alien social structure. From this unsuitable methodology had come the notion that the groups were subcastes rather than subdivisions. He also argued, in 1966, that "Some Nayars "ripened" into Samantans and Kshatriyas. The royal lineages of Calicut, Walluvanad, Palghat and Cochin, for instance, although of Nayar origin, considered themselves superior in ritual rank to their Nayar subjects." That is to say, they assumed a position above the status that they were perceived as being by others.

The hypothesis, proposed by writers such as Fuller and Louis Dumont, that most of the subgroups were not subcastes, arises in large part because of the number of ways in which Nairs classified themselves, which far exceeded the 18 or so groups which had previously been broadly accepted. Dumont took the extreme view that the Nairs as a whole could not be defined as a caste in the traditional sense, but Fuller believed this to be unreasonable as, "since the Nayars live in a caste society, they must evidently fit into the caste system at some level or another." The 1891 Census of India listed a total of 128 Nair subgroups in the Malabar region and 55 in the Cochin region, as well as a further 10 in the Madras area but outside Malabar. There were 44 listed in Travancore in the census of 1901. These designations were, however, somewhat fluid: the numbers tended to rise and fall, dependent upon which source and which research was employed; it is likely also that the figures were skewed by Nairs claiming a higher status than they actually had, which was a common practice throughout India. Data from the late 19th-century and early 20th-century censuses indicates that ten of these numerous subdivisions accounted for around 90% of all Nairs, that the five (Note: Fuller names the five highest subdivisions as Kiriyam, Illam, Svarupam, Purattu Charna and Akattu Charna. Of the other five main subdivisions, the Chakkala and Itasseri were to be found in Travancore and the Pallicchan, Vattakkatan and Asthikkuracchi in Cochin and Malabar.) highest ranking of these accounted for the majority, and that some of the subdivisions claimed as little as one member. The writer of the official report of the 1891 census, H A Stuart, acknowledged that some of the recorded subdivisions were in fact merely families and not sub-castes, and Fuller has speculated that the single-member subdivisions were "Nayars satisfying their vanity, I suppose, through the medium of the census."

The revisionist argument, whose supporters also include Joan Mencher, proposes a mixed system. The larger divisions were indeed subcastes, as they demonstrated a stability of status, longevity and geographic spread; however, the smaller divisions were fluid, often relatively short-lived and narrow in geographic placement. These divisions, such as the Veluttetan, Chakkala and Vilakkittalavan, would take titles such as Nair or Nayar in order to boost their social status, as was also the practice with other castes elsewhere, although they were often not recognised as caste members by the higher ranks and other Nairs would not marry with them. It has also been postulated that some exogamous families came together to form small divisions as a consequence of shared work experiences with, for example, a local Nambudiri or Nair chief. These groups then became an endogamous subdivision, in a similar manner to developments of subdivisions in other castes elsewhere. The more subdivisions that were created, the more opportunity there was for social mobility within the Nair community as a whole.

Even the highest ranked of the Nairs, being the kings and chiefs, were no more than "supereminent" subdivisions of the caste, rather than the Kshatriyas and Samantans that they claimed to be. Their claims illustrated that the desires and aspirations of self-promotion applied even at the very top of the community and this extended as far as each family refusing to admit that they had any peers in rank, although they would acknowledge those above and below them. The membership of these two subgroups was statistically insignificant, being a small fraction of 1 per cent of the regional population, but the example of aspirational behaviour which they set filtered through to the significant ranks below them. These subdivisions might adopt a new name or remove themselves from any association with a ritually demeaning occupation in order to assist their aspirations. Most significantly, they adopted hypergamy and would utilise the rituals of thalikettu kalyanam and sambandham, which constituted their traditional version of a marriage ceremony, in order to advance themselves by association with higher-ranked participants and also to disassociate themselves from their existing rank and those below.

==== Attempts to achieve caste cohesion ====
The Nair Service Society (NSS) was founded in 1914. Nossiter has described its purpose at foundation as being "... to liberate the community from superstition, taboo and otiose custom, to establish a network of educational and welfare institutions, and to defend and advance Nair interests in the political arena." Devika and Varghese believe the year of formation to be 1913 and argue that the perceived denial of 'the natural right' of upper castes to hold elected chairs in Travancore, a Hindu state, had pressured the founding of the NSS.

As late as 1975, the NSS still had most of its support in the Central Travancore region, although it also has numerous satellite groups around the world.

From its early years, when it was contending that the Nairs needed to join together if they were to become a political force, it argued that the caste members should cease referring to their traditional subdivisions and instead see themselves as a whole. Census information thereafter appears to have become unreliable on the matter of the subdivisions, in part at least because of the NSS campaign to ensure that respondents did not provide the information requested of them. The NSS also promoted marriage across the various divisions in a further attempt to promote caste cohesion, although in this instance it met with only limited success. Indeed, even in the 1970s, it was likely that cross-subdivision marriage was rare generally, and this was certainly the case in the Central Travancore area.

It has been concluded by Fuller, in 1975, that

... the question of what the Nayar caste is (or was): it is a large, named social group (or, perhaps preferably, category) with a stable status, vis-a-vis other castes in Kerala. It is not, however, a solidary group, and, the efforts of the N.S.S. notwithstanding, it is never likely to become one.

The influence of the NSS, both within the community and in the wider political sphere, is no longer as significant as once it was. It did attempt to reassert its influence in 1973, when it established its own political party—the National Democratic Party—but this lasted only until 1977.

==== Present day ====
Today, the government of India does not treat the Nair community as a single entity. It classifies some, such as the Illathu and Swaroopathu Nairs, as a forward caste, but other sections, such as the Veluthedathu, Vilakkithala and Andhra Nairs, as Other Backward Classes. These classifications are for the purpose of determining which groups of people in certain areas are subject to positive discrimination policies for the purposes of education and employment.

== Historical matrilineal system ==
=== Tharavad ===
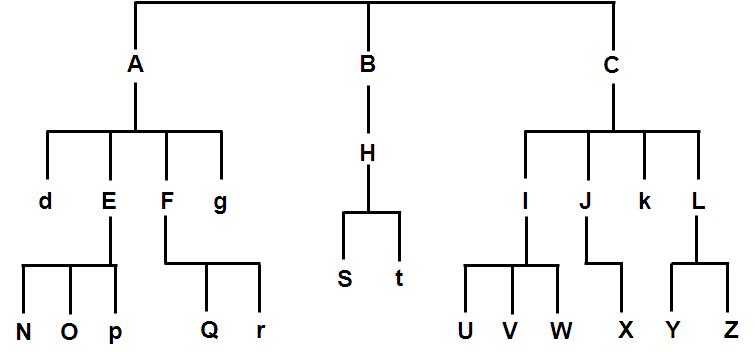
A typical tharavad reproduced from Panikkar's article published in 1918. Capital and small letters represent females and males respectively. Supposing that the females A, B and C were dead and the oldest male member karnavan being d, if the male members t, k and others demanded partition, the property would be divided into three parts.

Nairs operated a matrilineal (marumakkathayam) joint family structure called tharavad, whereby descendant families of one common ancestress lived under a single roof. Tharavads consisting of 50 to 80 members were not uncommon and some with membership as high as 200 have been reported. Only the women lived in the main house; men lived in separate rooms and, on some occasions, lived in a separate house nearby. The families split on instances when they became unwieldy and during crisis among its members. When it split, the family property was separated along the female lines. The karnavan, the oldest male member in the tharavad, had the decision-making authority including the power to manage common property. Panikkar, a well-known writer from the Nair community, wrote in 1918 that,

Authority in the family is wielded by the eldest member, who is called karnavan. He has full control of the common property, and manages the income very much as he pleases. He arranges marriages (sambandhams) for the boys as well as the girls of the family. He had till lately full power (at least in practice) of alienating anything that belonged to them. His will was undisputed law. This is, perhaps, what is intended to be conveyed by the term Matri-potestas in communities of female descent. But it should be remembered that among the Nayars the autocrat of the family is not the mother, but the mother's brother.

The husband visited the tharavad at night and left the following morning and he had no legal obligation to his children which lay entirely with the karnavan. In Nair families, young men and women about the same age were not allowed to talk to each other, unless the young man's sister was considerably older than him. The wife of karnavan had an unusual relationship in his tharavad as she belonged to a different one and her interests lay there. Panikkar wrote that Karnavan loved his sister's son more than his own and he believes it was due mainly to the instability of Nair marriages. Divorce rate was very high as both man and woman had equal right to terminate the marriage. Enangar was another family with which a tharavad remained closely related; a few such related families formed a social group whose members participated in all social activities. Nakane wrote in 1956 that tharavads as a functional unit had ceased to exist and large buildings that had once hosted large tharavads were occupied by just a few of its remnants.

=== Marriage system ===
Fuller has commented that "The Nayars' marriage system has made them one of the most famous of all communities in anthropological circles", and Amitav Ghosh says that, although matrilineal systems are not uncommon in communities of the south Indian coast, the Nairs "have achieved an unparalleled eminence in the anthropological literature on matrilineality". None of the rituals survive in any significant way today. Two forms of ritual marriage were traditional:

- the pre-puberty rite for girls known as thalikettu kalyanam, which was usually followed by sambandham when they became sexually mature. The sambandham was the point at which the woman might take one or more partners and bear children by them, giving rise to the theories of them engaging in polyandrous practices. A ritual called the tirandukuli marked the first menstruation and usually took place between these two events.
- a form of hypergamy, (Note: There are differences in the form of hypergamy common to south India and that which existed in north India, and these have been subject to much academic discussion.) whereby high-ranked Nairs married Samantans, Kshatriyas and Brahmins.

There is much debate about whether the traditional Nair rituals fitted the traditional definition of marriage and which of thalikettu kalyanam or sambandham could lay claim to it. Thomas Nossiter has commented that the system "was so loosely arranged as to raise doubts as to whether 'marriage' existed at all."

==== Thalikettu kalyanam ====
The thali is an emblem shaped like a leaf and which is worn as a necklace. The wearing of it has been compared to a wedding ring as for most women in south India it denotes that they are married. The thalikettu kalyanam was the ritual during which the thali would be tied on a piece of string around the neck of a Nair girl. If the girl should reach puberty before the ceremony took place then she would in theory have been out-caste, although it is probable that this stricture was not in fact observed.

The ritual was usually conducted approximately every 10–12 years for all girls, including infants, within a tharavad who had not previously been the subject of it. Higher-ranked groups within the caste, however, would perform the ritual more frequently than this and in consequence the age range at which it occurred was narrower, being roughly between age 10 and 13. This increased frequency would reduce the likelihood of girls from two generations being involved in the same ceremony, which was forbidden. The karnavan organised the elaborate ritual after taking advice from prominent villagers and also from a traditional astrologer, known as a Kaniyan. A pandal was constructed for the ceremony and the girls wore ornaments specifically used only on those occasions, as well as taking a ritual bath in oil. The ornaments were often loaned as only a few villagers would possess them. The person who tied the thali would be transported on an elephant. The higher the rank of that person then the greater the prestige reflected on to the tharavad, and also vice versa since some people probably would refuse to act as tier in order to disassociate themselves from a group and thereby bolster their claims to be members of a higher group. Although information is far from complete, those who tied the thali for girls of the aristocratic Nair families of Cochin in Central Kerala appear to have been usually Samantans, who were of higher rank, or occasionally the Kshatriyas, who were still higher. The Nambudiri Brahmins of Central Kerala acted in that role for the royal house of Cochin (who were Kshatriyas), but whether they did so for other Kshatriyas is less certain. The Kshatriyas would tie for the Samantans. Having the thali of each girl tied by a different man was more prestigious than having one tier perform the rite for several girls. The thali tying was followed by four days of feasting, and on the fourth day the marriage was dissolved.

The girl often never saw the man who tied the thali again and later married a different man during the sambandham. However, although she neither mourned the death of her sambandham husband nor became a widow, she did observe certain mourning rituals upon the death of the man who had tied her thali. Panikkar argues that this proves that the real, religious marriage is the thalikettu kalyanam, although he also calls it a "mock marriage". He believes that it may have come into existence to serve as a religious demarcation point. Sexual morality was lax, especially outside the higher ranks, and both relationship break-ups and realignments were common; the thali kalyanam legitimised the marital status of the woman in the eyes of her faith prior to her becoming involved in the amoral activities that were common practice.

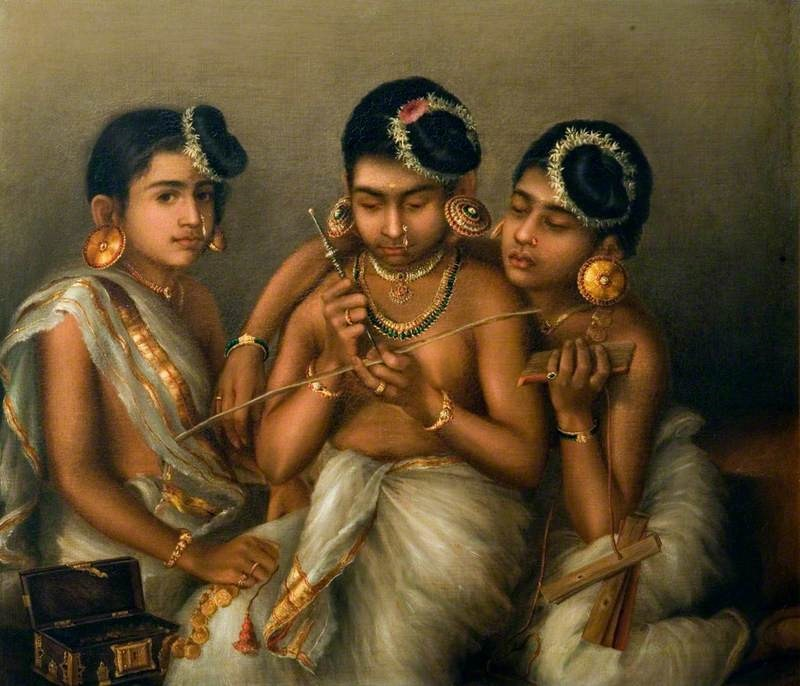
Three Nayar Girls of Travancore (1872) by Ramaswami Naidu. Nair children in tharavads typically played with each other, ran small errands and tasks, and would likely later undergo the thali tying ceremony together.

It has been noted that there were variations to the practice. Examples include that the person who tied the thali might be a close female relative, such as the girl's mother or aunt, and that the ceremony conducted by such people might take place outside a temple or as a small ceremony at the side of a more lavish thalikettu kalyanam rather than in the tharavadu. These variations were probably exceptional and would have applied to the poorest families. Fuller has also remarked that if each girl had her own thali tier, rather than one being used to perform the ritual for several girls at the same ceremony, then this presented the possibility of a subsequent divergence of status with the matrilineal line of the tharavadu, leading to more subdivisions and a greater chance that one or more of the girls might advance their status later in life.

==== Sambandham ====
Panikkar says that for Nairs the real marriage, as opposed to a symbolic one, was sambandham, a word that comes from Sanskrit and translates as "good and close union". The Nair woman had sambandham relationships with Brahmins and Kshatriyas, as well as other Nairs. He is of the opinion that the system existed principally to facilitate the wedding of Nair women to Nambudiri Brahmins. In the Malabar region, only the eldest male member of a Brahmin family was usually allowed to marry within their caste. There were some circumstances in which a younger male was permitted to do so, these being with the consent of the elder son or when he was incapable of marriage. This system was designed to protect their traditions of patrilineality and primogeniture. A consequence of it was that the younger sons were allowed to marry women from the highest subdivisions of the Nair caste. The Nair women could marry the man who had tied their thali, provided that he was not otherwise restricted by the rules that women were not permitted to marry a man from a lower caste or subdivision, nor to marry anyone in the direct matrilineal line of descent (however far back that may be) or close relatives in the patrilineal line, nor a man less than two years her senior.

The sambandham ceremony was simple compared to the thalikettu kalyanam, being marked by the gift of clothes (pudava) to the bride in front of some family members of both parties to the arrangement. There might also be other gifts, presented at the time of the main Malayalam festivals. If the sambandham partner was a Brahmin man or the woman's father's sister's son (which was considered a proper marriage because it was outside the direct line of female descent) then the presentation was a low-key affair. However, sambandham rituals were more elaborate, sometimes including feasts, when a "stranger" from within the Nair caste married the woman. The ceremony took place on a day deemed to be auspicious by priests.

The sambandham relationship was usually arranged by the karanavan but occasionally they would arise from a woman attracting a man in a temple, bathing pool or other public place. The first sambandham of a man was deemed to be momentous and his ability to engage in a large number of such relationships increased his reputation in his community. Sambandham relationships could be broken, due to differences between the spouses or because a karavanan forced it due to being pressured by a man of higher rank who desired to marry the woman. Marriage by sambandham was neither legally recognised nor binding. The relationship could end at will and the participants could remarry without any ramifications. Attempts to regulate sambandham marriages by the Nayar Regulation Act of 1912 in Travancore and the Malabar Marriage Act of 1896 in British Malabar were not very successful.

Any children borne by the woman had to be claimed by one of her sambandham partners if she was to avoid being out-caste, sold into slavery or even executed. There was a presumption that unclaimed children were the consequence of her having a relationship with a man from a lower caste, which could not be the case if the child was claimed because of the caste restrictions imposed in the selection of sambandham partners:

... a caste is a bilateral grouping and a child's place in the caste society cannot be determined by only one parent. Further, the Indian system of status attribution, under most circumstances, proscribes sexual relations between a woman and a man of status lower than herself, and generally denies to any children born of such a union membership of either parent's caste. For these reasons, some recognition of paternity and an assurance that the genitor is of the right status is necessary - even if it is only the minimal one of a man asserting paternity.

==== Hypergamy ====
The Nambudiri Brahmin tradition which limited the extent of marriage within their own caste led to the practice of hypergamy. Gough notes that

These hypergamous unions were regarded by Brahmans as socially acceptable concubinage, for the union was not initiated with Vedic rites, the children were not legitimized as Brahmans, and neither the woman nor her child was accorded the rights of kin. By the matrilineal castes, however, the same unions were regarded as marriage, for they fulfilled the conditions of ordinary Nayar marriage and served to legitimize the child as an acceptable member of his matrilineal lineage and caste.

The disparity in caste ranking in a relationship between a Brahmin man and a Nair woman meant that the woman was unable to live with her husband(s) in the Brahmin family and so remained in her own family. The children resulting from such marriages always became Nairs. Panikkar argues that it is this type of relationship that resulted in the matrilineal and matrilocal system. It has also been argued that the practice, along with judicious selection of the man who tied the thali, formed a part of the Nair aspirational culture whereby they would seek to improve their status within the caste. Furthermore, that

... among the higher-ranking Nayars (and Kshatriyas and Samantans) in contradistinction to the "commoner" Nayars, no two subdivisions admitted to equal status. Thus the relations set up by the tall-rite [ie: the thalikettu kalyanam] and the sambandham union were always hypergamous.

Although it is certain that in theory hypergamy can cause a shortage of marriageable women in the lowest ranks of a caste and promote upwards social movement from the lower Nair subdivisions, the numbers involved would have been very small. It was not a common practice outside the higher subcaste groups.

==== Polyandry ====
Fuller argues that there is overwhelming evidence that Nair women as well as men had more than one sambandham partner at the same time, that "both men and women could have several partners at once, and either party was free to break the relationship, for any reason or for none, whenever they wished."

He believes that both polyandrous sambandhams and hypergamy were most common in Central Kerala. In northern Travancore there appears not to have been as great a prevalence of hypergamy because of a relative scarcity of Brahmins living there. Fuller believes that in the relatively undocumented southern Travancore monogamy may have been predominant, and that although the matrilineal joint family still applied it was usually the case that the wife lived with the tharavad of her husband.

Nancy Levine and Walter Sangree state that while Nair women were maritally involved with a number of men, the men were also married to more than one woman. The women and their husbands did not live together and their relationship had no meaning other than "sexual liaison" and legitimacy for the children.

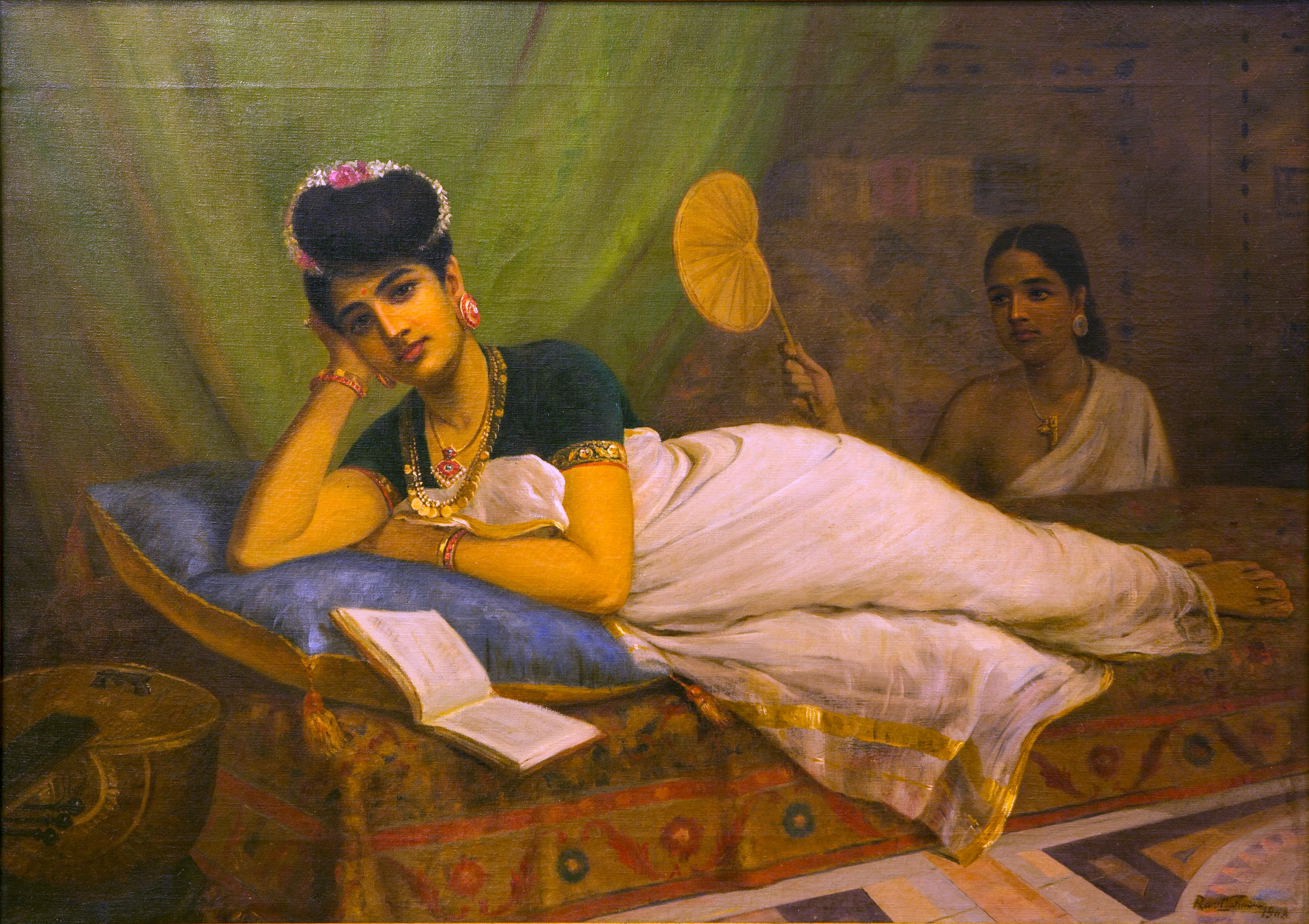
Reclining Nayar Woman (1902) by Raja Ravi Varma shows a Nair lady, identified as the character Indulekha, a main character from a Malayalam novel of the same name. The novel had criticized the Nair matrilocal and matrilineal system; notably the relationships with Nambudiri Brahmins.

Gough has gone further than Fuller with regard to the interpretation of events in the north, believing that there is no evidence of polyandry in that area at all. She argues that all European travelogues describing polyandry came from the region of Central Kerala. Gough notes the differing personal experiences of earlier Nair commentators and that this could go some way to explaining the varied pronouncement: Panikkar, who queries the existence of polyandry, comes from the northern Travancore region; that A. Aiyappan, who acknowledges its existence, comes from Central Kerala; and that both have based their writings on customs they grew up with in their very different environs.

==== Decline of traditional practices ====
The practices of thalikettu kalyanam, the polyandrous sambandhams, and also the existence of large tharavads declined during the nineteenth century, as did that of hypergamy. Monogamy and small nuclear family units became the norm, as they were elsewhere in the country. This process occurred more rapidly in some areas than in others, and in Central Kerala the traditional systems still lingered as late as the 1960s, although hypergamy had largely disappeared everywhere by the 1920s. A possible reason for the various rates of change across the region lies in the extent to which the various agrarian local economies were dominated by the Nairs.

V. K. S. Nayar has said that, "the matrilineal system tends to produce a society at once hierarchical and authoritarian in outlook. The system is built round family pride as well as loyalty to the karavanar". Nossiter cites this as one reason why it was "congruent with the role of a military caste in a feudal society." and explains that the decline in the traditional warrior role, the rise of an economy based on money, together with the ending of agricultural slavery and the effects of western education, all combined to cause the decline of the traditional practices. All of these factors were having an impact during the 19th century and they caused erosion of the social dominance which the Nairs once held, eventually reaching a point some time between World War I and World War II where that dominance was lost, although there was an attempt to reassert it in Travancore during the 1930s when the Diwan Sir C. P. Ramaswamy Iyer adopted a pro-Nair stance and an oppressive attitude towards communities such as the Syrian Christians. (Note: The attitude of Sir C. P. Ramaswamy Iyer during the 1930s reflected a concern among Hindus that the Christian population of Travancore was rising and that there was a consequent danger of the region becoming a Christian state. The 1931 census recorded over 31 per cent of the population as being Christian, compared to around 4 per cent in 1820.) The main beneficiaries in the shifting balance of social influence were the Syrian Christians and the Ezhavas. The former, in particular, were in a position to acquire, often by subdivision, the economically unviable tharavad buildings and landholdings around the time of the Great Depression. The role of the Nair Service Society in successfully campaigning for continued changes in practices and legislation relating to marriage and inheritance also played its part. This collapse of the rural society facilitated the rise of the socialist and communist political movements in the region.

== Demographics ==
The 1968 Socio-Economic Survey by the Government of Kerala gave the population of the Nair community as approximately 14.5% (2.9 million) of the total population of the state.

== See also ==
- C. Krishna Pillai
- List of Nairs
- Nambiar
- Mamankam
- Moopil Nair
- Onnu Kure Áyiram Yogam
- Nair ceremonies and customs
