= Vilakkithala Nair =

Nair sub caste

The Vilakkithala Nair are a caste found in Kerala state, India.

The Vilakkithala Nair samajam taluk union conducts Thalapoli at the Vaikom Mahadeva temple.

== See also ==
- Nair
- Nair subcast
