= Kettu Kalyanam =

Indian marriage ceremony

Kettu Kalyanam, also known as Thali Kettu, was the name of an elaborate ceremonial mock marriage of the Samanthan, Nair, Maarar, and Ambalavasi communities of the southern Indian state of Kerala. The customs of this marriage varied from region to region and caste to caste. Among the higher class Nairs in Travancore, Cochin and North Malabar, mostly a person of the same caste or sometimes a Malayali Brahmin (Nambudiri or Potti) is invited for the purpose of tying the Tali and performing rituals. In South Malabar, a person who belongs to the same caste or Thirumulpad, or Pattar (Tamil Brahmin) is invited to act as bridegroom.

Sambandham (a matrilineal form of marriage) might take place only if the bride had already had this elaborate ritual mock-marriage known as Kettu Kalyanam. The Kettu Kalyanam is ceremonial only, for after the rituals the groom returns to his house never to meet the bride again. In some parts of Malabar, immediately after the ceremony a formal divorce is constituted, whereas in other areas the groom enters into sambandham with the girl and becomes her husband in practice if the girl is of marriageable age.

== Ceremonies ==
Among the communities that practiced the custom, a grand ceremony would be held at its oldest ancestral house. All the girls of appropriate ageof the lineage of one generation were ritually married to the chosen bridegrooms of enangar (linked neighborhood kinship groups not of the same family group as the brides). This ceremony, called tālikettukalyānam ("tāli-tying ceremony") had to be performed for each girl before puberty, on pain of her excommunication from her caste. The ceremonial rituals would last for seven days. The bridegroom can either be a boy or man. At the ceremony, each bridegroom, in the company of representatives of every household in the neighbourhood, ties a gold ornament (tāli) round the neck of his bride, a symbol of married women. Each couple is then secluded in a room of the ancestral house for three days and nights. On the fourth day the bridegrooms depart; they have no further obligations, and do not need to visit the brides again unless they want to go through the sambandham ritual.

== Kinship and purpose ==
The principal purpose of the ritual was to lessen the excessive heat and sexual desire, which is considered to be higher in pubescent virgins. The virgin girls are associated with the goddess Bhadrakali, the pre-eminent deity in Kerala, and men are generally reluctant to deflower them as they are believed to be highly dangerous. After this ritual, a girl was regarded as no longer being a dangerous virgin, they could began having sexual relationships. Thus, being regarded as having attained the status of a mature woman, they are ready to bear children to perpetuate their lineage. This social recognition of marriageability was entirely separate from community acknowledgement of physical maturity upon reaching puberty. For that, there was a separate ceremony, Thirandu Kalyanam, performed at a girl's menarche.

The tāli-tying ritual was both a religious and legal ceremony between the lineage and enangu group, and thus can be seen as a form of mass marriage, even though it is in practice only a mock-marriage, while the later sambandham are actual marriages.

The practice of this ritual is in decline since the 1920s after introduction of marriage reforms and societies switching away from matrilineality.
