= Nair ceremonies and customs =

Traditional culture of Nair caste

There are numerous ceremonies and customs adopted by the Nair caste, which is prominent in the South Indian state of Kerala.

== Ceremonial art forms ==
=== Kalarippayattu ===
Kalarippayattu training is undertaken by every youth of the Nair community. The practice was established by Parashuraman, Durga, and Bhadrakali.

Shri Kallanthattil Gurukkal (a Nampoothiri Brahmin), King Marthanda Varma, Shri Pazhassiraja, Guru of Kallanthattil Gurukkal (Kolathiri rajah) all learned kalarippayattu.

Kalaripayattu is commonly practiced among Savarna castes of Kerala. However, later it is also start learned other communities includes Muslims, Christians, Ezhavas and Nadars, despite their pacifism.

=== Kathakali ===
Kathakali is a dance-drama which portrays scenes from Hindu epics or stories. It is a classical dance form of Kerala demanding long years of training. Believed to have evolved from Ramanattam, another classical art form composed by Kottarakkara Thampuran, Kathakali incorporates the techniques of some of the major ritual art forms of Kerala. The dance-drama was historically performed exclusively by Nairs and had always been associated with them. Nair rulers and chiefs patronized the art and Kathakali had foundations in Nair military training and religious customs.

=== Velakali ===
Velakali is a ritualistic martial arts form performed by Nair men in some temples of southern Kerala. The form depicts the fight between the Pandavas and Kauravas. It originated in Ambalappuzha, where Mathoor Panicker, chief of the Chempakasserri army, employed it to boost the martial spirit of the people. Dancers wear colorful and attractive costumes similar to that of the Nair soldiers of the olden days. The dancers carry a painted shield in their left hand and a stick (Churikakkol) in their right hand. The performance resembles actions in a battle. Percussion instruments like thavil, shudha madhalam, elathalam, kombu, and kuzhal are used.

== Earlier customs and traditions ==
=== Marumakkathayam and Tharavadu ===
Marumakkathayam is matrilineality. Tharavad is a subclan household, which was matrilineal for Nairs, headed by the eldest male member of the family (known as Karanavan) while other male members were known as Anandravan. It is also practiced by Bunts of Tulunad.

=== Sambandham and related customs ===
Before 1937 in Cochin, before 1928 in Travancore, and before 1933 in Malabar, Nairs had three major marriage/rite of passage ceremonies. Kettu Kalyanam (mock marriage ceremony/ auspicious ceremony), Thirandu Kalyanam (menstrual ceremony) and Gunadosha-Sambandham/Pudamuri/Pudavakoda (cloth-giving ceremony, actual union).

==== Kettu Kalyanam ====
The Kettu Kalyanam was an elaborate mock marriage ceremony. After it was completed, the groom had no obligation to the bride. This was required to be performed by the bride before her Sambandham, the genuine marriage ceremony.

==== Sambandham/Podamuri/Pudava Koda/Mundukoda ====
The Sambandham ritual was less religious than the thaali and puberty rites, and means "alliance" or "relationship". It was a form of marriage alliance between men and women following marumakkathayam. The ritual was comparatively simple. It begins with the groom, of the same or higher subcaste/caste of the bride and whose horoscope has been checked and matched with hers. He gives a piece of cloth (Pudava) to the bride in front of a lit lamp (symbolizing Agni) and eight auspicious objects (Ashtamangalyam), witnessed by the bride's kin and the groom's friends/kin. Sambandham was not necessarily a permanent arrangement (unlike Vedic Vivaha of Brahmins and many other castes, where the concept of divorce did not exist), even though in many or most cases it was lifelong. However, his innate weakness, i.e. divorce being permitted, of sambandham that helped maintain the integrity of the matrilineal tharavadu.

A contemporary account of a Sambandham ceremony held in Thiruvananthapuram in 1904, hosted by C.V. Raman Pillai, described the ritual proceedings in detail. The bridegroom sat cross-legged on layered cloths — a red cloth on the ground, a white cloth over it, and a coloured cloth on top — facing east. Before him were geometric patterns drawn in rice flour, two brass lamps with coconut oil and multiple wicks, and a para (measure) of clean paddy heaped in a cone with a sprig of coconut blossom, symbolising prosperity and plenty. A Brahmin was seated opposite the bridegroom to receive dakshina and handed the ceremonial cloth to the groom at the auspicious time, accompanied by traditional music. The bride then entered, made obeisance to the bridegroom with folded hands, received the cloth from him, bowed to the Brahmin and to the assembled company, and withdrew, while Nair women inside the house raised the kurava (ululation). The account noted that the use of a coloured cloth over white, and the presence of a particular inverted brass vessel, were privileges restricted to high-ranking Nair subcastes such as Thampis and Chempakassery Nairs; lower-ranking Nairs were permitted only a plain white cloth and no such vessel. The same account observed that the 1904 ceremony showed several departures from older custom, including the bridegroom wearing a Western-style white suit instead of the traditional two plain cloths, the giving of a ring alongside the cloth, and the invitation of European guests — practices described as recent innovations at the time.

Sambandham can denote hypergamy between Nair women and Namboothiri men as well. Among the Namboodiris only the eldest son was permitted to marry (Veli, or Vedic Vivaha) within his caste (primogeniture) to maintain the integrity of ancestral property. The remaining younger sons marry through Sambandham with Kshatriya subcastes of Nairs or Samantha Kshatriya princesses (Royal families) or Ambalavasi. Since the offspring of these alliances were, as per Marumakkathayam, legally members of their mothers' castes and families, the Namboodiri father would not be legally obliged to provide for them. However, in most cases, he would give a part of the self-acquired property. This was known as Putravakasham (son's right) or Acchankoduthathu (father's gift). For the matrilineal castes, Sambandhams with Brahmins were a matter of prestige and social status. Thus, Sambandham was in both ways a gain to the castes involved. Namboodiri-Kshatriya and Namboodiri-Nair Sambandhams may also be considered morganatic marriages, for while the husband was of higher social status and the mother of relatively lower status, the children were still considered legitimate even though they did not inherit the titles or wealth of their fathers. However, Marxist and feminist anthropologist Kathleen Gough argues that there is little evidence that polyandry was rarely practiced in a few areas before 1800, while famous Kerala historian and anthropologist K. M. Panikkar has stated that "Nairs have no tradition of polyandry" in his 1918 paper about Nairs published by the Royal Anthropological Institute.

In the case of sambandham with Namboothiri men, the system benefited both the Namboothiri Brahmins as well as matrilineal castes like the Nairs for two reasons. First, Namboothiri Brahmins had institutionalized primogeniture, permitting only the eldest son to marry within the caste. Younger sons (also called aphans) in Namboothiri families were expected to establish sambandham with higher caste Nair (equivalent to Kshatriyas), Ambalavasi (temple service caste), royal Samantan or Kshatriya women. This allowed Nambudiri Brahmins to have more influence through close blood relations with the ruling elite and martial castes. Secondly, Nair families encouraged the sambandham arrangement with Namboothiri men, who were not involved in warfare and provided stable alliances, also increasing their tharavadu and caste status.
