= Sambandam =

Historic type of informal marriage in Kerala, India

Sambandam was the traditional marriage practiced by Nambudiris, Nairs, Samanthan and Ambalavasis among their own communities as well as with each other, in Kerala, India.

"Sambandham" was derived from the Sanskrit words "Sama" meaning "equal" and "Bandham" meaning "alliance."

== Practice ==
=== Samanthan, Nairs and Ambalavasi ===
Sambantham is the marriage tradition among the traditional matrilineal castes. Members of Samanthan, Nairs and Ambalavasi castes can marry within their own community or from higher Brahmin (Nambudiri caste).

=== Nambuthiri Brahmins ===
Nambuthiri Brahmins, in particular, follow specific marriage customs. The eldest Nambuthiri Brahmin must marry within his own community, while others can marry from the Kshatriya or equivalent. They are allowed to marry women only from royal families, the highest subcaste of Nair, and Ambalavasi castes. Sometimes, they even engage in sambantham with Paradesi Brahmins. Marrying women from other castes is highly restricted and results in loss of caste.

== History ==
Many regions of Kerala limited this practice between Nambudiri, Nair, Samantha Kshatriya, and Ambalavasi castes. Sambandham also denoted reciprocal marriage among Samanthan, Nairs, Amabalavasis, Nambudiris, Royal families and this term was not used just to denote hypergamous marriages between the Nambudiris and the Samanthan Nairs, Amabalavasis and Royal families. Alternate names for the system were used by different social groups and in different regions; they included Pudavamuri, Pudavakoda, Vastradanam, Vitaram Kayaruka, Mangalam and Uzhamporukkuka.

The ritual starts with the matching of the horoscope of the girl with the boy and after the matching information is given to Karanavan (who is the leader of the Nair joint family) of the boy’s family. Once the horoscope gets matched the Karanavan who is the uncle of the boy along with his relatives is invited by the girl’s family for a feast in a particular place. The feasting is called Ayani Unu and the boy is called as “Manavalan” or “Pillai” which means bridegroom. F. Fawcett described the ritual in 1905:

"The Manavalan is then taken to the centre of the pandal where bamboo-mats, carpets, and white cloths are spread, and seated there. The brother of the girl then carries her from inside of the house, and after going round the pandal three times, places her at the left side of the Manavalan, and the father of the girl then presents a new cloth tied in a kambli to the pair, and with this new cloth (technically called ‘ mantravadi’) they change their dress. The wife of the Karanavan of the girl’s taravad, if she be of the same caste, then decorates the girl by putting anklets, etc. The Purohita called ‘ Elayatu’ (a class of Brahmans) then gives the tali to the Manavalan, and the family astrologer shouts 'Muhurtham’ (auspicious hour), and the Manavalan, putting his sword on the lap, ties tali around the girl's neck, who is then required to hold an arrow and a looking-glass in her hand. In rich families, a Brahmini sings certain songs intended to bless the couple. In ordinary families who cannot procure her presence, a certain Nayar who is versed in songs performs the office. The boy and the girl are then carried by Enangans to a decorated apartment in the inner part of the house, where they are required to remain under a sort of pollution for three days. On the fourth day they bathe in some neighbouring tank or river and, they come home preceded by a procession, which varies in importance according to the wealth of the girl’s family. Tom-toms and elephants usually form part of the procession, and saffron water is sprinkled. When they come home the doors of the house are all shut, which the Manavalan is required to force open. He then enters the house, and takes his seat in the northern wing thereof."

This practice stopped during the late 1800s, and is no longer observed.

The Malabar Marriage Act, 1896 defined Sambandham as, "An alliance between a man and a woman, by reason of which they, in accordance with the custom of the community to which they belong, or to which either of them belongs, cohabit or intend to cohabit as husband and wife."

The marriage traditions, as seen today are notably different from those of the past. Many Malayali communities lacked proper marriage practices compared to the Nairs and Nambudhiri Brahmins during that period. Nair women and men enjoyed the highest privileges in society, including the ability to divorce their partners at will, akin to practices in some modern European cultures.

It is also to be noted that even though second marriage after divorce is allowed, it was looked down upon and didn’t involve celebrations as the first marriage, as the 1891 Madras census says: “Sambandham is, strictly speaking, dissoluble at the will of either party without any formal ceremony being gone through for the purpose, but that will is controlled by public opinion which views with disfavour divorces made for trivial reasons. In cases of divorce, the children always go with their mother. Their legal guardian is their uncle, or karanavan (managing member) of the mother’s house. Both widows and divorced women are allowed to remarry, but the second and subsequent marriages of women are not celebrated with even as much formality as the first marriage. The man goes to the woman’s house with friends, and giving her betel-leaves and nut or dresses, takes her to [be his] wife.”

=== Polyandry ===
Some versions of Sambandham allowed polyandry- for one woman to have multiple male partners. Hrishika Jain argued in the Asian Journal of Law and Society that these marriages were de-legitimised by colonial authorities, as incompatible with a Christian patrilinial world view. The topic was a point of discussion during the 1890s marriage law reform in India. Panikkar denied that polyandry had taken place at all; arguing that this was based on travelers' accounts which misunderstood the tradition. Matrilineal communities continued in some areas as late as the 1930s.

== See also ==
- Kettu Kalyanam
- Malayali Brahmins
- Nair ceremonies and customs
- Aliyasantana

== Sources ==
- Moore, Melinda. "Symbol and Meaning in Nayar Marriage Ritual." American Ethnologist. 15 (1998) 254–273
- Gough, K. (1961) Nayar: Central Kearla, in Schneider, D. M. & Gough, K. (Eds.) Matrilineal Kinship. Berkeley & Los Angeles, p298-404
- Karl, R. (2003) Women in Practice: A Comparative Analysis of Gender and Sexuality in India. 2003 Marleigh Grayer Ryan Student Prize ; Moore, M. (1998) Symbol and Meaning in Nayar Marriage Ritual, American Ethnologist 15:254-73
- Damodar Dharmanand Kosambi (1975) An Introduction to the Study of Indian History.
- Dirks, Nicholas. "Homo Hierarchies: Origins of an Idea." Castes of Mind. Princeton: Princeton University Press 2001.
