= Heike Moser =

German Koodiyattam artist and teacher

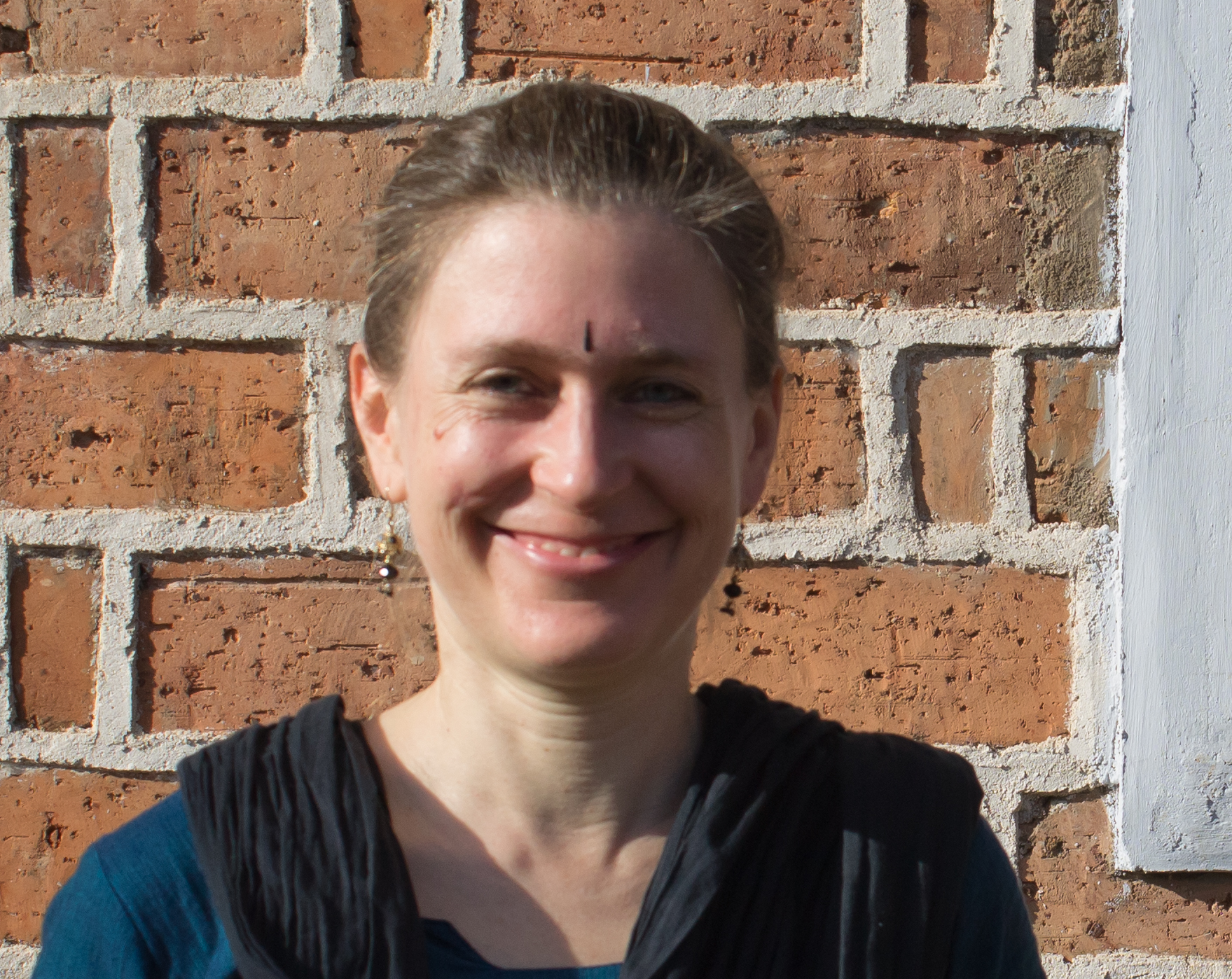
- Moser in 2013
- Born: Heike Moser; Germany
- Occupation: Koodiyattam dancer

Heike Moser is a German Koodiyattam artist and teacher. She is the first foreign women to learn and make debut in Koodiyattam, a traditional art performing in Kerala, India.

== Biography ==
Moser became interested in India after seeing a Bharatnatyam dance performed by Caroline Gerbert Khan in Germany . Moser who was a disciple of Carol used to come to Chennai every year to study Bharatanatyam under Carol's teacher Savitri Jagannatharao. Later she became fascinated with Indology. At Cheruthuruthy, Kerala, she also started learning Koodiyattam from Kalamandalam Girija and Kalamandalam Rama Chakyar at Kerala Kalamandalam. from 1995 to 1998. She received her doctorate from the University of Tübingen in Nangyarkoot. Moser also learned Sanskrit from Killimangalam Vasudevan Namboothiripad.

Moser regularly visits Kerala to participate in the Koodiyattam held near Moozhikulam Lakshmanaswami temple. She was a part of the project of establishing a Malayalam chair in the name of Herman Gundert at the University of Tübingen.
