= Embranthiri =

Malayali Brahmin subcaste

The Embrandiri (Malayalam: എമ്പ്രാന്തിരി), also transliterated as Embranthiri, are a Malayali Brahmin subcaste.
