= Malabar Marriage Act, 1896 =

Law of Madras Presidency, British India

In 1896, the government of Madras passed the Malabar Marriage Act, 1896 in response to the recommendations of the Malabar Marriage Commission of 1891. This allowed members of any caste practising marumakkatayam (matriliny) in Malabar to register a sambandham as a marriage. It was permissive rather than restrictive law: whether or not a relationship was registered was entirely the decision of the people involved in that relationship.

Initiated by the work of Sir C. Sankaran Nair, the measure was largely a failure, with Panikkar noting that in the 20 years following introduction of the Act only six such relationships were registered and that all of those involved family members of Nair himself.

== Sambandham and marumakkatayam ==
The sambandham system of marriage was not recognised by the British colonial government. The civil courts refused jurisdiction, principally because the relationship could so easily be dissolved by either party to it and because there were no rights of property connected to it. Marumakkatayam was also a source of angst among the colonial administrators. Expressions of dissatisfaction with marumakkatayam became prominent in newspapers of the 1870s and 1880s, and were also voiced by the colonial administrator William Logan in an official report of that period. Matters came to a head in 1890 when Nair introduced a bill seeking legitimisation of the customs in the Madras Legislative Council, causing the administration to establish the Malabar Marriage Commission in 1891. This was to investigate matrilineal customs and was also charged with recommending whether or not legal measures should be used to effect changes to the traditional practices for marriage, family organisation and inheritance.
