= Mankavu =

Suburb of Kozhikode in Kerala, India

Coordinates: 11.23780°N 75.80425°E

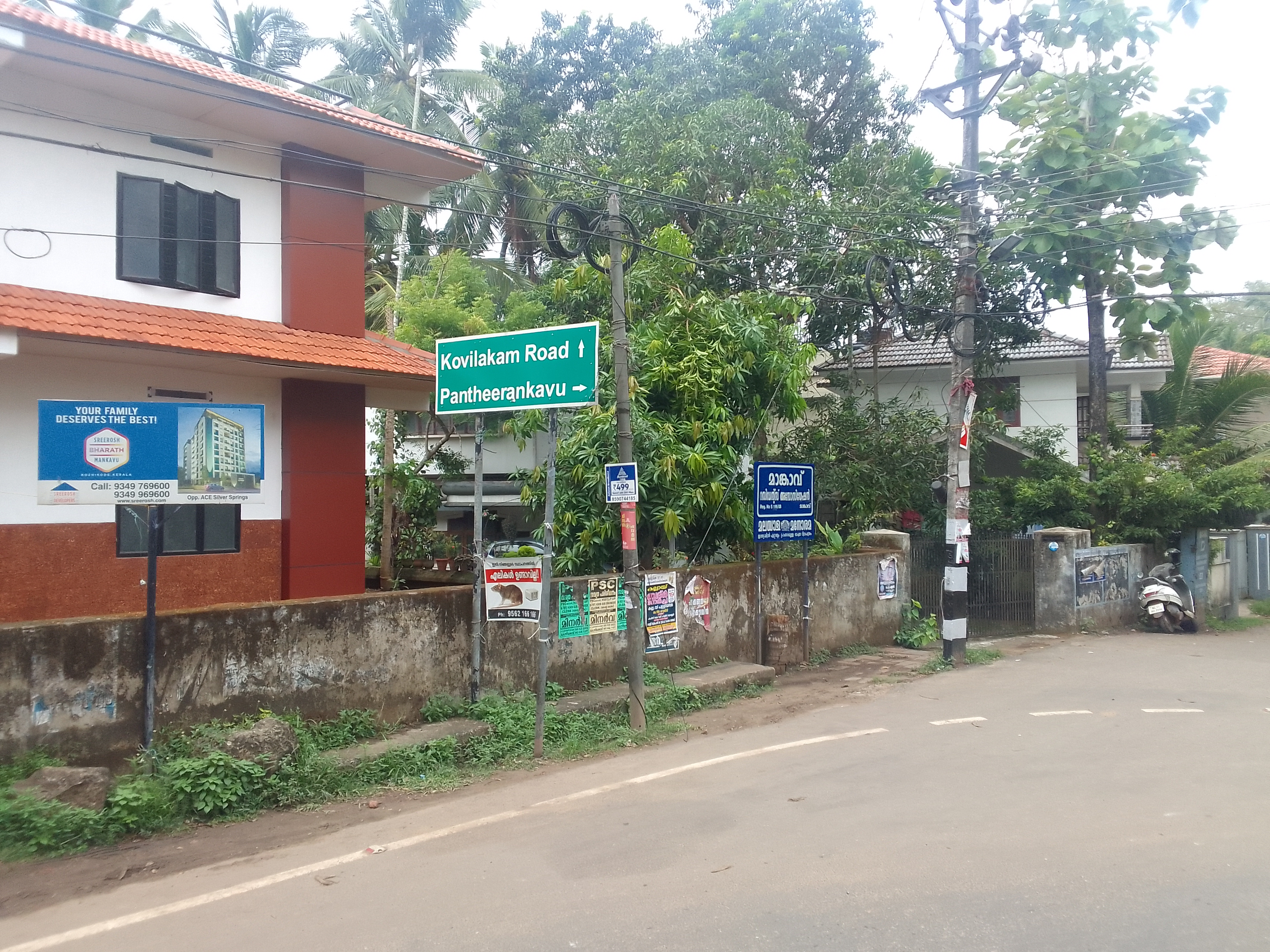

Mankavu is a suburb of Kozhikode, in Kerala, India. It is known as the site of the Zamorin's kovilakam and it is called Mankavu Padinhare Kovilakam. Mankavu derives its name from the Zamorin's Mango Orchard that was in the area some historic records says that earlier was known as "Manavikraman kavu" and got shortened into "Mankave". The community is primarily residential, and is a common residential location for students from the local Zamorin's Guruvayurappan College. Krishna Varma and Ravi Varma, famous rebels of Calicut were born and brought up in Mankavu.

Mini bypass road, a major arterial road in Kozhikode city, passes through Mankavu. The northern entry point of Kozhikode city centre can be said to be this location. Actual Mankavu is situated on the east side of the mini bypass road. It is predominantly inhabited by Muslims and Hindus, which include few Brahmin families around the Thrissala Bhagavathy Kshethram, beyond the Kalpaka Theatre, a known spot in Mankavu. On to the right of the bypass road junction, the road leads to Chalapuram, known for schools, residential colonies, Shiva Kshetram, Ganapathy Kshetram.

Adding glamour to the location and the new entrant is the Lulu Mall, which started operations in September 2024.

Kovilakam Residency, a business class hotel founded by the renowned public figure of Kozhikode Late Shri NB Krishnakurup is located here, at Govindapuram, north of Mankavu.

Thirssala Bhagavathy Kshethram, is the temple associated with the Zamorin's. The temple complex also have deities of Lord Krishna and Lord Shiva.

postal_code: 673007

== Major Organizations ==
- LULU MALL

KOVILAKAM RESIDENCY (P) Ltd

- Malabar Institute of Medical Sciences
- Punjab National Bank Regional Headquarters
- Kerala Land Reforms And Development Co operative Society

== Major Temples ==
- Thrishala Bhagavathi Temple
- Valayanad Devi Temple
- Thalikunnu Mahashiva Temple
- Karthyayani Devi Temple

== Kottooli and Pottammal ==
Govindapuram, Puthiyara and Mankavu are residential suburbs lying on the eastern side of Kozhikode city in India. The road from Pushpa junction connects to Mankavu by the Mooriyad Road which is further extended to Konthanari Road.

The road from Meenchantha junction connects to Mankavu via the bypass road and it goes further north to Kovilakam Residency, Govindapuram and Puthiyara areas and finally terminating at the Arayidathu Palam junction near on the Mavoor Road. The road from Tali temple connects to Govindapuram via the Puthiyapalam Road and the K.P.Panicker Road. Punjab National Bank has a headquarters facility here. Valayanad Temple is situated at Govindapuram. The central school grounds at Govindapuram are situated on a beautiful hillock from where the entire city of Kozhikode and even the Arabian sea are visible.

Govindapuram is connected on the north to Kuthiravattam Mental Hospital by the A.P.Balakrishnan Paillai Road. This road is also connected to Kottooly and Pottammal junctions on the east of Kozhikode city. Calicut Medical College is only five kilometers from here.

Pushpa junction is connected to Mankavu through Madhavan Nair Road. Chalappuram Post Office is on this road and this route passes through Kalur Road Junction and Azhchavattom town before joining Mankavu junction.

After Mankavu town, the bypass passes Govindapuram road, MIMS Hospital and PNB Headquarters before joining the eastern side of Kozhikode city at Arayidathupalam. The Baby Memorial Hospital and Comtrust Eye Hospital are located here. The Sub Jail is another landmark in this place.

== Gallery ==
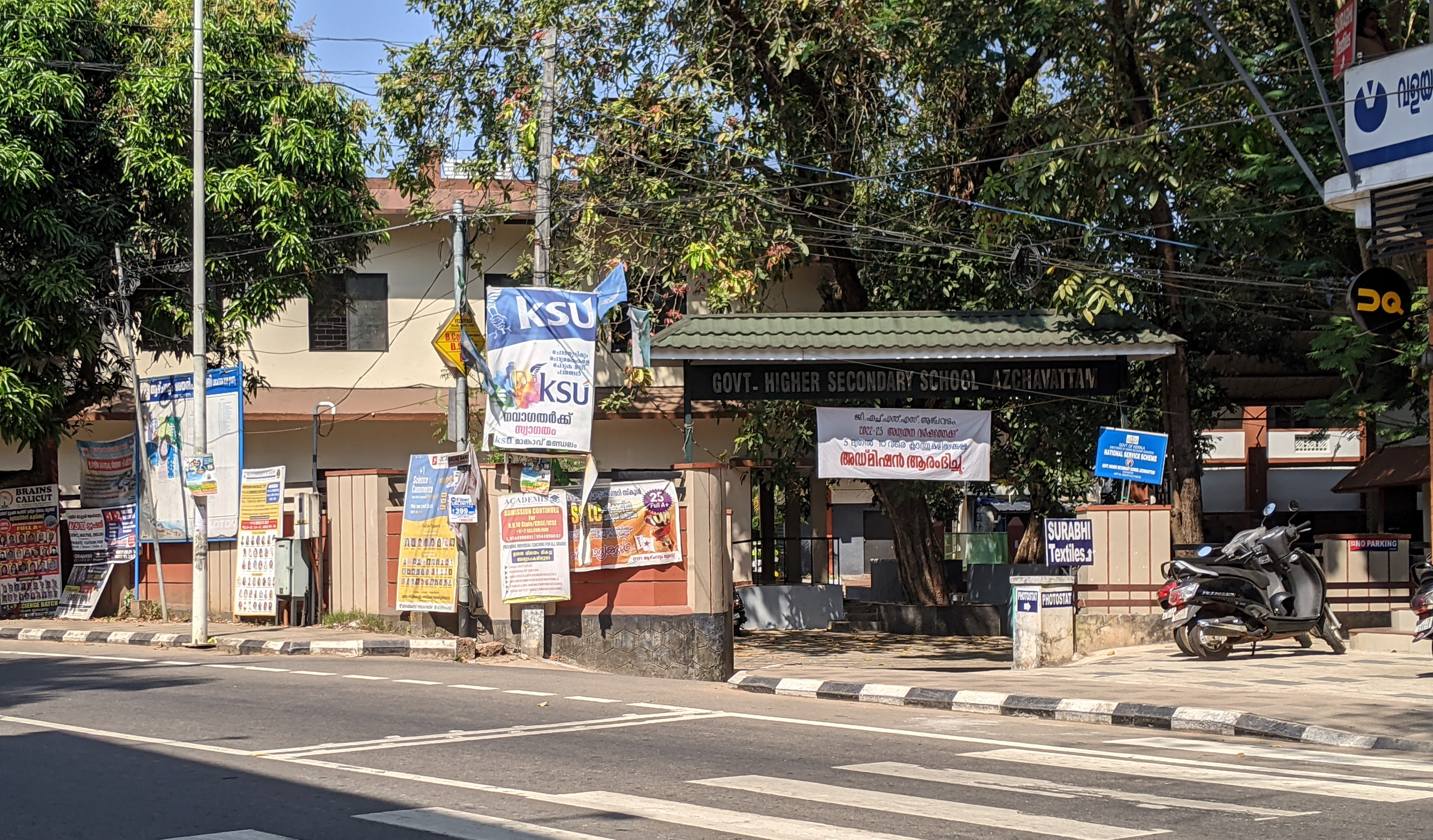
Azchavattam School

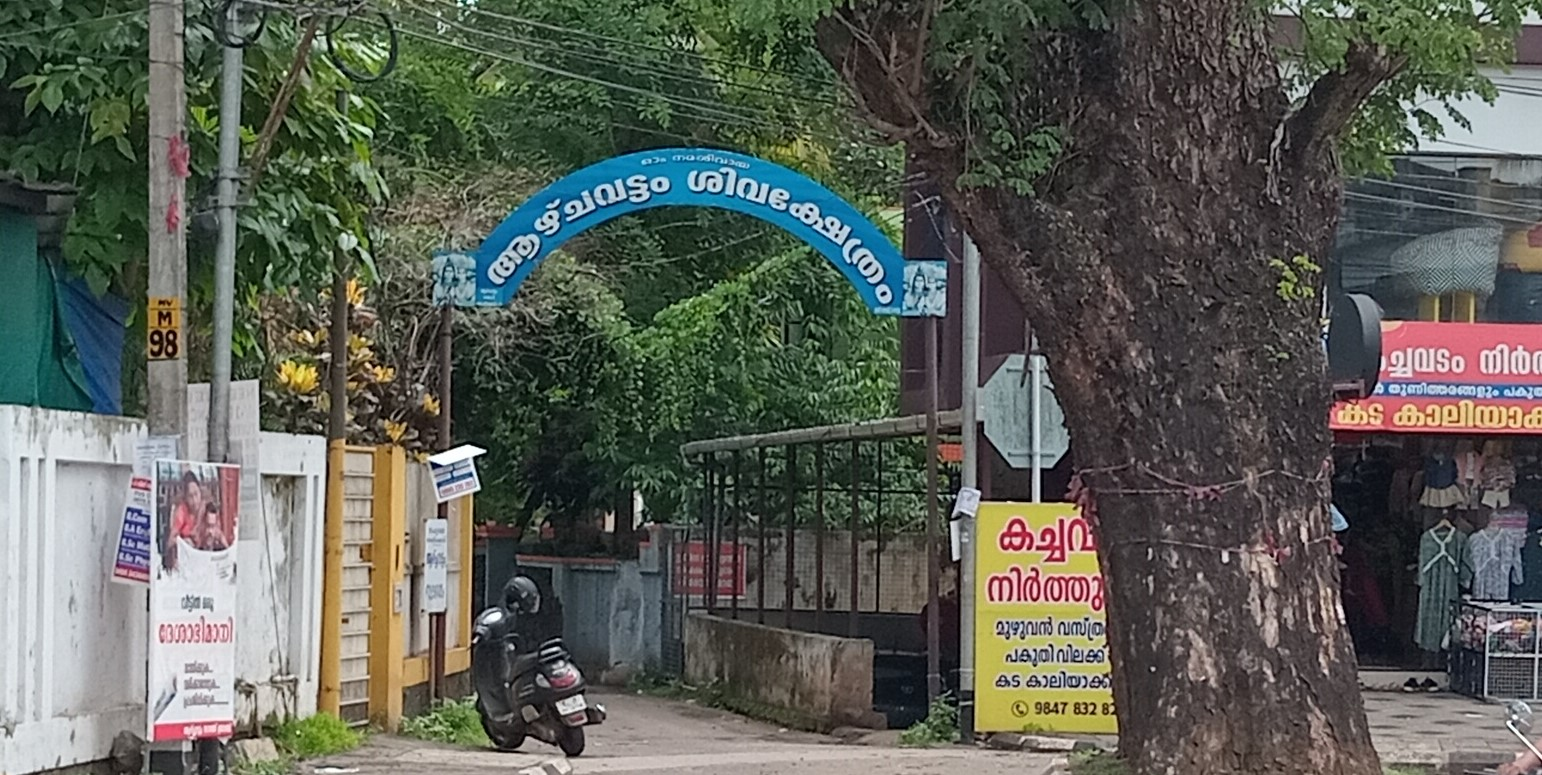
Azhchavattom Temple

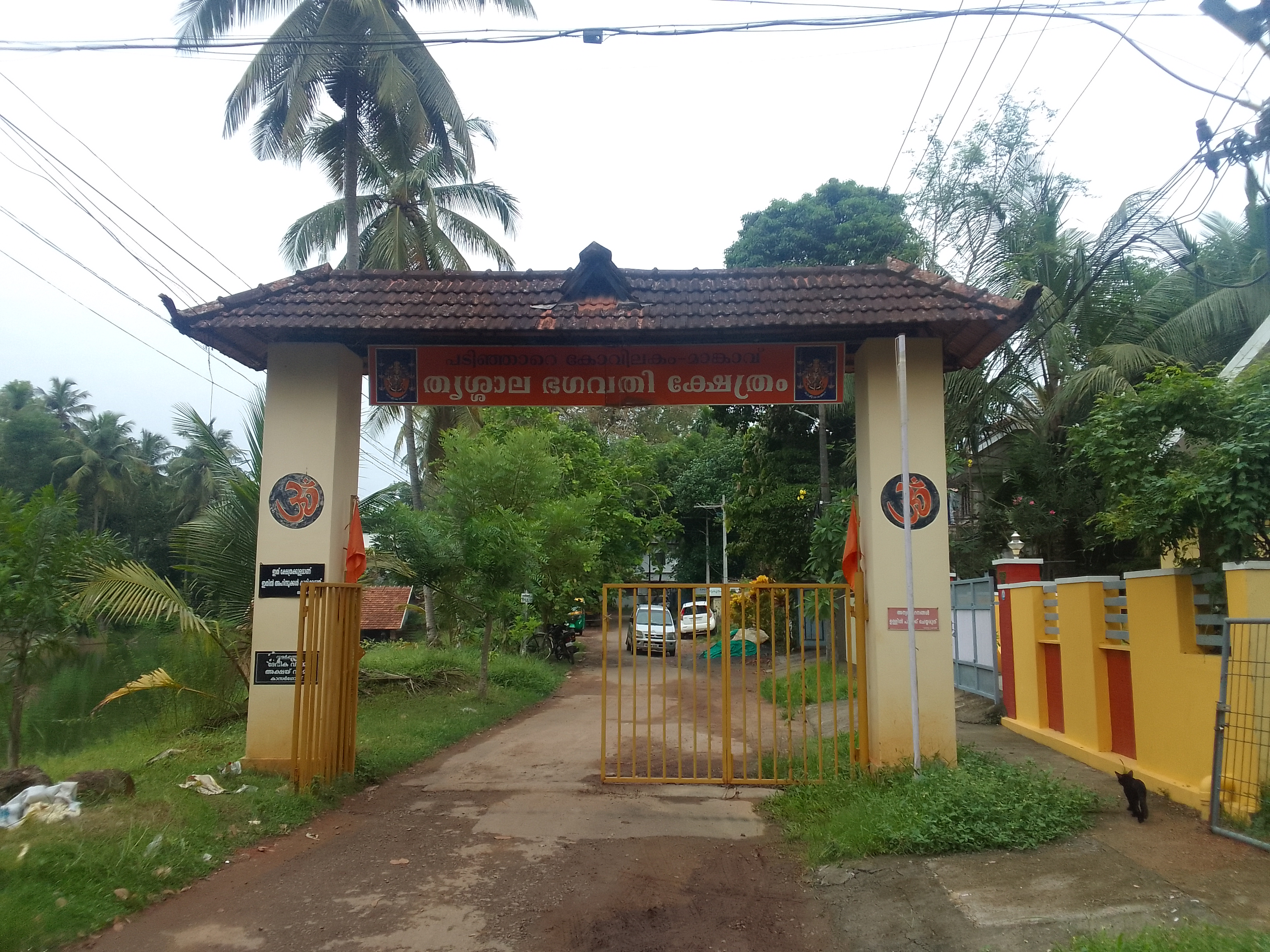
Thrishala Temple

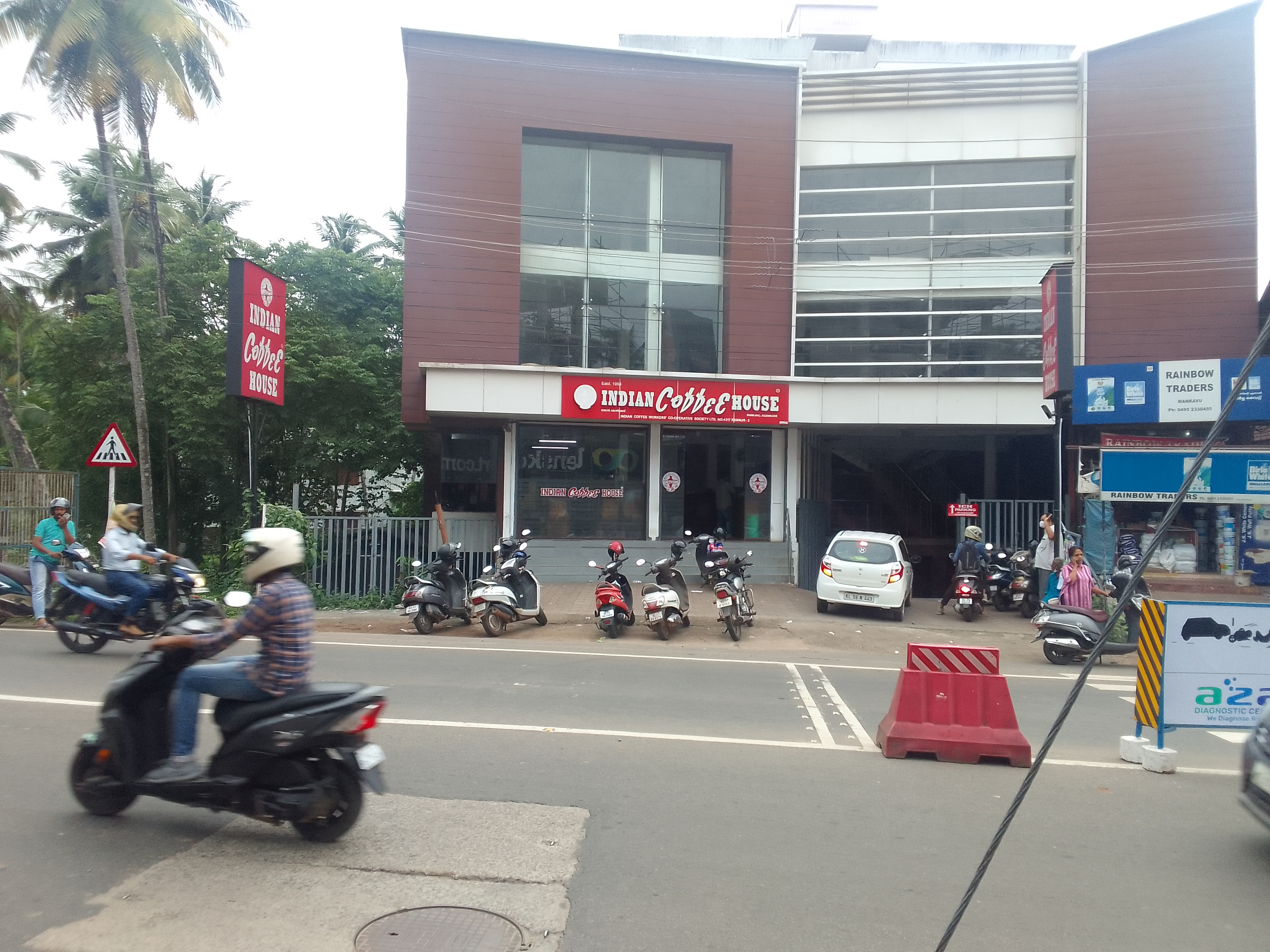
Indian Coffee House

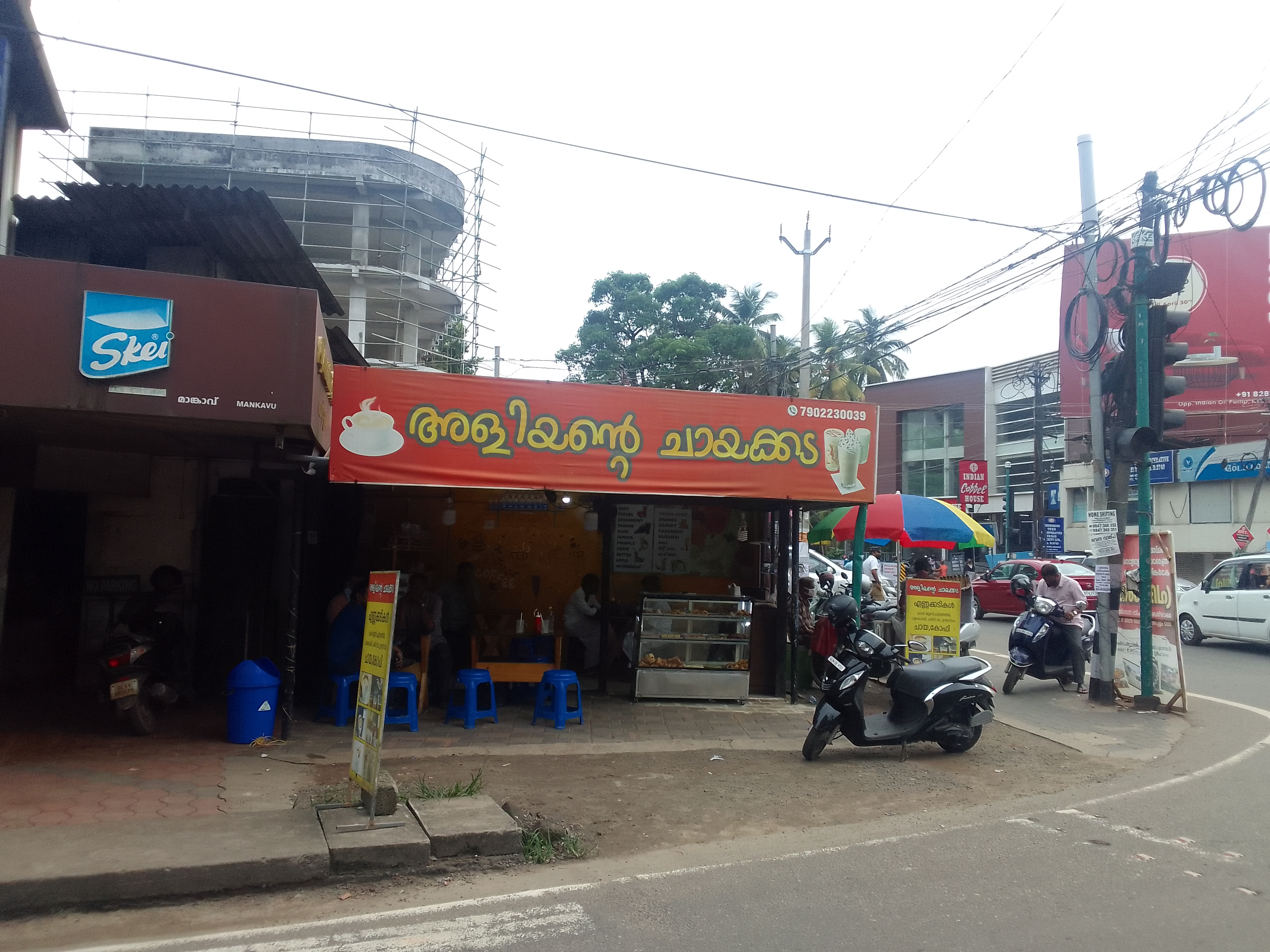
"Brother-in-Law" Coffee Shop

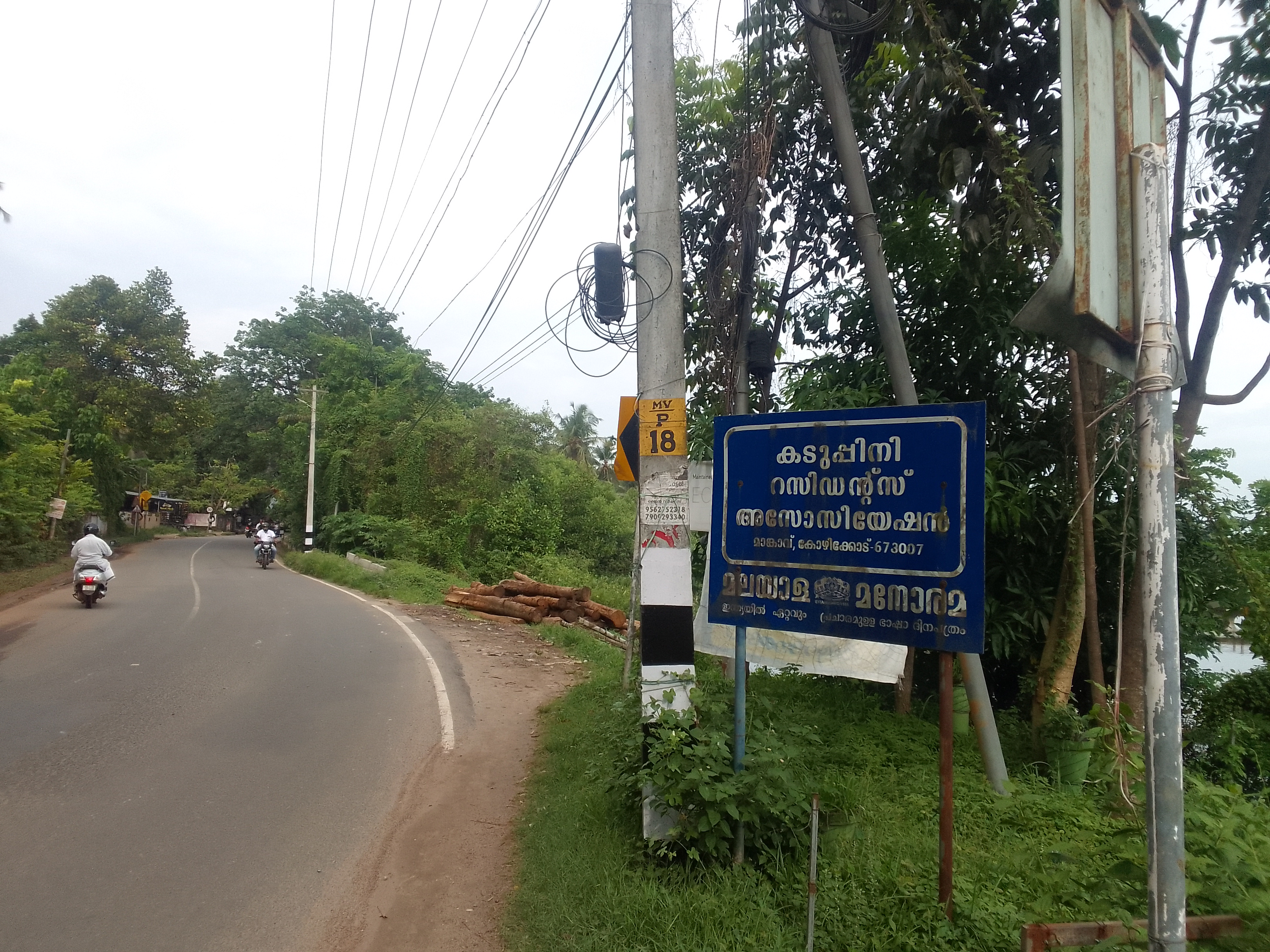
Kaduppini River
