= Krishna Varma =

Prince of Karimpuzha

Krishna Varma Raja was Eralpad or eldest prince of Calicut. He was known as Kishen Varma, Kishen Raja and Prince of Karimpuzha in British records.

== Life ==
Varma rose to power after Hyder Ali's second conquest of Malabar in 1774. Manavikraman Raja of Calicut fled to Travancore and thus his second-in-command Krishna Varma became de facto head of state.

The oppressive Mysore rule pushed Malabar into a state of revolt that lasted throughout the Mysore period (1774 to 1791). The Kingdom of Calicut covered much of South Malabar. Varma and his nephews led resistance. Ravi Varma the Elder and Ravi Varma the Younger were most prominent.

Krishna Varma operated from the traditional seat of Eralpad in Karimpuzha, present Palghat district, commanding a large resistance movement which took the form of guerrilla warfare. His nephew Ravi Varma the Elder acted as Commander In Chief of rebel military force. The rebels foiled all effort of Mysore government to set up a working administration in South Malabar.

In 1788, Varma went in person to Calicut to negotiate peace with Tipu Sultan but eventually decided not to cooperate with Sultan. To escape from Tipu's camp, he agreed to all proposals of Sultan and took a large sum from Tipu as reward, but once he fled to safety of Karimpuzha, he broke his promise and renewed his revolt on a greater scale.

He died in 1793.
