= Thalikkunu Shiva Temple =

Hindu temple in Kerala, India

Thalikkunnu Shiva Temple
- തളിക്കുന്നു ശിവ ക്ഷേത്രം
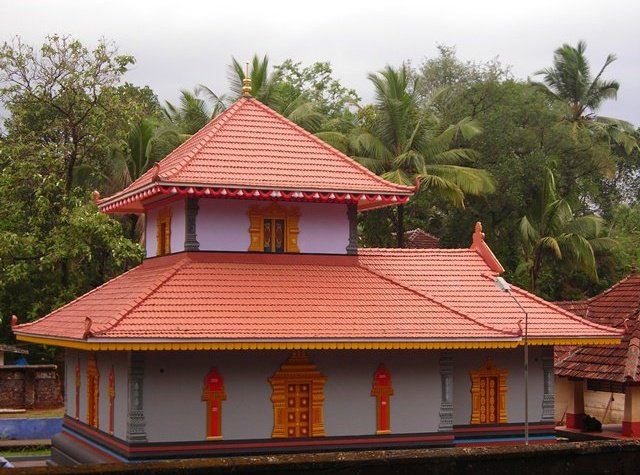
- View of Temple

- Location of Temple

Religion
- Affiliation: Hinduism
- District: Kozhikode district
- Deity: Shiva
- Festival: Maha Shivaratri

Location
- Location: Mankavu
- State: Kerala
- Country: India
- Interactive map of Thalikkunnu Shiva Temple
- Coordinates: 11.2374815°N 75.8094068°E

Architecture
- Type: (Kerala style)
- Completed: Not Known

Website
- www.thalikunnumahasivatemple.in

Thalikkunu Shiva Temple dedicated to Shiva, is situated in Mankave, Kozhikode, Kerala, India.

== History ==
Thalikkunu Shiva Temple is one of the oldest temples of Malabar. This temple has been attacked many times. Currently the Temple is under His Highness Zamorin of Calicut.. Thali, Thiruvannur, Varackal, Puthur, Govindapuram etc. are other important temples in the town of Kozhikode as well as those nearby were completely destroyed as a result of Tipu's military operations. Some of them were reconstructed by the Zamorin after he returned following the defeat of Tipu Sultan in Sreerangapatanam and the Treaty of 1792. According to the Malabar Gazetteer, the following important temples were destroyed by Tippu's Army. Tali Mahadeva Temple, Kozhikode. Sree Valayanadu Bhagavathy Temple, Govindapuram, Calicut. Tiruvannur Siva Temple, Kozhikode.

== Location ==
Thalikkunu Shiva Temple is located in Mankave, Kozhikode, Kerala. The temple is four kilometers from Kozhikode Railway Station and five kilometers from private and KSRTC bus stands.

== Festivals and Celebrations ==
The most important is the Maha Shivaratri which is celebrated on the Krishna Paksha Chaturdashi of Hindu calendar month Maagha as per Amavasya-ant month calculation. As per Poornima-ant month calculation, the day is Krishna Paksha Chaturdashi of Hindu calendar month Phalguna which falls in February or March as per the Gregorian calendar. Of the twelve Shivaratris in the year, the Maha Shivarathri is the most holy. The Maha Shivaratri is Celebrated in grand every year. The celebration included Kazcha Sheeveli accompanied with Elephant, Chuttu Vilakku, Vilakinezhunallippu, Niramala, Maha Ganapati Homam etc. Cultural programs of Children are also conducted along with Prasadam distribution and Annadanam (Lunch) to all the devotees. Year by year the temple is gaining more devotees and developments for a peace and Safe pilgrimage.

== Temple Structure ==
The temple's main sanctum is square in shape facing east. The idol of Lord Shiva is in the form of Linga and decorated with a silver crescent. In front of the main temple there is Namskaramandapam with the idol of Nandi on it. On the southwest corner is the sanctum of Lord Ganapati and Lord Ayyappa. The is one well which is used for temple purpose only inside the complex. Outside is surrounded with pradikshana vazhi and a big banyan tree with idols of Nagam at the outer southwest corner. There is an entry way at all the four sides of the temple complex with road access also from the four sides. However, as the temple is facing east, the east entrance is mainly used.

== Other Deities ==
Lord Ganapathi and Lord Ayyappa are worshiped inside the Ullambalam (inner temple) and Nagaraja is worshiped outside besides a big Banyan Tree.

== Pooja Offerings ==
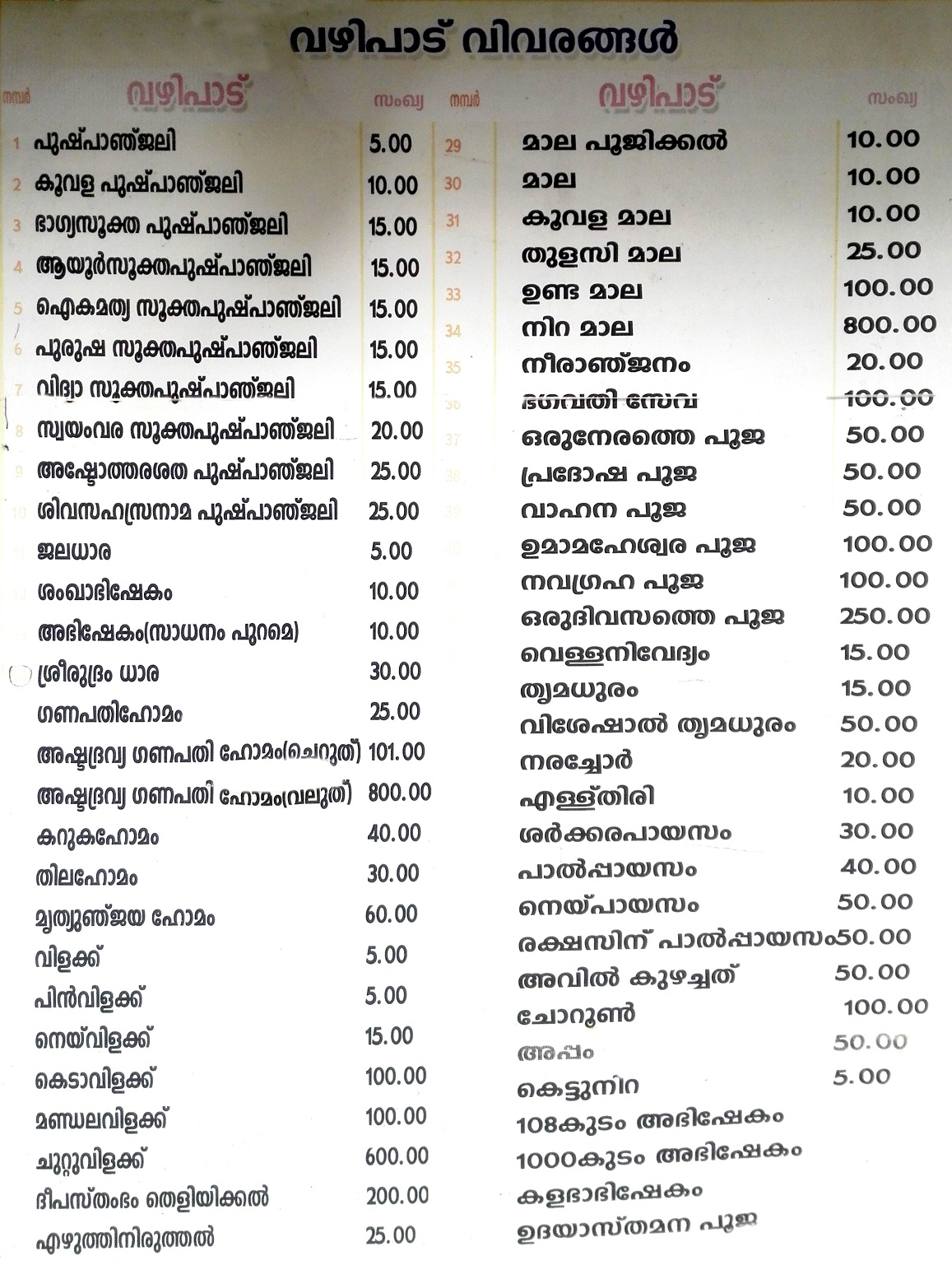
Pooja List

== Renovations and Developments ==
Currently the temple is undergoing renovations and developments under the supervision of the Temple development committee and the Devasom. The main temple was renovated some years back and currently the Chuttambalam is under construction which is likely to be completed soon. The inside pradakshinavari is paving with stone and the Namaskara Mandapam in also having a new face.

== Photo gallery ==
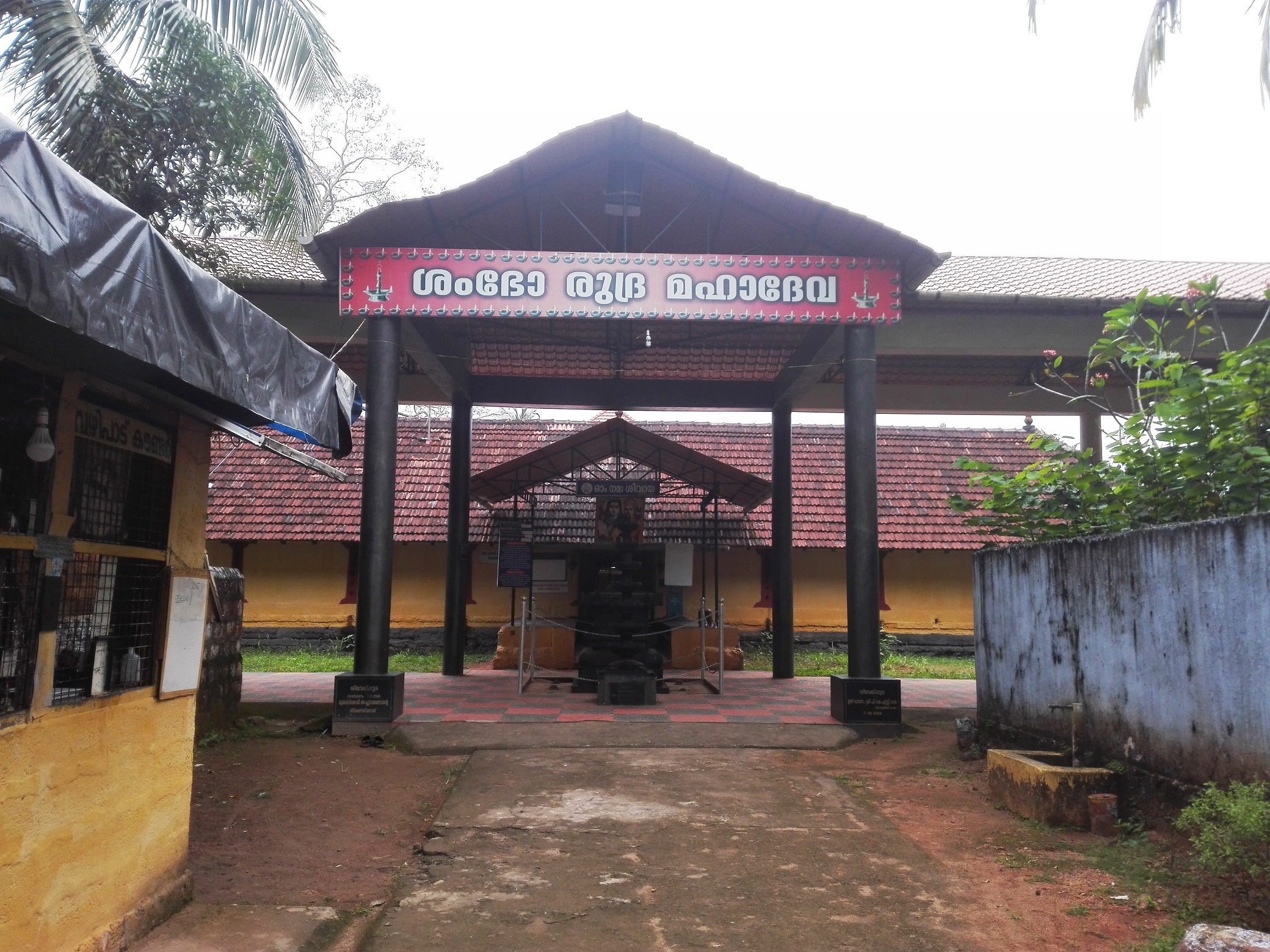
Thalikkunu Shiva Temple Front Side

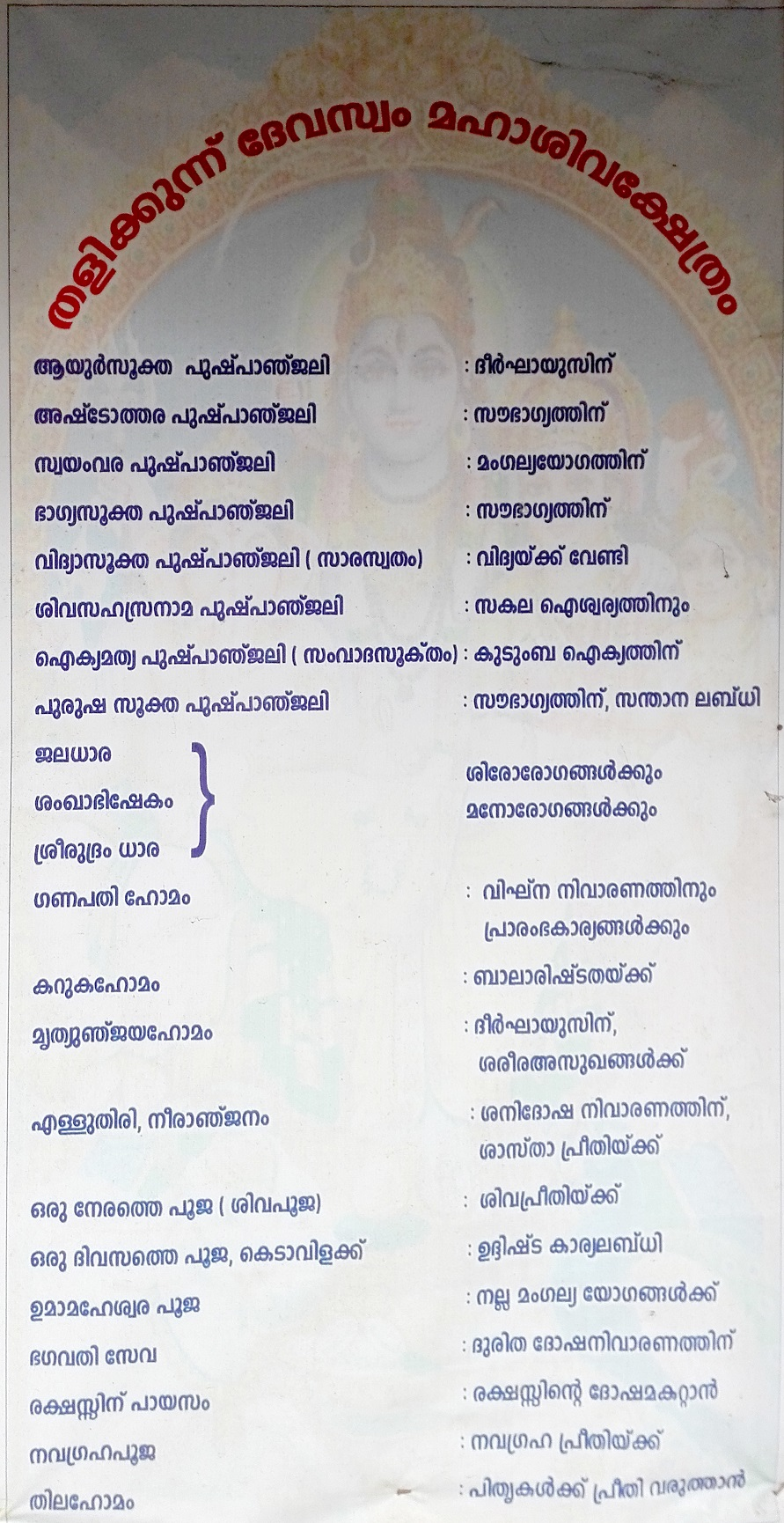
Thalikkunu Shiva Temple Vazhipadu List

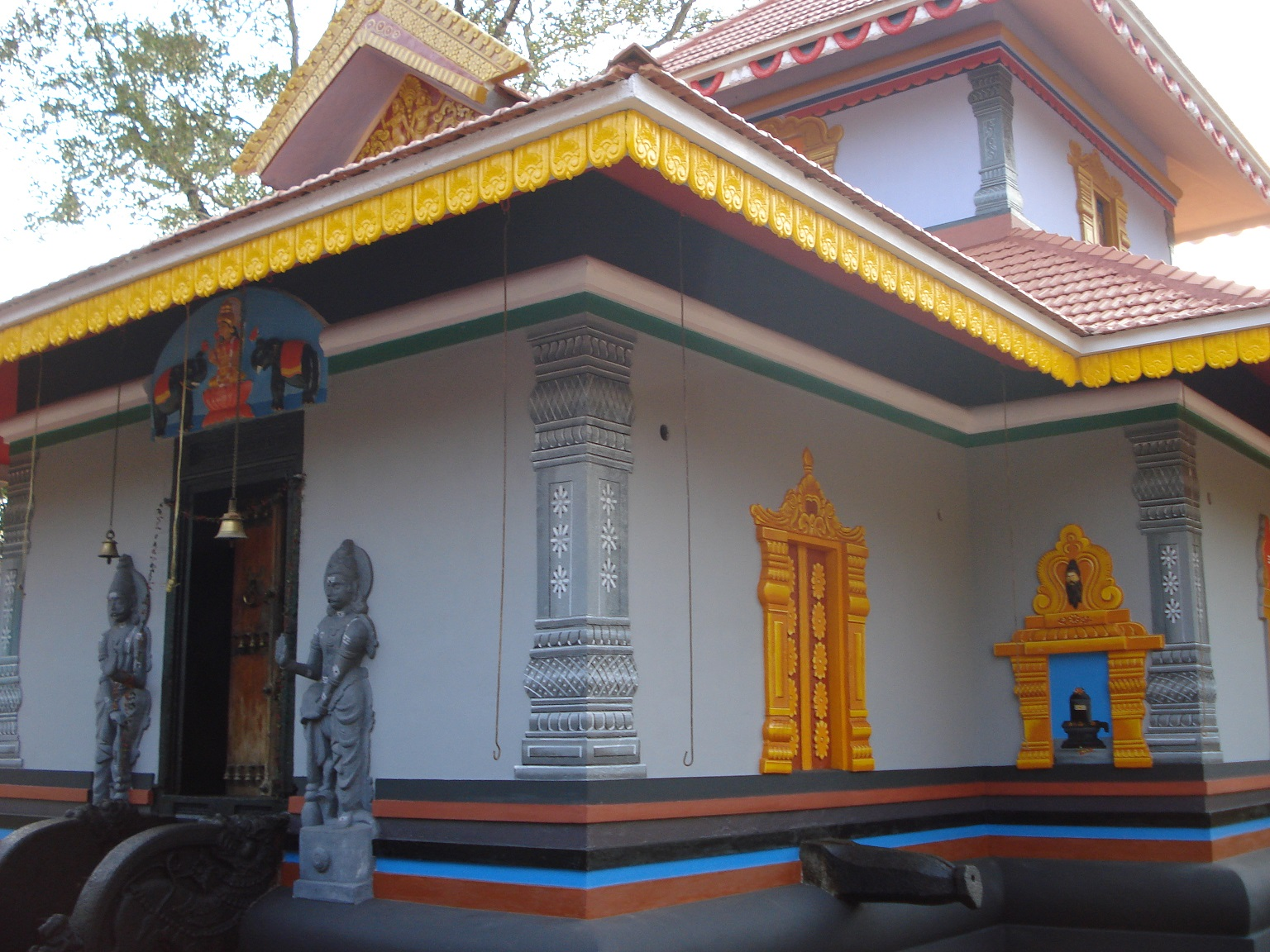
Thalikkunu Shiva Temple Sri Kovil Front View

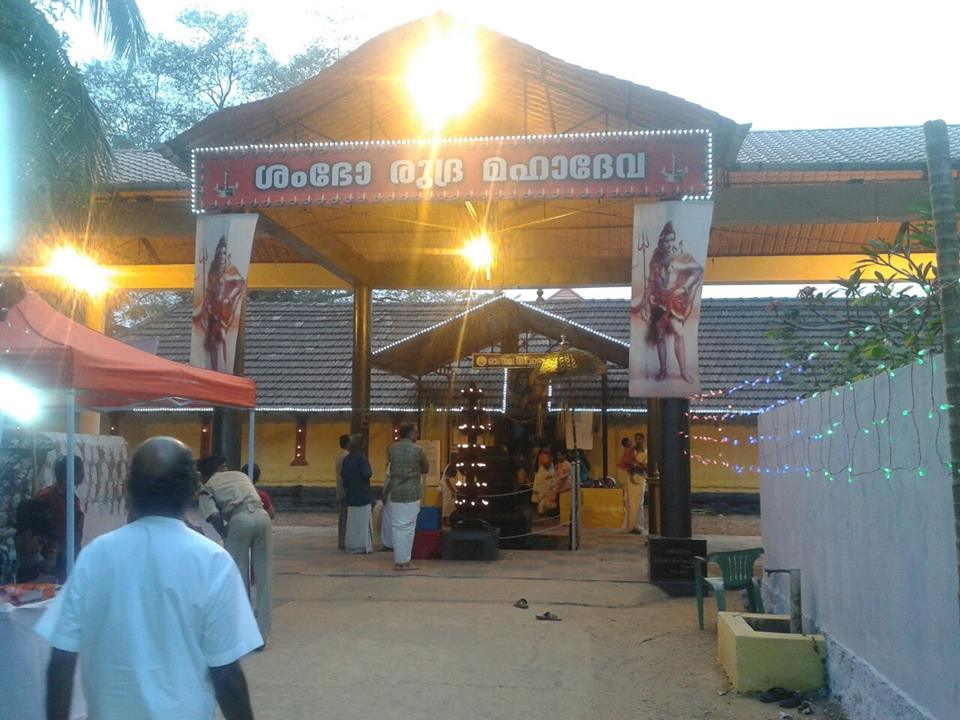
Thalikunnu Shiva temple Front View

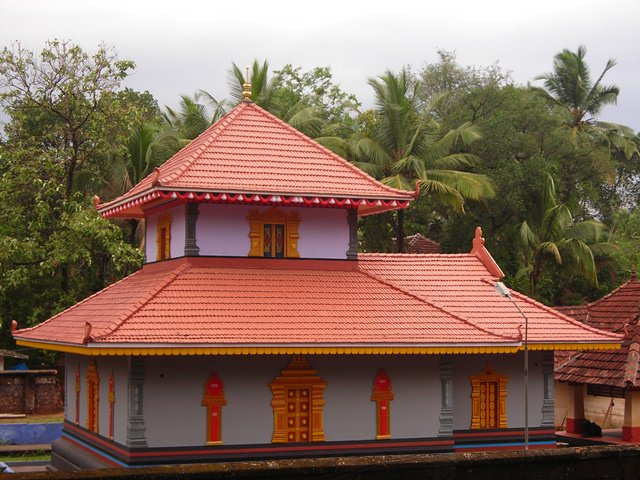
Thalikunnu shiva temple Full View

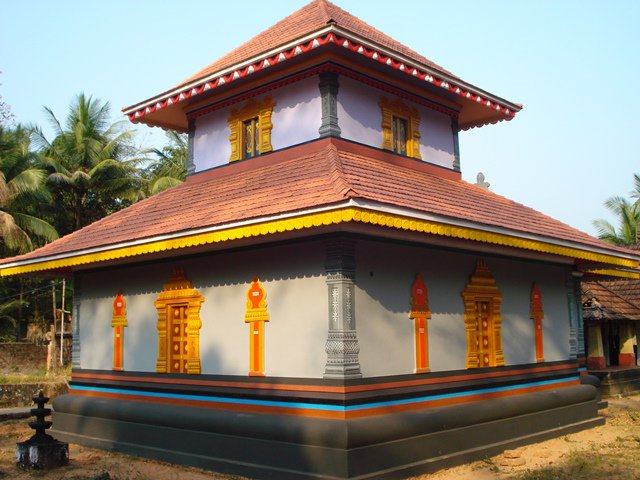
Thalikunnu shiva temple Side

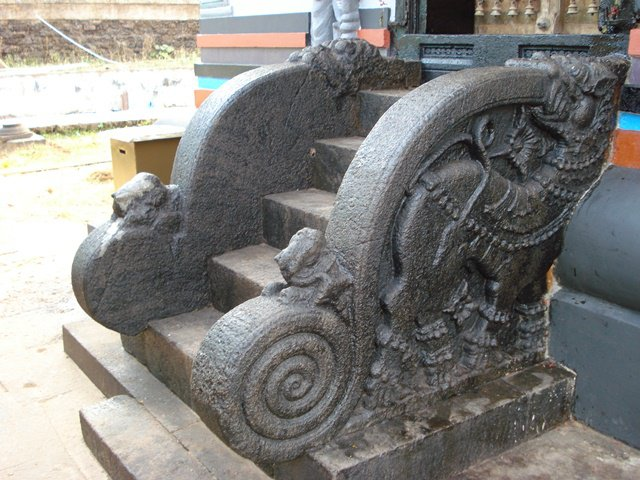
Thalikunnu shiva temple Steps

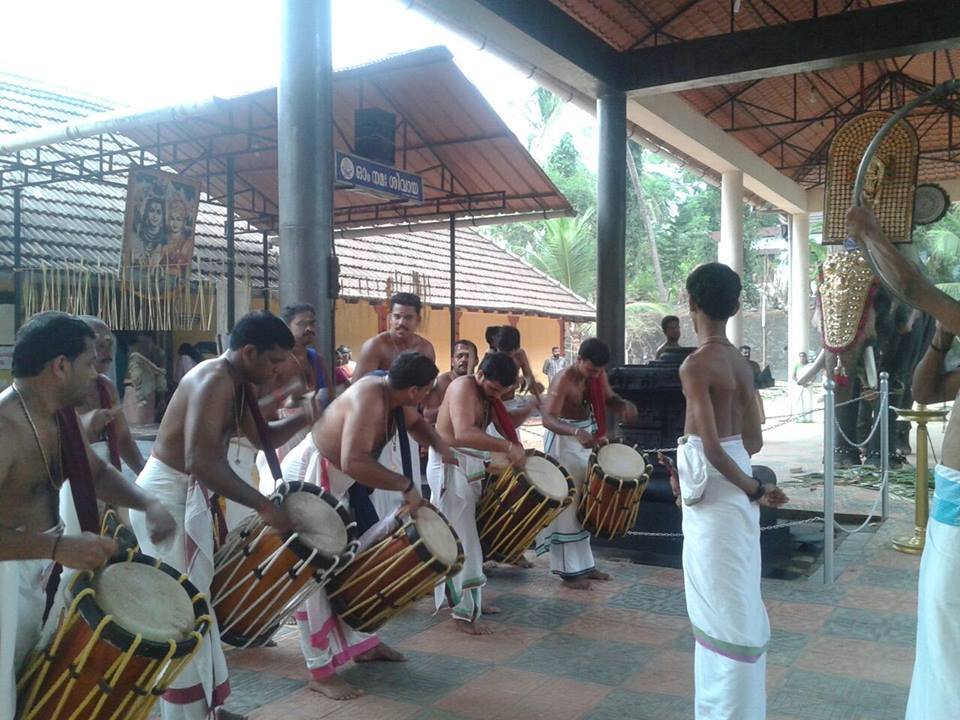
Thalikunnu shiva temple Melam

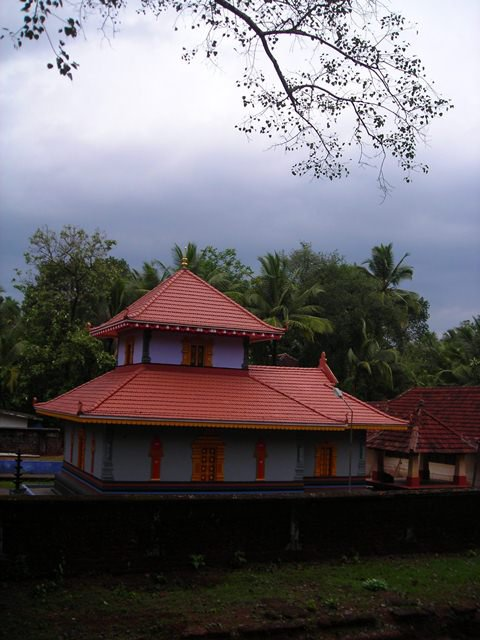
Thalikunnu shiva temple Distant

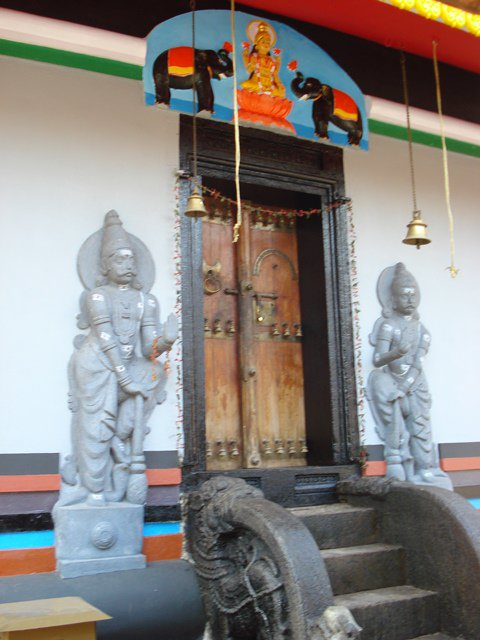
Thalikunnu shiva temple Sreekovil

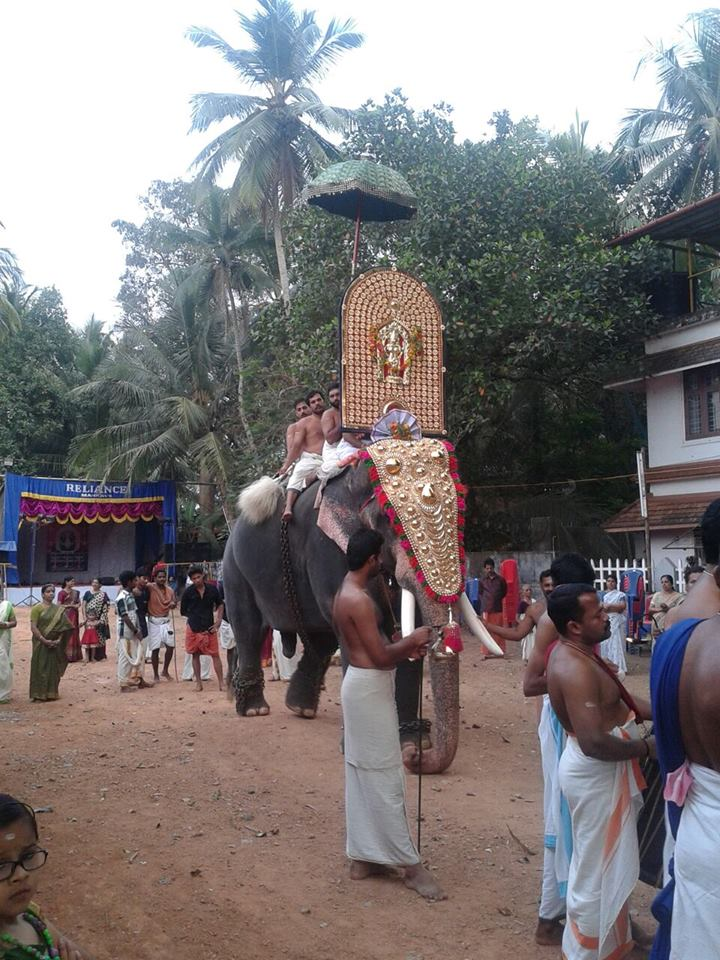
Thalikunnu shiva temple Procession

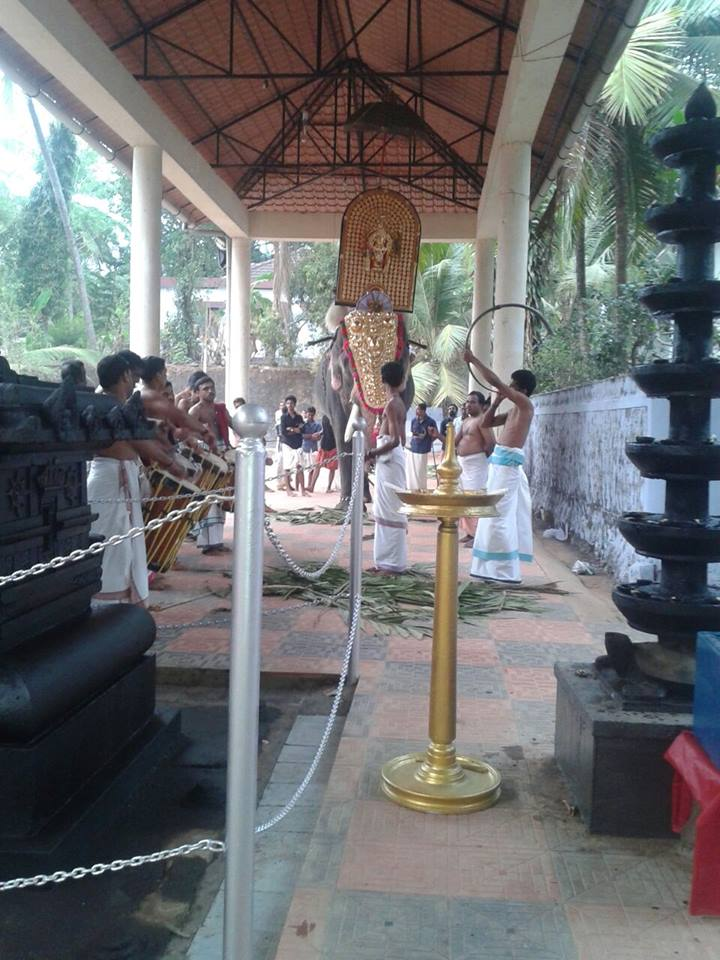
Thalikunnu shiva temple Vilakku

== See also ==
- Vadakkunnathan Temple
- List of Hindu temples in Kerala
- List of Shiva temples in India
