= Menoky =

Nair title in Kerala

Menoky (or Menoki) is a title of Nair in the Indian state of Kerala. The Menoky are one of 14 "high caste" Nayar (there are 4 "low caste" Nair sub-castes), and historically served as administrators and feudal landlords.

"Menoki" (or Menoky) were indeed a group or class of people historically associated with the administrative structure under the Zamorin (Samoothiri) of Calicut in the Malabar region of Kerala. They served as superintendents, handling important duties like overseeing land administration, tax collection, and maintaining law and order on behalf of the Zamorin. This role placed them in a key position within the Zamorin’s governance system, as the rulers relied on local officials for effective management of their territories.

The Zamorin dynasty was a powerful kingdom that played a significant role in the Malabar region, particularly during the medieval period when they were a prominent force in trade, especially in spices. The Menokis, along with other officials, helped maintain the administrative framework necessary to support the kingdom’s economy and governance.
