= Ravi Varma of Padinjare Kovilakam =

Zamorin general (c. 1745–1793)

Ravi Varma
- Born: c. 1745; Mankavu, Calicut
- Died: 1793 (aged 48); Cherpulassery, Palakkad
- House: Padinjare Kovilakam
- Religion: Hinduism

Ravi Varma Raja (c. 1745–1793) was a Samantan Nair warrior prince of the Royal House of Zamorins from Calicut who fought a two-decade long revolt against the Mysore Sultanate under Hyder Ali and Tipu Sultan between 1766–1768 and 1774–1791, and later the British East India Company in 1793.

== Family background ==
Born in the kingdom of Calicut in 1745, Ravi Varma belonged to the Padinjare Kovilakam (Mankavu Palace), of the Zamorins Royal Family (Nediyirippu Swarupam), which had been ruling the Kingdom of Calicut for the last 600 years. The incumbent Raja of this family was popularly referred to as Zamorin or Samoothiri. Unlike his contemporary and friend Pazhassi Raja, the prince-regent of Kottayam, very little is known about the personal lives of Ravi Varma Raja and the other princes of the Padinjare Kovilakam.

== Career ==
Hyder Ali's invasion of Malabar in 1766 was met with stiff opposition by the local Nairs, who led by the Zamorin of Calicut, rose up in rebellion against the oppressive policies implemented by his regime. n 1767, as the Mysorean army edged closer to the outer reaches of Calicut, the Zamorin sent most of his relatives to safe haven in Ponnani and to avoid the humiliation of surrender, committed self-immolation by setting fire to his palace, the Mananchira Kovilakam. His nephew and successor, Kishen Raja continued the war until 1774, when he fled to Travancore.

The Mysorean invasion of Malabar had forced most of the royal Nair households to flee to Travancore, where they were helped to rehabilitate themselves by Dharma Raja. With most of royals in exile, the young princes of Padinjare Kovilakam took charge. Their immediate goal was to oust Mysorean garrisons from Calicut.

The rebellion in the southern Malabar was led by Ravi Varma.

The abrupt end of the 600-year reign of the Zamorins created a leadership vacuum in the kingdom of Calicut, which resulted in the Eralppad (second-in-line successor to the throne) Raja Krishna Varma's assumption of the throne. Together with his nephew Ravi Varma and a small band of Nair warriors, Krishna Varma swore revenge against Hyder Ali and Tipu Sultan. The ensuing insurgency struggle against the Mysorean army lasted until 1791.

Krishna Varma appointed Ravi Varma as the Commander of the armed forces of Calicut and for two decades repeatedly thwarted all efforts by Hyder and Tipu to subjugate his kingdom. Ravi Varma has the distinction of being the first Malabar prince to rise up in 1788 against the forced conversions and deportation of Nairs to Seringapatam conducted by Tipu. He was a key figure in the anti-Mysore uprising in southern Malabar. After 1792, he broke his longstanding alliance with the British, and waged war against them. He was captured by the British in the following year, and died in captivity at Cherpulassery. His nephew, also named Ravi Varma, was also arrested by the British and died in prison the same year.

== Second war with Hyder Ali (1774–1779) ==
In November 1788, the Mysorean forces under Hyder's son Tipu Sultan attacked Calicut and captured the Karanavappad of Manjeri. Their assaults were met with resistance by the Nairs of Calicut and southern Malabar led by Ravi Varma and other princes of the Padinjare Kovilakam. Tipu sent 6,000 troops under his French commander, M. Lally to raise the siege, but failed to defeat Ravi Varma.

== Battle of Tirurangadi ==
In 1790, a British force of 2,000 men under Colonel Hartley landed in South Malabar to deal with Mysore army of 9,000 Sepoys and 4,000 Moplays. Ravi Varma rushed to aid with 5,000 of his best Nairs and that helped to turn tide in favour of British. [Buchanan]

Colonel Hartley in his letter to Governor-General Charles Cornwallis stated that this victory was of decisive importance to British success in Third Anglo-Mysore War.

== War against the British ==
The British offered rewards for information about the whereabouts of Pazhassi Raja (3000 pagodas), Vira Varma Raja (1000 pagodas), and Ravi Varma Raja (1000 pagodas).
