= Dasu Sriramulu =

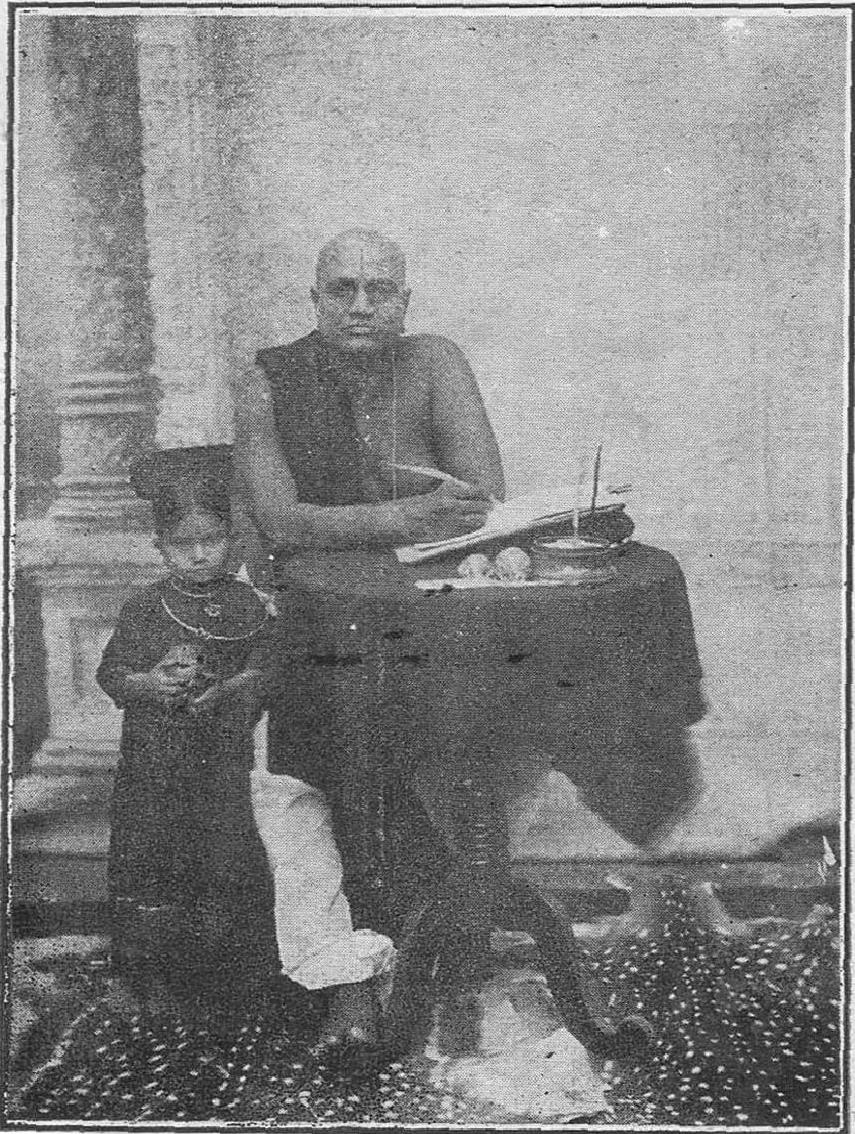
- Born: 8 April 1846; Kurada, Madras Presidency, British India (now in Andhra Pradesh, India)
- Died: 16 May 1908 (aged 62); Eluru, Madras Presidency, British India (now in Andhra Pradesh, India)
- Occupations: Teacher; Advocate; Composer; Playwright; Poet
- Known for: Devi Bhagavatam (Telugu); Telugunadu
- Spouse: Janakamma
- Children: Keshava Rao, Narayana Rao, Govinda Rao, Madhava Rao, Vishnu Rao, Madhusudana Rao, Vemuri Saradamba (daughter)
- Parents: Kannaiah (father); Kamamma (mother)
- Awards: Mahakavi

Mahakavi Dasu Sriramulu (1846–1908) was an Indian scholar, poet, orator, author, astrologer, avadhani, translator, and social reformer. He was a lawyer by profession. He was a child prodigy. He had no formal tutelage in these diverse arts – his knowledge was gained through his personal studies and association with scholars and artists.

== Early life and education ==
He was born on 8 April 1846 in Kuraada village, Krishna District, Madras Presidency (presently the Andhra Pradesh state), India. Sriramulu's parents were Kannayya and Kamamma. He had early education in Sanskrit, Telugu, Vyakarana (grammar) and Scriptures in the traditional manner. He mastered these arts from his close association with exponents in these arts and by natural instinct rather than by formal percept under a guru. In his tenth year he studied Telugu, Sanskrit classical literature and Hindu Astronomy, by his twentieth year attained proficiency in these subjects and after another six years secured a teacher's place. Later he began his English education and qualified for setting up his law practice as 'first grade pleader'. He continued in the profession until 1895. He died in his sixty-second year in his own house at Eluru (Andhra Pradesh) state.

== Literary activity ==
He dominated the literary world in later half of the 19th century. The encyclopaedias of Telugu literature devoted a chapter to Dasu Sriramulu. He devoted himself to the authorship of a number of useful works for the edification of the public on literary, social and miscellaneous subjects. His miscellaneous works in Arithmetic, science of expression and Logic written in Telugu will amply repay perusal. He was a fluent speaker and traveled extensively in the Northern Circars and the Nizam's Dominions for several years, delivering lectures on diverse subjects. He began writing so early in his 12th year and wrote many books in Sanskrit and Telugu. In 1902 his master pieces of literary works both the languages - Andhra Devl Bhagavatam, and Sakuntalam were written He wrote Somalingeswara satakam when he was only 12 years old and Satrajiti Vilasam, a yakshaganam at the age of14 years. Later he wrote kavyalu, Satakas (100 verses), plays, lyrics for musical and dance compositions such as - Krutulu, Javalis, Padams, yakshaganam in Telugu. He translated many satakams and plays from Sanskrit into Telugu.

=== Musical compositions ===
He has around 80 musical compositions with mudra: Dasu Rama to his credit. By the end of 1887 Sriramulu completed 2 volumes of keertanas, swarajitis, tillanas, padams and javalees (different forms of Carnatic music). His keertanas generally had a pallavi (the initial portion of musical composition) and three charanas (stanzas) written in the praise of Vinayaka, Saraswati, Krishna, Rama, Jagadamba and Lakshmi. Sriramulu Padams were dedicated to Thotlavalluru Venugopalaswami. His mudra was "Dasu Rama". The notation was provided by Voleti, Nallanchakravarthula Krishnamacharyulu, and Nookala Chinna Satyanarayana. His musical works were sung by Dwaram Venkataswamy Naidu, Sripada Pinakapani, Voleti Venkataswarulu, Srirangam Gopalaratnam, etc. Pinakapani mentioned that "the grammar of his padams and javalis was perfect. He was among the finest composers in this genre. "Hyderabad brothers (Sri D. Raghavachari, and Sri D. Seshachari), Malladi Brothers, Malladi Suribabu, Voleti Venkateswerlu, Sriramgam Gopalaratnam etc. rendered his compositions in public concerts, at All India Radio national level programmes, television. His compositions were sung by musician Y. Ramaprabha and brought out as CD under the title 'Dasu Sreerama Ganasudha'.

=== Dance compositions ===
The poet, composer Dasu Sriramulu's association with traditional dancers, their patrons (kings, landlords) and devadasis (temple dancers resulted in his treatise Abhinaya Darpanam, padams and javalis. Kuchipudi gurus, and choreographers consulted Sriramulu for their dance performances. Temple dancers performed his compositions and paid public tribute to him. Kuchipudi expert Vedantam Ramalinga Sastry reveals: "Kuchipudi gurus like Bhagavathula Vissaiah were enriched by his inputs." There was a dance programme on his compositions choreographed by Swapnasundari, which was performed by her disciples.

== Social reformer ==
His long time association with Social Reform Movement, enabled him to render meritorious services to a magazine 'Social Reform', in addition to his works on the subject. Sriramulu also started a school in 1886 to help middle school English teacher when he lost his employment on false allegations.

Devadasis dances were arranged during temple festivals and marriages. They were taking his help in learning the lyrics of javalis, padams, music and dance. They were seeking his permission and blessings to perform dances. He wrote these javalis and padams for them and also found a school of music in Eluru appointing teachers.

He was participating in many literary social gatherings, taking his wife along with him, which was against the social customs during his time. He taught music to his daughter Saradamba, - a taboo in those days. He allowed his daughter to give concerts also. His daughter's education became hindrance to her wedding as per then social norms, even though he followed liberal practices in his son's marriages. He did not follow meaningless social injunctions set in the name of tradition and customs. He wrote ‘mundan khandana’ opposing the religious practice of shaving the heads of widows and wrote articles like ‘duracaara pisaach bhaMjani’, condemning these evil practices. To propagate the correct views on traditions and started a monthly journal ‘analpa jalpita kalpavalli’ to propagate the correct views on traditions.

== Personal life ==
Sriramulu married Janakamma at the age of his 13. They had six sons and a daughter. They are - Kesava Rao, Narayana Rao, Madhava Rao, Govinda Rao, Vishnu Rao, Madhusudhana Rao and daughter Saradamba, whom he taught Sanskrit and music. His second son Narayana Rao wrote 'Sri Sangitarasatarangini Anu Buddha Natakamu' left it in the middle of 3rd chapter and expired in 1905, which was later completed by Sriramulu. His fifth son Vishnu Rao wrote 'Dasuvari vamsa charitra (Family History) and Dasuvari vamsa vruksham (Family tree)'. Sriramulu educated his daughter Vemuri (Dasu) Saradamba. She learnt Telugu, Sanskrit, playing Veena (a musical instrument) at the very early age and began writing poems and also giving concerts in a far places like Mysore. She had written Nagnajiti parinayam (a kavyam) and Madhava satakamu of 100 verses at the age of 11 years. She survived only for 19 years.

== Legacy ==
Sriramulu died on May 16, 1908. Most of his works were lost. In this centenary year, an effort was made to restore his legacy. Mahakavi Dasu Sriramulu smaraka samithi had been undertaking the mission to resurrect this forgotten genius, who was hailed by scholars as ‘second Srinadha’ and restore on the pedestal that he richly deserves. Dasu Sriramulu's descendants formed Dasu Sriramulu Smaraka Samithi in 1973 in Hyderabad, India. The samiti retrieved and also published his works. A doctoral work on his musical compositions was done by his great-granddaughter V. Vaidehi and the thesis was also published as book 'Mahakavi Dasu Sriramulu Gari Kruthulu Oka Sameeksha' in 2013.

Many public libraries and academies included his portrait in their gallery of greats for his service to music and theatre. Book release functions were organized by Samithi.

To commemorate his 150th birthday, All India Radio broadcast a talk on Mahakavi “A multifaceted glory of Dasu Sriramulu”.

To mark the death centenary of Srirama kavi, the department of culture had set the rolling long programmes for the year. `Sri Dasu Srirama Kavi Saraswata Vaibhavam' was organised on the last day of the `Sahiti Saptaham' of `Sataroopa' festival of the Department of Culture and State Cultural Council. Presiding over the function Dharmavarapu Subrahmanyam, the chairman suggested holding a `Dasu Sriramulu Day' every year and conduct seminars and programmes under the aegis of Cultural Council. Acharya Bethavolu Ramabrahmam, Vakula Bharanam Ramakrishna, journalist Potturi Venkateswara Rao, Dwa.Na.Sastry etc. spoke on the versatile genius of Sriramalu.

== Bibliography ==
1. Abhinava gadya prabandhamu (Written in 1893 and published in 1974)
2. Analpa Jalpitaa Kalpa Kalpa Vallee (Journal published in 1880).
3. Chakkatla danda (Satakamu published in 1930 and 2nd edition in 1984)
4. Durachara Pisacha Bhanjani (3 booklets: were published together as a single book in 1991 - Durachara Pisacha Bhanjani (1890); Achara Nirukti (1890); and Vigraharadhana Taravali, a composition of 27 poems. Durachara Pisacha Bhanjani and Achara Nirukti were written condemning the prevailing social evils. Vigraharadhana Taravali detailing the spiritual meaning of idol worship as a response to its critics.
5. Krutulu, Padamulu, Jaavaleelu (2007) with notation. Sriramulu wrote several padams and javalis for devadasis, who were performing Bharatanatyam in temples. In 1991 a book was published including only javalis and padams and released by Sripada Pinakapani. Later the comprehensive book was published in 2007 including keertanas, swarajitis, tillanas, padams javalees and magalaharatulu with notation provided by scholars in music and dance forms.
6. Kuranga Gouri Shankara Natika (Play published in 1981)
7. Patitha Samasrli Prayaschitta Vishayakopanyasamu (1891)
8. Prayavchitta nirnayamu (1867)
9. Sri Andhra Devi Bhagavatham (First published in 1907, The second edition of the book was published in 1928 and 3rd ed.in 1978). This is his magnum opus and Telugu translation of Devi Bhagavatham. Prior to him only 2 scholars translated this verse - Mulugu Papayaradhya (18th century poet) and Tirupati Venkata Kavulu in 1896. This work involving 6000 poems was completed only in six months. Devi Bhagavatham, was widely read in homes, temples and religious gatherings.
10. Sri Abhijnana Sakumtalamu (1898): This was the translated version of Sanskrit play of Kalidasa into Telugu by Sriramulu. He translated this Sanskrit drama on the request of BA (undergraduate) students into Telugu language within 20 days.
11. Sri Brungaraju Mahimamu, Shraddha Samshaya Vichedi (Written in 1906 and published in 1989). This booklet was translated from Sanskrit, detailing the characteristics of a medicinal plant namely 'Brungaraju' (Eclipta prostrata) Guntagalagura (in Telugu) and the preparation of Ayurvedic medicine. It was explained by Adinada Siddha to Navanada Siddhu.
12. Sangitarasatarangini, anu Buddha Natakamu(1907) This play was written by his second son Dasu Narayana Rao, who had left in the middle of 3rd chapter and deceased in 1905. Sriramulu completed the literary work in 1907. It is adopted from The Light of Asia by Edwin Arnold.
13. Sri Surya Satakamu (First published in 1902 and 2nd ed in 1979). This Satakamu of 100 verses originally written by Mayura kavi in Sanskrit, was translated into Telugu by Sriramulu.
14. Telugunadu (First published was in 1899. The 6th edition in 1974). Sriramulu began writing in 1892 to describe about various castes and sects in Telugu region. In the first part, he wrote about Brahmin sects and could not complete the remaining.

=== Literary works on Mahakavi ===
1. Bahumukha prajnasali Mahakavi Dasu Sriramulu (1975): The booklet was written by Dasu Atchuta Rao and published on the occasion of 1st Telugu World Conference, held in Hyderabad in 1975.
2. Mahakavi Dasu Sriramulu Jayanthi Sanchika (A special issue published in April 1973) as a tribute to Sriramulu mahakavi on the occasion of his 100th birthday, compiling the articles written by other scholars.
3. Mahakavi Dasu Sriramulu Gari Kruthulu Oka Sameeksha (The doctoral thesis of V.Vaidehi on Dasu Sriramulu Kruthulu, which was Published as book in 2013)
4. Complete story of genealogy of Dasu family, by Dasu Harinarayana. He compiled in 2018.

The following literary works of Dasu Sriramulu are unavailable.

1. Abhinaya Darpanamu (A treatise on music and dance)
2. Abhinava Koumudi (A treatise on music and dance)
3. Chilakulakoliki Satakamu (Satakamu, 100 verses)
4. Gollapalli Raghunaadha Satakamu (1865- Satakamu 100 verses)
5. Janaki Parinayam (Play of Rambadhra Dikshit - Translated from Sanskrit into Telugu). Serialized in a literary journal of his time –“Saraswati”.
6. Kamakshi satakamu (Satakamu, 100 verses)
7. Krishnarjuna Samaram (1861) Kavyam
8. Lakshana vilasamu (Yakshaganamu) (1876, narrative of a romantic tiff between Krishna and Lakshana)
9. Malatimadhveeyanatakamu, (Play of Bhavabhuti - Translated from Sanskrit into Telugu in 1900). It was also serialized in a literary journal of his time –“Manjulavani”.
10. Malavikagnimitra natakamu (Play)
11. Mahavira charitra natakamu (Play in 1901)
12. Manjari madhukareeyamu
13. Manolakshmi vilasamu, (Play in 1890)
14. Mudrarakshasa natakamu (Play in 1901)
15. Muddugumma Satakamu (Satakamu 1901)
16. Namaskaravidhi Deepika (1897 to 1907)
17. Noukayanamu
18. Pancha Nrusimha Khetra mahatyamu leka Vedachala mahatyam (Kavyam in 1866)
19. Paschatya vidya prasamsa
20. Punarvivaha vicharana
21. Ratnavali (Play)
22. Satrajiti Vilasamu (Yakshaganamu,1860)
23. Seetakalyana natakamu (Play)
24. Somalingeswara satakam (1857)
25. Sourasangrahaganitamu (1867)
26. Tarka koumudi anu nyayabodha grandhamu (1899)
27. Trimatamulu
28. Uttararamayana charitra natakamu (Play)
29. Vaisyadharma deepika (1896)
30. Victoria dvatrinsati
31. Yakshaganam Samvarnopakhyanamu (Yakshaganam)
