= Music of Andhra Pradesh =

There were eminent mridangam artists like "Mrudanga Kesari" Mullapudi Lakshmana Rao and his son Mullapudi Sri Rama Murty. And his disciple " Mrudanga Shiromani" Dharmala Rama Murty and his son Dharmala Venkateshwara Rao. There were other legends like ML Lakshminarayana Raju and Kamalakara Rao.

== Classical music ==
The major composers like Annamacharya, Tyagaraja, Bhadrachala Ramadas, Kshetrayya, Bhuloka tsapa chutti (One who carpeted the Earth) Bobbili Keshavayya, Karvetinagaram composers like Govindasamayya and Sarangapani were pioneers in the field of Carnatic music. In the area of instrumental music, giants such as Dwaram Venkataswamy Naidu (violin), Emani Sankara Sastry (veena), Sheik Chinna Moulana (Nadaswaram), and Chitti Babu (veena) are famous. Contemporary stalwarts of Vocal music include Voleti Venkatesvarulu, Mangalampalli Balamuralikrishna, Nedunuri Krishnamurthy, Dwaram Bhavanarayana Rao, Srirangam Gopalaratnam, Sripada Pinakapani, Nookala Chinna Satyanarayana, Lalita & Haripriya, D. Raghavachary & Seshachary, Dr. Dwaram Lakshmi, Manda Sudharani, Parthasarathy N. Ch, and Dr. Dwaram Tyagaraj. Also Yella Venkatesara Rao, Patri Satish Kumar (mridangam), Pantula Rama, U. Srinivas (mandolin), D. Srinivas (veena), Tirupati Srivani Yalla (veena), Marella Kesava Rao, Ivaturi Vijayeshwara Rao, Akella Mallikarjuna Sharma, and Avasarala Kanyakumari (Violin) are some of the eminent instrumentalists from Andhra Pradesh.

== Film music ==
Susarla Dakshinamurthi, Parupalli Ramakrishnaiah Pantulu, Ogirala Ramachandra Rao, Pithapuram Nageswara Rao, Tanguturi Suryakumari, and Mangalampalli Balamuralikrishna are one of the influential music composers of south Indian cinema. Music composers such as Pendyala Nageswara Rao, R. Sudarshanam, and R. Goverdhanam duo made contribution to folklore and mythological films. Madhavapeddi Satyam, P. Adinarayana Rao, Gali Penchala Narasimha Rao, Satyam, P. B. Sreenivas, S. P. Kodandapani, G. K. Venkatesh, S. Hanumantha Rao, have contributed their work extensively for films with social relevance themes. Ghantasala, S. P. Balasubrahmanyam, P. Susheela, S. Janaki, M. M. Keeravani, Ramesh Naidu etc., are some of the musicians and playback singers from Andhra Pradesh to receive National recognition. R. P. Patnaik is the current president of Andhra Pradesh Cine Music Association.

Other prominent Telugu film score and soundtrack composers of the present include K. Chakravarthy, Raj–Koti, Mani Sharma, Devi Sri Prasad, Mickey J Meyer, Ramana Gogula, R. P. Patnaik, Chakri (music director), Kalyani Malik, S. Thaman, S. V. Krishna Reddy, Vandemataram Srinivas, and Sri Kommineni.
