= Saraswati Vidyardhi =

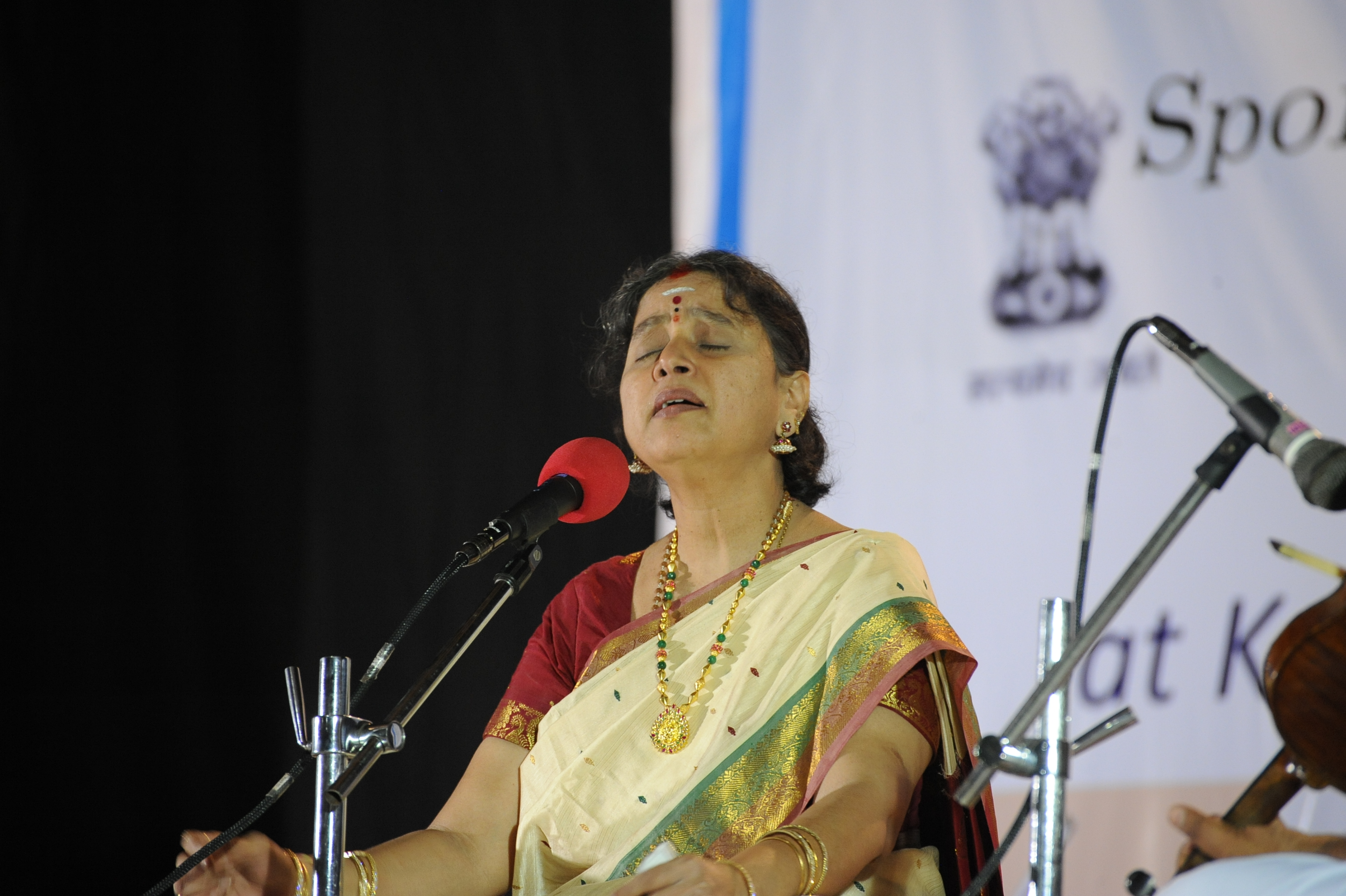

Background information
- Born: 1 May 1963 (age 63)
- Origin: India
- Genres: Carnatic music, Indian classical music
- Occupations: Vocalist; educator

Saraswati Vidyardhi (born 1 May 1963) is a Carnatic vocalist, composer, and academic. She has performed in India and internationally, and her compositions in Carnatic music include Varnams, Krithis, and Sankeerthanas.

She has won critical acclaim for her intensive research in Anumandra sthai (octave). She is capable of singing notes below the mandra shadjam.

== Early life and training ==
Vidyardhi was born in Kolkata into a family of musicians. She had basic musical training from her father Sri I V L Sastry, the founder of Sangeetha Janakulam, a music school offering free coaching. She later became the disciple of Sri Ivaturi Vijayeswara Rao, a versatile musician of good repute. Vidyardhi has been under the tutelage of Dr. Nedunuri Krishnamurthy for over two decades.

== Performances ==
Vidyardhi has performed at various festivals and venues across India in all major cities under the aegis of various Sabhas including The Music Academy, Sri Krishna Gana Sabha, Mudra, and Sri Shanmukhananda. She has also performed for the Spirit of Unity Concerts for National Integration and All India Radio's Sangeet Sammelan.

== Academics ==
Vidyardhi holds an MA in Music from Andhra University. She was awarded a PhD in Music for her thesis, "The Unique Style and Personality of 'Padmabhushan', 'Sangita Kalanidhi' Dr Sripada Pinakapani."

Vidyardhi served as the chairperson of the Board of Studies at Andhra University from 2008 to 2014. She served as a selection committee member for several universities including Rajiv Gandhi University of Knowledge Technologies, Sri Padmavathi Mahila Visvavidyalayam, and Andhra University. At present, she is a professor and Head in the Department of Music at Andhra University and has been guiding research scholars for over a decade.

=== Research articles ===
Vidyardhi has authored sixteen research papers and presented ten of them at various national and international seminars and conferences on music. Eight of her research papers have been published in reputed music journals, including the Journal of The Music Academy. She has chaired sessions music conferences and was a resource officer at several workshops. She has given many lecture-demonstrations on Carnatic music.

== Media ==
=== Books ===
Vidyardhi has authored two books: Taana Deepika and The Unique Style and Personality of Dr Sripada Pinakapani. She co-authored two books with her father Sri I V L Sastry: Sri Tyagaraja Ghanaraga Pancharatna Krithimala and Sankeerthana Ratnavali. Her unpublished works include the books Sankeerthana Ratnakaram, Simhagiri Sankeerthanas and Apuroopa Varnamritham.

=== CDs ===
Vidyardhi, with her daughter, covered Dr Sripada Pinakapani's Varnams on the CD Varnamritham (2006). In 2006 she also released Karnamritham, a CD of her own original devotional music. Her other CDs include Nadamritham (2009), a 2-hour concert in two discs, and Annamayya Sangeetha Sourabham (2012), forty of the 15th-century saint Annamacharya's compositions set to tunes by Pinakapani, which was released on the occasion of Pinakapani's 100th birthday.

== Awards ==
- AIR Music Competition prize, Classical Vocals (1984)
- Gold medal of the Visakha Music Academy (1984)
- Gold medal – Ragam Tanam Pallavi Competition (1992)
- Gold medal – Doorvasula Bhagavanlu Memorial (1992)
- Outstanding Young Artiste Award from Jaycees (1992)
- Outstanding Young Artiste Award from Visakha Music Academy (1997)
- Top Grade in Carnatic Music from Prasar Bharathi Broadcasting Corporation of India, New Delhi (2008)
- "Bharata Ratna Dr. M. S. Subbulakshmi Sangeetha Pracharya Award" from Shanmukhananda Sabha, Mumbai (2023) [1] [2]
- Kala Ratna from the Government of Andhra Pradesh [1]

== Personal life ==
Saraswati is married to K Eswara Chandra Vidyardhi and has a daughter, Lahari Kolachela.
