= Malladi Suribabu =

- Born: 1 May 1945 (age 81); Dubacherla, West Godavari, Andhra Pradesh, British India
- Origin: India
- Genres: Indian classical music, Carnatic music
- Occupation: Classical Vocalist
- Years active: 1963–present
- Labels: Lahari Music; Swathi Soft Solutions; Kosmik

Malladi Suribabu (born 1 May 1945) is an Indian Carnatic vocalist and musician from Vijayawada, India. He was conferred with Kala Ratna, a civilian honor by the Government of Andhra Pradesh in 2013 and TTK Award by Madras Music Academy in 2014. He is a disciple of Voleti Venkateshwarulu, Sripada Pinakapani and Nedunuri Krishnamurthy.

== Early life ==
Suribabu was born on 1 May 1945 in Dubacherla, a village in West Godavari district, Andhra Pradesh, in then British India. He is the father of vocalist duo Malladi Brothers. and vocalist Malladi Vasavi.

His father developed a taste for the traditional way of singing and being a music analyzer and enthusiast, was keen to pass on tradition to his children. Suribabu has developed an aptitude for music from his father and at the age of 9 years, he could easily reproduce songs with perfection.

== Career ==
In 1963, Suribabu made his debut with All India Radio (AIR) children's musical fest and got a high rating from listeners then. In 1971, he joined All India Radio as a program announcer and served for more than 35 years.

While working in AIR, he received the opportunity to work with many legendary artist, including Voleti Venkateswarulu, whom he considers as Guru and learnt rare Kirthanas from him. He also conducted two most successful programs namely Bhakti Ranjani and Sangeeta Sikshana with All India Radio, Vijayawada.

T. R. Subramaniam released a CD of Malladi Suribabu and Malladi Narayanaswami. This was followed by group renderings of songs of Annamacharya and Bhadrachala Ramadas in 2008.

He also performed for The Trinity and Other Vaggeyakara Music Festival held at Bengaluru in April 2012.

Till date, he is actively engaged in music concerts in India and overseas. He has composed over 2, 5000 songs of Bhakta Ramadasu, Annamacharya and Narayana Teertha's Krishna Leela Tarangam, produced several CDs to propagate rich tradition of music.

=== Works ===
- Taranga Bodhana (Narayana Teertha's Tarangam teaching)
- Sadasiva Brahmendra Keerthanas (Sarvam Bhrahmam)
- Amrutha Varshini (CD of Telugu Gazals)
- Bhajare Sriramam (Ramadasu Keerthanas)
- Sangeetha Sikshana

== Albums ==
Year	Album	Artist(s)	Label
2006	Navagraha Krithimala	Malladi Suribabu	Kosmik
2011	Annamacharya Keerthanas	Malladi Suribabu	Swathi Soft Solutions
2014	Karnatic Classical Vocal	Malladi Suribabu	Lahari Music

== Bibliography ==
- R. K. Narayan; Malladi Suribabu (1962). Prayojakudu. M. Sesacalam, Madras (National Library of India).
- Malladi Suribabu (1977). "Jīvanasarvasvaṃ" (in Telugu). Navabharat Buk Haus: 140. OCLC 76579054.
- Malladi Suribabu (1975). "Līlā Manōharaṃ" (in Telugu). Navabhārat Buk Haus: 138. OCLC 76579060.
- Varadarāmadāsu; Malladi Suribabu (2012). "Bhadrachala Ramadasu Keerthanalu" (in Telugu). Sama Gana Lahari Cultural Trust: 130. OCLC 793080706.

== Awards, titles and recognition ==
- Sangeet Natak Akademi Award 2018
- Akashawani Annual Awards, 1984, 1996, 2001 & 2004
- Sapthagiri Sangeetha Vidwanmani, at the 70th Sri Thyagaraja Festival of Music and Dance, 2012
- Tyaga Bhrahma Nada Ratna by Nada Sudha Chennai, 2012
- Kanchi Paramacharya Music Award by Shanmukhananda Sabha, Mumbai
- Kala Ratna award by the Government of Andhra Pradesh, 2013
- Sri Kalaprapoorna title by Sri Annamacharya Project of North America (SAPNA), 2013
- TTK Award, by Madras Music Academy, 2014

== See also ==
- Malladi Brothers
- List of Carnatic artists
- List of people from Andhra Pradesh
