= Bombay Sisters =

Indian Carnatic music singing duo

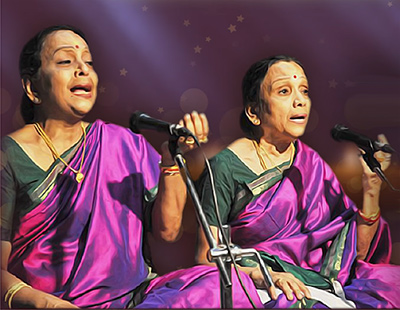

Background information
- Born: C. Saroja; 7 December 1936 (age 89); Trichur, Kingdom of Cochin, British India; C. Lalitha; 26 August 1938; Trichur, Kingdom of Cochin, British India
- Died: C. Lalitha; 31 January 2023 (aged 84); Chennai, India
- Genre: Carnatic music
- Education: Delhi University
- Awards: Padma Shri (2020); Sangita Kalanidhi (2010); Sangeet Natak Akademi Award (2004)

The Bombay Sisters, C. Saroja (born 7 December 1936) and C. Lalitha (26 August 1938 – 31 January 2023), were an Indian Carnatic music singing duo. They received the Padma Shri, India's fourth highest civilian honour, in 2020.

== Filmography ==
1. Yar Jambulingam (Aadi Aadi Asaithal)
2. Arunagirinathar (Kaithala Nirai Kani)

== Early life ==
The Bombay Sisters, C. Saroja and C. Lalitha, were born in Trichur, in what is today Kerala, to Mukthambal and N. Chidambaram Iyer. The sisters were brought up in Bombay. Saroja and Lalitha had their education in the S.I.E.S Matunga, passed their intermediate privately from Bhopal, M.P. and completed their graduation from Delhi University. They had their musical training with H. A. S. Mani, Musiri Subramania Iyer and T. K. Govinda Rao. T. K. Govinda Rao played a major role in training them on the nuances of Carnatic music, and how to enhance the raga and its bhava while singing sangatis in a kriti.

== Career ==
After they were groomed in Carnatic music in Mumbai, the sisters moved to Chennai when the elder sister, Saroja, first received a fellowship at the Central College of Music in Madras (now Chennai). The younger sister, Lalitha, also later received a fellowship at the same college. The duo got their name when Mouna Swamigal of Ambattur addressed them as 'Bombay Sahodarigal' (transl. Bombay Sisters) and the name stuck.

As part of the trend of duo singing in Carnatic music, which started in the 1950s, with performers like Radha Jayalakshmi, and Soolamangalam Sisters, Bombay Sisters began singing in 1963 when they started with light classical music, subsequently progressing to classical Carnatic music. Their first major concert in Madras was at the Sai Baba temple in Mylapore, where they were bumped to the prime-time slot because of the unavailability of Madurai Mani Iyer.

The duo sang in multiple languages including Sanskrit, Kannada, Telugu, Tamil, Malayalam, Hindi and Marathi. They stayed away from singing for film-songs through their career. They were also known for promoting young musicians through endowments and scholarships. They received the Padma Shri, India's fourth highest civilian honour, in 2020.

== Awards ==
- Padmashri, 2020; awarded by the Government of India
- Isai Peraringar Award, 2006; awarded by the Tamil Isai Sangam
- Sangeetha Kalasikhamani, 2006; awarded by The Indian Fine Arts Society, Chennai
- Kalaimamani for contributions to Carnatic music; awarded by the Government of Tamilnadu
- First women to be conferred the status of Asthana Vidushi by the Kanchi matha
- Sangeetha Kalanidhi Award, 2010; awarded by the Madras Music Academy
- Sangeetha Choodamani Award, 1991; awarded by the Sri Krishna Gana Sabha
- Sangeet Natak Akademi Award, 2004; awarded by the Government of India
- S V Narayanaswamy Rao Award, 2018; awarded by the Sree Rama Seva Mandali, Bangalore
- Maharajapuram Viswanatha Iyer Memorial Award, 2013
- Sangeetha Kala Nipuna, 1994; awarded by Mylapore Fine Arts Club, Madras
- M S Subbulakshmi Award 2019; awarded by the Government of Tamilnadu

== Personal life ==
Lalitha was married to N. R. Chandran, former Advocate-General of Madras. She died on 31 January 2023, aged 84, in Chennai. She was suffering from cancer.

Saroja is married to Rajaram, former chief secretary of the Lalit Kala Akademi.

== Discography ==
=== Sanskrit ===
1. Sri Venkatesa Suprabhatham & Sri Vishnu Sahasranamam
2. Sri Parthasarathy Suprabhatham & Pasurangal
3. Sri Kamakshi Suprabhatham
4. Sri Raghavendra Suprabhatham & Sthothras
5. Sri Mookambika Suprabhatham
6. Sri Sharada Suprabhatham & Other Sthothras
7. Sri Bhubaneswari Suprabhatham & Songs
8. Sri Kalikambal Suprabhatham
9. Siva Suprabhatham & Sthothras
10. Sri Lakshmi Hayagreeva Stotram
11. Sri Lakshmi Narasimha Stotram (1991)
12. Sri Lakshmi Sahasranamam
13. Mooka Panchasathi Vol 01, Vol 02, Vol 03, Vol 04
14. Gangalahari
15. Sri Bilva Ashtothara Sathanamavali
16. Devi Mahathmayam Vol 01, Vol 02, Vol 03
17. Sowdaryalahari
18. Sri Lalitha Sahasranamam & Ashtothram
19. Durga Sthothram
20. Sree Mahishasuramardini Sthothram
21. Sriman Narayaneeyam
22. Sthothravali
23. Sthothramala
24. Sri Hanuman Chalisa & Other Hanumath Stothras (2008)
25. Chinna Chinna Slogangal
26. Krishna Karnamrutham
27. Sivanandalahari
28. Sri Vishnu Padadi Kesantha Sthothram
29. AanandaLahari
30. Sri Guru Stotram
31. Sri Dakshinamurthi Manthra Mathruka Sthavam
32. Sri Dakshinamurthi Navarathnamala Stotram
33. Sri Dakshinamurthi Pancharatna Stotram
34. Sri Dakshinamurthi Ashtakam
35. Sri Guru Paduka Panchakam
36. Sri Dakshinamurthi Astothara Sathanama Stotram
37. Dakshinamurthy Sthothram
38. Sri Dattatreya Astothara Sathanaama Stotram
39. Sri Dattatreya Suprabhatham
40. Sri Datta Aparadha Kshamapana Stotram
41. Sri Dattatreya Stotram
42. Sri Datta Stotram
43. Dattastahavarajaha
44. Sri Dattatreya Prarthana Chathuskam
45. Sri Datta Navarathna Malika
46. Sri Datta Naamavali
47. Adi Sankara SivasthuthiMala
48. Aadithya Hridayam
49. SriSthuthi Bhoosthuthi
50. Padmanabha Sathakam
51. Subrahmanyam (Kandarkalivemba)
52. Sri Lalitha Trisathi and Other Devi Stothras
53. Devi Sthothra Malika
54. Devi Sthothra Mala
55. Mahishasura Mardhini (Nadam Music)
56. Ramaya Thubhyam Namah
57. Valmiki Ramayanam
58. Sri Dattathreya Sthothram
59. Sri Bhubaneswari Suprabhatham and Ashtakam
60. Sri Pudukkottai Bhuvaneswari Suprabhatham and Songs
61. Sri Yogabigai Suprabhatham
62. Sri Manik Prabhu Suprabhatham
63. Sri Ganesa Sahasranamam

=== Malayalam ===
1. Sapthaham (1991)
2. Sundara Narayana Guruvayurappan Gananjali Vol. 8- CD 1
3. Sundara Narayana Guruvayurappan Gananjali Vol. 8- CD 2

=== Tamil ===
1. Sri Abirami Andhadhi
2. Sri Guruvayurappa Suprabhatham
3. Kandar Sashti Kavacham (Sangeetha Music)
4. Daivegathenisai
5. Ganapathi Aayiram Namangal
6. Enn Annai
7. Divyaprabadham
8. Jaya Jaya Kali
9. Kandar Sashti Kavacham (KRV Music)
10. Karumari Amman Andhadi
11. Koil Mani Osai
12. Maagadu Amman Aaruvara Padalgal
13. Maduraimeenakshi
14. Mahishasuramardhini (Symphony music)
15. Narayana Leelanjali
16. Navagraha Krithis
17. Pallikkarannai Parasakthi
18. PoornayogaVibhavam
19. Ramanar Suprabhatham
20. Sai Bhajan
21. Sakthiye Sakthi
22. Saravana Sangeetham
23. Shanmukha Suprabhatham
24. Kudavarasi Amman Padalgal
25. Sivadarisanam
26. Sri Bhuvaneswari Kavacham
27. Sri Hanumanchalisa & Songs
28. Sri Panchamukha Herambha Ganapathi Kavacham (1993)
29. Prasanna Venkatachalapathi pukazhmalai
30. Raghavedra Songs
31. Raghavendra Suprabhatham
32. Raghavendra Navarathnamalai
33. Sri Saneeswara Bhagavan Sthothram
34. Sri Thiruchedur Suprabhatham
35. Sri Venkatesa Suprabhatham (Tamil)
36. Sri Lalitha Sahasranamam (Tamil)
37. Sri Vishnu Sahasranamam (Tamil)
38. Bhajagovindam & Mukundamala (1991)
39. Aandal
40. Vinayaka Agaval
41. Thiruppugazh
42. Sri Venkatesa Suprabhatham (symphony)
43. Mahalakshmi Suprabhatham

=== Kannada ===
1. Daasara Padagalu (1981).
2. Devi Geethanjali (1991).
3. Ambe Mookambe (1991).
4. Kailasagirivasa Sri Manjunatha
5. Navagraha Bhakthimala
6. Srinivasa Vaibhava
7. Varamahalakshmi
8. Venkateswara Suprabhatha (Kannada)
9. Goravanahalli Mahalakshmi Suprabhatha

=== Carnatic Vocal ===
1. Popular Composition of Arunachala Kavirayar
2. Popular Varnams
3. Swathithirunal Devi Krithis
4. Popular Melodies
5. Sri Thygaraja Pancharathna Krithis
6. Sri Annamayya Krithis
7. Thiruvayyaru Kshethra Krithis Vol 1&2
8. Sri Muthuswami Dishithar Navagraha Krithis
9. Kovur Pancharathna Krithis
10. Thiruvoytiyur Pancharathna Krithis
11. Sri Thyagaraja's Lalgudi Pancharatna Krithis
12. Srirangam Pancharathna Krithis
13. Ragam Tanam Pallavi
14. Popular Thillanas
15. Enticing Melodies
16. Classical Vocal - Bombay Sisters
17. Periyasami Thooran Songs
18. Panchalinga Krithis
