= Neeti Sastra =

13th century collection of maxims written by Baddena

Niti Saara or Niti Sastra is a popular collection of morals written by Baddena Bhupaludu, a Telugu poet. Baddena (1220-1280 CE) is the composer of the famous Sumathi Satakam as well as Niti Sastra. Details about his origin are not known. But, he is believed to be a Chola prince named Bhadra Bhupala. He was a Samanta Raju (vassal) under Kakatiya Rudrama Devi (reign: 1262-1296 CE) during the thirteenth century.

In the post-Mauryan age, Kamandhaka authored 'Neeti Saara' based on Kautilya's Artha Shastra and serves as an important literary source of Guptan age. It was translated into Malayalam by Sri K Chandrasekharan Nair in September 1951.

== Popular verses from Niti Sastra ==
1. I shall expound Nitisara (essence of maxims on proper conduct) compiled from all scriptures, bowing down to Vishnu, the lord of the universe.

2. Listen to the complete essence of dharma (right action) and contemplate on it. "Do not do unto others what one would not like others to do unto oneself".

3. Do not act without examining the situation carefully; one ought to act only after scrutinizing the situation carefully. Otherwise, one will have to grieve like the Brahmani (Brahman woman) who killed the mongoose (1).

4. Man is bound to experience the fruits of his good and bad actions. The karma does not diminish even after billions of days of Brahma (2) unless one experiences fruits of karma.

5. One cannot earn or retain wealth without undergoing suffering. There is suffering in earning wealth as well as in spending it. Is not wealth the home of suffering?

6. Only a learned person can understand the hardship borne by another learned person to earn knowledge just as a barren woman cannot understand the severe pain endured by a pregnant woman.

7. The parents who do not educate a child are his enemies since he is humiliated in an assembly of learned men like a crane among swans.

8. Onion does not lose its smell even if it is planted in a basin of Camphor, tended using musk and watered using the dew from rose petals.

9. A student acquires quarter of knowledge from the teacher, a quarter from self study, a quarter from classmates and the final quarter in course of time.

10. When a girl is getting married, the father of the girl looks for education in the bride groom; the mother for wealth, the kith and kin for family reputation and the girl for beauty.

11. A scorpion has poison in its tail. A bee has poison in its head. Takshaka has poison in its teeth. An evil person has poison in all his limbs.

12. Sky is the strength of birds, water the strength of fish; king the strength of the weak and wailing the strength of babies.

13. Renounce that wife who is quarrelsome, steals money, faithless and speaks ill of her husband, eats before feeding her husband or children and visits others‟ houses, even if she is the mother of ten sons.

14. An ideal wife will have these six virtues – she will be like a counselor in dealing with various situations, like a maid servant in serving her husband, like Goddess Lakshmi in beauty, like the earth in patience, like a mother in giving love and be like a Courtesan in bedroom.

15. Keep aloof from a horse that is drenched in water, mad elephant, bull that is maddened with lust and an uncultured man who is educated.

16. Helping an evil person will cause harm to one even as feeding milk to a snake will only increase its poison.

17. The fruit of giving charity to a knower of Truth (Brahma Jnani) multiplies like an arrow, shot by Arjuna that turns into ten arrows when he takes aim, hundred when he shoots them, thousand on the way and a shower of arrows when they hit the target.

18. Even God does not know about the leaps of a horse, roaring of clouds, minds of women, destiny of man, lack of rain or excess of rain. Then how can a man know these?

19. Attainment of wealth by an incompetent person, knowledge by a man of ignoble descent, a woman by undeserving person, etc. are in vain like the rainfall on a mountain.

20. Win the whole world by truth, sorrow by charity, elders by service and the enemies by archery.

21. Jati (jasmine) among flowers, Vishnu among men, Rambha among women, Kanchi among cities, Ganges among rivers, Rama among kings, Magha among poetic compositions and Kalidasa among poets excel the others.

22. He who gives birth, takes one to the Guru, imparts knowledge, gives food and protects one from fear – these five are equal to father.

23. The wives of teacher, king and elder brother, the mother-in-law and the mother who gave birth – these five are mothers.

24. Keep a distance of 5 hasta3 (cubits) from a vehicle, ten cubits from a horse and 1000 cubits from an elephant. Keep as much away as possible from an evil person.

25. In childhood, a woman is protected by her father, by her husband in her youth and by her sons in her old age. A woman should never be left alone to fend for herself.

26. The snake and the wicked person are both dangerous. The poison of a snake can be neutralized by mantra or medicine while there is no mantra or medicine that can remove the poison of a wicked person.

27. Longevity, deeds, prosperity, knowledge and death of a person are decided even while he is in the mother‟s womb.

28. Ordinary poison is insignificant when compared to the poison of the sin of usurping the property of a Brahmin (one who is virtuous). Poison kills only one person while the sin of usurping the property of a Brahmin destroys three generations (oneself, one‟s children and grand children).

29. Having two wives in spite of being poor, building a house on a road, doing cultivation in two different places, becoming a witness or bail in a lawsuit are the five self-sought misfortunes.

30. Seeing the elephants, snakes and birds in bondage, the eclipse of the sun and the moon and the poverty of the wise men I conclude that destiny is inevitable.

31. Those who are uneducated do not shine even if they are endowed with beauty and youth and are born in renowned families just like kimsuka (4) flowers which are beautiful but odourless.

32. Those who have one wife, three sons, and two ploughs, six cows and a house in the centre of a country are immensely fortunate.

33. Clothing is the prime requisite for decorations, ghee is the foremost requisite for food, virtue is the foremost requisite for women and knowledge is the chief requisite of scholars.

34. Ant-hill, honey in a honey-comb, moon in bright half of the month, wealth of the king and food received by begging, grow gradually.

35. Truth is my mother, knowledge is my father, righteousness is my brother, compassion is my friend, peace is my wife and patience is my son. These six are my kith and kin.

36. The Sun sets daily taking away a part of one's longevity. Knowing this, one should reflect daily what righteous action one has performed.

37. Speaking sweet words to the wicked is like offering a garland of exquisite flowers into the hands of a monkey.

38. Morning Sun, smoke from funeral pyre, coitus with old woman, muddy water and eating curd-rice at night increase ill health day by day.

39. Setting Sun, smoke from Homa (sacrificial pyre), coitus with young woman, pure water and eating milk rice at night increase longevity day by day.

40. One's wealth and properties remain at one's home, sons and relatives take leave at cremation ground. It is one's good and evil actions that accompany oneself after death.

41. Righteousness prevails and not unrighteousness. Truth prevails and not untruth. Patience prevails and not anger. Gods prevail and not demons.

42. Stocking grains, taking care of calves, doing cultivation oneself, serving one's elders – these five habits foster one's family.

43. Treat the child like a prince till the age of 5, like a servant till the age of 15. When the son reaches the age of 16, treat him like a friend.

44. Even a wise man perishes by teaching a fool, contact with evil woman and by resorting to the company of the wicked.

45. Save wealth for difficult times; how can the wealthy have difficulties? If one squanders wealth, one will eventually lose all the accumulated wealth.

46. One's physical body, wealth and other resources are transitory. Death is always at hand. Knowing this, a wise man should strive to do righteous actions.

47. One who plants a holy fig tree, a neem tree, an Indian fig tree, ten tamarind trees; three trees each of pomegranate, wood-apple and Emblic Myrobalan and five trees each of mango and coconut will not suffer Hell.

48. Will Neem ever acquire sweetness even if it is grown on top of a mountain of molasses and watered thousands of times with milk?

49. One who is beneficial is a kinsman though he is a stranger. One who is harmful is an enemy though he is a kinsman. When one is seriously sick, herbs from distant forest are used as medicine.

50. The knowledge confined to books, wealth that is in the custody of others and a son who has gone to foreign countries are useful in name only.

51. Company of wife is as good as the treatment given by ten physicians. Sun is ten times beneficial than the care given by wife. Mother is ten times beneficial compared to the Sun. Yellow Myrobalan is ten times beneficial than the mother.

52. Even a virtuous person perishes due to association with the wicked just as the swans that gave refuge to the crows perished because of the evil deeds committed by the crows.

53. The characteristics of the wicked persons and phlegm are surprisingly similar. Both of these are agitated by sweetness and are pacified by bitterness. (Phlegm is agitated by sweet food and is pacified by bitter food while the wicked person is agitated by sweet words and is pacified by bitter words).

54. Enmity comes to an end by death. Youth ends with pregnancy. Anger comes to an end by bowing down. Pride comes to an end by begging before others.

55. He, who renovates or helps to regain the glory of fallen family, abandoned well or lake, dethroned king, refugee, cows, temples and wise men, attains fourfold merit.

56. Profession of an artist or writer is the highest. That of cultivation and trade is mediocre, that of a servant is the lowest and that of a porter is lower than the lowest.

57. A bee pursues fragrance. Lakshmi, the Goddess of wealth pursues a tactful person, water pursues depth. Fate follows intelligence.

58. The following give better results when they are beaten: the wicked, gold, drum, stubborn horse, unchaste woman, sugar-cane, sesamum and uncultured person.

59. I bow down before these six persons – one who gives pure food, one who performs agnihotra (daily fire ritual) everyday, a knower of Vedanta, one who has seen one thousands full moons, one who fasts every month and a chaste woman.

60. Flees desire wounds, kings desire wealth, the wicked persons desire to quarrel and the wise men desire to have peace.

61. The sun stone shines by the mere presence of the Sun. In the same manner, knowledge shines in a disciple by the mere presence of the teacher.

62. One who does not do any charity is in fact a man of renunciation since he leaves behind all his wealth when he dies and goes to the other world empty-handed. I consider the person who does charity as a miser because when he dies he takes with him the fruits of his charity.

63. He is a wise man who sees the wives of others as his mother, the wealth of others like clod of earth and all beings as his own self.

64. Though the blue water lily, lotus, fish and white water lily are born in water, they have different odours.

65. The wealth that is not used for the gods, wise men, relatives or for oneself is destroyed by water, enemy, king and thieves.

66. One, who decides the course of action after intelligent contemplation when confronted with difficult situations, loss of wealth or life-threatening incidents, laughs at the lord of death.

67. The fruit of giving cloth in charity is attainment of kingdom; that of footwear is attainment of vehicle; that of Tamboolam (5) is enjoyment of pleasure. One gains all the above by giving food to the poor.

68. The virtue of cuckoo is voice; the virtue of women is chastity; virtue of Brahmin is knowledge and that of ascetics is patience.

69. The following three are the characteristics of a wicked person: lotus like face, speech as cool as sandal wood and a heart burning with fire (of evil thoughts).

70. Just as a coconut tree bears the weight of coconuts on its head and gives nectarine water throughout its life in return for a little water that was given to it during the first year, a saintly person never forgets the help that he had received.

71. Saints live to serve others just as a river flows, the trees bear fruits and the plants grow not for themselves but for others.

72. One should receive knowledge from a Brahmin (wise man), food at the hands of mother, betal leaves (tamboolam) from one's wife and bracelet (recognition) from the king.

73. Moon is cool. Sandal wood is cooler than the moon. The words of virtuous persons are cooler than moon and sandalwood.

74. Elephant shines by the rut (6), sky by rain clouds, woman by character, horse by speed, temple by regular festivals, speech by grammatical correctness, rivers by swan couples, an assembly by the presence of scholars, a family by virtuous son, earth by king and the three worlds by the Sun.

75. One who is jealous, one who speaks untruth, one who is ungrateful and one who carries enmity for a long time – these four are karmachandalas (7)

76. Protect your fame by giving up life. Life is transitory while fame will exist as long as the moon and the stars exist.

77. One who has received knowledge despises the teacher; one who is married, despises the mother; the woman who has given birth to a child, despises the husband; one who has recovered from disease despises the physician.

78. One who wears fragrant flowers on head, keeps the feet always clean, associates with beautiful women, eats food in small quantities, does not sleep on bare ground and does not have union with women on new moon days regains the wealth that was lost previously.

79. The wicked, if they are educated, start arguing unnecessarily; become arrogant if they are rich; if they become powerful, they start tormenting others. At the same time the virtuous persons utilize education, wealth and power for knowledge, charity and protection of others.

80. The following four are the doors to destruction: doing improper actions, opposing groups of people, quarreling with powerful persons and believing in the words of women.

81. One ought to ask the following questions repeatedly before beginning any new venture: What is the ideal time? Who are my friends? What is the ideal place? What are my income and expense? Who am I? What is my strength?

82. One ought to learn one lesson each from lion and crane, four lessons from domestic fowl, five lessons from crow, six lessons from dog and three lessons from donkey.

83. One ought to learn the following virtue from lion: Once a work is begun, one must put maximum effort to complete it whether that work is big or small.

84. A wise man ought to perform his duties knowing the time, place and strength and also having controlled all the senses like a crane.

85. One ought to learn from dog the virtues of getting up early in the morning, fighting, sharing food with near and dear ones and toiling for one's livelihood.

86. One ought to learn from a crow, five virtues of copulating secretly, valour, stocking food, etc. for bad times, impeccability and not believing in anyone.

87. One ought to learn from a dog six virtues: To eat in large quantities when food is available, to be content with even small quantities of food, to have deep sleep, to awaken easily, devotion to master and valour.

88. One ought to learn from a donkey the virtues of carrying load even when one is tired, not caring about heat and cold and always being content.

89. That person who cultivates these twenty virtues, will attain success in all his ventures.

90. Physicians, astrologers and sorcerers received with respect and offered food by everyone while those who have mastered other science do not get even a glass of water.

91. Knowledge is lost by laziness; women are lost when they are in the custody of others; cultivation fails when the quantity of seeds sown is very less; an army without a commander is lost too.

92. Though the Ketaki creeper is infested with snakes; does not bear fruits; is thorny, crooked (winding) and grows in muddy places and is thus not easily accessible, it is liked by all due to the fragrance of its flower. A single virtue nullifies all defects.

93. Fire is the guru of twice-born (those who undertake Vedic studies); Brahmin is the guru of other castes; Husband is the guru of women; A guest is the guru for everyone.

94. Of what use is nobility of family if a person is illiterate? A learned man is respected by Gods too though he does not belong to a noble family.

95. One can acquire knowledge by serving the guru or by offering sufficient wealth in return for the knowledge or by exchanging one branch of knowledge for another. There is no means other than these three to acquire knowledge.

96. Just as a pot is filled continuously falling water drops, knowledge, dharma (virtue) and wealth too increase gradually if one pursues them persistently.

97. One ought to learn both the art of fighting with weapons and knowledge of various arts and sciences. The former is scorned in old age while the latter is always respected.

98. Knowledge is like Kamadhenu, the wish-fulfilling cow. Knowledge protects one like a mother when one is in foreign lands. Therefore, knowledge is considered as 'hidden wealth'.

99. Knowledge without application is poison; Food undigested is poison; Assembly is poison for the poor; Young woman is poison for an old man.

100. One's friend during foreign journey is knowledge; wife is friend to one who is at home; medicine is the friend of those who are sick; fruit of good deeds is the friend of the departed soul.

101. Knowledge is extolled by everyone; knowledge is considered great everywhere; one can attain everything with the help of knowledge; a wise man is respected everywhere.

102. A king can never be considered equal to a wise man. King is respected only in his kingdom whereas the wise man is respected everywhere.

103. The life of one who is ignorant is meaningless like the tail of a dog which is of no use in hiding the secret parts or in chasing away the flies that bite the dog.

104. A student who serves the guru attains knowledge just as one who digs the earth gets water from the bottom of the earth.

105. One ought to make each day fruitful by studying at a verse or a part of it; one must spend time in studies, meditation and in doing one's duty.

106. The wise men spend their time enjoying literary works, reading or listening to scriptures while the fools waste their time in grief, sleep or quarrel.

107. An only son who is educated and virtuous brings joy to the whole family happy just as a single moon brings light at night.

108. Ambrosia should be obtained even from poison; gold must be taken even if it lies in filth; knowledge has to be received even from a person of lower social status; a woman of beauty and character should be accepted even if she is from a fallen family.

109. One ought to give one's daughter in marriage into a noble family; One's son must be given proper education; One's enemy must be made to grieve and guide one's dear ones on the path of righteousness.

110. What is impossible for those who are competent? Does distance matter to those who are industrious? Which is foreign land for the learned persons? Who is a stranger for those who talk sweetly?

111. One who is free from modesty attains success and happiness in following matters: In acquiring wealth, grains and knowledge, while eating food and doing business deals.

112. The following are the qualities of a student: eyesight similar to that of a crow, concentration similar to that of a crane, light sleep similar to that of a dog, small quantity of food and simple cloths.

113. The fruit of acquiring a kingdom is that everyone will obey one‟s commands; the fruit of austerity is Brahmacharya (celibacy and study of Vedas); the fruit of education is knowledge; the fruit of wealth is enjoyment and charity.

114. Anger is like the lord of death; greed is like the river Vaitarani (which is very difficult to cross over); knowledge is like Kamadhenu, the wish-fulfilling cow; contentment is like the Nandana garden (which is in Heaven).

115. Virtues adorn beauty; character adorns family; success in work adorns knowledge; enjoyment adorns wealth.

116. Beauty is in vain if one has no virtues; family reputation is of no value for one who has no character; knowledge that doesn't give success is in vain; wealth that is not used for enjoyment is also in vain.

117. Wake from sleep the 7 persons mentioned below: student, servant, traveler, a hungry person, a person struck with fear, a porter and watchman.
