= Shobha Raju =

Indian singer

Shobha Raju is an Indian devotional singer, writer, and composer, known as an exponent of sankirtana, the compositions of the saint-composer, Annamacharya. She was awarded the Padma Shri award by the Government of India for her contributions to the arts in 2010. She is the founder of "Annamacharya Bhavana Vahini" (ABV).

== Career ==
She began composing at age four and recorded her first gramophone record at age 16. She became an All India Radio artist that same year. At the age of 17, she was awarded various prizes at national level competitions. Shoba has trained continuously under various music masters such as Nedunuri Krishna Murthy and Rajyalakshmi in music, R. G. Narayana Raju for spirituality, among others. Shobha is the first recipient of TTD's scholarship in 1976 to study and start an effort to promote Annamacharya's compositions, and was also chosen as the first exclusive artiste for the propagation of Annamacharya"s compositions in 1978. Her first audio album, "Venkateswara Geeta Malika" is popular among Telugu community globally.

Apart from serving as Project Officer for "Rama Rasa Vahini", a music-based project in Endowments Dept, sponsored by Bhadrachalam Devasthanam; authoring books such as "Srihari Padartham", "Pedda Tirumalayya Parichayam"; her various projects in the field of music and culture include: National Level Music Competitions to encourage youth, organisation of the anniversaries of Annamacharya; discovering and publishing 39 compositions of Annamayya as the "Annamayya Gupta Sankeertanadhanam"; "Shanti Sankeertanam" to enlighten people against the acts of terrorism; "Nagara Sankeertana", singing in processions for spiritual awareness; she has conducted music therapy programs titled 'Sankeertanaushadham,' aimed at benefiting patients in hospitals. These initiatives have been organized in India and internationally; self-scripted musical feature, "Annamayya Katha"; presentation of "Upashamana Sankeertana", a special program for the relief of the prisoners; writing the story, script, screenplay, dialogues, music, and directing a tele-serial, "Sri Annamacharya"; application of "Swarayoga", a special program for the personality development; annual "Vaggeyakarotsavams" of 1983 celebrated in national level; and others. She advocated for the Postal Department of the Government of India to release a postage stamp commemorating Annamacharya.

== Biography ==
Sobha Raju was born on 30 November 1957 at Vayalpadu, Annamayya district, Andhra Pradesh (A.P). Her father R. G. Narayana Raju, a retired Deputy Collector, was a native of Tirumala Reddypalle, Chittoor district. And her first spiritual mentor, while her mother Rajyalakshmi, was her first music teacher.

She did her B.A. in history, Economics & Music from Sri. Padmavathi Women's College, Tirupati, A.P.

She is married to S. Nanda Kumar, who resigned from the post of Project Executive in National Dairy Development Board to support her mission.

Raju received her training in music from teachers like, Pullaiah, D. Seshagiri Rao, Pakala Munirathnam, Tiruttani Krishnamurthy, Kalpakam and Nedunuri Krishna Murthy garu.

Her work has drawn inspiration from the teachings of Ramakrishna and Swami Vivekananda. Swami Paramahamsa Yoganandaji's teachings also had a tremendous influence on her. The holy company of Chinmayananda Saraswati, Dayananda Saraswati, Vidya Prakasanandaji, and Sathya Sai Baba helped a great deal in moulding her personality. She used to sing Bhajans and recite Bhagavad Gita during their discourses

=== Other work ===
Raju has contributed stories and articles to magazines and newspapers such as 'Andhra Prabha' and 'Andhra Bhoomi'. She is also the author of a few booklets such as "Sripadartham" (Commentaries to Annamayya Compositions) and "Pedatirumalayya Parichayam".

She has composed many songs and poems since her childhood. Her compositions have been released as audio albums by various audio companies and temples. She is also the music director for the TV serial "Sri Annamacharya."

== Awards and recognition ==
In 2010, Raju received the Padma Shri award for her contributions to the arts, particularly in devotional music. Government of Andhra Pradesh honoured her with Hamsa Award in 2013. Shobha Raju has also received many other awards in the fields of art, culture and music. These include: "Annamayya Pada Kokila" by Telugu Association of North America; "Sankeertana Praveena" by Telugu Kala Samithi, Kuwait in 2000; Paidi Lakshmiah Merit Award; "Ugadi Puraskar" by Madras Telugu Academy; "Smt Ravoori Kanthamma Bharadwaja Award"; "ANR Swarna Kankanam"; "Abhinava Annamayya" by Telugu Association of North Texas; "Outstanding Woman Award" by NTR Trust; "Out Standing Woman Award" by Mahila Congress on the eve of Indira Gandhi's birthday; among many more. Apart from her graduation from Sri Padmavathi Women's College of Tirupati, she also received an Honorary Doctorate from P.S. Telugu University; and has been honoured as "Asthana Vidushi" by the Dwaraka Tirumala Devasthanam, India. The India Cultural center & Temple, Memphis, Tennessee, United States, nominated her as a member of the South Zone Cultural Centre in 1985. She has been a member on the advisory panel of regional ICCR; and is serving for many years as an Advisor to the Annamacharya Project, TTD.
