= Kasula Purushottama Kavi =

Telugu poet

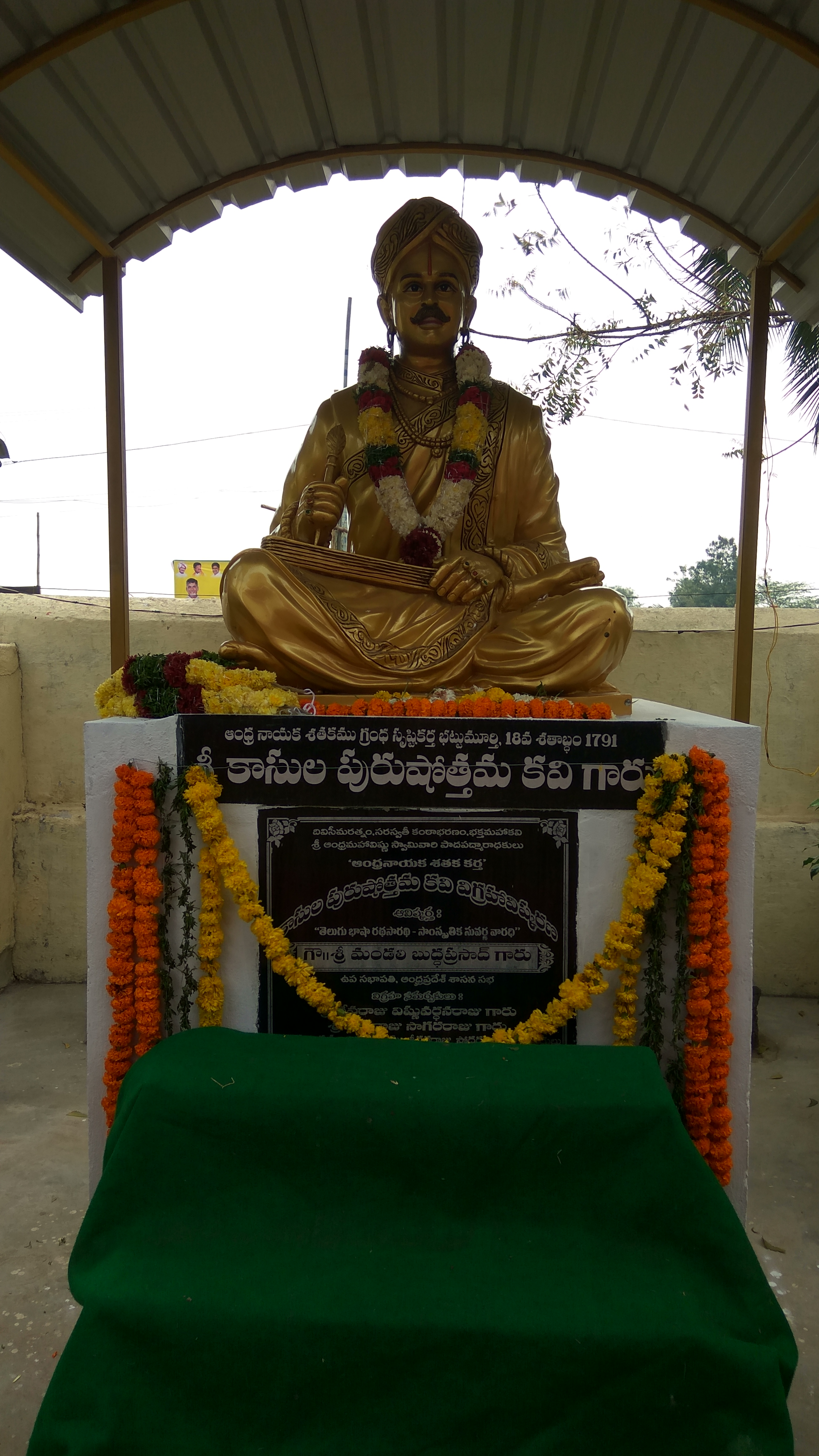
Statue of Kasula Purushottama Kavi at Srikakulam Andhra Vishnu Temple

Kasula Purushottama Kavi was a Telugu poet who lived during the late 18th century (fl. CE 1798). His parents were Kasula Appalaraju and Ramanamma. He hailed from the Diviseema area of Krishna District, Andhra Pradesh. He was a court poet of the then-Raja of Challapalli, Yarlagadda Ankineedu Prasad I (r. 1792–1819) of the Challapalli Samasthanam and possibly of his father as well. Purushottama Kavi is recognized for composing literary works in Telugu consisting of one hundred poetic stanzas, known as satakams.

== Works ==
Kasula Purushottama Kavi is known for composing the Andhra Nayaka Satakam on Srikakula Andhra Mahavishnu, apparently when the temple was occupied by raiding Muslim soldiers. The prominent Andhra Maha Vishnu Temple, to whose presiding deity Purushottama Kavi dedicated his satakam to, is where Vijayanagara Emperor Krishnadevaraya had a dream compelling him to write the Telugu text Amuktamalyada. From this satakam's refrain ('killer of false believers'), there is an indication that there was religious conflict in this period. The taunting tone and upbraiding of the deity is a consistent theme of this satakam. Purushottama Kavi uses three epithets to describe Andhra Mahavishnu in this satakam: 'God of many miracles,' 'darling of women,' and 'Lord of Andhra in Srikakulam.' The twelfth poetic stanza (translated) of this satakam reads as follows:

If Srikakulam is famous among the 108 temples, if it's true that you are known in all lands as “lord of Andhra," if it's true that you showed your hair to confirm the word of your priest, if it's true that, though you live in heaven, you came of your own will into this image, to be worshiped, then why don't you restore the daily rites and festivals? Otherwise, lord of Andhra in Srikakulam, no one will ever know.

After hearing a recital of Purushottama Kavi's satakam, the Challapalli zamindar, his patron, is said to have been moved by it and renovated the Srikakulam Andhra Vishnu Temple and restored worship there. Kasula Purushottama Kavi also composed Hamsaladeevi Gopala Satakam, Manasa Bodha Satakam, Bhakta Kalpadruma Satakam, and Venugopala Satakam. Around the central Circar Districts, his Manasa Bodha has also been quite popular.

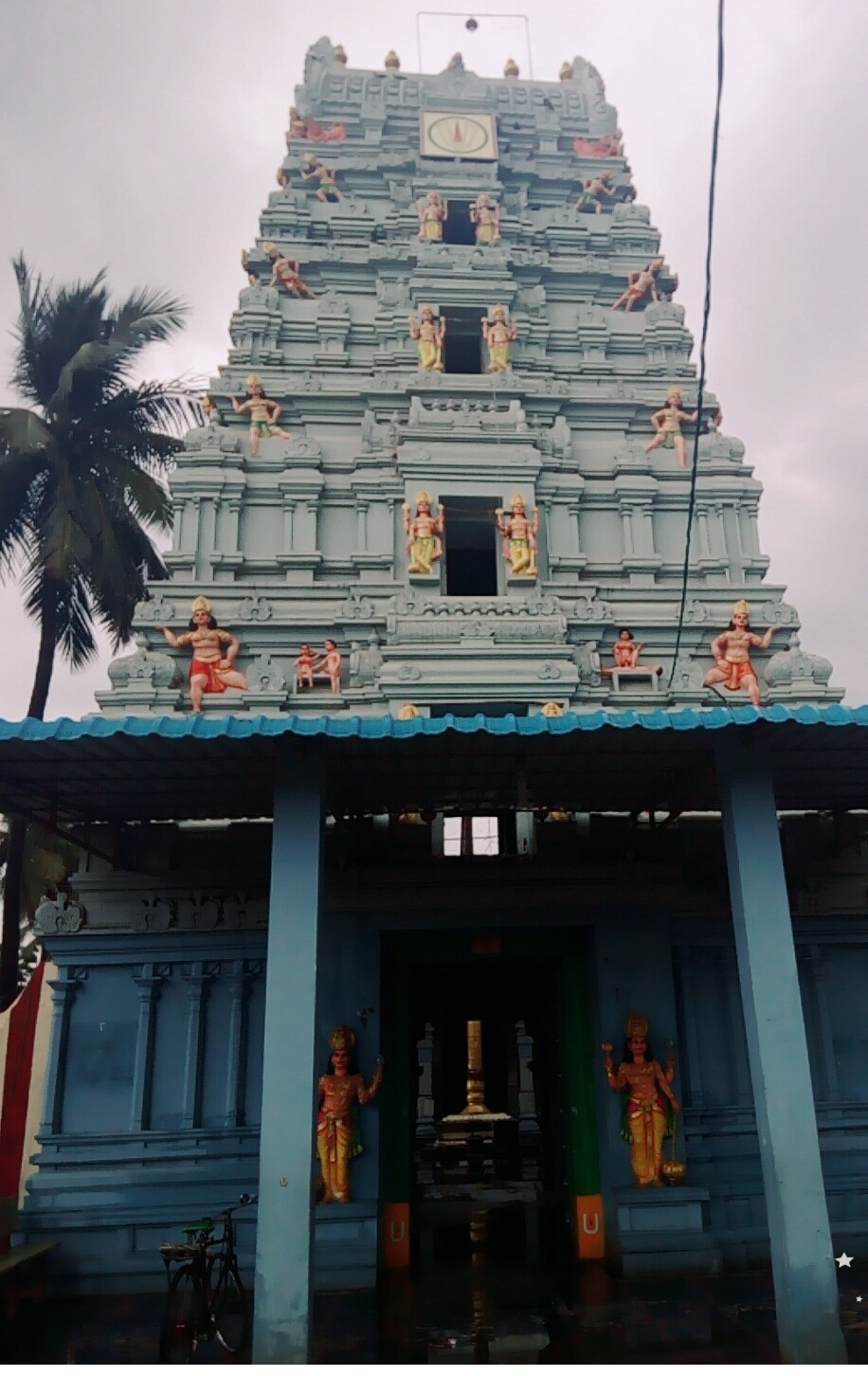
Front view of Andhra Vishnu temple
