= Asthana Vidushi =

Court musician or dancer in India

Asthana Vidushi is an honorary title bestowed to a court musician or dancer in India. Notable Asthana Vidushis include Bangalore Nagarathnamma, Aruna Sairam, Bombay Sisters, M. S. Sheela, Geetha Raja, as well as Srirangam Gopalaratnam, Shobha Raju, and S. Sowmya.

== History ==
Epigraphical records attest that courtesans who were well versed in 64 forms of arts were called Vaiseshikas, and many of whom have even donated their wealth to build temples. Courtesans who were proficient in dance were called the Raja Nartaki's or Royal Dancers and those who were highly proficient in music were given the title Asthana Vidhusi. They were given the title by the Royal houses where they would be obligated to perform in the celebrations held in the royal court. In the case of erstwhile Royal house of the Mysore Kingdom performing artists in music and dance considered it a unique honour to be recognized by the Royalty and given the title 'Asthana Vidushi' or Court dancer or musician. Such recognition would help promote their career and they would gain name, fame, and riches by their sterling performances in music, dance and abhinaya. Records of royal courts have a galaxy of many such Asthana Vidhushis. Apart from courtesans there were many other lady artists, who did not belong to the courtesan community of devadasis, who were given the title of Asthna Vidhusi for their outstanding artistic achievements in the field of music and dance, particularly in the court of the Mysore Kingdom. One such person who was not a courtesan, was Venkatalakshamma, who at the age of 22 became an Asthana Vidhusi for her proficiency in dance and performed in the court of Mysore till her age of mid-fifties when she retired. She also went on to achieve fame and get the Sangeet Natak Akademi Award for dance, the highest honour for an artist in India. A lower class lady from the scheduled caste belonging to the Banjara tribe, also known as Venkata Lamshamma, became an Astahana Vidhusi for dance and music. She was very famous and performed for several decades.

One of the most notable success stories of a courtesan, hailing from humble beginnings, who became an Asthana Vidhushi in the Court of Mysore, was Bangalore Nagarathnamma. She later shifted to Madras in the early 20th century to further her career, spent her life's earnings to promote Carnatic Music by ensuring the establishment of the Thyagaraja Aradhana, by building a temple for the famed Carnatic musician of the 18th century saint Tyagaraja. This music festival is held even now, every year for five days, at Tiruvayur. By her activism, she ensured that once a male centric music festival was opened to women artists alongside the famous male artists in music, and to sing concurrently in unison in the Thyagaraja Aradhana.

Another famous artist who specialized in Abhinaya, "the art of expression" form of dance was Jetti Thayamma. She became an Asthana Vidhusi in the royal court of Mysore.

Now, religious institutions such as maths and temples have been honouring artists with the title Ashthana Vidhushi. One such example is of the Bombay Sisters, C. Saroja and C. Lalitha, who perform in a duo, were given the title Asthana Vidhushis for Carnatic Music by the seer of Kanchi Mutt, who also gave them the epithet of "Bombay Sisters". They also went on to get the coveted Sangeet Natak Akademi Award for Carnatic Music, in 2004.
