= Vemuri Saradamba =

Telugu poet

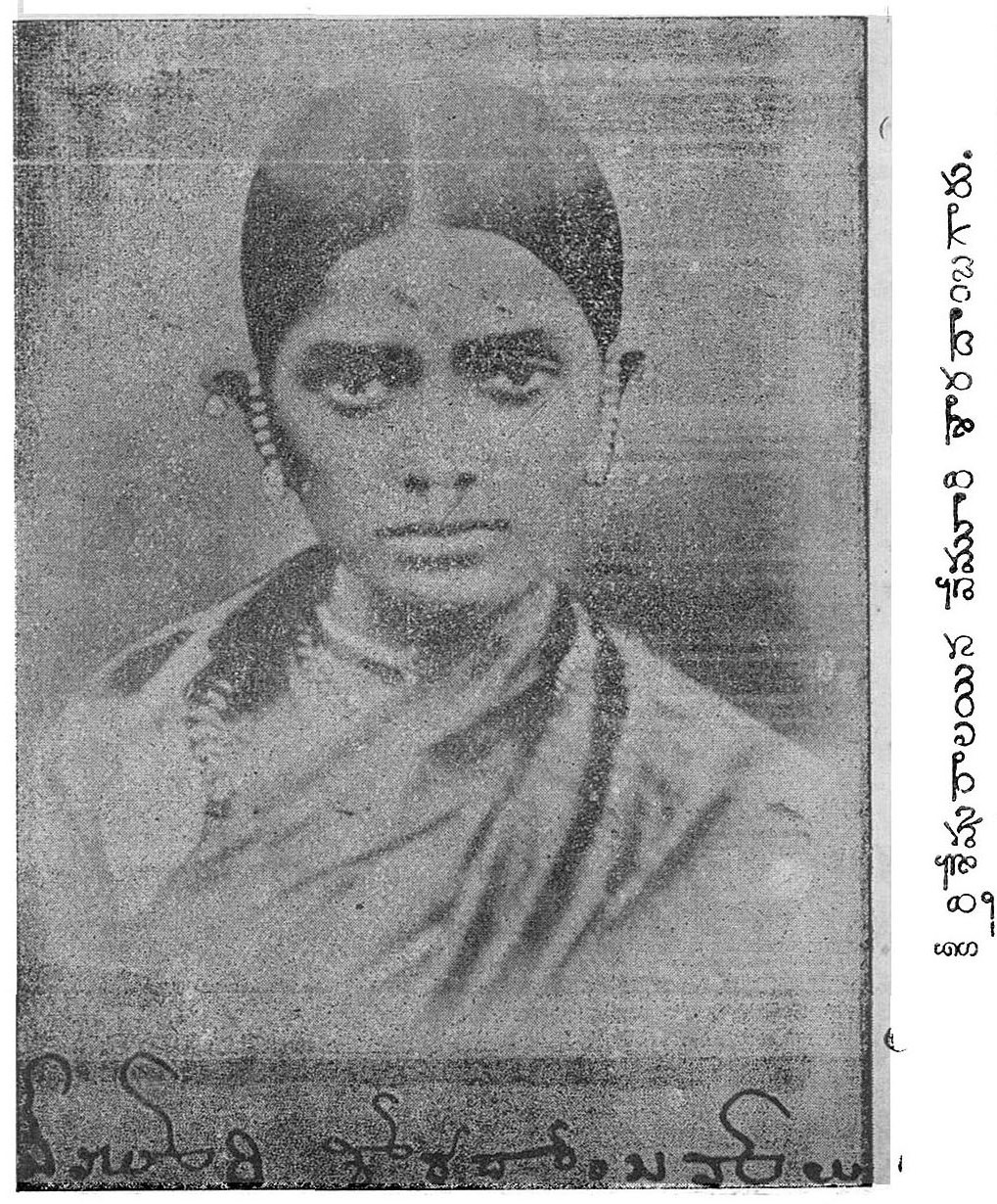
Vemuri Saradamba

Vemuri Saradamba (1881–1899) was an Indian child prodigy of the 19th century. She was a poet, musician, veena player, and performer. In a short span of 19 years of her life, as a teenage girl, she exemplified herself as votary of woman development in a society, where it was undesirable to give even a basic education to a girl child and teaching fine arts like music, dance was considered a cardinal sin by high caste families.

== Life and education ==
Saradamba was born in a Telugu Brahmin family to Mahakavi Dasu Sriramulu (1846–1908), who was a social reformer, multifaceted genius, scholar and Janakamma as an only daughter after six sons. She was born at Alluru Agraharam, a village (Mudinepalli mandalam), Krishna District of Andhra Pradesh, India. She inherited the talent of writing poetry and love of music from her father. Recognising her talent and thirst for knowledge, Sriramulu taught her Sanskrit and music from an early age, against the criticism and condemnation of society. She became an expert veena player in a short time and she gave public concerts in far places. She married Vemuri Ramachandra Rao in 1888 had a daughter Durgamba and a son Parthasarathy. She received no encouragement or support from her husband or in-laws as they had no taste of fine arts.

== Music and literature ==
As a child, Saradamba had an unquenchable thirst for music and literature. At the age of six, she was able to sing melodiously and began writing verses in her 11th year. She was recognized as a poet of the verse “Nagnajiti Parinayam”, the story of the divine wedding of Nagnajiti with Lord Krishna. Scholars acclaimed her work as prabhandham and her style was as engaging as the great 15th-century poet ‘Molla’. After her marriage, despite these impediments she managed to continue her writings. She wrote many articles and poems, on women's discrimination, suppression, and problems of her time which were published in the journals “Jnaana Patrika”, and “Jnaanodaya Patrika”. She dedicated her poetry to the glory of God. She wrote a work of 100 verses, “Madhava Satakamu” depicting the pitiable state of women praying Lord Krishna to give good sense to people to educate their women folk for their welfare.

She died at the age of 19 after the delivery of her son on 26 December 1899.
