= Priya Agraharam =

- Village
- Interactive map of Priya Agraharam
- Location in Andhra Pradesh, India Priya Agraharam (India)
- Coordinates: 18.4333°N 84.1500°E
- Country: India
- State: Andhra Pradesh
- District: Srikakulam

Languages
  - Official: Telugu
- Time zone: UTC+5:30 (IST)
- Vehicle registration: AP

Priya Agraharam is a village in Polaki mandal of Srikakulam district, Andhra Pradesh, India.

== Geography ==
Priya or Priya Agraharam is located at 18.4333°N 84.1500°E. It has an average elevation of 15 meters (52 feet).

== Notable personalities ==
- Sangeeta Kalanidhi Sripada Pinakapani was born in this village.
