= Domada Chittabbayi =

Domada Chitti Abbayi or Chittabbayi (Telugu: దోమాడ చిట్టబ్బాయి) (1930–2002) was a renowned nadaswaram vidwan and recipient of the prestigious Sangeet Natak Akademi Award.

He was born in East Godavari district, Andhra Pradesh. He learned to play the nadaswaram from Daliparti Piccha Hari.

He was associated with musicians Sangeetha Kalanidhi and Nedunuri Krishnamurthy.

He was Asthana Vidwan of Varaha Lakshmi Narasimha temple, Simhachalam.

== Death ==
Chittabbaiyi died in 2002 at the age of 72.

== Awards ==
- Sangeet Natak Akademi Award in 1978.
- Andhra University honored him with Kala Prapoorna in 1990.
