= Shataka =

Genre of Sanskrit literature

A shataka (Sanskrit: शतकम्, romanized: śatakam) is a genre of Sanskrit literature. It comprises works that contain one hundred verses. It is also a popular genre of Telugu literature.

== Etymology ==
The Sanskrit word śatakam means one hundred.

== Literature ==
- Dayashataka by Vedanta Desika
- Andhra Nayaka Satakam by Kasula Purushottama Kavi
- Dasarathi Satakam by Kancherla Gopanna (Ramadasu)
- Subhashita Trisati by Bhartṛhari
- Vrushadhipa Satakam by Palkuriki Somanatha
- Vyaja Ninda by Kasula Purushottama Kavi
- Hamsaladeevi Gopala Satakam by Kasula Purushottama Kavi
- Manasa bodha Satakam by Kasula Purushottama Kavi
- Bhakta Kalpadruma Satakam by Kasula Purushottama Kavi
- Sumathi Satakam by Baddena Bhupaludu
- Kalahastisvara Satakamu by Dhurjati
