= Malladi Brothers =

Indian singing duo

- Origin: Vijayawada, Andhra Pradesh India
- Genre: Carnatic music
- Occupations: Classical Vocalist, Duo singers
- Labels: PM Audios & Entertainments, Saregama, Kosmik
- Website: Official Website

The Malladi Brothers, Malladi Sreeramprasad (b. June 12, 1971) and Malladi Ravikumar (b. April 21, 1973), are a Carnatic music vocalist duo. Malladi Brothers obtained their music education under Malladi Srirammurthy and Malladi Suri Babu, their grandfather and father respectively. Subsequently, they studied under Sripada Pinakapani, Nedunuri Krishnamurthy and Voleti Venkatesvarulu.

Malladi Brothers perform Carnatic compositions, predominantly of Alapanas and Thyagaraja kritis variations. They are also known to experiment with lesser known ragas and compositions.

They have traveled extensively both in India and abroad.

== Albums & Songs ==
Year	Album	Language	Song	Co-singer(s)	Lyrics	Music composer	Record label
2019	Hari Samarpana	Telugu	"Tirumantramu Jeevanamu"	Nedunuri Krishnamurthy	Kaiwara Sri Yogi Nareyana	Nedunuri Krishnamurthy	PM Audios & Entertainments
2019	Hari Samarpana	Telugu	"Edigo Tirupati Kaashi"	Nedunuri Krishnamurthy	Kaiwara Sri Yogi Nareyana	Nedunuri Krishnamurthy	PM Audios & Entertainments
2019	Hari Samarpana	Telugu	"Jeeva Neevidhi Kaanava"	Nedunuri Krishnamurthy	Kaiwara Sri Yogi Nareyana	Nedunuri Krishnamurthy	PM Audios & Entertainments
2019	Hari Samarpana	Telugu	"Daasa Dasaanu Daasulaka"	Nedunuri Krishnamurthy	Kaiwara Sri Yogi Nareyana	Nedunuri Krishnamurthy	PM Audios & Entertainments
2019	Hari Samarpana	Telugu	"Mohamelaputane"	Nedunuri Krishnamurthy	Kaiwara Sri Yogi Nareyana	Nedunuri Krishnamurthy	PM Audios & Entertainments
2019	Hari Samarpana	Telugu	"Yogi Gunamulu Raajayogike Telusu"	Nedunuri Krishnamurthy	Kaiwara Sri Yogi Nareyana	Nedunuri Krishnamurthy	PM Audios & Entertainments
2019	Hari Samarpana	Telugu	"Devudu Thanalo Dandiguntudu"	Nedunuri Krishnamurthy	Kaiwara Sri Yogi Nareyana	Nedunuri Krishnamurthy	PM Audios & Entertainments
