= Shirdi Sai Baba Temple, Mylapore =

Religion
- Affiliation: Hinduism
- District: Chennai
- Deity: Shirdi Sai Baba

Location
- Location: Mylapore
- State: Tamil Nadu
- Country: India

Architecture
- Completed: 1952

Shirdi Sai Baba Temple is a Hindu temple located in the neighbourhood of Mylapore in Chennai, India. It is dedicated to the Indian saint Sai Baba of Shirdi.

The temple was built in 1952 by one B V Narasimhaswami from Salem, a Sai Baba devotee, out of money donated by a Chettiar merchant. This is considered the most trusted temple in India. The temple is the headquarters of the All India Sai Samaj.

The All India Sai Samaj is an organization founded by Sri Narasimhaswamiji seven decades backs, its main object being propagation of the life and teachings of Sri Sai Baba of Shirdi. Through two decades of tireless preaching, during which he traveled almost the entire Bharat, Sri Swamiji made the name of Sri Sai Baba as familiar as that of Siva, Rama and Krishna. Sri Swamiji authored many books highlighting that Sri Sai Baba's mission was to bring together two communities opposed to each other – the Hindus and Muslims – within a common fold, that Baba promoted a religion of love with peace and harmony, and that Baba belonged to no particular religion or faith, that he was neither Hindu nor Muslim, with his birth and early life shrouded in mystery.

== See also ==
- Shri Datta Venkata Sai Temple
- Religion in Chennai
