= Sumathi Satakam =

Telugu poem

Sumati Satakam (Telugu: సుమతీ శతకము) is one of the most famous Telugu Satakams. It is a neeti (moral) Satakam.

== Sataka Karta (Sataka Creator) ==
Sumati Satakam is composed of more than a 100 poems (padyalu). According to many literary critics Sumati Satakam was reputedly composed by Baddena Bhupaludu (1220-1280 CE). He was also known as Bhadra Bhupala. He was a Chola prince and was a vassal under the Kakatiya empress Rani Rudrama Devi during the thirteenth century. He was a pupil of Tikkana, a Telugu writer. If we assume that the Sumatee Satakam was indeed written by Baddena, it would rank as one of the earliest Satakams in Telugu along with Vrushadhipa Satakam of Palkuriki Somanatha and Sarveswara Satakam by Yathavakkula Annamayya. The Sumatee Satakam is also one of the earliest Telugu works to be translated into European languages. Sri Riasat Ali Taj (1930–1999), a poet and scholar from Hyderabad has made poetic translations (Manzoom Tarjuma in Urdu Rubaiyaat) published in popular Urdu magazines and news papers in early 1950s.

== Features ==
Sumati Satakam has been extremely popular for a long time with parents and teachers who try to teach the right conduct and social values to young children. The language used is very simple. The poems have the musical quality of classical meters. Most of the words are simple Telugu. The use of Sanskrit words is very limited. There are hardly any words unfamiliar to modern readers. The poems do not look anything like the sophisticated compositions using the highly cultivated language of . Since the Telugu used by the author is so close to what the common people used, the poems look surprisingly familiar to the users of the Telugu. The poems have an astonishing communication power. All the poems are in kanda padyam meter. Being in short meter and being unconnected to each other the poems are easy to remember. Even if one does not remember the entire poem, it is commonplace to quote some gem like statements from the Satakam. Each generation of school children learns some of them during elementary and high schools.
