= Manda Sudharani =

- Origin: Andhra Pradesh, India
- Genre: Carnatic music
- Occupation: classical vocalist
- Years active: 1983 - present

Manda Sudharani is an Indian carnatic vocalist.

== Career ==
Manda Sudharani is well-versed in the syntax and grammar of Carnatic classical idiom, rooted in classicism. She has performed at major carnatic events.

Rani's treatise on "Kalpita Sangeetam as the basis of Manodharma Sangeetam" resulted in the Ministry of HRD and Department of Culture, Government of India, awarding her a Junior Fellowship. She had also performed on All India Radio.
