= Vedantam Ramalinga Sastry =

Indian classical dancer in Kuchipudi

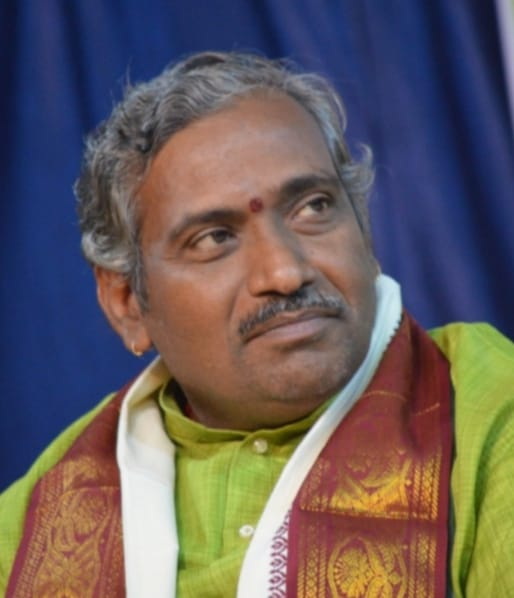
Vedantam Ramalinga Sastry

Vedantam Ramalinga Sastry is an Indian classical dancer in Kuchipudi. He was born on 3 June 1963, to Suryanarayana and Sathyavatamma in Kuchipudi, Andhra Pradesh. He is also a choreographer, writer, actor and researcher. He won the Sangeet Natak Akademi Award in 2012 for his research on Kuchipudi dance form. He is a retired principal of Siddhendra Yogi Kuchipudi Kalapeetham.

== Education ==
Sastry received a bachelor's degree in Telugu from Andhra University in 1984 and a master's degree in Telugu from Osmania University in 1990. He received his doctorate from Osmania University on "Development of Kuchipudi Drama in Telugu".

== Awards and titles ==
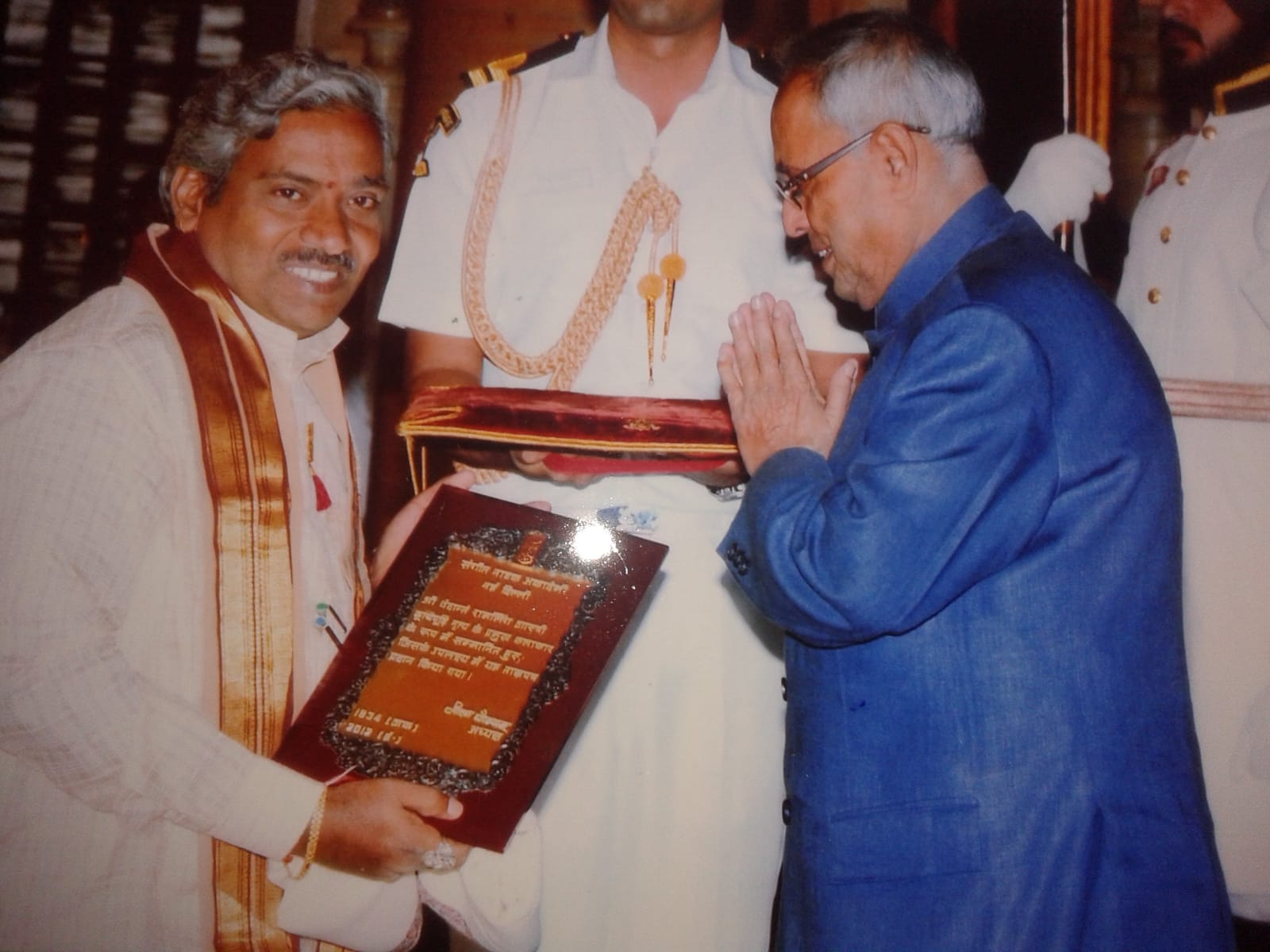
- Sangeet Natak Academy Award
  Central Sangeet Natak Akademi Award by the President of India in 2012
- Nritya Vidwan Award by the Government of Odisha for services to Kuchipudi dance in 2012
- PadmaSri K. Shobha Naidu Excellence Award - 2023 by Nataraj Music and Dance Academy at Visakhapatnam on 8 July 2023
- Sri Siddendrayogi Award on 15 October 2023 at Kuchipudi on the occasion of "4th World Kuchipudi Dance Day 2023".

== Family ==
His wife, Venkata Durga Bhavani, is a music director and singer. They have two children.
