= Sthai =

Carnatic music octaves

In Carnatic music, Sthai or Sthaayi refers to the octave. Madhyamasthai refers to the middle octave, Tarasthai refers to the upper octave and Mandhrasthai refers to the lower octave. Sthai can be defined as the interval or span made up of shadja to nishabam in Indian Music.

== Types ==
The Five types of Sthayi are:

Name of Sthayi	Octave	Method of Denoting
Anumandra Sthayi	2 octaves below	Two dots below the Swara
Mandara Sthayi	Lower octave	One dot below the Swara
Madhya Sthayi	Middle octave	Swara with no dots
Thara Sthayi	Higher octave	One dot above the Swara
Ati Thara Sthayi	2 Octaves above	Two dots above the Swara

== See also ==
- Sthayi
