= Andhra Vishnu =

Hindu statue in India

Andhra Vishnu, better known as Srikakula Andhra Mahavishnu statue, was set up in Andhra in a pre-existing older temple. The previous deistic form worshiped in the temple is unknown.

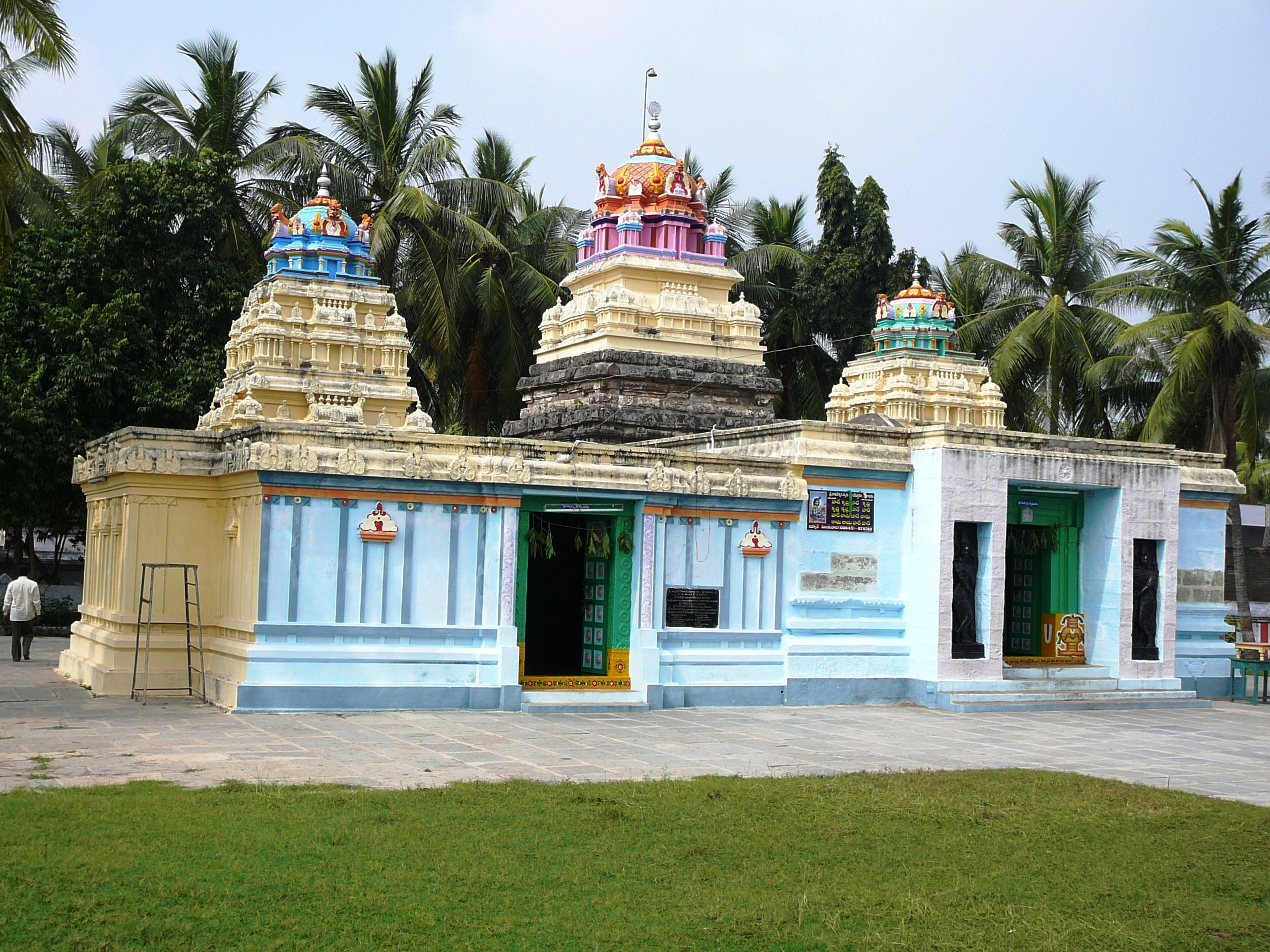
View of Srikakulandhra Maha Vishnu Temple, Srikakulam village, Krishna District, Andhra Pradesh

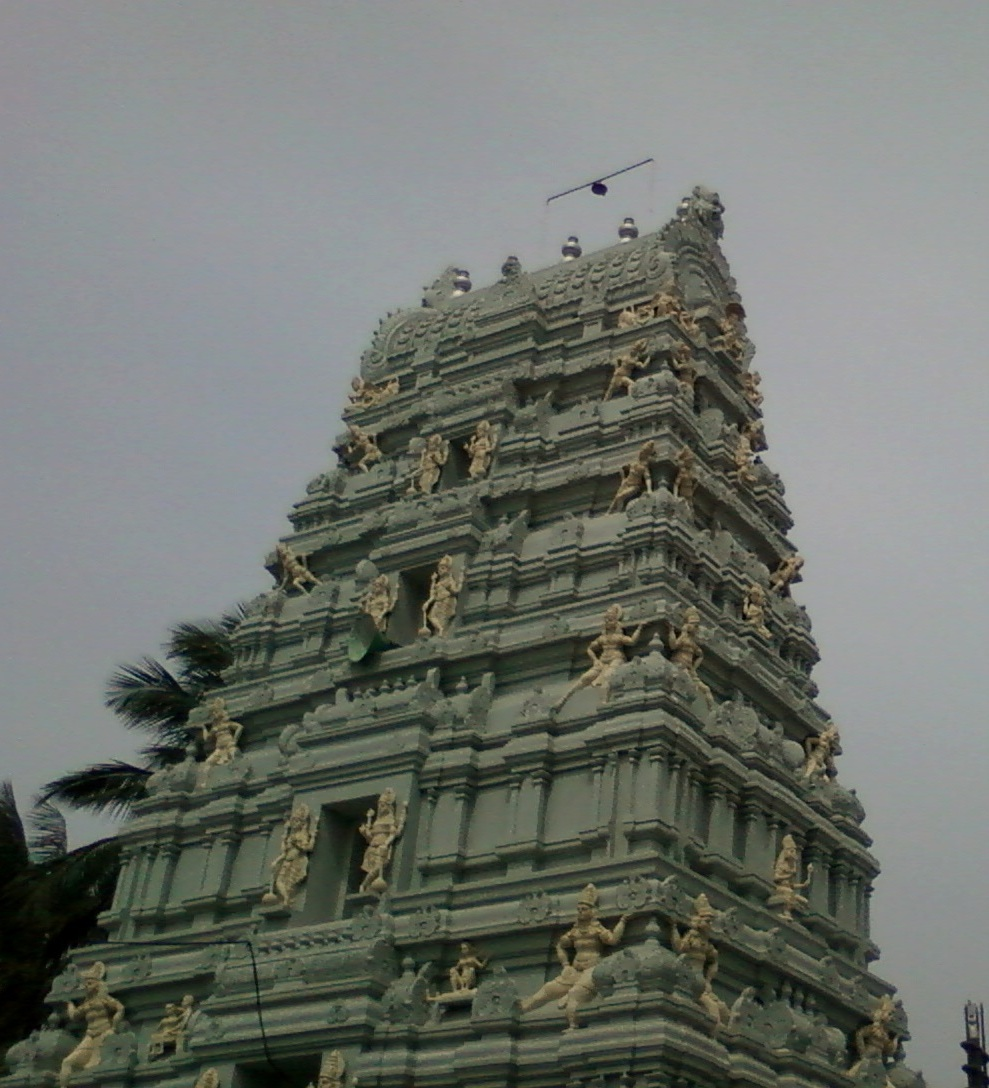
Gopuram Srikakaula Andhramaha vishnu temple

== Āndhra Vishnu temple ==
The deity of the temple is known as Andhra Maha Vishnu or Srikakulandhra Maha Vishnu. The main sanctum of the temple survived at least since the time of the Satavahana emperors. The deity for whom the Satavahanas built the temple is unknown. The temple was also repaired and worshipped restored by the Rajas of Challapalli after a period of decline due to Muslim raids.

This temple has many attractions and historical links. As many as 32 inscriptions, including those issued by Krishnadevaraya, appear on the walls of the temple.

== Andhra Kaumudi ==
In Andhra Kaumudi, a Telugu grammar book it was mentioned that he was son of Suchandra. It seems Āndhra Viṣhṇu having built an immense wall, connecting Sri Sailam, Bheemeswaram, and Kaleshwaram, with the Mahendra hills, formed in it three gates, in which the three eyed Ishwara, bearing the trident in his hand and attended by a host of divine gods resided in the form of three lingams. Āndhra Viṣhṇu assisted by divine gods having fought with the great giant Nishambhu for thirteen yugas killed him in battle and took up his residence with the sages on the banks of the river Godavari, since which time, the Andhra country has been named Trilingam.

== Andhra Nayaka Satakam ==
Andhra Nayaka Satakam was written by Kasula Purushottama Kavi, a poet who enjoyed the patronage of the Zamindar of Challapalli in Diviseema region of Andhra Pradesh. After hearing this satakam and being moved by it, the Srikakulandhra Maha Vishnu Temple was also repaired and worshipped restored by the Zamindars of Challapalli.

== Āmuktamālyada ==
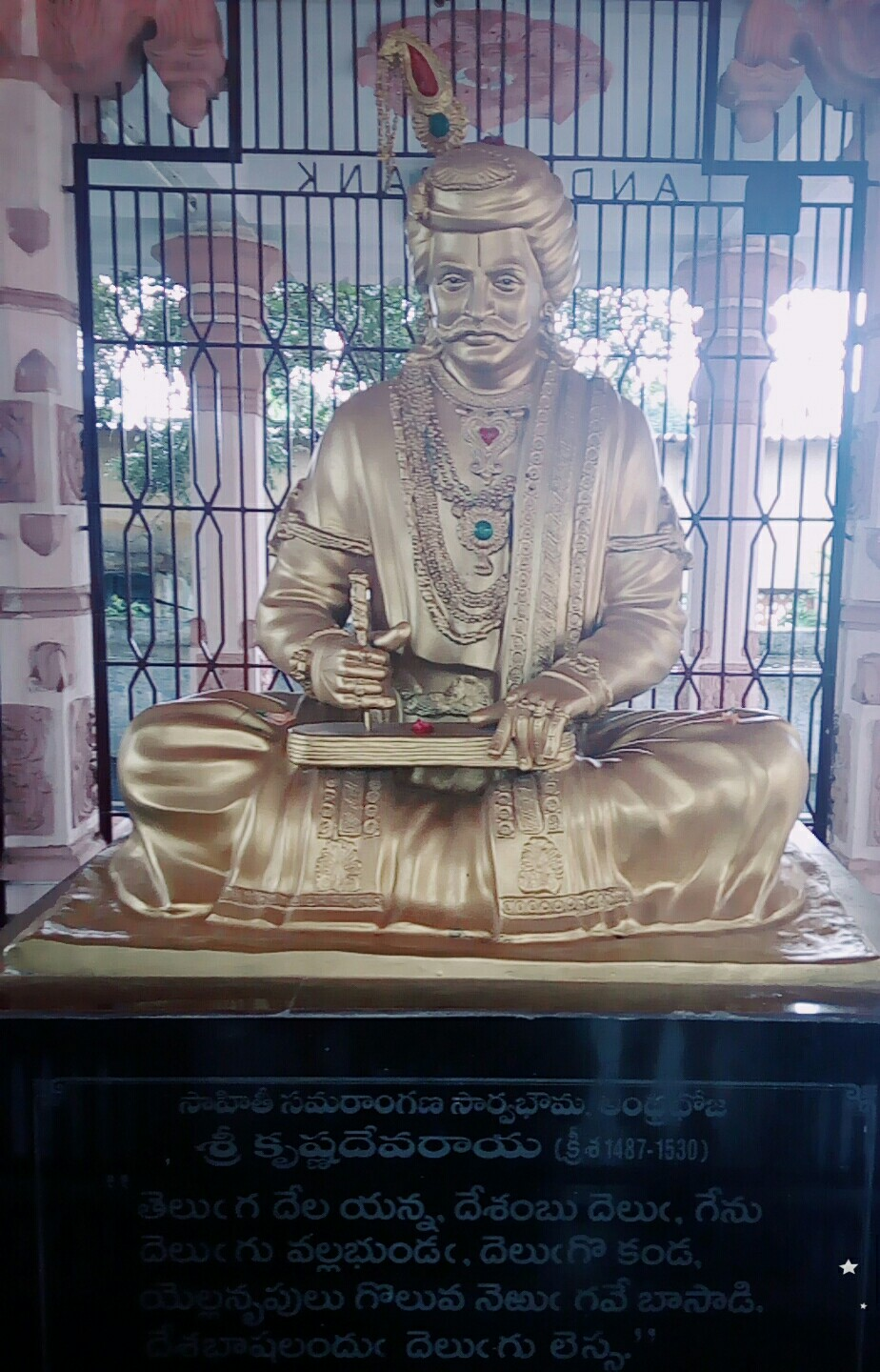
Sri Krishnadevaraya statue at andhra maha vishnu temple

Once the Vijayanagara emperor Krishnadevaraya was travelling via Vijayawada during his Kalinga campaign. He had conquered Vijayawada, Kondapalli fort and the surrounding areas. He learned of the holy temple of Andhra Viṣhṇu and visited Srikakulam village for a few days. He performed the Ekadasi Vratam during that time. It is here that Andhra Viṣhṇu appeared to the emperor in an early morning dream.

Krishnadevaraya said

Observing the fast of the Vishnu's Day, in the fourth and last watch of that God's night, Andhra Vishnu came to me in my dream. His body was a radiant black, blacker than the rain cloud. His eyes wise and sparkling, put the lotus to shame. He was clothed in the best golden silk, finer still than the down on his eagle's wings. The red sunrise is pale compared to ruby on his chest.

Andhra Viṣhṇu told him to compose the story of his wedding with Andal at Srirangam. He also ordered the emperor to tell the story in the Telugu language. The emperor obliged, composing Amuktamalyada, which is one of the most famous poetic works in Telugu literature. From 14th poem of this work we can see that the Lord Śrī Āndhra Viṣhṇu refers himself as King of Telugus (Telugu Vallabhunḍa).

తెలుఁగ దేల నన్న దేశంబు దెలుఁగేను
తెలుఁగు వల్లభుండఁ దెలుఁ గొకండ
యెల్ల నృపులగొలువ నెరుఁగ వే బాసాడి
దేశభాషలందుఁ తెలుఁగు లెస్స

— శ్రీ ఆంధ్ర విష్ణు

telugadElayanna, dESambu telugEnu
telugu vallaBhunDa telugokanDa
yella nRpulu golva nerugavE bAsADi
dESa BhAShalandu telugu lessa

— Śrī Āndhra Viṣhṇu's reason on why Āmuktamālyada should be written in telugu by Sri Krishnadevaraya

The nation that knows Telugu will have clarity. Vallaba (Chief herdsman, lord) is Telugu and Telugu will be a protection. A language used in courts of all kings. In the languages of the all nations Telugu is used in abundance and is excellent.

Within Amuktamalyada itself it was mentioned that on a Harivasara, Sri Krishnadevaraya had the Darsan of Andhra Viṣhṇu. Harivasara is the time between the last four muhurtas of Ekadasi and the first four muhurtas of Dwadasi, i.e., 6 hours and 24 minutes. This incident of visiting the temple must be between Ahobilam Śaasanam (dated December 1515) and Simhāchalam Śaasanam (dated 30 March 1515)

== Popular culture ==
Srikakula Andhra Maha Vishnu Katha, a 1962 Telugu movie, was based on the story.

== gallery ==
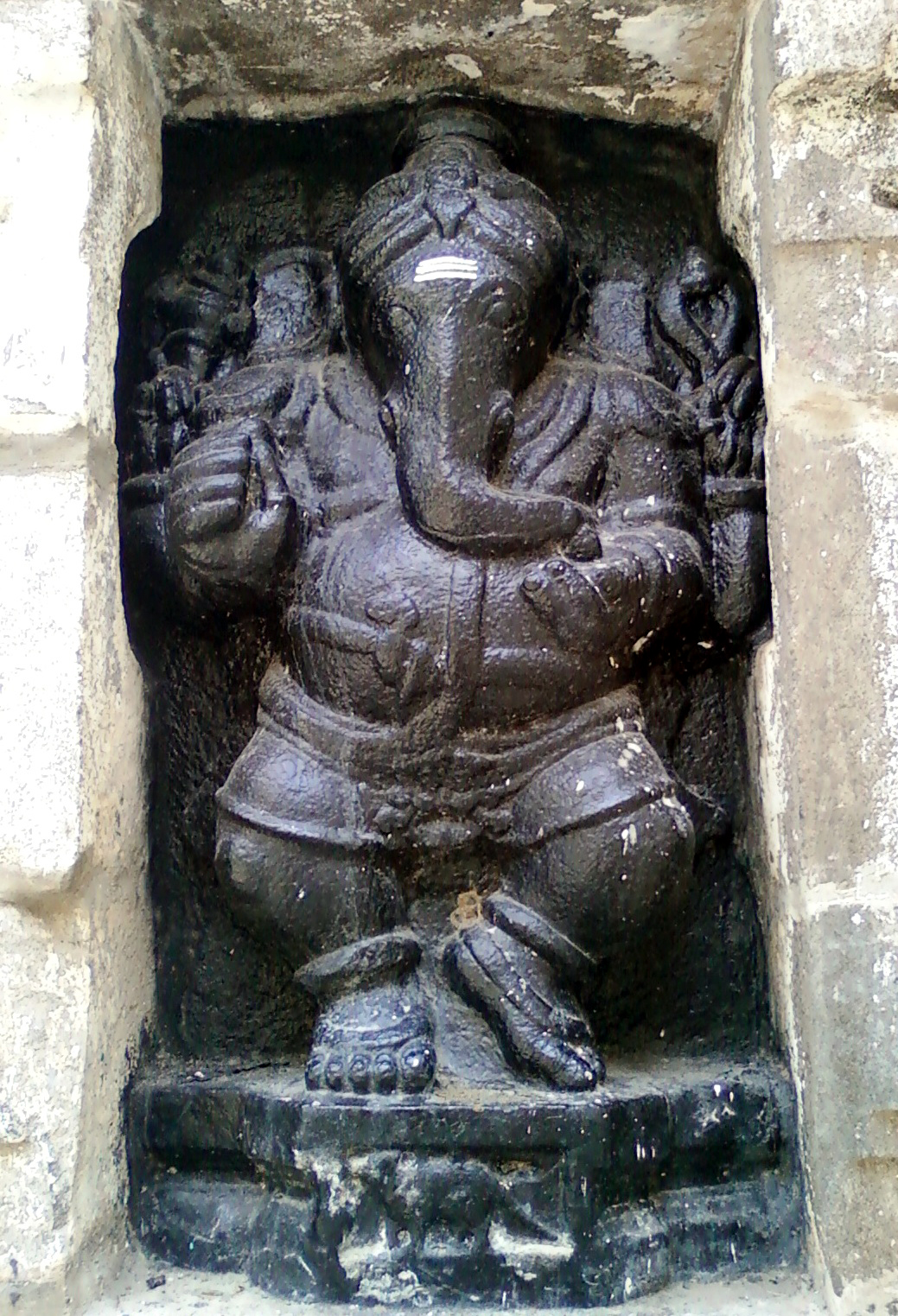

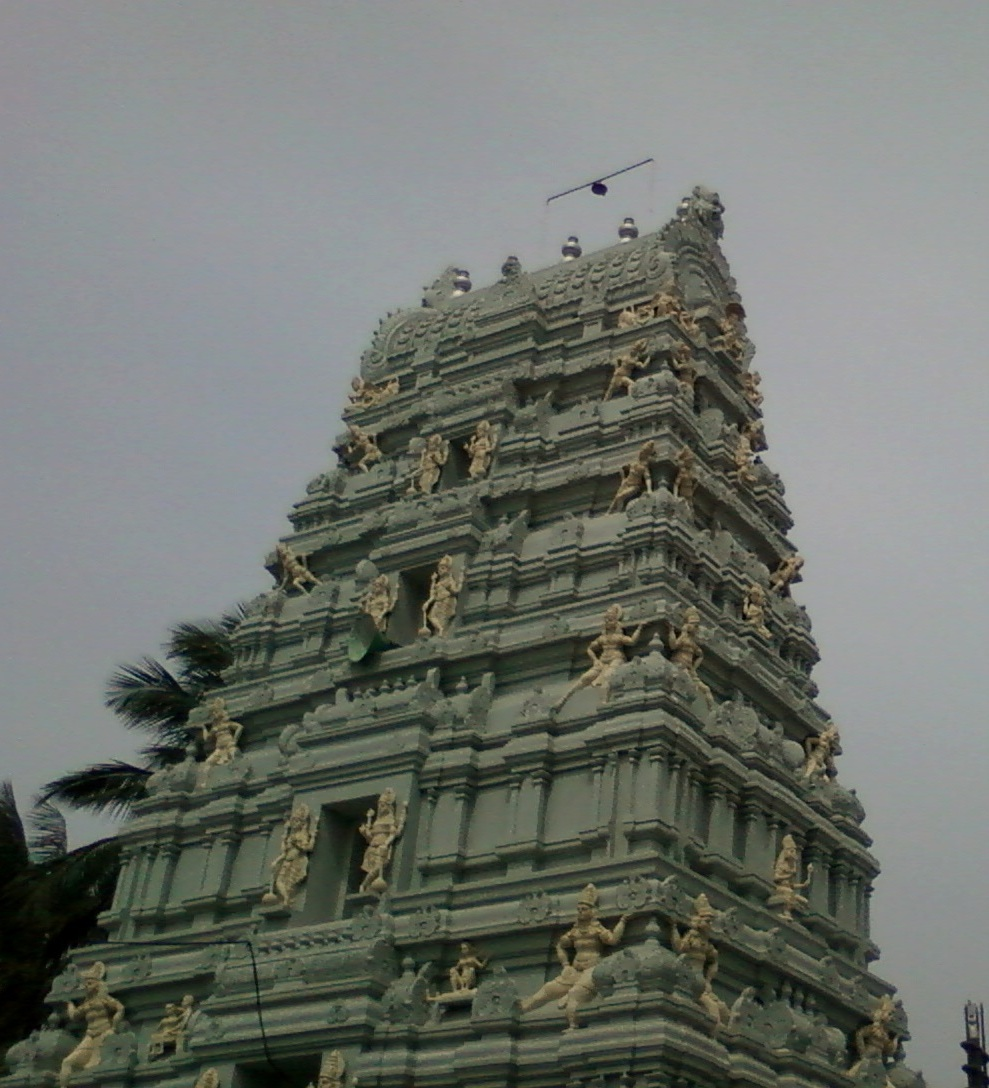

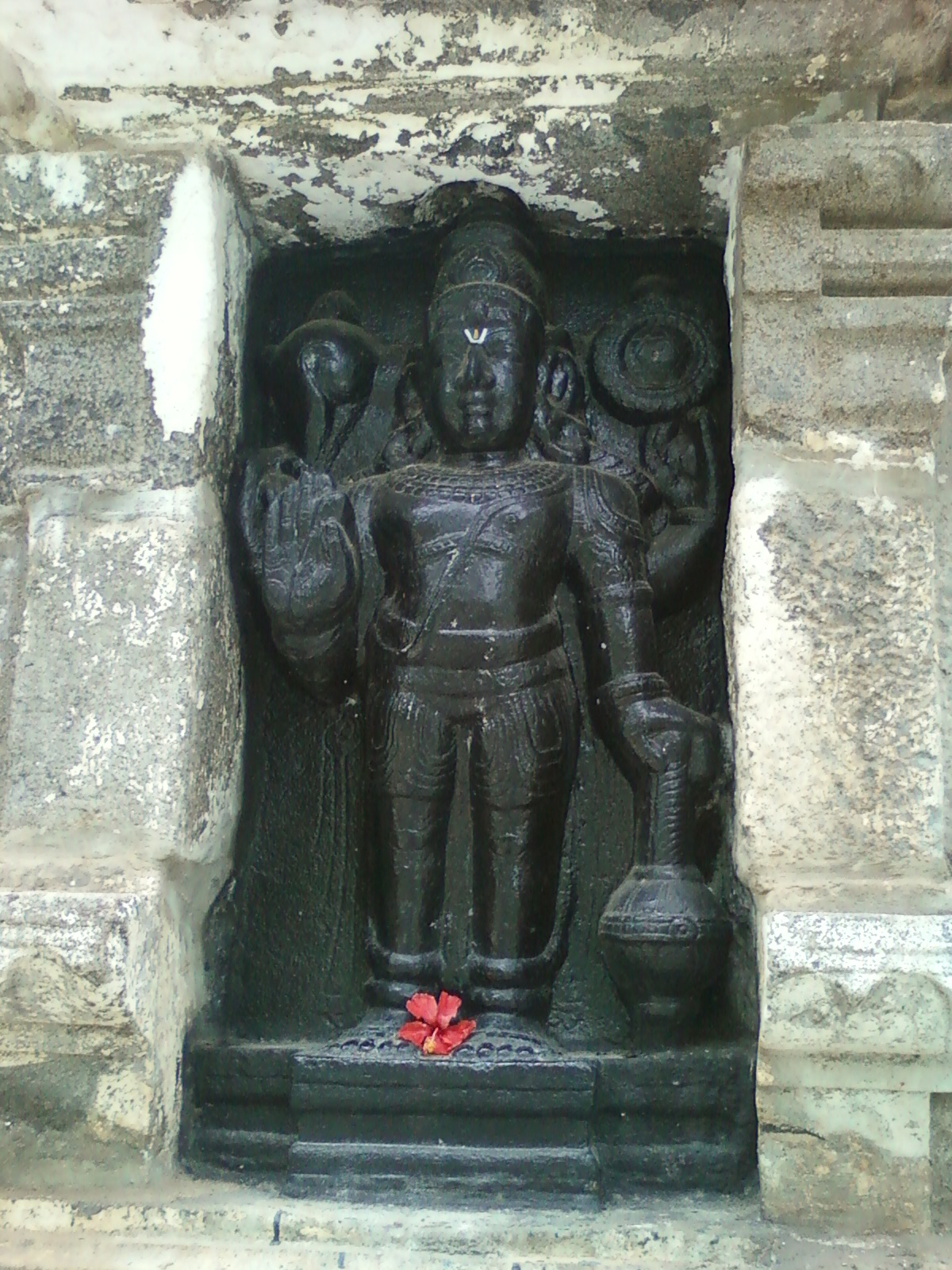

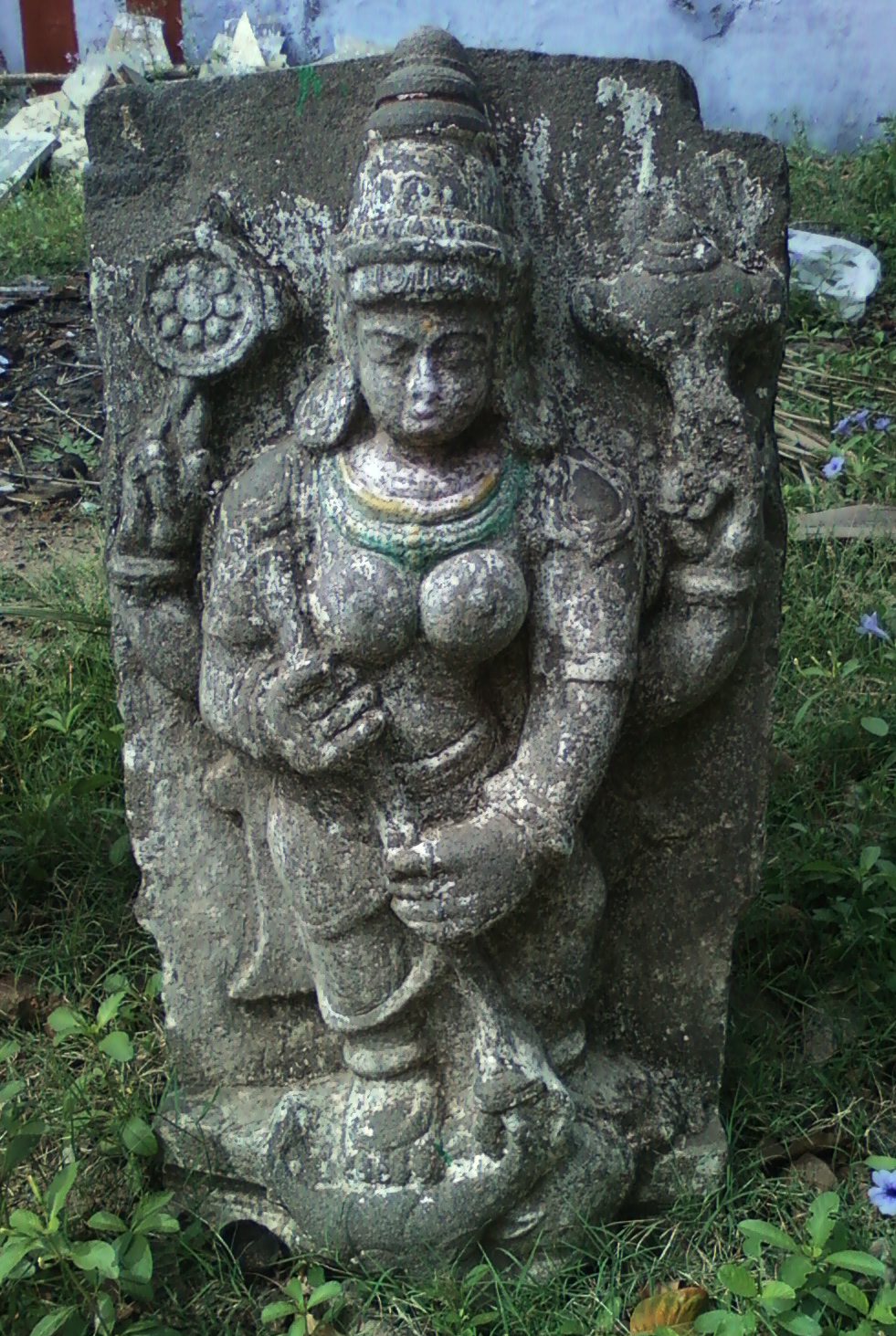

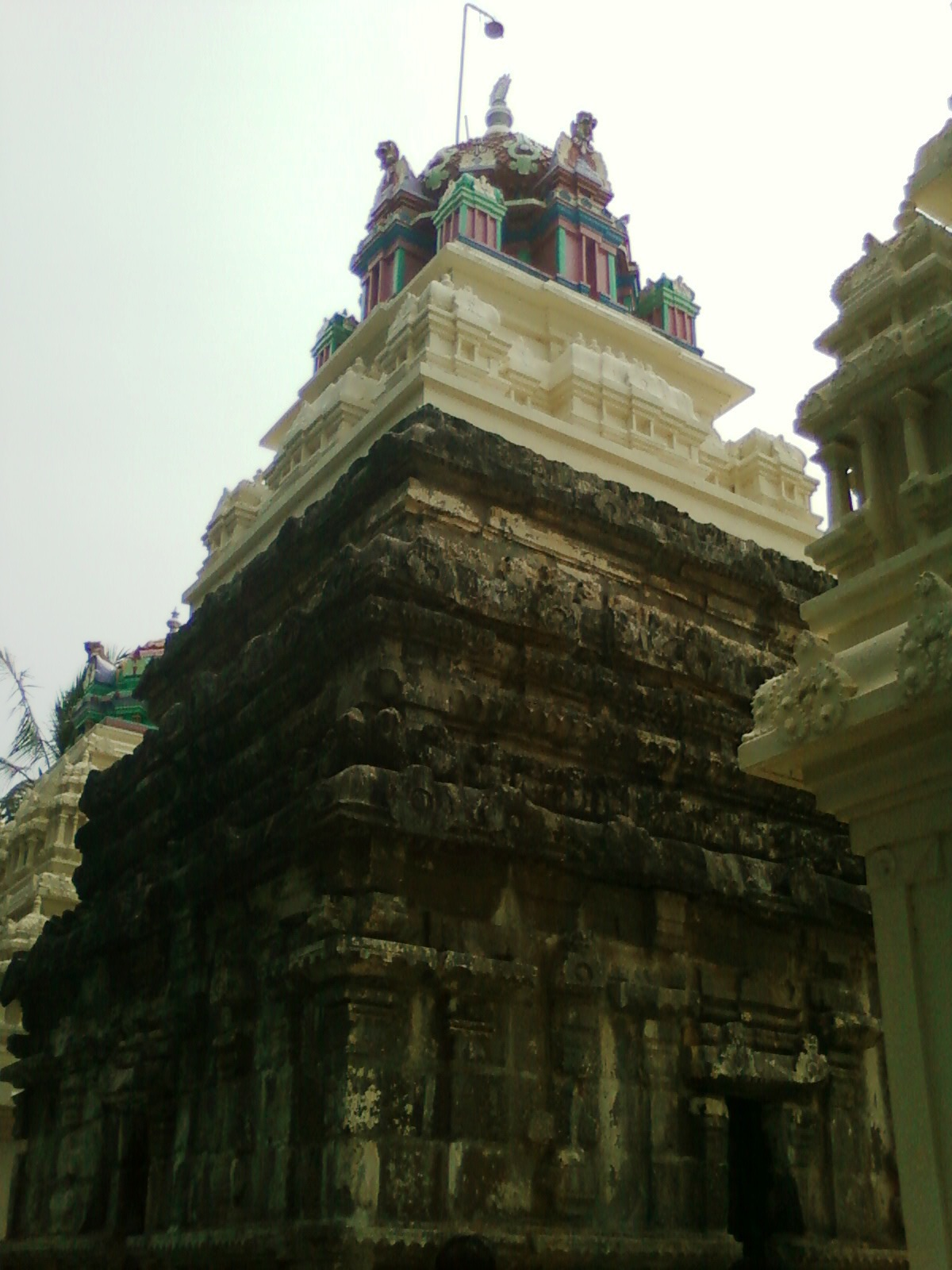

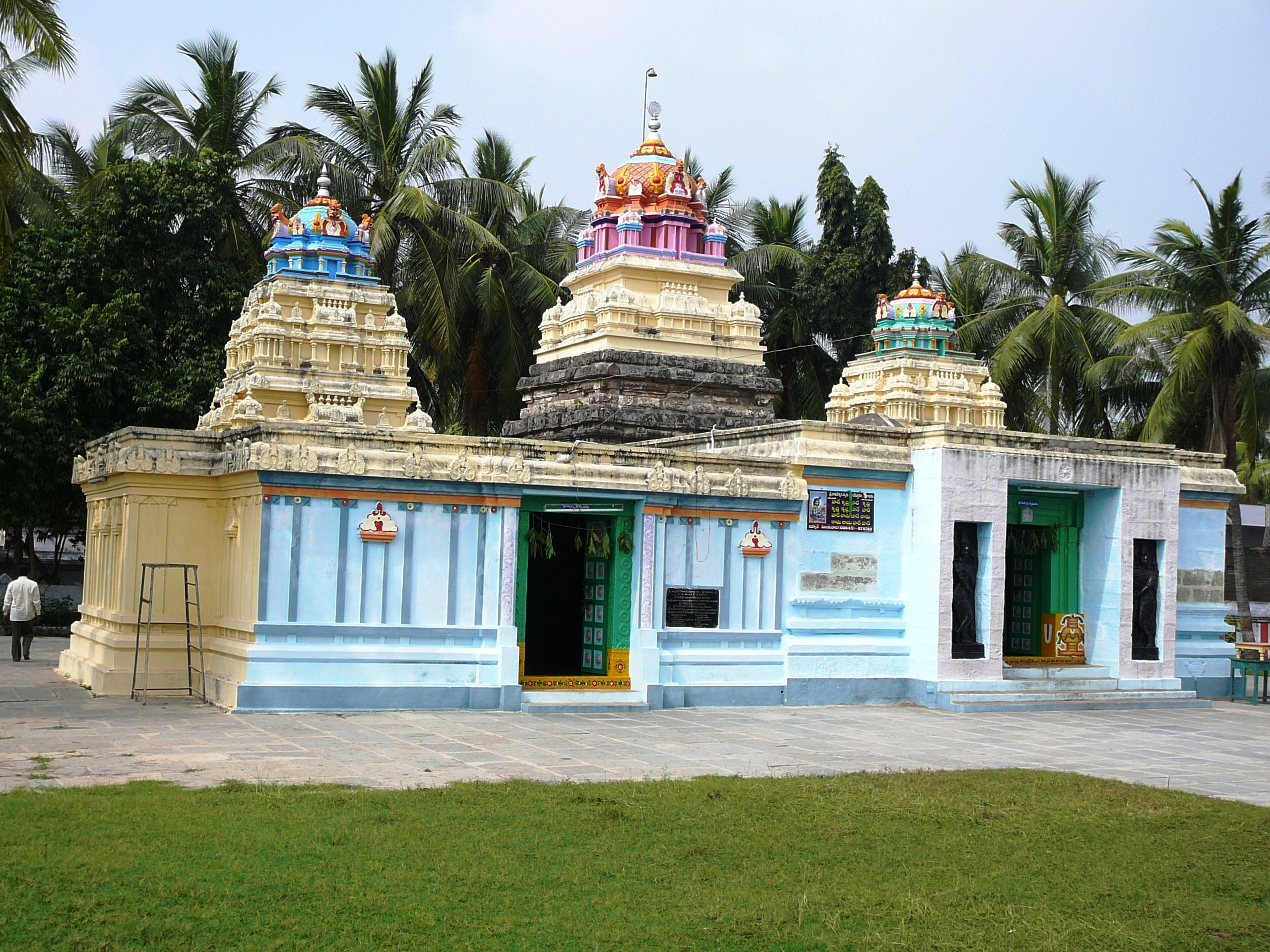
