= Srirangam Gopalaratnam =

Indian singer

Srirangam Gopalaratnam (1939 – 16 March 1993) was an Indian classical and film playback singer. She is distinguished in the exposition of Kuchipudi, Yakshagana, Javali and Yenki Patalu. She was born to Varadachari and Subhadramma at Pushpagiri in Vizianagaram district.

== Music ==
She received training in music under Kavirayuni Joga Rao and Dr. Sripada Pinakapani. She earned a diploma in music in 1956. A child prodigy, she also gave Harikathas.

She served as Principal of Government Music College, Hyderabad, Professor and Dean of Telugu University. She has worked as Principal of Maharajah's Government College of Music and Dance, Vizianagaram between 1979 and 1980. She has also held a post for the Bhakthi Ranjani programmes in All India Radio.

Srirangam's famous Kannada film song Krishnana kolalina kare from the movie 'Subbashastry' (1966) is still popular in all over Karnataka, even after five decades.

== Awards ==
- She was honoured with the Presidential title 'Padma Sri' in 1992.
- She was Asthana Vidushi, Tirumala Tirupati Devasthanams.
- Her disciples carnatic vocalist Yadayya and many others
