= Nedunuri Krishnamurthy =

Indian carnatic vocalist (1927–2014)

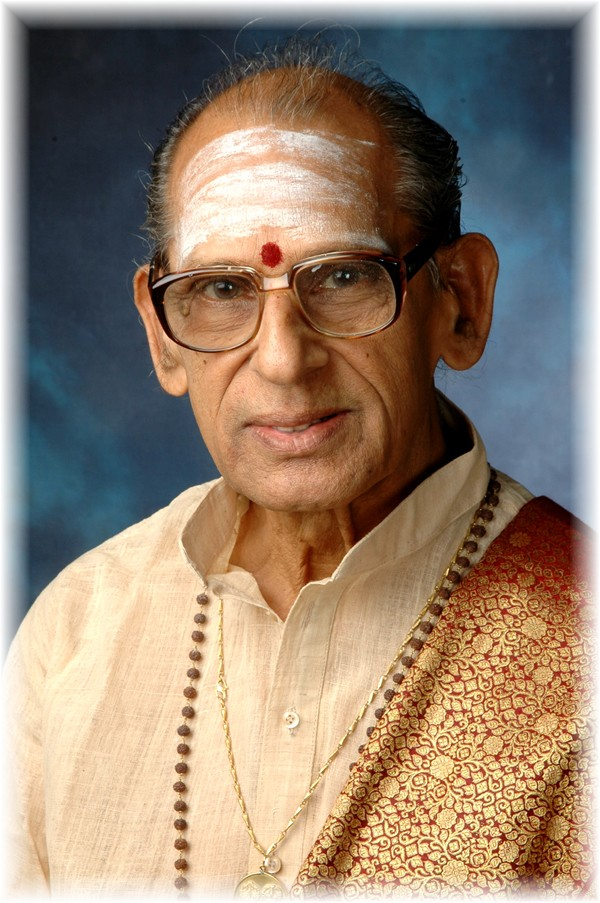

Background information
- Born: 10 October 1927; Kothapalli, Pithapuram Taluka, Godavari dt, British India
- Died: 8 December 2014 (aged 87) Visakhapatnam, India
- Genre: Indian Classical Music
- Occupation: classical vocalist
- Years active: 1945–2014
- Labels: Kosmik, PM Audios & Entertainments, Sanskriti
- Website: Official website

Nedunuri Krishnamurthy (Telugu: నేదునూరి కృష్ణమూర్తి;10 October 1927 – 8 December 2014) was an Indian Carnatic vocalist. He was awarded the Madras Music Academy's Sangeetha Kalanidhi in 1991.

== Early life ==
Krishnamurthy was born in 1927 in Kothapalli, Pithapuram Taluka, Godavari district of Andhra Pradesh in what was then British India to Rama Murthy Panthulu and Vijayalakshmi.

His father held a minor job at the estate of the Raja of Pithapuram. He was under influence of his mother who sang Ashtapadis, Tarangas and the Adhyatma Ramayana kritis. She had a great influence on him while growing up.

Krishnamurthy joined the Maharaja's Music College at Vizianagaram in the year 1940 and received initial training in Violin and Vocal from the Dwaram Narasinga Rao Naidu. In 1949, he was influenced by carnatic vocalist, Sripada Pinakapani, and under his guidance developed his style of music.

== Performing career ==
Krishnamurthy worked as Principal of S. V. College of Music and Dance, Tirupati; M. R. Government College of Music and Dance, Vizianagaram; Government College of Music and Dance, Secunderabad; and retired as Principal of G. V. R. Government College of Music and Dance, Vijayawada in 1985. Nedunuri's performances are characterised by adherence to tradition and his alapanas are renowned for capturing the essence of important Carnatic ragas. He formed a popular partnership with the renowned violinist, Lalgudi Jayaraman, and the performances of the duo are much admired by listeners.

He was Dean of Faculty of the Fine Arts and Chairman of Board of Studies in Music of Sri Venkateswara University and Nagarjuna University. He contributed to Annamacharya Project of the TTD (Tirumala Tirupati Devasthanams) in tuning most of the Annamacharya kritis as we know them today.

Krishna Gana Sabha, Madras, conferred on Nedunuri the title 'Sangeetha Choodamani' in 1976. The Music Academy, Madras conferred on him the most prestigious title of 'Sangeeta Kalanidhi' in 1991.

He was named 'Asthana Vidwan' of the Tirumala Tirupati Devasthanams and also of Sri Kanchi Kamakoti Peetham.

=== Prominent disciples ===
1. Domada Chittabbayi
2. Garimella Balakrishna Prasad
3. Shobha Raju
4. Saraswati Vidyardhi
5. Malladi Brothers
6. Sarada Subramanyam
7. Seshulatha Viswanath
8. Dr. Dwaram V.K.G.Tyagaraj
9. N Ch Pardhasaradhi
10. T. Sreenidhi
11. Sattiraju Venumadhav
12. Chaitanya Brothers ( Venkateswara Sharma & Krishnamacharyulu)
13. Neetha Chandrasekhar
14. Lalitha Chandrasekhar
15. Lahari Kolachela
16. Subba Narasiah

== Death ==
Nedunuri Krishnamurthy died on 8 December 2014 at Visakhapatnam, aged 87, while undergoing treatment for lung cancer.

== Albums & Songs ==
Year	Album	Language	Song	Co-singer(s)	Lyrics	Music composer	Record label
2019	Hari Samarpana	Telugu	"Tirumantramu Jeevanamu"	Malladi Brothers	Kaiwara Sri Yogi Nareyana	Nedunuri Krishnamurthy	PM Audios & Entertainments
2019	Hari Samarpana	Telugu	"Edigo Tirupati Kaashi"	Malladi Brothers	Kaiwara Sri Yogi Nareyana	Nedunuri Krishnamurthy	PM Audios & Entertainments
2019	Hari Samarpana	Telugu	"Jeeva Neevidhi Kaanava"	Malladi Brothers	Kaiwara Sri Yogi Nareyana	Nedunuri Krishnamurthy	PM Audios & Entertainments
2019	Hari Samarpana	Telugu	"Daasa Dasaanu Daasulaka"	Malladi Brothers	Kaiwara Sri Yogi Nareyana	Nedunuri Krishnamurthy	PM Audios & Entertainments
2019	Hari Samarpana	Telugu	"Mohamelaputane"	Malladi Brothers	Kaiwara Sri Yogi Nareyana	Nedunuri Krishnamurthy	PM Audios & Entertainments
2019	Hari Samarpana	Telugu	"Yogi Gunamulu Raajayogike Telusu"	Malladi Brothers	Kaiwara Sri Yogi Nareyana	Nedunuri Krishnamurthy	PM Audios & Entertainments
2019	Hari Samarpana	Telugu	"Devudu Thanalo Dandiguntudu"	Malladi Brothers	Kaiwara Sri Yogi Nareyana	Nedunuri Krishnamurthy	PM Audios & Entertainments

== Discography ==
- Annamayya Antaranga Tharangam
- Annamayya Pada Kadambam
- Annamayya Pada Kamalam
- Annamayya Pada Neerajanam
- Annamayya Pada Ravali
- Annamayya Pada Sammohanam
- Annamayya Pada Vasantham
- Pahi Nareyana by PM Audios & Entertainments
- Guru Upadesham by PM Audios & Entertainments
- Srihari Rasakrithi (TTD Release)
- Bhadrachala Ramadasu Keerthanalu (with Dasarathi Sataka Poems) (Alivelumanga Sarvayya Charitable Trust)
- Raga Sudha Rasam
- Rare Krithis of Tyagaraja
- Classical Treat by Nedunuri Krishnamurthy
- Raga Madhur (Audio) by Swathi Soft Solutions Company release
- Raga Ranjani (DVD) by Swathi Soft Solutions Company release

== Awards and honours ==
Item No	Organization	Award
01.	Sri Krishna Gana Sabha, Chennai	SANGEETHA CHOODAMANI, 1976
02.	Visakha Music Academy, Visakhapatham	SANGEETA KALASAGARA, 1980
03.	Sur Singar Samsad of Bombay	SWAR VILAS, 1981
04.	Sri Yagnavalka Cultural Association, Hyderabad	NADA SUDHA NIDHI, 1981
05.	Sangeetha Vidwat Sabha, Kakinada	GANA KALA NIDHI, 1982
06.	Sri Tulasivanam Sangeetha Parishad, Trivendrum	GAYAKA CHOODAMANI, 1982
07.	Sangeet Natak Akademi, New Delhi, Govt. of India	Sangeet Natak Akademi Award, 1986
08.	Sri Tyagaraja Swamy Trust, Tirupati	SAPTAGIRI SANGEETHA VIDWANMANI, 1987
09.	Sri Tyagaraja Kala Samithi	SANGEETHA VIDWANMANI, 1989
10.	Sriram Music Academy, Srinagar	SANGEETHA VIDYA BHASKARA, 1989
11.	Kalasagaram, Secunderabad	SANGEETHA KALA SAGARA, 1989
12.	Sangeetha Rasika Samakhya, Tirupati	NADA YOGI, 1989
13.	Santhi Renaissance International Foundation (SRI Foundation, USA)	SRI KALA PRAPURNA, 1991
14.	Madras Music Academy, Chennai	SANGITA KALANIDHI, 1991
15.	Bharathi Gana Sabha, Amalapuram	GANA KALA BHARATHI, 1993
16.	Govt. of Andhra Pradesh, Hyderabad	KALA NEERAJANA PURASKARAM, 1995
17.	Sri Annamacharya Project of North America, (SAPNA). Chicago, USA	ANNAMACHARYA VIDWANMANI, 1995
18.	Sri Sivanandaguru Educational and Cultural Trust, Bheemunipatham	GANGADEVI EMINENT CITIZEN AWARD, 1997
19.	World Teachers Trust, Visakhapatnam	MASTER M.N. AWARD, 1997
20.	Datta Peetham, Mysore	NADA NIDHI, 1998
21.	State Cultural Council, Govt. of Andhra Pradesh, Hyderabad	Hamsa Award, 1999
22.	Sangeetha Vidwat Sabha, Kakinada	ANNAMACHARYA BHARATHI, 1999
23.	Bhairavi, Indian Fine Arts Society, USA	SANGEETHA RATNAMARA, 2000
24.	Sri Venkateswara Annamacharya Society of America, California, USA	ANNAMACHARYA SANKEERTHANA KIREETI, 2000
25.	World Telugu Federation	TEULGU TALLI AWARD, 2000
26.	Bharatiya Vidyabhavan, Coimbatore Kendra	SANGEETH SAMRAT, 2001
27.	Fine Arts Cultural Themes, Sydney (FACTS) Australia	SWARA NIDHI, 2001
28.	Badam Apparao Memorial Trust, Pithapuram	BADAM APPARAO MEMORIAL TRUST AWARD, 2002
29.	Raja – Lakshmi Foundation, Chennai	RAJA LAKSHMI AWARD, 2002
30.	Telugu Fine Arts Society, New Jersey, USA	DR.K.V.RAO & JYOTHI RAO AWARD, 2002
31.	Andhra Music Academy	SANGITA VIDYANIDHI
32.	Prasara Bharati, New Delhi	NATIONAL ARTISTE AWARD, 2004
33.	South Indian Education Society, Mumbai	NATIONAL EMINENCE AWARD, 2006
34.	Visakha Music and Dance Academy	NADAVIDYA BHARATHI,
35.	Government of Andhra Pradesh	PRATIBHA RAJIV PURASKAR, 2006
36.	South Indian Cultural Association, Hyderabad	SANGITHA CHAKRAVARTHI,
37.	Academy of Music, Bangalore	K.K. MURTHY MEMORIAL CHOWEDIAH AWARD, 2008
38.	Shanmukhananda Sahba, Mumbai	NATIONAL EMINENCE AWARD, 2010
39.	Dr. B.R. Ambedkar Open University, Hyderabad, Andhra Pradesh	HONORARY DOCTORATE, 2010
40.	Tirumala Tirupati Devastanam, Tirupati	‘ASTHANA VIDWAN’ of TTD, 2010.
42.	Sri Durga Malleswarala Vari Devastanam, Vijayawada.	‘ASTHANA VIDWAN’, 2010.
43.	Sri Krishna Gana Sabha, Chennai.	‘SRI TYAGARAJA SEVA RATNAM’, 2011.
44.	Music Academy, Madras 1998	Best Raga Rendering
45.	Music Academy, Madras	Best Senior Vocalist (2 times)
46.	Indian Fine Arts Society, Madras, 1989.	Best Senior Vocalist
47.	Indian Fine Arts Society, Madras, 1989.	Sangeetha Kalasikhamani, 2011.
48.	Sangeet Natak Akademi, New Delhi	Sangeet Natak Akademi Tagore Ratna, 2011.
49.	Raghavendra Swamy Matham, Mantralayam.	‘SRI PURANDARESHWARA THYAGARAJA', 2012.
50.	Central Sangeeth Natak Academy, New Delhi	‘TAGORE ACADEMY AWARD’, 2012.
51.	GiTAM University, Visakhapatnam	‘DOCTORATE’, 2013.
52.	Kopparapu Kavula Kalapeetham, Visakhapatnam	‘KOPPARAPU KAVULA PRATHIBHA PURASKARAM’, 2013.
53.	Samagana Mathanga, Bangalore	‘SAMAGANA MATHANGA NATIONAL AWARD’, 2014.
54.	South Indian Cultural Association Planjery Foundation	‘SANGEETHA BRIHASPATI AWARD’, 2014.
