= Sripada Pinakapani =

Indian doctor and musician (1913–2013)

- Born: 3 August 1913
- Origin: Srikakulam, Andhra Pradesh, India
- Died: 11 March 2013 (aged 99)
- Genre: Indian Classical Music
- Occupations: Classical Vocalist
- Years active: 1930–2006

Sripada Pinakapani (3 August 1913 – 11 March 2013), was a medical doctor, professor of medicine, administrator, and Carnatic musician. He received the Sangita Kalanidhi award in 1983.

== Early life and career ==
Pinkapani was born in Priya Agraharam in the Srikakulam district. He spent three months at violin maestro Dwaram Venkataswamy Naidu's school. He began his M.B.B.S. studies in 1932 and completed his M.D. in general medicine in December 1945 at Andhra Medical College, under Andhra University, Visakhapatnam.

Pinakapani worked as assistant professor at Madras Medical College from 1944 to 1949 and later at Andhra Medical College. He opted for Andhra Services and resigned to rejoin in the same post in 1951. He held the position of Professor of Medicine on 17 May 1954 and later transferred to Kurnool Medical College on 26 January 1957 and retired in the same position on 2 August 1968.

Pinkapani had a successful career performing at major festivals and concerts. His disciples include carnatic vocalists, Nedunuri Krishnamurthy, Nookala Chinna Satyanarayana, Voleti Venkatesvarulu, Srirangam Gopalaratnam, the Malladi Brothers, Dr.N Ch Pardhasaradhi and many others. He wrote several books on carnatic music and Gaanakalasarvasvamu ran multiple volumes which had every minute detail of krithis. He is the paternal grandfather of singer Chinmayi Sripada.

He died on 11 March 2013 in Kurnool, Andhra Pradesh, at the age of 99, a few months short of completing 100.

== Awards ==
- He was awarded Gyana Vidya Vardhi by Tirumala Tirupati Devasthanams on 3 August 2012 on the occasion of his 99th birthday.
- He received the title of Sangeetha Kalanidhi (Treasure for the art of music).
- He received the Sangeetha Kalasikhamani award in 1970 bestowed on him by The Indian Fine Arts Society, Chennai.
- He has been honoured with Sangeet Natak Akademi Award in 1983 in 1977.
- He was awarded Padma Bhushan by Government of India in 1984.
- Andhra University honored him with Kala Prapoorna in 1978.
- He was honoured with Sangeet Natak Akademi Tagore Ratna in 2011

== Books written ==
- Sangeetha Sourabhamu, (vol 1 – 4)
- Sangeetha Yatra
- Mela Raga malika
- Manodharma sangeetham
- Pallavi Gana sudha
