= Mani Madhava Chakyar =

Indian actor (1899–1990)

Nāṭyācārya Padma Śrī Mani Madhava Chakyar Vidūṣakaratnaṁ
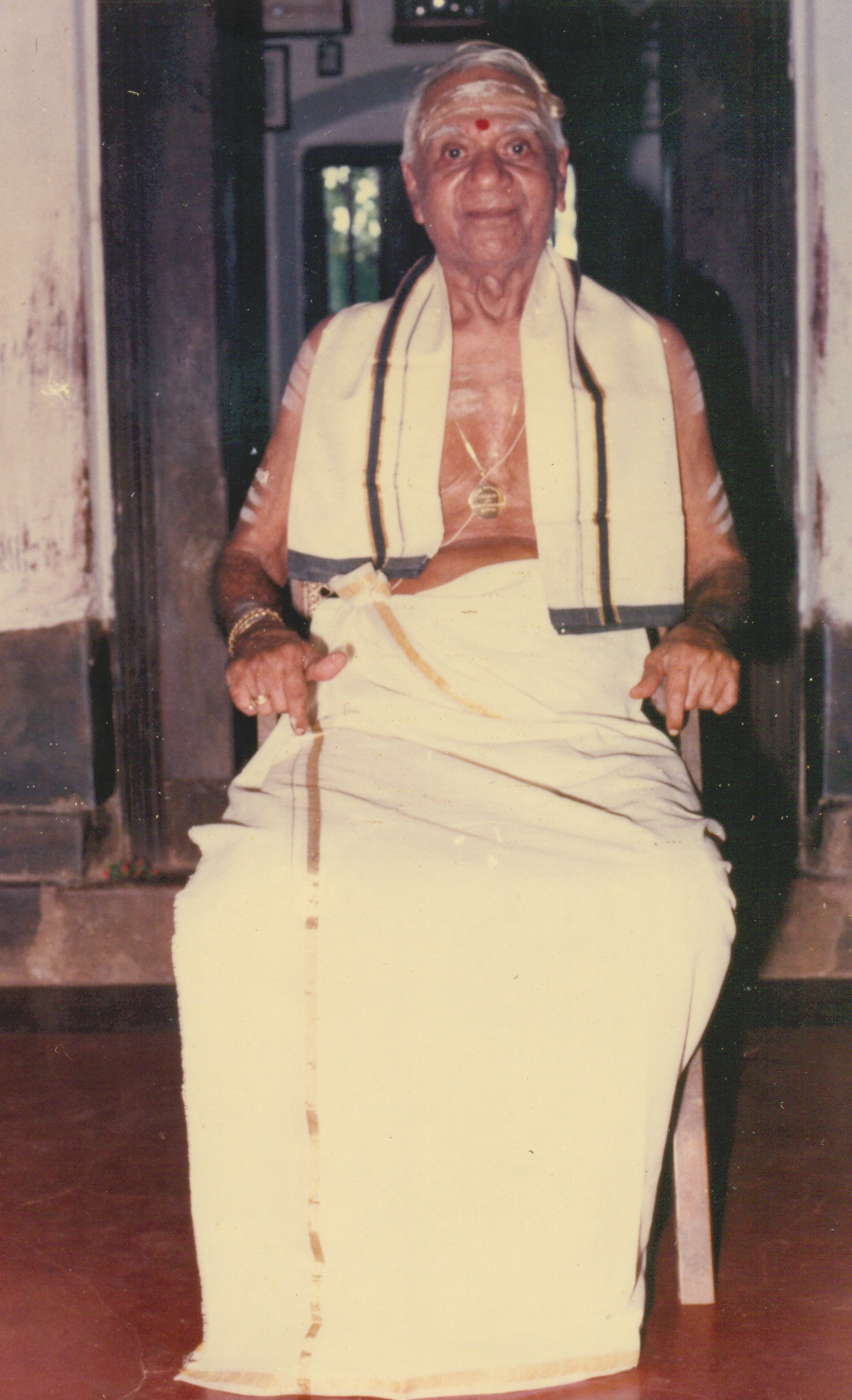
- Mani Madhava Chakyar
- Born: 15 February 1899; Karayad,Perambra Kozhikode, British India (present-day Kerala, India)
- Died: 14 January 1990 (aged 90); Ottappalam, Kerala, India
- Years active: 1910–1990
- Spouse: P. K. Kunjimalu Nangiaramma
- Awards: 1964: Sangeet Natak Akademi Award; 1964: Paderewski Foundation (New York) Certificate of Merit; 1974: Padma Shri; 1975: Kerala Sahitya Akademi Award; 1976: Kerala Sangeetha Nataka Akademi Fellowship; 1982: Sangeet Natak Akademi Fellowship; 1982: Govt. of India Emeritus Fellowship; 1982: Kalidasa Academy Fellowship; 1983: Kerala Kalamandalam Fellowship; 1987: Tulsi Samman; 1991: Guruvayoorappan Sammanam

Guru Mani Madhava Chakyar (IAST: Māṇi Mādhava Cākyār) (15 February 1899 – 14 January 1990) was an Indian performance artist and Sanskrit scholar from Kerala, considered to be the greatest Chakyar Koothu and Koodiyattam (ancient Sanskrit drama theatre tradition) artist and authority of modern times. He was considered as the authority of Abhinaya (the classical Indian acting style) and Nātyaśāstra.

Known as "the Emperor of Rasa-Abhinaya", he was a practitioner of Rasa-Abhinaya. His Netrābhinaya was widely recognized, and he was noted for his use of facial expression, particularly the eyes, in performance. He was versed in the traditional Koodiyattams and the prabandhas used in Chakyar Koothu. He explained the concepts, methods, and practices of Koodiyattam and Chakyar Koothu in detail. He had studied the Nātyaśāstra of Bharata Muni, as well as the acting traditions of Kerala. He had knowledge of both the theory and practice of Koodiyattam, and was a teacher and practitioner of these art forms and Sanskrit.

He was the first one to take Koodiyattam and Chakyar Koothu outside the precincts of the temples of Kerala to all over India and to impart training in Kudiyattam to non-Chakyar disciples including foreigners. He had produced many disciples in Kutiyattam and other classical arts like Kathakali. He was a Sanskrit scholar and was used to give lectures and talks in Sanskrit.

He is the author of Nātyakalpadrumam – an encyclopaedic treatise on all aspects of Koodiyattam. He was a Fellow of national art academies including Sangeet Natak Akademi and recipient of coveted titles like "Nātyāchārya", "Vidūshakaratnam" and awards including Padma Shri and Sangeet Natak Akademi Award.

== Early life and education ==
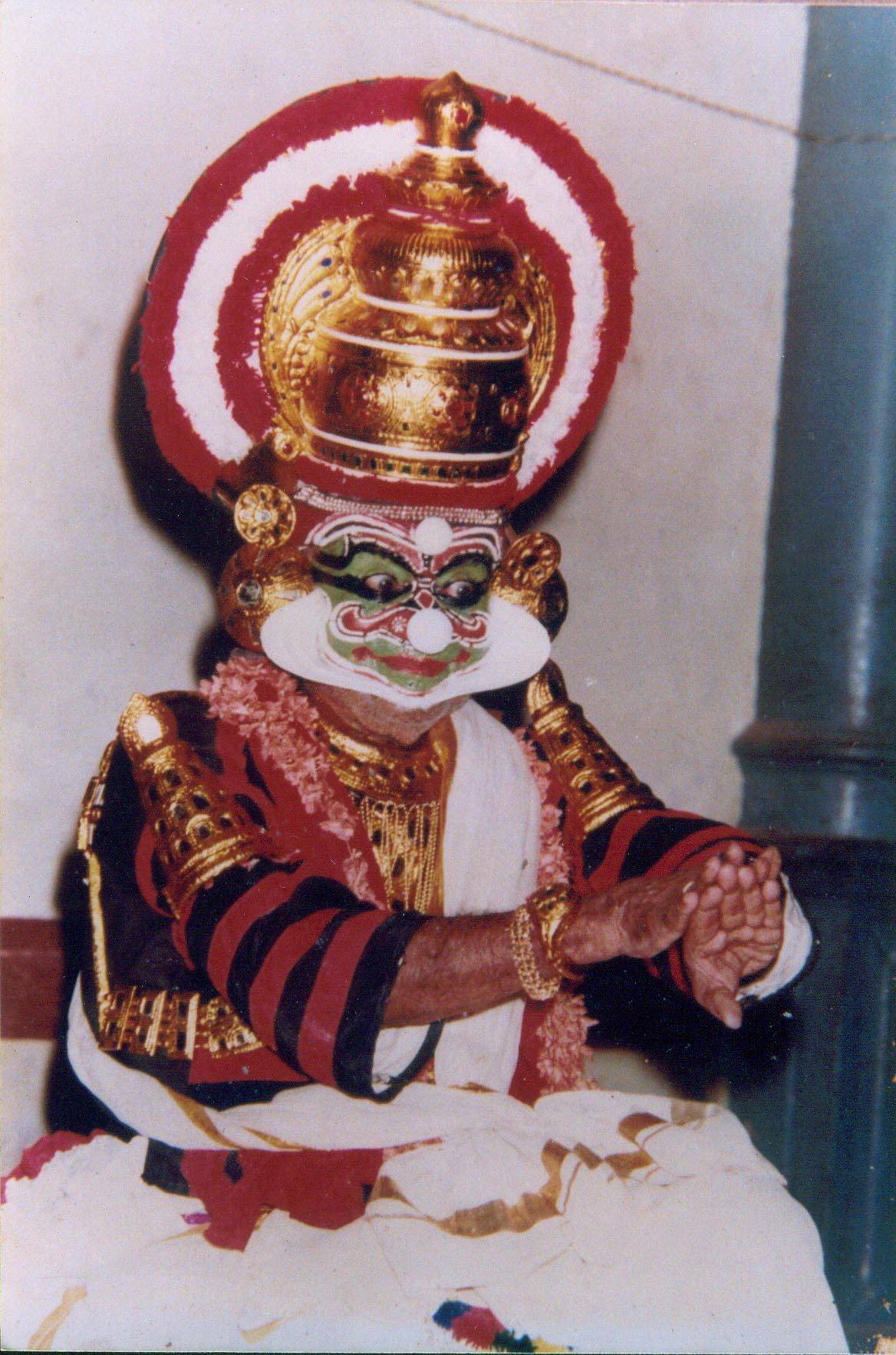
Chakyar as Ravana, at the age of 89, at Tripunithura. It was one of his last public Koodiyattam performances

Mani Madhava Chakyar was born on 15 February 1899, in his ancestral home at Thiruvangayoor near Karayad, near Perambra of Kozhikode district of Kerala. His father was Vishnu Sarma and mother was Savithri Illotamma. He belonged to the Mani family of Chakyars of North Kerala, who for centuries have been the custodians of Koodiyattam – the traditional Sanskrit theatre - and Chakyar Koothu, another classical art form based on Sanskrit Champu Kavyas.

He trained in Chakyar Koothu and Koodiyattam in traditional way, under the direct guidance of his uncles who were great scholars and masters of these art forms. They were Guru Māni Parameswara Chakyar, Guru Māni Neelakandha Chakyar and Guru Māni Narayana Chakyar. He belonged to the "Mani" tradition of Koodiyattam and Chakyar Koothu which gives importance to both Rasa-abhinaya and Vachika-abhinaya.

Chakyar was a Sanskrit scholar and gave lectures in Sanskrit. He studied Alankarashastra, Nātyaśāstra, Vyakarana, Nyaya, Jyotisha, etc. in the traditional way, under scholars such as Panditaratnam Pazhedathu Sankaran Nampoothiripad. He was the student of Darsanakalanidhi Rama Varma Parikshith Thampuran (the Maharaja of Cochin). He had his higher studies in Nyayashastra and Natya Shastra under him. Chakyar taught Sanskrit at Balakollasini Sanskrita Pathasala of Killikkurussimangalam.

His first performance (Arangettam) of Koodiyattam was at the age of 14 at Trikkaikkunnu Temple of North Kottayam of Malabar. He performed the huge number of Atiyantara koothus of Mani family (the koothus which are assigned to the family from ancient times) in large number of temples stretching from Malabar to Thrissur. It consist of all devotional ritualistic Koothus and Kudiyattams including Anguliyanka, Mattavilasa Prahasana, Mantranka, Ezhamanka (seventh act of Ascharyachoodamani) about eight decades continuously in temples of Kerala. It includes ancient Kerala temples such as Matayikkavu Bhagavathi Temple of Kannoor, Taliparamba Rajarajeshwara Temple, Kottiyoor Perumal Temple, Lokanarkavu Temple of Vatakara, Thali (Tali) Siva Temple of Kozhikode, Thirunavaya Navamukunda temple, Thiruvegappura Sree Mahadeva Temple, Pandamangalam Krishna temple of Kottakkal, Kotakkal Vishwambhara (Shiva) temple, Kallekkulagara Emoor Siva temple, Triprayar Sri Rama temple, Peruvanam Shiva temple of Cherpu, Avittathur Shiva Temple etc. Chakyar won high renown for the artistry of his performance in these temples, as well as in many others.

He married P. K. Kunjimalu Nangiaramma, the daughter of his uncle, Mani Parameshwara Chakyar. She was an exponent in female characters of Kudiyattams and Nangiǎr Kūthu and various Ragas and Shlokas used for the art form. She used to accompany him in the performances.

== Master of Rasa-Abhinaya ==
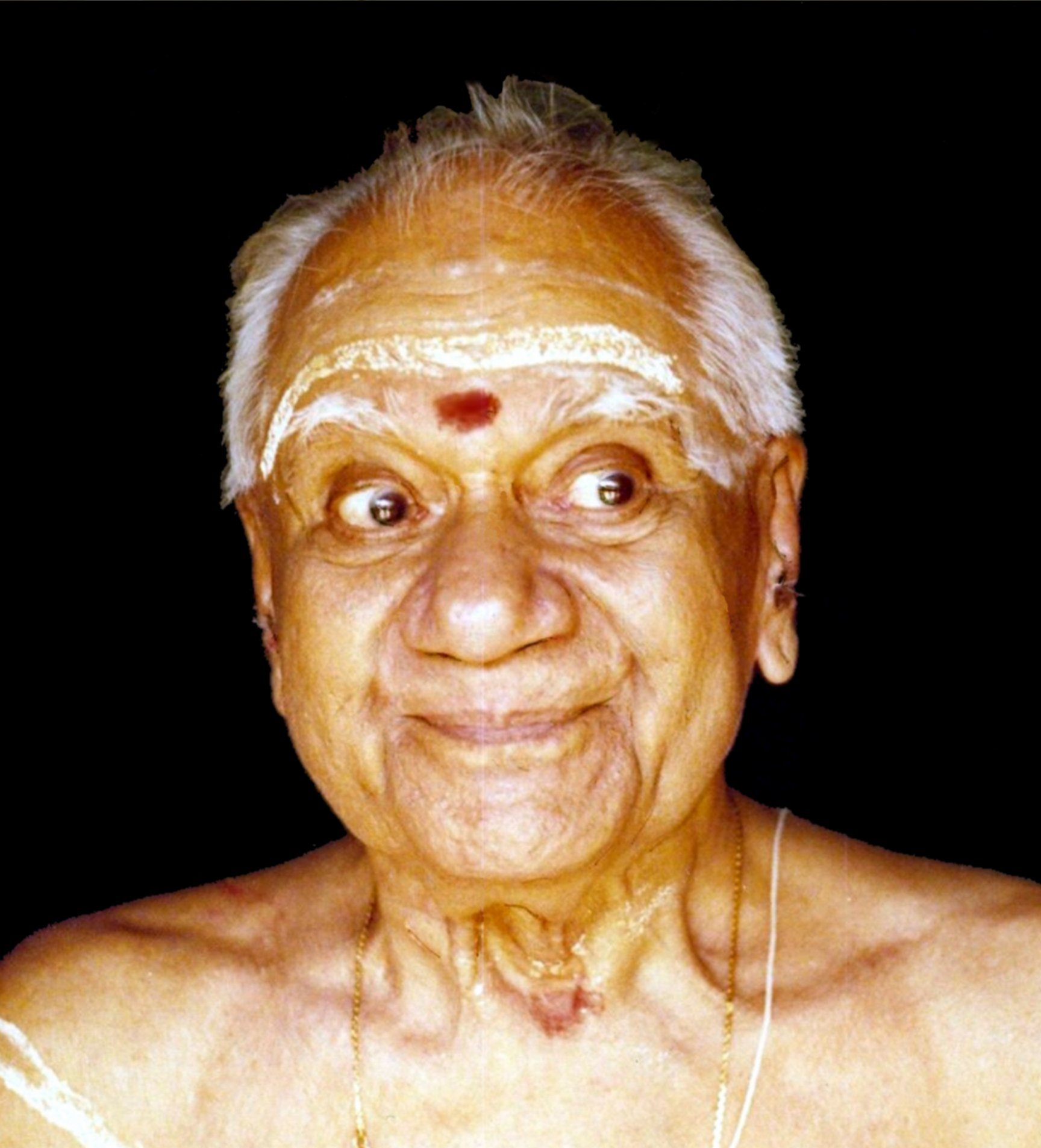
Sringāra Rasa-abhinaya of Guru Māni Mādhava Chākyār.

He is considered as the all-time master of Rasa-abhinaya (enacting sentiments in their perfection) with special reference to Netrābhinaya (enacting sentiments, etc. through the beautiful and masterly movements of eyes only). He was thought to be exceptionally well in the field of Satwika-Abhinaya. He is considered as "one of the most wonderful theatre actors of the last century".

He was known for his roles (which has importance of Satvika-Abhinaya in Koodiyattams) like Ravana (Katti vesha), Arjuna (Pacha vesha), Udayana (Pacha vesha), Jeemootavahana (Pazhukka vesha) etc.

His abhinaya of Kailasoddhārana (lifting of Kailasa) and Pārvatī Viraha (separation of Pārvatī), enriched with the Netrabinaya and Pakarnnaattam – Abhinaya (actor playing the role of another or more than one character shifting constantly without changing costume), were widely acclaimed.

He was known for the abhinaya of the slokas like "sikhinishalabham.." of the play Subhadradhananjayam by playing it with mere eyes. He was able to act in detail the Moths falling in and out of the lamp fire by evoking his Netrabhinaya, with assigning different rasa's for female moth, male moth and the fire. Guru's Abhinaya of the shloka smaramyavandhyadhipateh sutayah (स्मराम्यवन्त्यािधपतेः सुतायाः) from Bhasa's Swapnavasawadattam is also widely acclaimed one.

== Reforming the art form ==
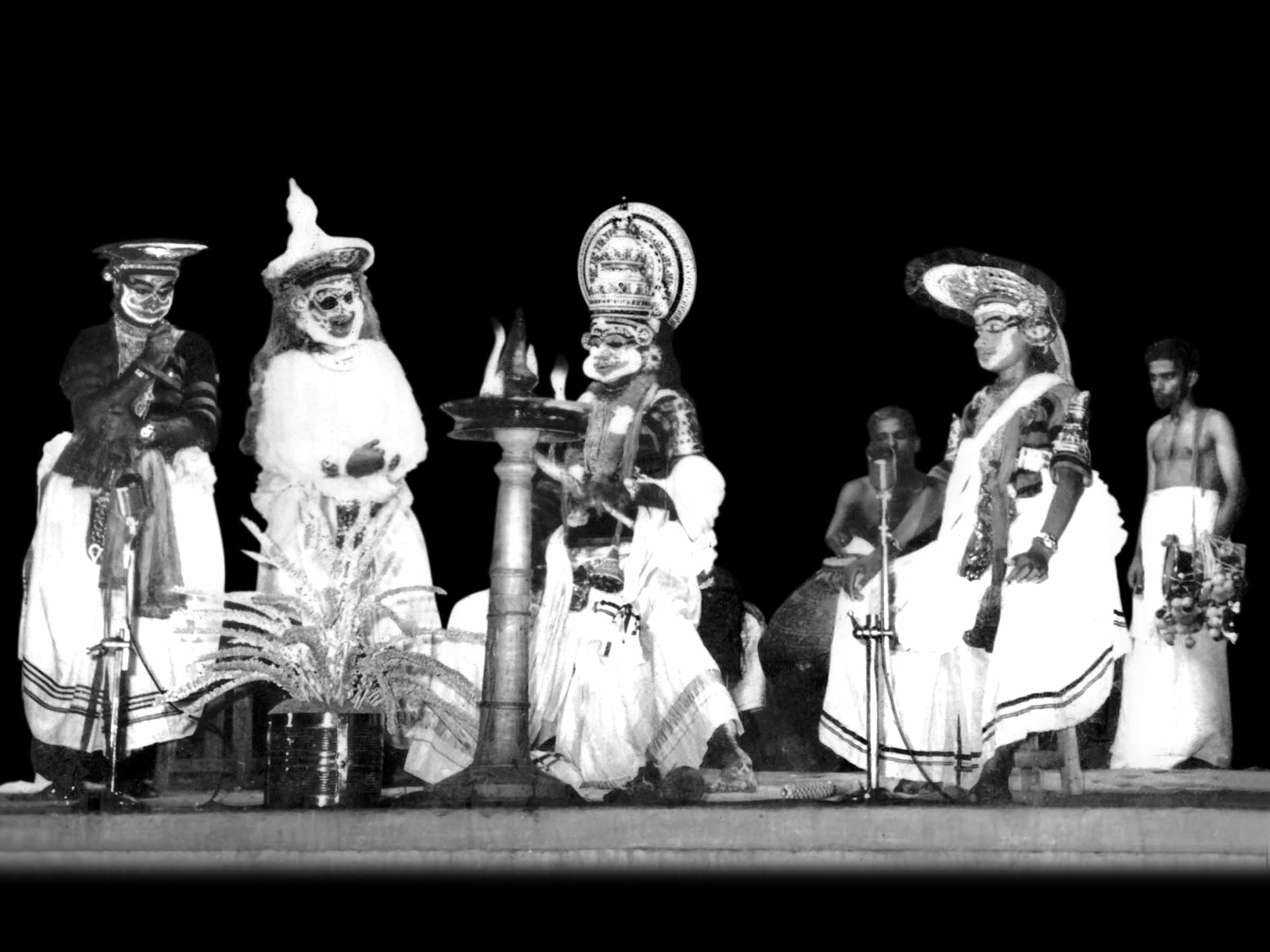
Chakyar and his troop performing Thoranayudham Koodiyattam (1962– Chennai). It was the first Koodiyattam performance outside Kerala. Mani Madhava Chakyar as Ravana, Mani Neelakandha Chakyar as Hanuman, Mani Damodara Chakyar as Vibhishana & PK.G Nambiar as Shankukarna.

In 1949 he performed Chakyar Koothu for All India Radio, which was the first time the art was performed outside Koothambalam. In 1955, under his leadership, Kutiyattam was performed outside the temple for the first time in his village at Killikkurussimangalam. For performing the art forms outside the temples he faced lot of objections from the Chakyar community. In an interview, he remembered

My own people condemned my action (performing Koothu and Kutiyattam outside the precincts of the temples), Once, after I had given performances at Vaikom, they even thought about excommunicating me. I desired that this art should survive the test of time. That was precisely why I ventured outside the temple.

In 1962, under the leadership of V. Raghavan- an art and Sanskrit scholar - Sanskrit Ranga of Madras invited Chakyar to perform Kutiyattam there. This was the first time Kutiyattam was performed outside Kerala by his troupe. They performed at Madras on three nights, showing Kutiyattam scenes from three plays: Abhiṣeka, Subhadrādhanañjaya and Nāgānanda. Chakyar's performance made great impact on the people and art critics so that the artform and Chakyar himself became known outside Kerala. He was then invited to perform Kutiyattam at various places in North India during 1964, such as New Delhi and Banaras.

After Chakyar's first tour to New Delhi, he was awarded the Sangeet Natak Akademi Award in 1964 for his contributions to Chakyar Koothu and Kutiyattam. This was his first national recognition.

He performed Kudiyattam all over India and popularised the same. He along with his troop did Koodiyattam performance in places like Madras (1962, 1973 & 1977), Madhura (1962), New Delhi (1964, 1966, 1974, 1979 & 1983), Varanasi (1964 & 1979), Bombay (1973 & 1977), Ujjain (1982), Bhopal (1987) etc.

The President of India, Sarvepalli Radhakrishnan, invited him to perform Kutiyattam at Rashtrapati Bhavan in 1964 and was impressed by his exceptional acting skill. His Kutiyattam performances, lectures and demonstrations at well-known centres such as the Madras Music Academy, the International Centre for Kathakali in New Delhi, the Experimental Theatre in New Delhi and Bombay and the National Centre for the Performing Arts in Bombay brought him wide popularity and recognition.

He choreographed and directed acts of the plays like Kalidasa's Abhijñānaśākuntala, Vikramorvaśīya and Mālavikāgnimitra; Bhasa's Swapnavāsavadatta and Pancharātra; Harsha's Nagananda for the first time in the history of Koodiyattam. He along with his troupe performed these Kutiyattams all over India.

When his guru, Rama Varma Parikshith Thampuran, wrote a new Sanskrit champu prabandha called Prahlādacharita and requested senior artists to study and perform the same on the Chakyar Koothu stage, they said it was impossible for them to stage such a new prabandha. Then Thampuran asked Chakyar, who was then a comparatively young artist, to try. He agreed and studied a part of the prabandha within one night and performed the same on the next day at Tripunithura – the then capital of Cochin state (1962). The incident made the scholars to accept his mastery over both Sanskrit and the classical art form. After some months, he performed entire Prahlādacharita at the same stage.

He performed Chakyar Koothu and Koodiyattam for All India Radio and Doordarshan for the first time, which helped to attract thousands of listeners to these traditional art forms. It was he who started demonstrations in Kudiyattam to popularise the same.

== Teaching ==
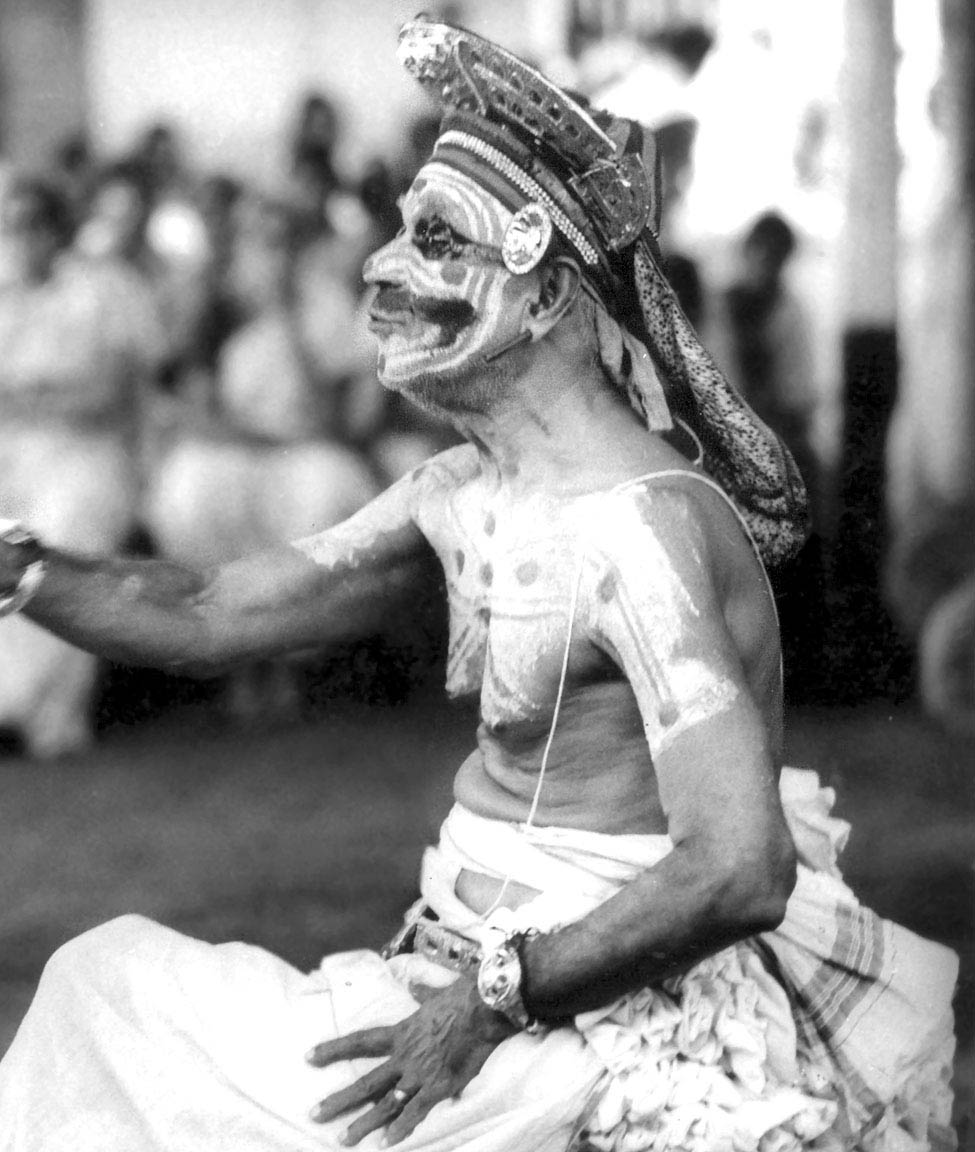
Guru Mani Madhava Chakyar performing Chakyar Koothu

He is considered the greatest guru of Kutiyattam of the modern times, producing many accomplished disciples. He taught Koodiyattam for the first time to a non-Chakyar – Nambiar caste member. He was a Polish student named Maria Christopher Byrski (currently at Department of Indology, Warsaw University), who was then a research student at Banaras Hindu University, came to study the only surviving ancient Sanskrit drama Koodiyattam, from Guru around the early 1960s. He stayed at Guru Mani Madhava Chakyar's home and studied Koodiyattam in its traditional Gurukula way. Lot of research scholars came to study the Sanskrit drama from the ultimate exponent of Kutiyattam and Abhinaya Mani Madhava Cakyar. Dr. Farley Richmond (University of Georgia, USA), noted Sanskrit drama scholar also studied about the ancient Sanskrit art form under Mani Madhava Chakyar by staying at his home at Killikkurussimangalam. He had filmed Rasa Abhinaya and Kutiyattam of the maestro. Kamaladevi Chattopadhyay of All-India Handicrafts Board came to Guru Maani Madhava Cakyar's home to do research about the costumes used in Kutiyattam (Ahāryābhinaya) (1967). Indian theatre scholar Goverdhan Panjal (National School of Drama) studied about Koothambalams and Kutiyattam under the Guru (1975).

When Kerala Kalamandalam (a school for the performing arts) was founded by Vallathol Narayana Menon, he invited authority of Rasa-abhinaya, Mani Madhava Chakyar as the master trainer for Rasa-abhinaya to the Kathakali students. Later Kathakali Yogam- Katathandu, Kerala Kalamandalam, PSV Natyasangham- Kottakkal and Gandhi Seva Sadanam Kathakali Academy- Perur used his services as visiting professor of Rasa-abhinaya and taught advanced students in Kathakali and Kutiyattam.

He is known as "the master who gave eyes to Kathakali". His influence on the classical performing arts of Kerala is famous. Many Koodiyattam, Kathakali, Bharatanatyam and Mohiniyattam artists were trained by this great master. Kathakali artists including legendary Kalamandalam Krishnan Nair, Guru Kelu Nair, Guru Anand Shivram, Guru Kalamandalam Madhavan, Guru Gopinath, Sadanam Krishnankutty are his disciples.

Guru, who was an eminent teacher and performer opened a Gurukulam (training centre) in 1982 for teaching Kutiyattam, Chakyar Koothu, Nangyar Koothu and related art forms at Killikkurussimangalam (Lakkidi). After Guru's death it was named as Padmasree Mani Madhava Chakyar Smaraka Gurukulam in memory of the Guru. This institution still keeps its tradition and plays a major role in Kutiyattam teaching, revival and performance.

Guru, who had dedicated his life to Kutiyattam was concerned about the fate of this classical art form. Māni Mādhava Chākyār's conversation with famous Bharatanatyam dancer Rukmini Devi Arundale, when she visited Guru at his residence a year before his death, reflects his anxiety

At least Bharatanatyam is now world famous, with thousands of new votaries. What about Koodiyattam?.....I have done what I can. It has not been easy. One has to sacrifice a lot to learn Koodiyattam. How many persons will be ready for it these days? Will there be an audience capable of imbibing it?

== Awards and honours ==
Mani Madhava Chakyar received many titles, awards and degrees. He is one of the most felicitated artist from Kerala. His first major recognition came from HH Bhattan Thampuran (Bhatta Raja) of Kodungallur Kovilakam himself at the age of 22. Bhattan Thampuran awarded him with a Mudramothiram (signed ring) (1921). Mani Madhava Chakyar considered this Mudramothiram as the prestigious award that he ever got.

He received the most prestigious sacred Vīrasringhala or Veerashringhala (It's a kind of Golden Bracelet, given to the greatest artist/scholar of that era) from Taliparamba Rajarajeshwara Temple (1923). He is the youngest one to receive this award, which is being given to the scholars of the supreme rank, only by the unanimous approval of a special body of temple consisting of eminent scholars. Till date no one else has received a Veerashringhala from there after Mani Madhava Chakyar. Another major Vīrasringhalas that he received are; from Valiya Thampuran of Kottakkal Kovilakam (1952), from Urpassikkavu of Thalassery, from Jagadguru Shri Shankaracharya of Kanchi Kamakoti Peetham (1961), from Samoothiri Raja of Kozhikode, given at the eve of Koodiyattam performance at Guruvayur Sree Krishna Temple (1964) and from Tripunithura Kovilakam (1989).

He was honoured with ponnada (a kind of silk cloth given as a gesture of honour and respect) from Maharani (Queen) Of Travancore, presented through Mahakavi Ulloor S. Parameswara Iyer at Vaikom Mahadeva Temple. He was honoured by HH. Rajah of Palakkad with a Keshabharam Kireetam at Hemambika Temple of Kallekkulangara (1962). He has received Gold Medals from Valiya Raja of Katathanadu, Pallikkunnu Bhagavathy Temple of Kannoor, Avittathur (1962), Delhi Experimental theatre (1964) etc.

In 1930, he was awarded the title Nātyāchārya (Guru of Natya) by Kadathanadu Valiya Thampuran (Raja of Kadathanadu). He received the title Vidūshakaratna, again from the Taliparamba Rajarajeshwara Temple (1954) for his excellence in performing "vidūshaka" in Koodiyattams. He was honoured by Fine Arts Society of Kochi by giving the title Anushtanakalapravina.

Government of India conferred Padma Shri (1974) and Emeritus Fellowship (1982) on him. He was conferred by an honorary degree from Banaras Hindu University in 1964.

He has received major National and International Awards and Fellowships such as

- 1964 – Sangeet Natak Akademi Award (New Delhi) - first national recognition for a Koodiyattam/Chakyar Koothu artist.
- 1964 – Paderewski Foundation (New York) Certificate of Merit – first international recognition for Koodiyattam.
- 1974 – Padma Shri
- 1975 – Kerala Sahitya Akademi Award – for the book Nātyakalpadrumam
- 1975 – Kerala Sangeetha Nataka Akademi Fellowship
- 1982 – Sangeet Natak Akademi Fellowship (New Delhi)
- 1982 – Government of India Emeritus Fellowship
- 1982 – Kalidasa Academy Fellowship (Ratna Sadasyata) (1982)
- 1983 – Kerala Kalamandalam Fellowship
- 1987 – Tulsi Samman of Govt. of Madhya Pradesh
- 1991 – Guruvayoor Devaswam Award etc.

He was the first Chakyar Koothu and Koodiyattam artist to receive these.

He has received numerous Honours and Certificates from distinguished institutions and individuals such as Akhila Bharata Sanskrit Sammelan (World Sanskrit Conference) – New Delhi, Samskrita Ranga – Chennai, Fifth World Sanskrit Conference – Banaras, Dr.S. Radhakrishnan, Dr. Vibhuti Narayan Singh (Maharaja of Kasi), Satyanarayana Sinha, Bishnu Ram Medhi (Chief Minister of Assam), Sir C.P. Ramaswami Iyer, Maharaja of Kollengode, Vallathol Narayana Menon, Dr. V. Raghavan, Rukmini Devi Arundale, Dr. V.K Narayana Menon, Dr.Kapila Vatsyayan etc. etc.

Even though Guru Mani Madhava Chakkiyar received lot of national recognitions art critics widely believe that he truly deserved a lot more and recognitions came very late. RKG (Editor, The Illustrated Weekly, Columnist for Times of India) observes,

..I felt angry when I learnt that a great artist like Mani Madhava Chakyar was awarded a mere Padma Shri. A man of his artistic genius and erudition deserved to be decorated with the highest state honour (Bharat Ratna)

== Publications ==
He has written an authoritative, award-winning book (in Malayalam) on Koodiyattam called Nātyakalpadrumam (1975). This work is being used as a reference by scholars and students. Natyakalpadrumam deals with all aspects of Koodiyattam in a scientific and critical manner. This book is considered the encyclopaedia of Koodiyattam. It won the prestigious Kerala Sahitya Akademi Award (1976). This book is translated into Hindi by Sangeet Natak Akademi of New Delhi.

One of his other book is Matha Vilasam (Mattavilasam 1968), the choreography and play part (actor's manual – Attaprakara) used in Mattavilasaprahasana Kudiyattam. He wrote the Attaprakaras of Abhijñānaśākuntala, Swapnavāsavadatta, Vikramorvaśīya, Mālavikāgnimitra, Pancharātra and Nagananda (Not published).

His biography (in Malayalam), Mani Madhaveeyam (1999) was published by Department of Cultural Affairs Publications of the Government of Kerala. This book showcased his achievements and contributions towards the arts.

Guru has written articles in various journals and presented number of papers in conferences on various aspects of Koodiyattam, Abhinaya, Raagas, Natyasastra, Chakyar Koothu, Rasābhinaya in Kathakali etc.

== Films and documentaries ==
There are several films and documentaries featuring Chakyar's Rasa-Abhinaya, Koodiyattam performances and life.

- Mani Madhava Chakyar: The Master at Work (1994, English, Kavalam Narayana Panikar, Central Sangeet Natak Academy, New Delhi) is a biographical film on the life and work of Chakyar. The film contains an interview with Chakyar where he explains the difficulty he had to face from hardliners when he took the traditional art forms outside temple for the first time in 1949. The film contains a session focussed on Rasa abhinaya by Chakyar, where he enacts various Rasas.
- Parvati Viraham: Mani Madhava Chakyar as Ravana (1993, English, Central Sangeet Natak Academy, New Delhi) features Chakyar as Ravana in the Pārvatī Viraham (separation of Pārvatī) in Koodiyattam form. It shows the Pārvatī Viraham part of the Ascharyachodamani Kutiyattam and includes the Pakarnnattam abhinaya.
- Manifestations of Shiva (1980, English, Malcolm Leigh & Stella Kramrisch, Philadelphia Museum of Art, Asia Society, USA) is a critically acclaimed documentary film; wherein Chakyar has performed as Lord Siva in Classical Indian dance form.
- Kutiyattam - Sanskrit Theater of India (2002, English, Multimedia CD, Farley Richmond (University of Georgia), The University of Michigan Press, USA) contains rare videos of Chakyar's Rasa Abhinaya including glimpses of his Netrabhinaya. The CD also contains the audios of recital of Shlokas and play parts by him.
- Kudiattam (1986, Hindi, Prakash Jha, India) features Chakyar's abhinaya and shows him explaining the concepts of Kutiyattam and its abhinaya techniques. It also features him teaching etc. This film has won Indian government's National Film Award for Best Arts/Cultural Film (1987).
- Mani Madhava Chakkiar (1977, English, Classic Films) is a documentary film about Chakyar. It shows his Abhinaya in different Kutiyattams, his Chakyar Koothu performance etc. It also gives a picture of his personal life.
- Guru Mani Madhava Chakyar (2009, Malayalam, Krishnan Unni, Govt. of Kerala) is a documentary about the guru. This project is by Information and Public Relations Dept. of Govt. of Kerala as part of capturing the eminent personalities in Kerala and to highlight their contribution to the State.
- Prahladacharitham Chakyar Koothu (1986, audio, Harisree Audios, Kerala) features Chakyar Koothu performance of the prabandha Prahlādacharita, giving a glimpse into Chakyar's ability in narration and recital. It is unique because he did not perform Prahlādacharita after the death of his guru, Thampuran, in 1964, except for this recording.

Many of his Koodiyattam, Chakyar Koothu performances, demonstrations, interviews etc. were documented by Doordarshan centres of New Delhi, Bombay, Bhopal, Madras, Thiruvananthapuram etc. and All India Radio and is still being broadcast all over India. Documentation of Guru's Kutiyattam performance by Doordarshan Centre Bombai with English commentary of art critic and scholar V. K Narayana Menon is widely acclaimed.

== Death and legacy ==
The memorial to the Guru at his residence, that marks the spot of his cremation.

Chakyar died at the age of 90 on 14 January 1990 in a private hospital at Ottappalam due to natural causes. His body was cremated with full honours at his Killikkurussimangalam residence. There is a memorial at the spot of his cremation.

His birth and death anniversaries are celebrated by various cultural programmes, commemorative sessions and Kutiyattam festivals by various cultural organisations and institutes.

He is one of the most felicitated artist from Kerala and was the first recipient of all major awards for Chakyar Koothu and Koodiyattam. Kerala Sangeetha Nataka Akademi's annual Koodiyattam Award is known as Maani Madhava Puraskaram as a tribute to him.

Many of Chakyar's films are still screened regularly at art theatres across and outside India. His Kutiyattam and Chakyar Koothu performances and other documentaries are broadcast from major Doordarshan and All India Radio stations regularly (Guru himself had initiated performance of these art forms for these media for the first time).

Art and cultural festivals are organised by various associations as a dedication to Chakyar regularly.

== See also ==
- Thulall
