= Hāsya =

Hāsya (Sanskrit: हास्य) is a Sanskrit word for one of the nine rasas or bhava (mood) of Indian aesthetics, usually translated as humour or comedy. The colour associated with hasya is white and deity, Pramatha, and leads to exultation of the mind.

Hāsya often arises out of Sringara as mentioned in Natya Shastra, the classical treatise on the performing arts of Bharata Muni, theatrologist and musicologist. Rasa means "flavour", and the theory of rasa is the primary concept behind classical Indian arts, including theatre, music, dance, poetry, and even sculpture.
