= Mani Madhaveeyam =

Biographical book

- Author: Das Bhargavinilayam
- Original title: മാണി മാധവീയം
- Language: Malayalam
- Genre: Biography
- Publisher: Department of Cultural Affairs, Government of Kerala
- Publication date: 1991, May
- Publication place: India
- Media type: Print (Hardbound)
- ISBN: 81-86365-78-8

Mani Madhaveeyam (മാണി മാധവീയം in Malayalam) is a biographical book written on the life of Guru Māni Mādhava Chākyār (1989–1991), who was the greatest Kutiyattam-Chakyar Koothu (2000-year-old Sanskrit drama tradition of Kerala, India) exponent and Rasa-abhinaya (classical Indian style of acting according to Natya Shastra) maestro of modern times. The book is published by the Department of Cultural Affairs of Government of Kerala, India in May 1991. The author of the book is Das Bhargavinilayam

== See also ==
- Māni Mādhava Chākyār
- Kutiyattam
- Chakyar Koothu
- Natyakalpadrumam
- Culture of Kerala
- Culture of India
