= Sthayibhava =

Essential aesthetic element of Rasa theory in Sanskrit literature

Sthayibhava (Sanskrit: स्थायिभाव — IAST Sthāyibhāva, transl. Stable emotion, durable psychological state) is one of the essential artistic concepts in Sanskrit dramaturgy. The origin of this concept is attributed to Bharata while formulating his epic on Rasa theory in Natyashastra around 200 BC to 200 AD. Bharata has named eight Sthayibhavas corresponding to each Rasa. According to him all other aesthetic emotions in a drama viz. Vibhavas, Anubhavas, and Vyabhicaribhavas combine together and enhance a Sthayibhava which ultimately transforms into the flavor (Rasa) in a play.

== Overview ==
Rasa is an essential aspect in any good art and the realization of the Rasa is a result of the integration of Stimulus (Vibhava), involuntary reaction (Anubhava), and transitory psychological states or voluntary reactions (Vyabhicaribhava). When mixing of various spices in a delicacy produces different tastes; similarly, when these different bhavas are combined produce Sthayibhava which transforms into Rasa. The concept of Sthayibhavas to produce Rasa was originally applied to drama but later on, it was used in most Sanskrit literature. Though many commentaries were written on Bharata's Natya Shastra earlier, which have been referred by Abhinavagupta where he asserts, Sthayibhava alone when enhanced with other emotions is the basis for Rasa. Thus, Sthayibhava attains mastery over all other forty-nine emotions (Bhavas) as elaborated by him in Natya Shastra.

Bharata in his Natya Shastra mentions eight Sthayibhavas: (i) Rati (Love), (ii) Hasa (Mirth), (iii) Krodha (Anger), (iv) Utsaha (Courage), (v) Bhaya (Fear), (vi) Jugupsa (Aversion), (vii) Vismaya (Wonder), and (viii) Soka (Sorrow) each corresponding to eight Rasas. Poets later to Bharata added tranquility (Sama) or Disenchantment (Nirveda) as a ninth Sthayibhava corresponding to Shantarasa. Bhatta Lollata, in his play upacitivāda comments, Rasa is produced when any one of the eight Sthayibhavas is intensified by the performer by "mimesis" or anukŗti. Just as various spices are mixed in a delicacy produce many tastes, a sensitive person enjoys different tastes and feel pleasure. likewise, a sensitive spectator enjoys various emotions portrayed by the artists in a play. Hence, Abhinavagupta comments, the transformation of Sthayibhava into Rasa is dependent on the audiences' capacity to enjoy the play.

Modern critics of Sanskrit literature argue that Bharata deliberately did not discuss the Sthayibhvas in his work, as he did not intend to merge Rasa, a dominant theme in a drama and an "ordinary" stable emotion (Sthayibhava). To this argument, some experts supporting the origin of Sthayibhava to Bharata comment: when Bharata speaks about the union of Vibhavas, Anubhavas, and Vyabhicaribhavas in Rasa Sutra. It is not only about these emotions coming together, but an alignment of these emotions with a permanent emotion known as Sthayibhava.

== Bibliography ==
- Gupta, Manjul (1987). A Study of Abhinavabhāratī on Bharata's Nāṭyaśāstra and Avaloka on Dhanañjaya's Daśarūpaka: Dramaturgical Principles. Gian Publishing House. ISBN 978-81-212-0086-8.
- S K. De, Sushil Kumar (1960). History of Sanskrit Poetics- - Vol2. Firma K. L. Mukhopadhyay.
- Chakrabarti, Arindam (25 February 2016). The Bloomsbury Research Handbook of Indian Aesthetics and the Philosophy of Art. Bloomsbury Publishing. ISBN 978-1-4725-2430-0.
