= Indian aesthetics =

Indian art evolved with an emphasis on inducing special spiritual or philosophical states in the audience, or by representing them symbolically

== Rasas in the performing arts ==
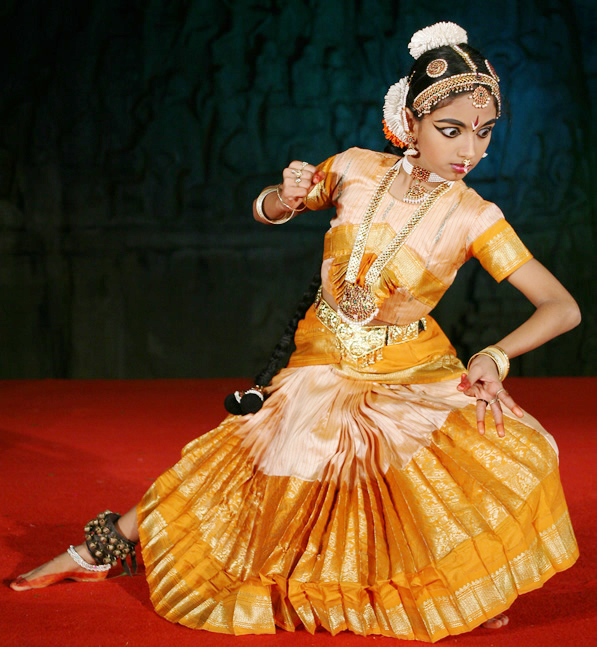
Raudram rasa of the destructive fury of goddess Durga in Bharatanatyam

The theory of rasas still forms the aesthetic underpinning of all Indian classical dance and theatre, such as Bharatanatyam, kathak, Kuchipudi, Odissi, Manipuri, Kudiyattam, Kathakali and others. Expressing rasa in classical Indian dance form is referred to as rasa-abhinaya. The Nātyasāstra carefully delineates the bhavas used to create each rasa.

The expressions used in Kudiyattam or Kathakali are extremely exaggerated theatrical expressions. The opposite of this interpretation is Balasaraswathi's school of subtle and understated abhinaya of the devadasis. There were serious public debates when Balasaraswathi condemned Rukmini Devi's puritanistic interpretations and applications of Sringara rasa. The abhinaya of the Melattur style of abhinaya remains extremely rich in variations of the emotions, while the Pandanallur style expressions are more limited in scope.

== History ==
=== Natyashastra ===
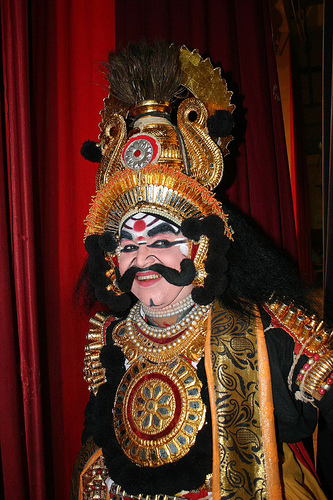
A Yakshagana artist expressing emotions on stage. Vaachikabhinaya is an important part of Yakshagana.

Rasa theory blossoms beginning with the Sanskrit text Nātyashāstra (nātya meaning "drama" and shāstra meaning "science of"), a work attributed to Bharata Muni where the Gods declare that drama is the 'Fifth Veda' because it is suitable for the degenerate age as the best form of religious instruction. The Nātyashāstra presents the aesthetic concepts of rasas and their associated bhāvas in chapters six and seven, respectively, which appear to be independent of the work as a whole. Eight rasas and associated bhāvas are named, and their enjoyment is likened to savoring a meal: rasa is the enjoyment of flavors that arise from the proper preparation of ingredients and the quality of ingredients.

=== Kashmiri aestheticians ===
The theory of the rasas develops significantly with the Kashmiri aesthetician Ãnandavardhana's classic on poetics, the Dhvanyāloka which introduces the ninth rasa, shānta-rasa as a specifically religious feeling of peace (śānta) which arises from its bhāva, weariness of the pleasures of the world. The primary purpose of this text is to refine the literary concept dhvani or poetic suggestion, by arguing for the existence of rasa-dhvani, primarily in forms of Sanskrit including a word, sentence or whole work "suggests" a real-world emotional state or bhāva, but thanks to aesthetic distance, the sensitive spectator relishes the rasa, the aesthetic flavor of tragedy, heroism or romance.

The 9th - 10th century master of the religious system known as "the nondual Shaivism of Kashmir" (or Kashmir Shaivism) and aesthetician, Abhinavagupta brought rasa theory to its pinnacle in his separate commentaries on the Dhvanyāloka, the Dhvanyāloka-locana (translated by Ingalls, Masson and Patwardhan, 1992) and the Abhinavabharati, his commentary on the Nātyashāstra, portions of which are translated by Gnoli and Masson and Patwardhan. Abhinavagupta offers for the first time a technical definition of rasa, which is the universal bliss of the Self or Atman colored by the emotional tone of a drama.

=== Inclusion of bhakti ===
In the literary compositions, the emotion of bhakti as a feeling of adoration towards God was long considered only a minor feeling fit only for stotras, but not capable of being developed into a separate rasa as the sole theme of a whole poem or drama. In the tenth century, it was still struggling, and Abhinavagupta mentions bhakti in his commentary on the Natya Shastra, as an important accessory sentiment of the shanta rasa, which he strove with great effort to establish. However, just as Shanta slowly attained a state of primacy that it was considered the rasa of rasas, bhakti also soon began to loom large and, despite the lukewarmness of the great run of alankarikas, had the service of some distinguished advocates, including Tyagaraja. It is the Bhagavata that gave the great impetus to the study of bhakti from an increasingly aesthetic point of view.

=== Attention to rasas ===
Poets like Kālidāsa were attentive to rasa, which blossomed into a fully developed aesthetic system. Even in contemporary India, the term rasa denoting "flavor" or "essence," is used colloquially to describe the aesthetic experiences in films.

== The Navarasas ==
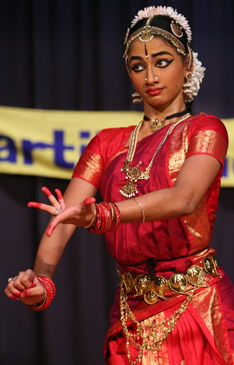
Expression of Sringāra (Romance) in Bharatanatyam

Bharata Muni enunciated the eight rasas in the Nātyasāstra, an ancient Sanskrit text of dramatic theory and other performance arts, written between 200 BC and 200 AD. In the Indian performing arts, a rasa is a sentiment or emotion evoked in each member of the audience by the art. The Natya Shastra mentions six rasa in one section, but in the dedicated section on rasa it states and discusses eight primary rasa. Each rasa, according to Nātyasāstra, has a presiding deity and a specific colour. There are 4 pairs of rasas. For instance, Hāsya arises out of Sringara. The Aura of a frightened person is black, and the aura of an angry person is red. Bharata Muni established the following:

- Śṛṅgāraḥ (शृङ्गारः): Romance, Love, attractiveness. Presiding deity: Vishnu. Colour: light green
- Hāsyaṃ (हास्यं): Laughter, mirth, comedy. Presiding deity: Shiva. Colour: white
- Raudraṃ (रौद्रं): Fury. Presiding deity: Shiva. Colour: red
- Kāruṇyaṃ (कारुण्यं): Compassion, mercy. Presiding deity: Yama. Colour: grey
- Bībhatsam (बीभत्सं): Disgust, aversion. Presiding deity: Shiva. Colour: blue
- Bhayānakaṃ (भयानकं): Horror, terror. Presiding deity: Yama. Colour: black
- Vīraṃ (वीरं): Heroism. Presiding deity: Indra. Colour: saffron
- Adbhutaṃ (अद्भुतं): Wonder, amazement. Presiding deity: Brahma. Colour: yellow

=== Śāntaṃ rasa ===
A ninth rasa was added by later authors. This addition had to undergo a good deal of struggle between the sixth and the tenth centuries, before it could be accepted by the majority of the Alankarikas, and the expression "Navarasa" (the nine rasas), could come into vogue.

- Śāntaṃ: Peace or tranquility. deity: Vishnu. Colour: perpetual white.

Shānta-rasa functions as an equal member of the set of rasas, but it is simultaneously distinct as being the most clear form of aesthetic bliss. Abhinavagupta likens it to the string of a jeweled necklace; while it may not be the most appealing for most people, it is the string that gives form to the necklace, allowing the jewels of the other eight rasas to be relished. Relishing the rasas and particularly shānta-rasa is hinted as being as good as but never equal to the bliss of Self-realization experienced by yogis.

== See also ==
- Abhinaya
- Bishōnen – A Japanese beauty concept with influence from Indian aesthetic concepts
- Nātyasāstra – An ancient Sanskrit text on performance arts and aesthetics
- Nātyakalpadrumam
- Rasa lila
- Sanskrit Literature
- Sanskrit Theatre
