= Mani Madhava Chakyar: The Master at Work =

1994 Indian film by Kavalam Narayana Panicker

- Biographical film on life and work of Guru Mani Madhava Chakkiar
- Directed by: Kavalam Narayana Panicker
- Written by: Kavalam Narayana Panicker
- Starring: Guru Mani Madhava Chakkiar
- Distributed by: Sangeet Natak Akademi; New Delhi
- Release date: 1994
- Running time: 30 minutes
- Country: India
- Language: English

Mani Madhava Chakyar: The Master at Work is a 1994 biographical film on the life and work of Māni Mādhava Chākyār, maestro of Kutiyattam. The film is directed by Kavalam Narayana Panicker and produced by Sangeet Natak Akademi, New Delhi.

== See also ==
- Māni Mādhava Chākyār
- Manifestations of Shiva (film)
- Kutiyattam
