= Mahnaz Fancy =

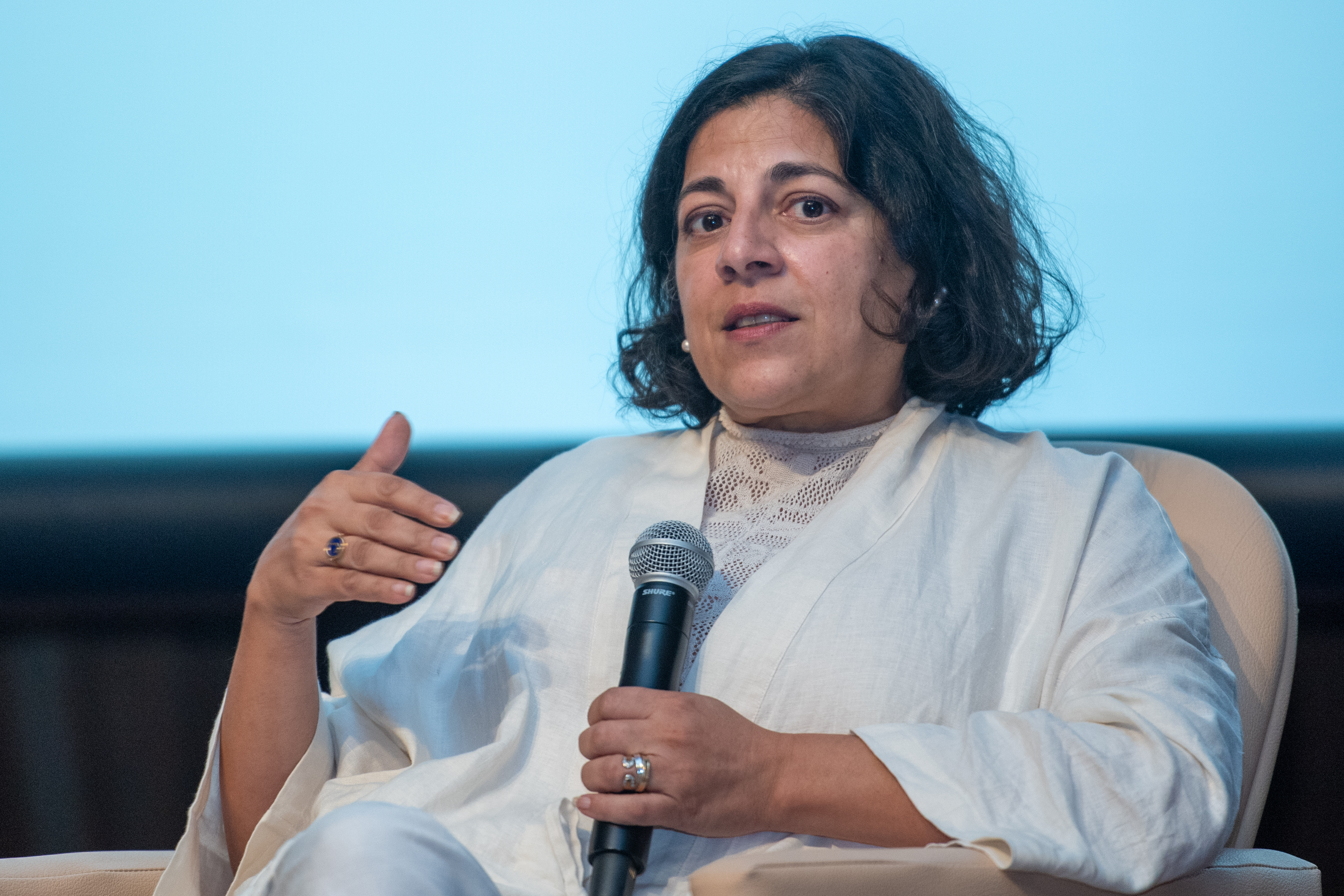
- Education: Chicago University
- Occupation: Principal art researcher at the UAE Ministry of Culture
- Years active: 15 years

Mahnaz Fancy is a cultural studies scholar and arts advisor.

She has over 20 years of leadership roles in building US and UAE-based institutions engaged in the development of the MENASA cultural ecosystem. and leading non-profit institutions for the strategic development of contemporary cultural infrastructure in the MENASA region.

She is currently principal art researcher at the UAE Ministry of Culture since 2023.

== Study and career ==
Fancy did her graduate work in comparative literature at the University of Chicago where she concentrated on the influence of Islamic and Indian aesthetics on modern European arts. After pursuing a PhD in comparative literature with a concentration on postcolonial studies at the University of Chicago, she led several New York-based non-profit arts organizations.

In addition to her roles as development director for the Alliance of Civilizations Media Fund and executive director of the Arts of the Islamic World Virtual Museum, Fancy oversaw the IndoCenter of Art & Culture in 2001 and 2002. In this capacity, she oversaw institutional fund-raising, strategic development, marketing, and public relations in addition to creating and executing exhibitions, public programmes, and educational initiatives.

She was the executive director of ArteEast, a leading New York-based international arts organization dedicated to supporting and promoting contemporary artistic production from the Middle East and North Africa as well as their diaspora. from 2011 to 2015, where she worked with local, regional, and international stakeholders from philanthropic, academic, and creative sectors.

Throughout her career, she has had many roles in organisations that support classical Islamic art and rising modern art from South Asia and the Middle East. Among these roles has been acting executive director of the American Pakistan Foundation.

== Activities ==
Fancy has provided consultation services to numerous organisations that are creating cultural programmes and displays related to Islamic, Middle Eastern, and South Asian arts. In addition, she has advised on a number of significant South Asian art exhibitions, organised contemporary Pakistani art exhibitions in New York, and writes and lectures as a freelance cultural critic and South Asian art specialist.

She has launched several not-for-profit cultural initiatives, and she has produced and curated public programs, festivals, and exhibitions on film, music and the visual arts, and also spoken and written extensively. Mahnaz has organized exhibitions, festivals, conferences, professional workshops, publications, and public education programs and she continues to advise, write and speak extensively on the arts and their social impact.
