= Nātyakalpadrumam =

Book on Kerala's Sanskrit drama theatre

- Author: Māni Mādhava Chākyār
- Original title: നാട്യകല്‍‌പദ്രുമം
- Language: Malayalam
- Genre: Theatrical Study
- Publisher: Kerala Kalamandalam, Vallathol Nagar (with financial assistance of Sangeet Natak Academi, New Delhi); National Book Stall, Kottayam- (distributors)
- Publication date: 1975, January
- Publication place: India
- Media type: Print (Hardbound)
- Pages: 240pps

Nātyakalpadrumam (നാട്യകല്‍‌പദ്രുമം in Malayalam, नाट्यकल्पद्रुमम् in Devanagari) is a book written by Guru Māni Mādhava Chākyār, considered the greatest exponent of Koodiyattam and Abhinaya in Kerala, about all aspects of ancient Sanskrit drama theatre tradition of Kerala—Kutiyattam. It was first published in Malayalam (1975) by Kerala Kalamandalam, with financial assistance of Sangeet Natak Academi, New Delhi. This work serves as a reference to both scholars and students. The entire book is written in the old Sanskrit text style closely following Nātyaśāstra. The structure and content of the book alike illustrate the knowledge of the author in both Sanskrit and Nātyaśāstra. The work received the Kerala Sahitya Academy Award in the year 1976. A Hindi translation has been published by the Sangeet Natak Akademi, New Delhi.

== Contents ==
Natyakalpadruma- theatrical study written by Mani Madhava Chakiar the great Guru of Koodiyattam the traditional Sanskrit theatre, is divided into eight chapters. The cover photo shows the famous Pakarnnaatta-Abhinaya (male character enacting female character) of the maestro in Koodiyattam. Preface of the book is written by renowned scholar Shri Kunjunni Raja. The book contains Navarasa photos of the maestro along with many of his rare Koodiyattam photos.

=== Introduction ===
The author begins his work with an introduction and a few benedictory and introductory versus written in Sanskrit language. Here he salutes Gods, Goddesses and his great Gurus like Panditaratnam Pannisseri Sankaran Nampoothiripad and His Highness Darsanakalanidhi Rama Varma Parikshith Thampuran. Then he summarises the beginning of Nātya and Nātyaveda as told by the great sage Bharata in his monumental work Nātyaśāstra and salutes the sage. Then in one stanza the author narrates his horoscope (Jataka) which depicts his scholarship in Jyotisha. Then again he prays for the blessings of sage Bharatha the propagator of Nātya on the earth.

In the last stanza he compares his work to the Kalpadruma- the heavenly tree which gives everything requested. Nātyakalpadruma also gives all details about Nātya that is Koodiyattam and so the name of the work Nātyakalpadruma is meaningful in all senses.

=== Chapters ===
The eight chapters included in this work are

- Samjnāprakarana
- Paribhāshāprakarana
- Mudra-Taalaprakarana
- Swaraprakarana
- Rasaprakarana
- Abhyasaprakarana
- Drishtāntaprakarana
- Vaisheshikaprakarana.

The first chapter Samjnaprakarana gives the names of costumes and other materials used in Koodiyattam. A detailed description of different names etc. used in Koodiyattam for different steps, actions etc. are also given in this chapter.

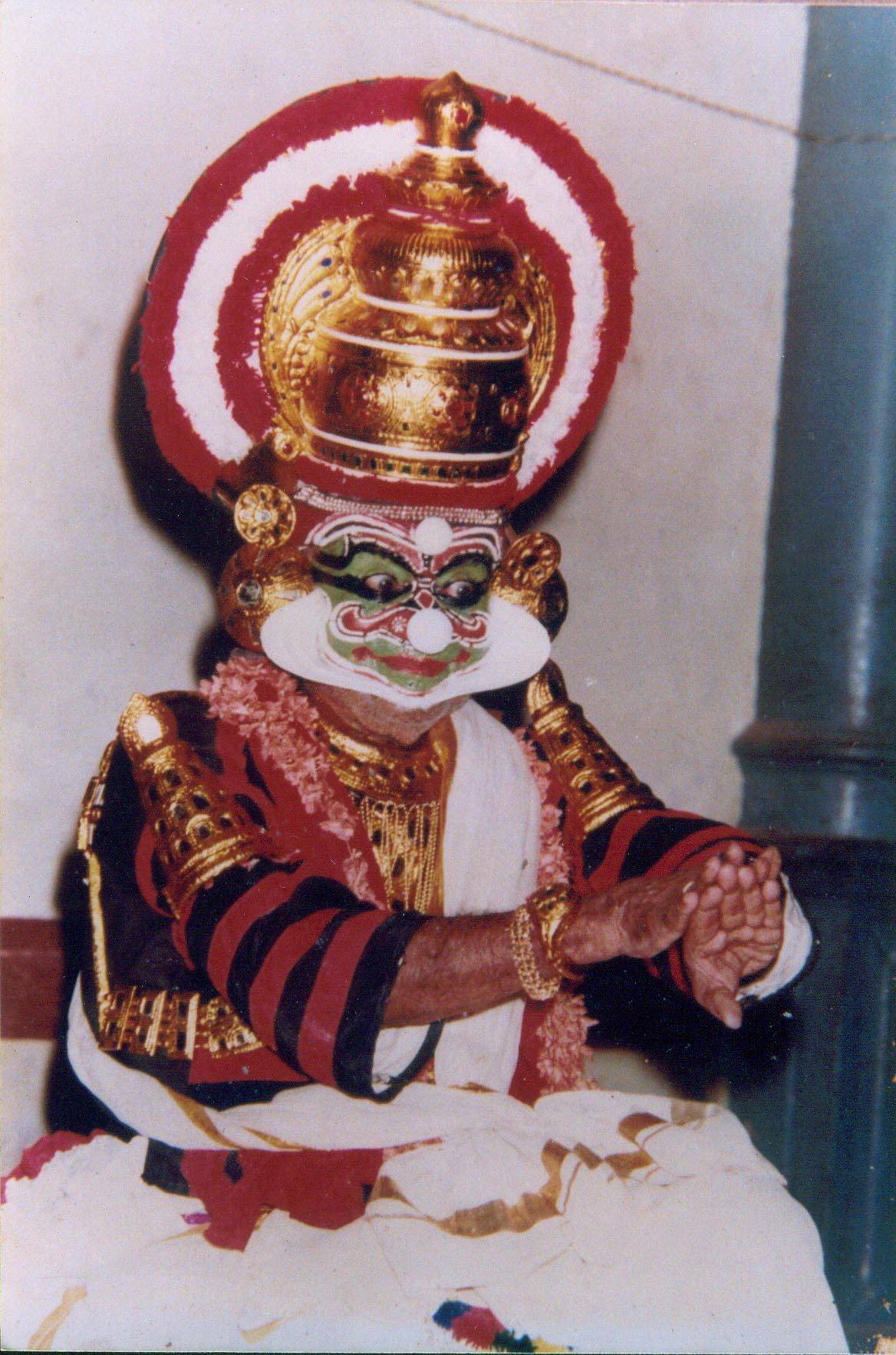
Satwikābhinaya- Guru Maani Madhava Chakkiyar as Ravana (kathi vesham) in Kutiyattam

The second chapter Paribhashapakarana gives the names and descriptions of different types of narration, enacting, characters, their languages, characteristic features etc. This chapter also narrates different types of acting which are included in koodiyattam on special occasions. For example, how to act on stage without dialogue such things like capital city, mountain, trees, garden, hermitage, seasons, heaven etc. are given precisely. Famous Abhinayas (acting) such as Kailasoddhārana (lifting of Kailasa), Pārvatī Viraha (separation of Pārvatī) etc. are also included in this chapter. Details of wearing different costumes and different types of abhinaya are also given here.

The third chapter Mudra-Taalaprakarana gives elaborate narration of Mudras (movements of hands and fingers), their names and their usage in Abhinaya. Different Taalas used in Koodiyattam are also described here. The usage of different Taalas according to different Swaras (Rāgas) and different contexts is the next point discussed in this chapter.

The fourth chapter, Swaraprakarana deals with different Swaras (Ragas) used in Koodiyattam they are 20 in number which are called Muddan, Shreekantthi, Thondu, Aarthan, Indalam, Muralindalam, Veladhuli, Danam, Veeratarkan, Tarkan, Korakkurunji, Paurali, Poraneeru, Dukkhagandharam, Chetipanchamam, Bhinnapanchamam, Shreekamaram, Kaishiki, Ghattanthari and Anthari. Details of their usage in abhinaya according to Rasas, Characters, Contexts etc. are also narrated with suitable examples.

The fifth chapter which is called Rasaprakarana deals with Satwika-Abhinaya (Satwikābhinaya)- the most important one among the four types of Abhinayas. Topics such as Nātya, Nritya, Nritta, Rasa, Bhava, Vibhava, Anubhāva, Satwikabhāva, Vyabhicharibhāva, their enacting, movements of eyes for different Rasas and Bhavas etc. are also discussed here . Some examples of Rasābhinaya (Rasa-Abhinaya) are also given. Thus this chapter gives a clear picture of the theory and practice regarding Rasābhinaya. The minute details of Netrābhinaya- enacting with eyes, eyes only are given here by the greatest master of Netrābhinaya.

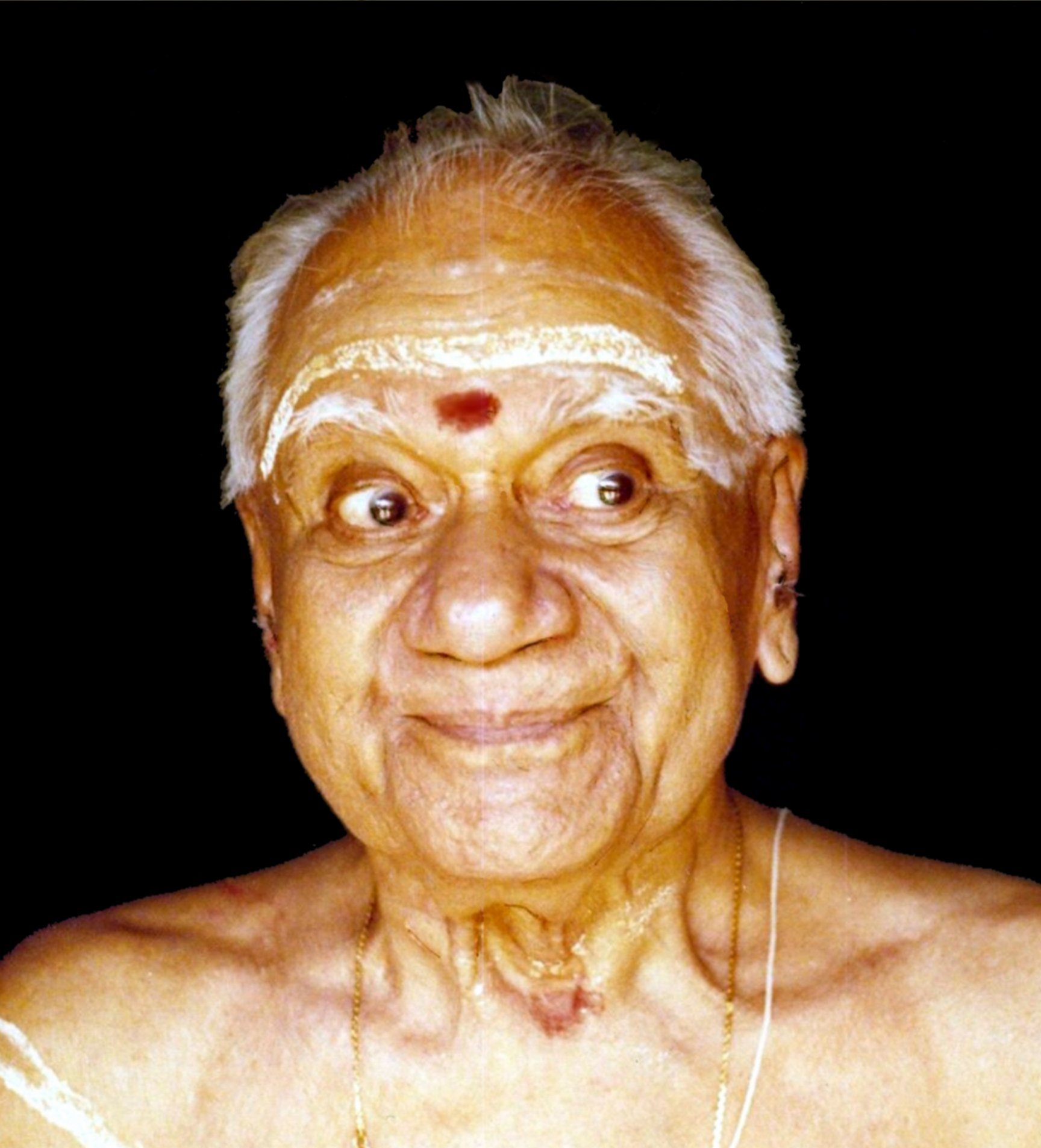
Sringāra Rasa by Guru Māni Mādhava Chākyār

The sixth chapter Abhyāsaprakarana deals with practical training in Koodiyattam. Here the author gives twenty one types of eye movement which are to be practiced by a Koodiyattam artist who specialises in Rasābhinaya. These are very important for Koodiyattam artist as well as artists from other classical art forms. Special duties of Chakiars (actors), Nangiarammas (actresses) and Nambiars (drummers who play Mizhavu) are also narrated here in detail .

Drishtāntaprakarana the seventh chapter contains examples of different types of abhinaya, narrations of different types of stories and conversations etc. used in Koodiyattams. Peculiarities of languages to be used in different contexts by different characters are also given here.

The last chapter Vaisheshikaprakarana gives Slokas used as benedictory verses in the beginning of different Koodiyattams with and without Abhinaya, Slokas used in Nirvahana, Slokas used at the time of elaborate special Abhinayas such as the beauty of heroine etc., Slokas used by Vidūshaka (Vidushaka) which are mostly in regional language Malayalam or Prakrit, examples of stories used by Vidushaka etc. It also gives the details of special stage arrangements to be made for the performance of some rare scenes. Then the author gives the special rules and regulations to be observed by the Koodiyattam troop at the time of performance especially when it is done in a Koothampalam (traditional theatre) or in a traditional Hindu temple which are the real stages of this traditional, classical art form. Some special rights of traditional families of artists are also given. Details of special performance in some traditional Hindu temples in Kerala are also discussed in this chapter.

Thus the work contains all details regarding the traditional classical temple art. The footsteps of the great scholar, artist and Achārya, who lived on the stage for about 80 years, is seen in this commendable work. His notable skill in Koodiyattam includes the unparalleled Netrābhinaya.

== Translation ==
This monumental work has been published in Hindi by Sangeet Natak Akademi, New Delhi (1996). The translation was done by Chakyar Koothu- Koodiyattam artist and son of Guru Māni Mādhava Chākyār, PK Govindan Nambiar- and edited by Dr. Prem Lata Sharma.

== See also ==
- Māni Mādhava Chākyār
- Natyashastra
- Abhinaya
- Navarasa
- Chakyar Koothu
- Koodiyattam
- Sanskrit Theatre
- Mani Damodara Chakyar
- Kathakali
- Mohiniyattam
- Thulall
