= Shanta Rasa =

One of the nine aesthetic flavors in Sanskrit literature

Śāntarasa (Sanskrit: शान्तरस, occasionally spelled shantarasa, santarasa; transl. the imaginative experience of tranquility, emotion of emotionlessness) is considered a ninth rasa, a concept of aesthetic flavour in Sanskrit literature. According to one translation of Abhinavabhārati, Abhinavagupta's commentary on Nāṭyaśāstra, śāntarasa may be defined as: "that which brings happiness and welfare to all beings and which is accompanied by the stabilisation (saṃsthitā) in the Self." It has as its stable emotion (sthāyibhāva) impassivity (sama) which culminates in detachment (Vairāgya) arising from knowledge of truth and purity of mind. J. L. Masson and M. V. Patwardhan, who have collected the original manuscripts and translated Abhinavagupta's work, observe: the audience undergoes transcendental experience, which is basic to all aesthetic experience in a play based on śāntarasa. It was not included in the list of rasas mentioned by Bharata in his epic Nāṭyaśāstra. The inclusion of this rasa as a prominent one in Sanskrit poetry and dramaturgy is attributed to Udbhata, a president in the court of king Jayapida of Kashmir during 779-813 CE and a contemporary of Vamana. Much of the literary criticism on this flavor was further carried out by Ānandavardhana in his commentary on Mahābhārata and Rāmāyaṇa and later by Abhinavagupta in Nāṭyaśāstra.

== Etymology ==
The term rasa, first appears in the epic text of Bharata, the antiquity of Nāṭyaśāstra which varies from 500 BC to 500 AD. Bharata's Nāṭyaśāstra discusses only about eight rasas. Post Bharata, many poets spoke only of the same eight rasas. Though some experts hint at many earlier poets before Bharata who accepted śāntarasa as a ninth rasa. V Raghavan a Sanskrit scholar, attributes the recognition of śāntarasa as a ninth rasa to Udbhata, a poet from Kashmir during late eighth-century AD, who elaborately discussed nine rasas in his commentary on the Nāṭyaśāstra. He also speculates the authorship of the ninth rasa as the main theme in dramatics and poetry to some Buddhist or Jain poets and dramatists for making this a leading rasa.

== Overview ==
No sorrow is there in it, no happiness, no disquiet, no anger or passion, and never any longing— thus is the peaceful Rasa described by the greatest of sages, which has the same warrant as all the other emotions.

— Anonymous,

Ānandavardhana defines śāntarasa as a flavor by portraying the attainment of happiness through disconnection with all the worldly desires. Whereas, a later Sanskrit connoisseur Abhinavagupta links it to the means of achieving mokṣa achieved resulting from the knowledge of the truth (tattvajñāna). Abhinavagupta, in accordance with the poets earlier to him, considers aesthetic pleasure to be a primary aspect in drama and poetry. He considers śāntarasa as inherent flavor to attain spiritual liberation through tranquility. According to him, all the aesthetic flavors in drama are aimed at the ultimate goal of achieving tranquility and thus, the aim of all the rasas is śāntarasa. Hence, he places the ninth rasa as a supreme among others as it is a means to attain mokṣa. Similarly, some commentators argue that the emotion of detachment from all the associated sentiments and passions from the worldly desires as a stable emotion (nirveda) of this rasa, which ultimately leads to peace and tranquility.

== Commentaries ==
In Ānandavardhana's Light on implicature (Dhvanyāloka), where rasa is a central phenomenon, he argues that the dominant rasa in Mahābhārata and Rāmāyaṇa is śāntarasa and not vīrarasa and karuṇārasa respectively. He classifies the Mahābhārata in three categories namely: a prescriptive work Śāstra, a story akhyana, and poetry kāvya and As his interpretation of stable emotion of this rasa is pleasure derived from the cessation of all desires (tṛṣṇākṣayasukha) He draws attention to one among many of the climaxes of the epic Mahābhārata, where all the Vṛṣṇis and Pānḍavas meet their respective miserable ends. He similarly constructs the story of Rāmāyaṇa where Rāma is separated from Sītā, which, according to Ānandavardhana, climaxes in both the kāvyas portrays śāntarasa as the dominant flavor of disenchantment with the world, ultimately leading to liberation from worldly pleasures (mokṣa), whereas other rasas are placed in a subordinate position. Gary Tubb, in his scholarly work, argues the stable emotion of "the pleasure derived from the cessation of desire" should not be viewed as an emotion experienced by the characters, but as the emotional state intended to be evoked in the readers themselves.

Kalhaṇa's Rājataraṃgiṇī authored in the mid-twelfth-century AD is another literary work on śāntarasa, though there is debate among scholars on whether Rājataraṃgiṇī should be considered as a historical work or literature. Based on the length and contents of the work, the author himself considers it to be art-literature (kāvya). In an opening verse in his kāvya, he declares śāntarasa as a dominant aesthetic objective of his work. Kalhaṇa borrows the stable emotion for his kāvya from Anandavarma's commentary on Mahabharata: pleasure derived from the cessation of desires. Though most of the central characters in his work show no sign of such an emotion, but here Kalhaṇa implies that the emotion needs to be evoked in the readers rather than experienced by the characters as suggested by Gary Tubb. As Kalhaṇa is intending to write an authentic historical account of the Kashmiri kings, he cannot recast the emotional mood of his work. Hence, despite a strong tendency to avoid unpleasant emotional flavors, as supported by then prevailing literary theory and poetic practice. Kalhaṇa being consistent in providing a factual account of the Kashmiri kings, he invokes the distasteful flavor (vīrarasa) as a subordinate to śāntarasa as the aesthetic goal of his work.

== Reception ==
The critics of śāntarasa have objected to considering it a ninth rasa. Some give the reason that Bharata, who is attributed to defining only eight rasas, did not speak of śāntarasa. But, one of the main objections comes as the way of defining its sthāyibhāva as detachment (sama). Many commentators argue that portraying such a state of cessation or detachment from all the worldly desires is not possible on the stage, hence it could not be an aesthetic flavor in poetics and dramaturgy. Proponents of śāntarasa counterargue that śṛṅgāra rasa is not denied the stature of a rasa merely because it does not portray actual sexual intercourse (samproyoga) on the stage, just as is the case for raudra (रौद्र, transl. the rasa of fury or anger, derived via the morphological process of वृद्धि (vṛddhi) from रुद्र (rudra), the name of a Vedic deity, later identified with Shiva (śiva, Sanskrit: शिव), and murder. Thus, the supporters of śāntarasa as a rasa assert, the aim in a drama is not to present an impossible flavor on this stage, but to portray "ardent spirit in search of truth and tranquility". According to Sheldon Pollock, a new category in aesthetic flavors was created even though most of the religious poetry was based on the passion and desire of God and not about dispassion. Further, he quotes Mammaṭa, where he observes: "When the desire is directed toward a deity, we have 'emotion' rather than rasa."

== Bibliography ==
- Raghavan, V (1975), The Number of Rasa-s, Adyar Library
- Masson, J L; Patwardhan, M V (1969), SantaRasa and Abhinavagupta's Philosophy of Aesthetics, Bhandarkar Oriental research Institute, OCLC 844547798
- Pollock, Sheldon (26 April 2016), A Rasa Reader: Classical Indian Aesthetics, Columbia University Press, ISBN 978-0-231-54069-8
