= Vidyapati Smriti Parv =

Maithil cultural occasion dedicated to Vidyapati

Vidyapati Smriti Parv (Maithili: विद्यापति स्मृति पर्व) is a cultural occasion held in memory of the Maithil poet Vidyapati from the Mithila region in the Indian subcontinent. The Maithil poet Vidyapati was a prominent scholar of the Maithili and Sanskrit literatures. He is considered as one of the main pillars in the shringar and devotional traditions of Indian literature. On the occasion of the Vidyapati Smriti Parv, participants pay homage and tribute to Vidyapati by offering flowers on a picture or idol of the poet. Similarly local artists present singing and instrumental performances. Some artists stage drama play in the memory of Vidyapati. The dignitaries invited in occasion give memorial lectures attributed to the poet Vidyapati and his contributions to the Maithili and Sanskrit literatures in the subcontinent. The enchanting splendor of the rich culture of Mithila can be seen in the cultural events of the Vidyapati Smriti Parv On this occasion, artists give live presentation of the folk culture of Mithila.
