= Manifestations of Shiva =

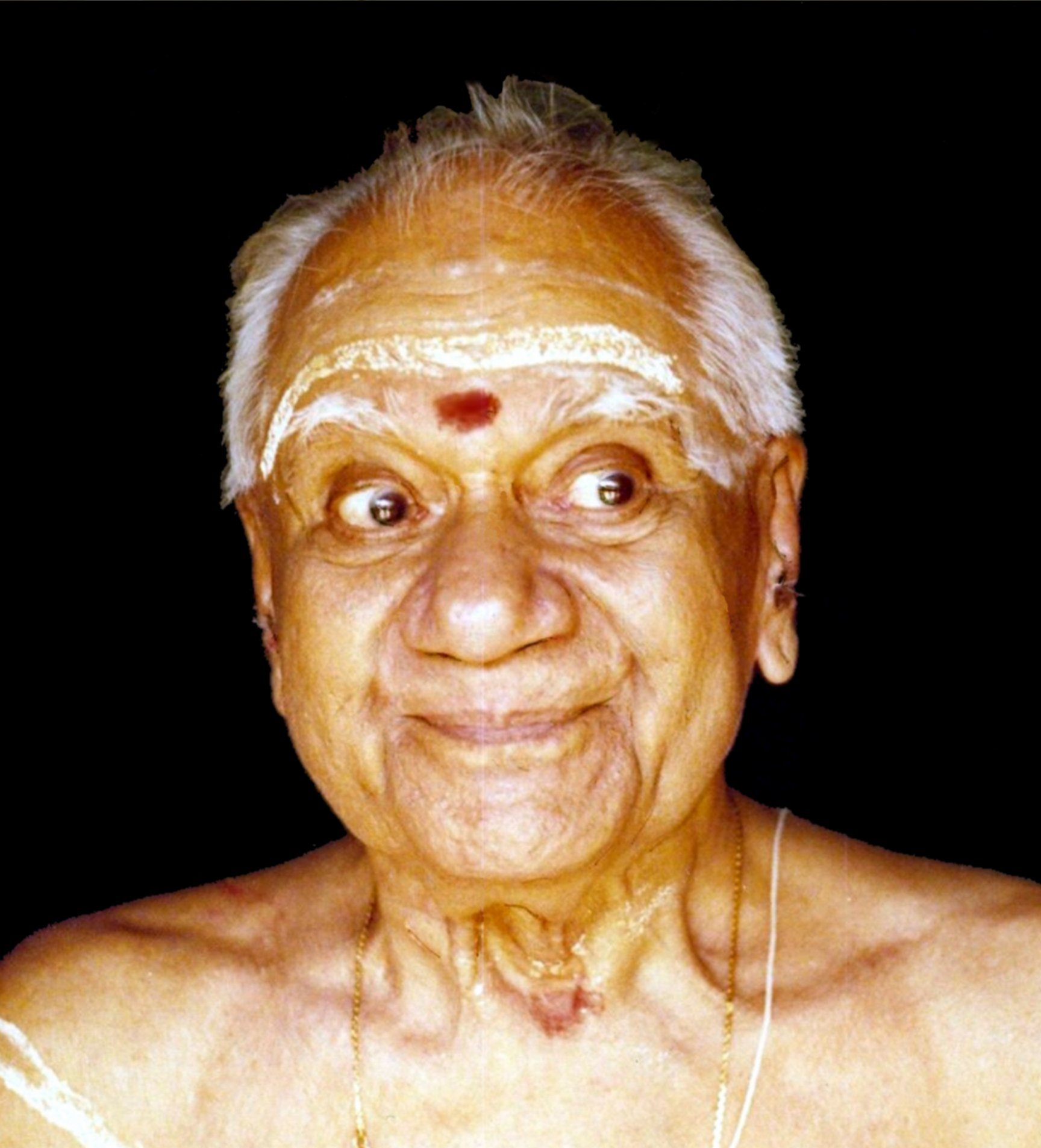
- Guru Mani Madhava Chakkiar
- Directed by: Malcolm Leigh
- Written by: Malcolm Leigh
- Produced by: Muriel Peters; Smithsonian Institution; Atlantic Richfield Foundation
- Starring: Guru Mani Madhava Chakkiar
- Cinematography: Malcolm Leigh
- Edited by: Robert T Megginson
- Distributed by: Philadelphia Museum of Art, The Asia Society
- Release date: 1980
- Running time: 90 minutes
- Country: United States
- Language: English

Manifestations of Shiva is a 1980 documentary film (90-minute) about the Hindu god Shiva's worship. It carries the performance aspects of Shiva-worship through dance, performing art, visual art and music. The film is directed by Malcolm Leigh and main casting is done by the legendary Kutiyattam (2000-year-old Sanskrit Indian theatre tradition) artist and authority of Abhinaya (the classical Indian acting style) and Natya Shastra scholar - Nātyāchārya Guru Māni Mādhava Chākyār.

== See also ==
- Shiva
- Māni Mādhava Chākyār
- Kutiyattam
