= Abhinaya =

Art of expression in Indian aesthetics

Abhinaya (Sanskrit abhi- 'towards' + nii- 'leading/guide') is the art of expression in Indian aesthetics. More accurately it means "leading an audience towards" the experience (bhava) of a sentiment (rasa). The concept, derived from Bharata Muni's Natya Shastra, is used as an integral part of all Indian classical dance styles.

Abhinaya has four interrelated aspects: angika (the body), vacika (the voice), aharya (costumes, make-up, scenery), and sattvika (mental states).

== Expression of the limbs (Āṅgika Abhinaya) ==
Angika Abhinaya denotes the movements of angas like head, hands, waist and face. Pratyangas like shoulders, arms, thighs, knees and elbows and upangas like eyes, eyelid, cheeks, nose, lips and teeth. Additional hastas (hand gestures) have always played a significant role in conveyance of the emotion and through of a soul. Many of the natural gestures are found common to mankind and their meaning easily understood.

Mastery of abhinaya includes the ability to direct the audience's gaze toward a particular sight, through eye movements. The performer's focused gaze cues the audience for where to look.

== Expression of speech (Vāchika Abhinaya) ==
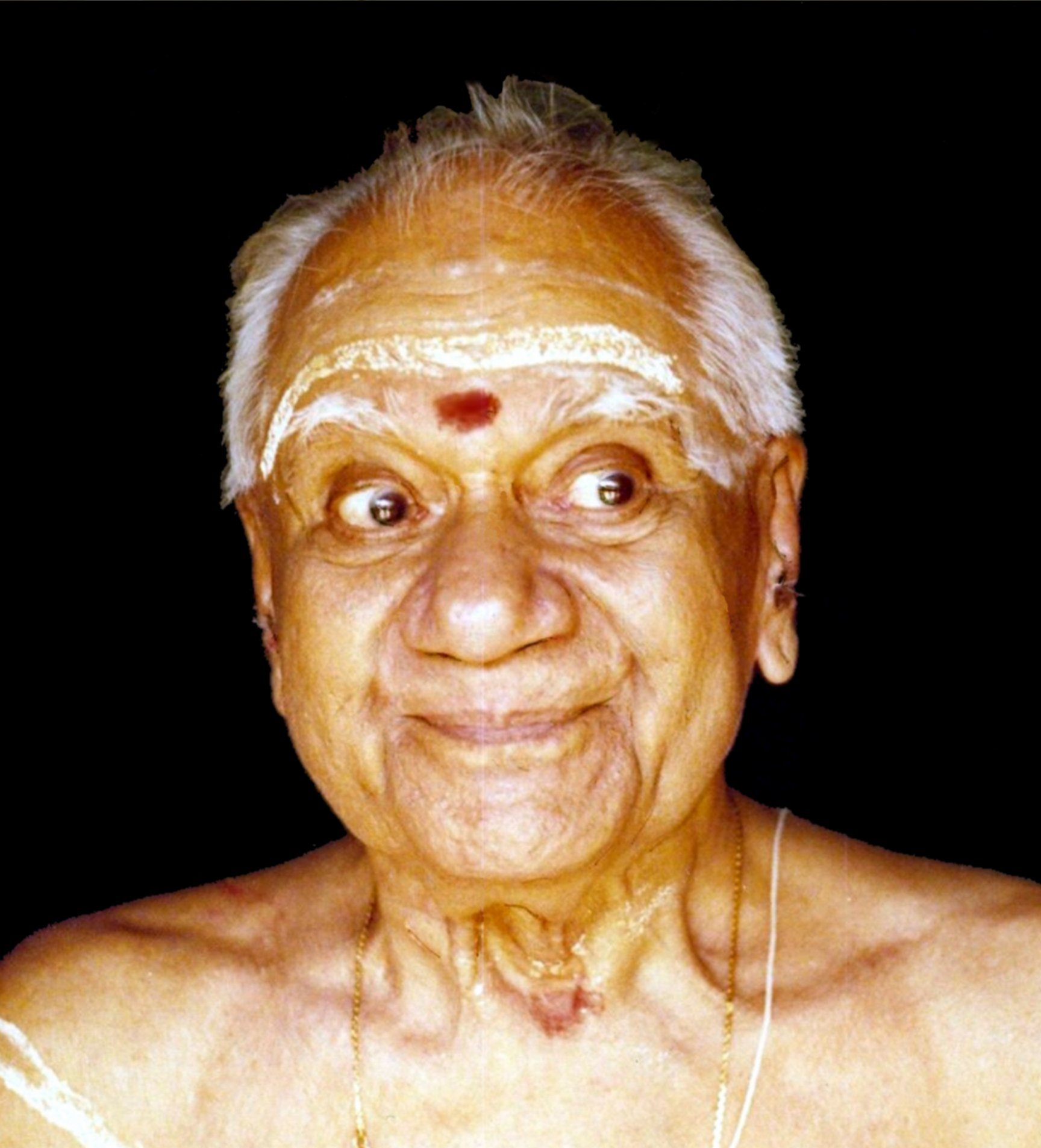
Nātyācārya Māni Mādhava Chākyār performing Sringāra Rasa

Speech is used in drama and also in music when the singer expresses the emotion through his or her singing. In the Kuchipudi and Melattur styles of Indian classical dance the dancers often mouth the words of the songs (padartha abhinaya). Kerala still has stage art forms that have Vāchika Abhinaya as a dominant component - Koodiyattam, Nangyar Kooothu, Ottan, Seetangan & Parayan - the three types of Thullal, Mudiyettu are the most popular.

== Costume and scene (Āhārya Abhinaya) ==
Another means of representation of the play is the costumes and physical decorations of the actors and the theatre. In dramas and dance dramas, costume and making are distinguished by the sex, race, sect or class, or the social position of the characters, giving the production of the presentation some semblance of reality. The decorations of the stage theatre including lights and accessories are related to the scene of the depiction in which enhances the rasa between the audience and artists also comes under this category.

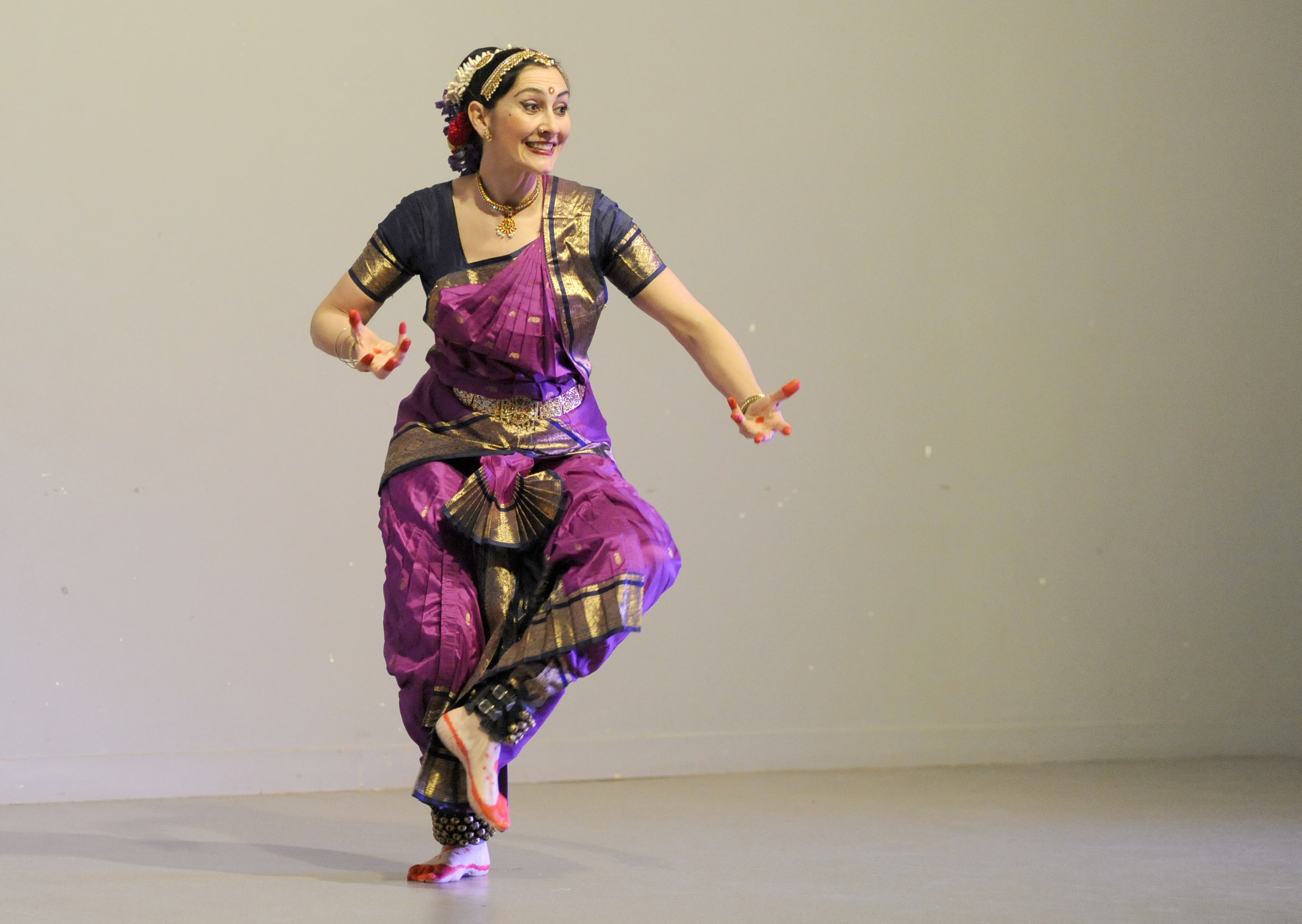
G. Nalini as Krsna is stealing fruits

In Kathakali, there are seven basic makeup types that signify different character tropes. For example, divine figures and epic heroes have green makeup with a white outline, and elaborate ornaments. The demons have Kati vesham in which the nose is painted red. But in solo dance performances aharya abhinaya is a convention to it.

== True expression (Sāttvika Abhinaya) ==
Sāttvika Abhinaya is the mental message, emotion or image communicated with the audience through the performer's own inner emotions. The dancer or actor has to use experience, something authentic, to capture the audience and to elicit an empathetic response. The human activity in other words, is traditionally classified as belonging to the mind, voice and body. Bharatha Muni in Natyashastra mentioned that sathva is something originated in mind.

== Lokadharmi and Natyadharmi Abhinaya ==
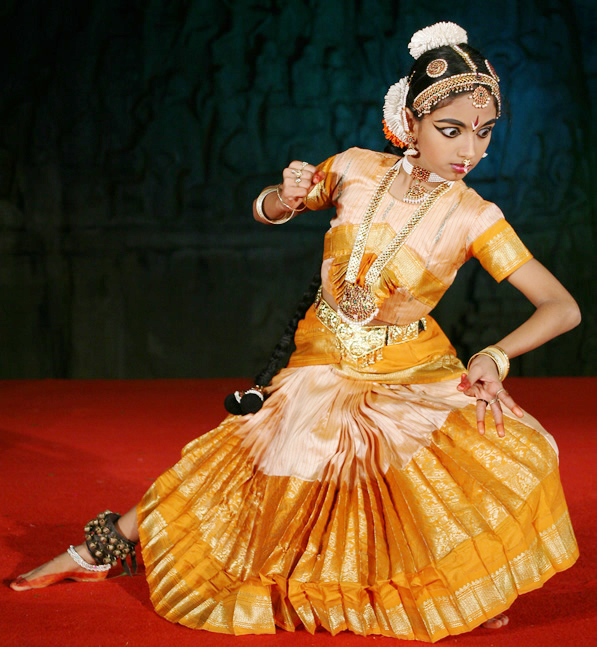
Dancer performing abhinaya

A principal division is that between natyadharmi abhinaya and lokadharmi abhinaya. The former is poetic and stylistic in nature, following a codified manner of presenting emotion and expression which pertains to the conventions of the stage, which appear to have greater 'artistry' by virtue of taking something from natural life and rendering it in a suitably stylised way. Lokadharmi abhinaya is the opposite: realistic and un-stylised, involving very natural expression and movement, as occurs in daily life. Often this is the more difficult as the possibilities for interpretation of an emotion or a line of poetry are endless.

== See also ==
- Classical Indian dance
- Natyashastra
- Navarasa
- Nātyakalpadrumam
- Rasa (aesthetics)
- Sanskrit drama
