= Kavalam Narayana Panicker =

Indian dramatist (1928–2016)

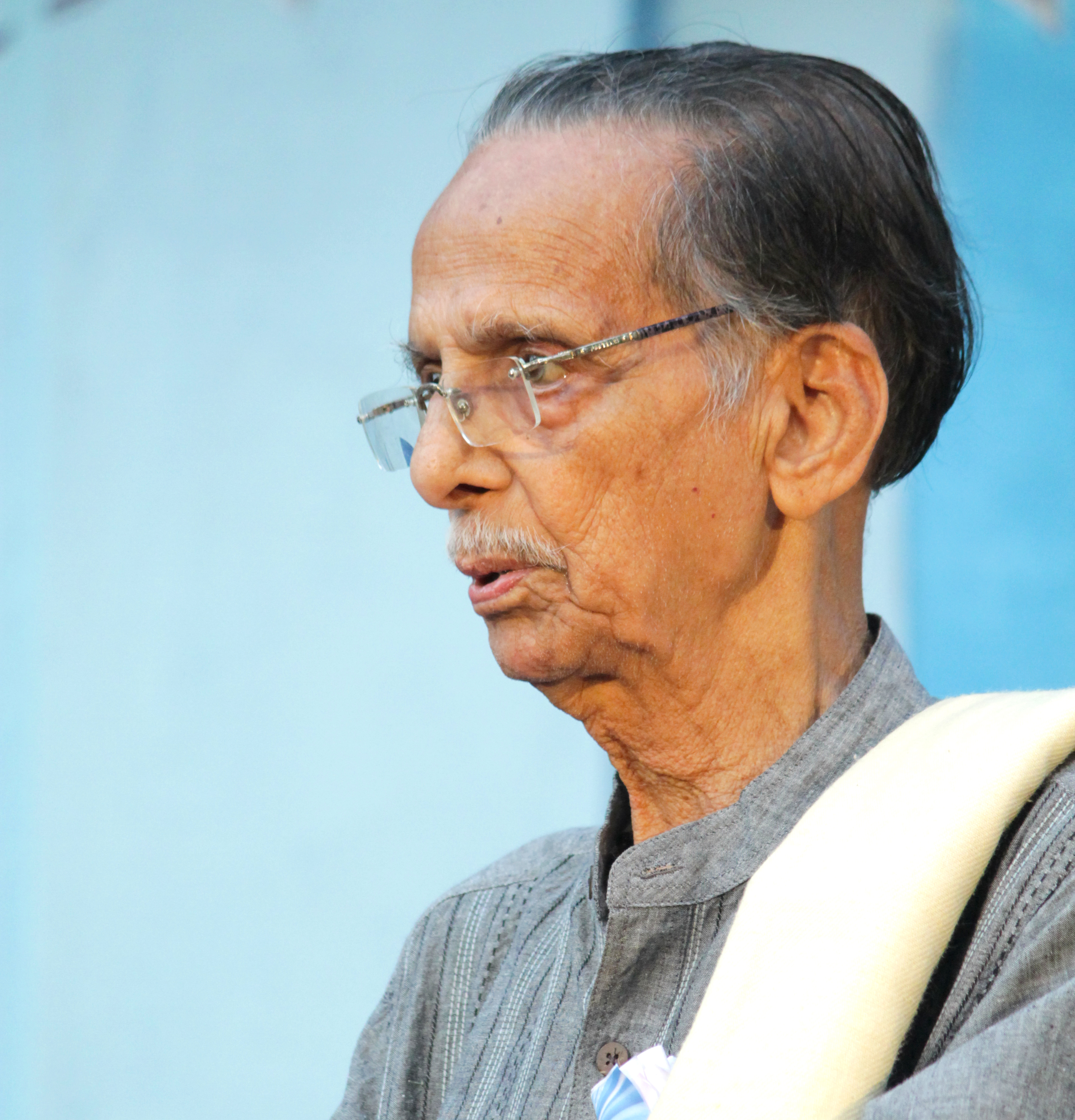
- Kavalam Narayana Panicker
- Born: 1 May 1928; Kavalam, Alappuzha
- Died: 26 June 2016 (aged 88); Thiruvananthapuram, Kerala, India
- Occupations: Poet, playwright, theatre director, lyricist
- Spouse: Saradamani (m. 1952–2016)
- Children: Kavalam Harikrishnan (1953–2009); Kavalam Sreekumar (b. 1959)

Kavalam Narayana Panikkar (1 May 1928 – 26 June 2016) was an Indian dramatist, theater director, and poet. He wrote over 26 Malayalam plays, many adapted from classical Sanskrit drama and Shakespeare, notably Kalidasa's Vikramorvasiyam (1981, 1996), Shakuntalam (1982), Bhasa's Madhyamavyayogam (1979), Karnabharam (1984, 2001), Uru Bhangam (1988), Swapnavasavadattam, and Dootavakyam (1996). He was the founder – director of theatre troupe, Sopanam, which led to the foundation of Bhashabharati: Centre for Performing Arts, Training and Research, in Trivandrum.

He was awarded the Sangeet Natak Akademi Award for Direction in 1983 by Sangeet Natak Akademi, and its highest award for lifetime achievement, the Sangeet Natak Akademi Fellowship in 2002. In 2007, he was awarded the Padma Bhushan in the field of Arts, by the Government of India. He died at his residence on 26 June 2016, aged 88, a few days after returning from the hospital.

== Early life and education ==
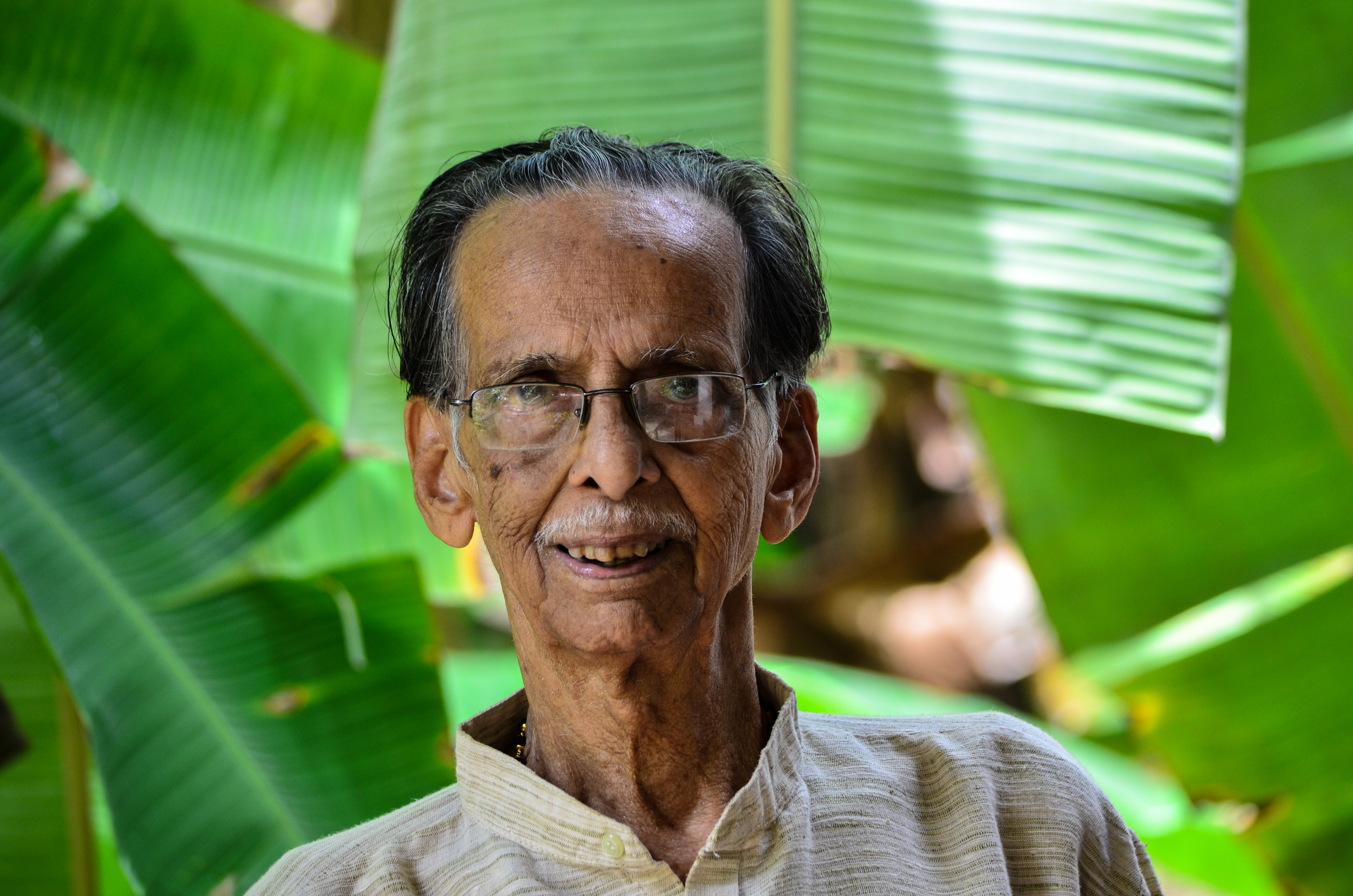
Kavalam Narayana Panicker

He was born in the village of Kavalam, into an ancient family from Kuttanad in Alappuzha, Kerala, India. His family name was Chalayil and he was a nephew of Sardar Kavalam Madhava Panikkar and a cousin of Dr. K. Ayyappa Panicker, a Malayalam poet.

He attended CMS College in Kottayam, whose alumni included K. P. S. Menon and his uncle Sardar K. M. Panikkar. He obtained a degree in economics from Sanatana Dharma College (SD College), Alappuzha and later a Bachelor of Laws degree from Madras Law College.

== Career ==
He started his career as a lawyer in 1955 and practiced law for six years before devoting himself to art and literature. In 1961 he was appointed Secretary of the Kerala Sangeetha Nadaka Academy, Thrissur and shifted his base to Thrissur, the cultural capital of Kerala. His work has always been rooted in both the classical and folk traditions of Kerala.

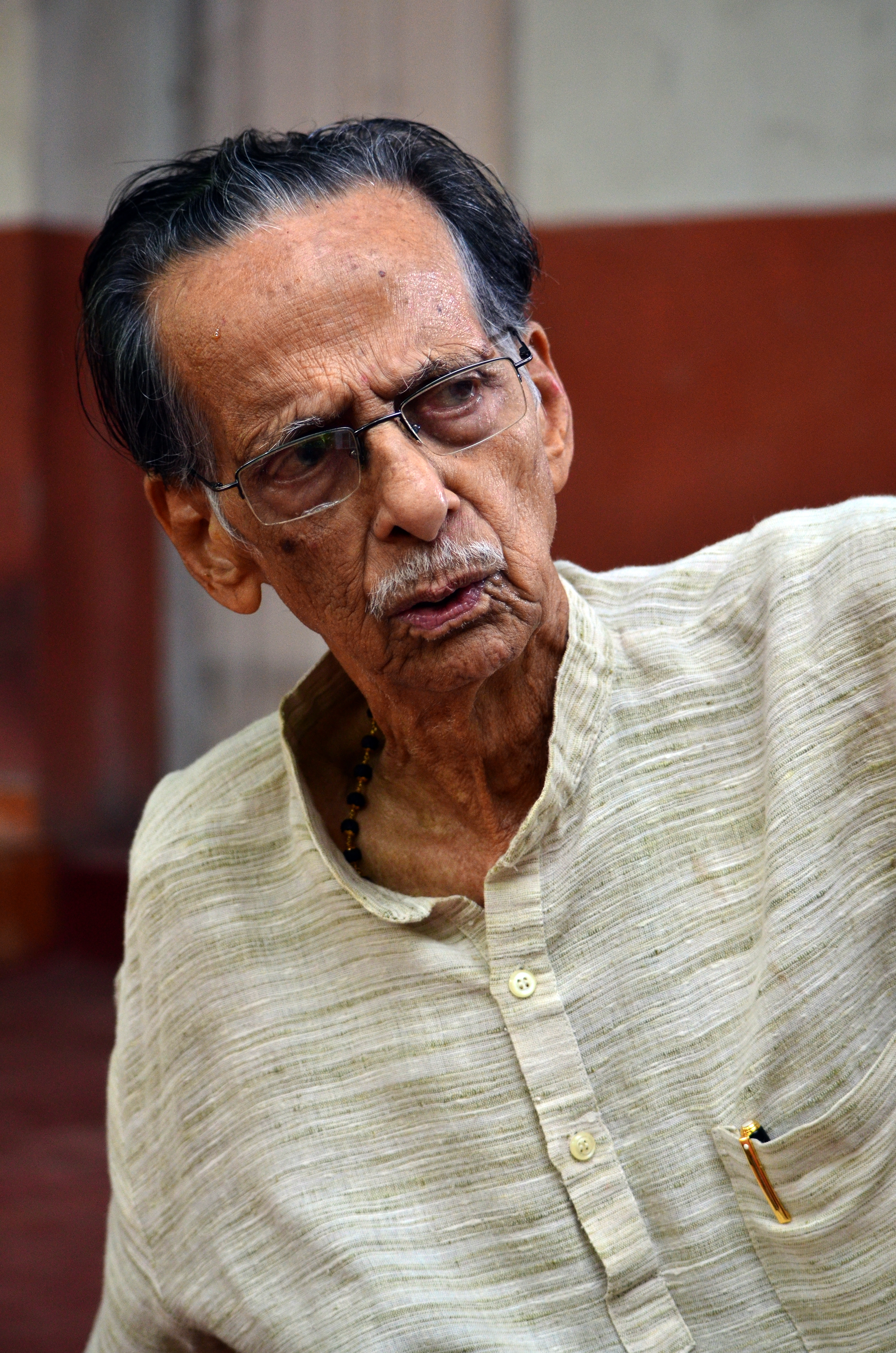
Kavalam Narayana Panicker

In 1974, Kavalam moved his residence to the state capital Thiruvananthapuram. In this period his play Avanavan Kadamba was filmed by G. Aravindan. He has worked in many countries, including the former Soviet Union. In Greece he worked with Greek artists on a production of the Ilyayana, a fusion of the Indian Ramayana and the Greek epic Iliad.

He has directed two movies about the greatest Kutiyattam maestro legendary actor Guru Mani Madhava Chakyar: Mani Madhava Chakyar: The Master at Work (1994) and Parvati Viraham (1993) in Kuttiyattam form featuring Mani Madhava Chakyar as Ravana. As a lyricist in Malayalam cinema, he has written for films like Ulsavapittennu, Manjadikuru (2008), Vadakakkoru Hridayam (1978) and Marmaram (1982). He won Kerala State Film Award for Best Lyrics for the latter two films.

In 1993 Erin B. Mee directed his play Ottayan in New York City. The Village Voice noted, "the haunting pungency of a rich Asian folk-theatre tradition shines through every stylized gesture."

Erin B. Mee devoted an entire chapter of her book Theatre of Roots to Panikkar's work. His work is also the subject of the volume K.N. Panikkar: The Theatre of Rasa edited by Udayan Vajpeyi. His play Aramba Chekkan is included in Drama Contemporary: India, edited by Erin B. Mee and Erin B. Mee conducted an interview with him for PAJ magazine and his work is the subject of an interview by Erin B. Mee in Seagull Theatre Quarterly: 1995 "The Use of Folk Philosophy in Kavalam Narayana Panikkar's Poetic Theatre of Transformation." Seagull Theatre Quarterly 7:58-62.

He served as a remained a consultant at Asianet Communications and as vice-chairman of the Sangeet Natak Akademi, New Delhi.

== Personal life ==
Kavalam lived in Thiruvananthapuram with his wife Saradamani and also had another house in his native village of Kavalam. He had two sons — Kavalam Harikrishnan and Kavalam Sreekumar. Kavalam Harikrishnan, the elder son, served as Bhasabharathi's Chief contact person before he died of cancer in October 2009. His younger son Kavalam Sreekumar, is a singer in Kerala. Sreekumar sang folk and light music numbers over three decades. He also sang for Malayalam films over the years.

== Awards and recognition ==
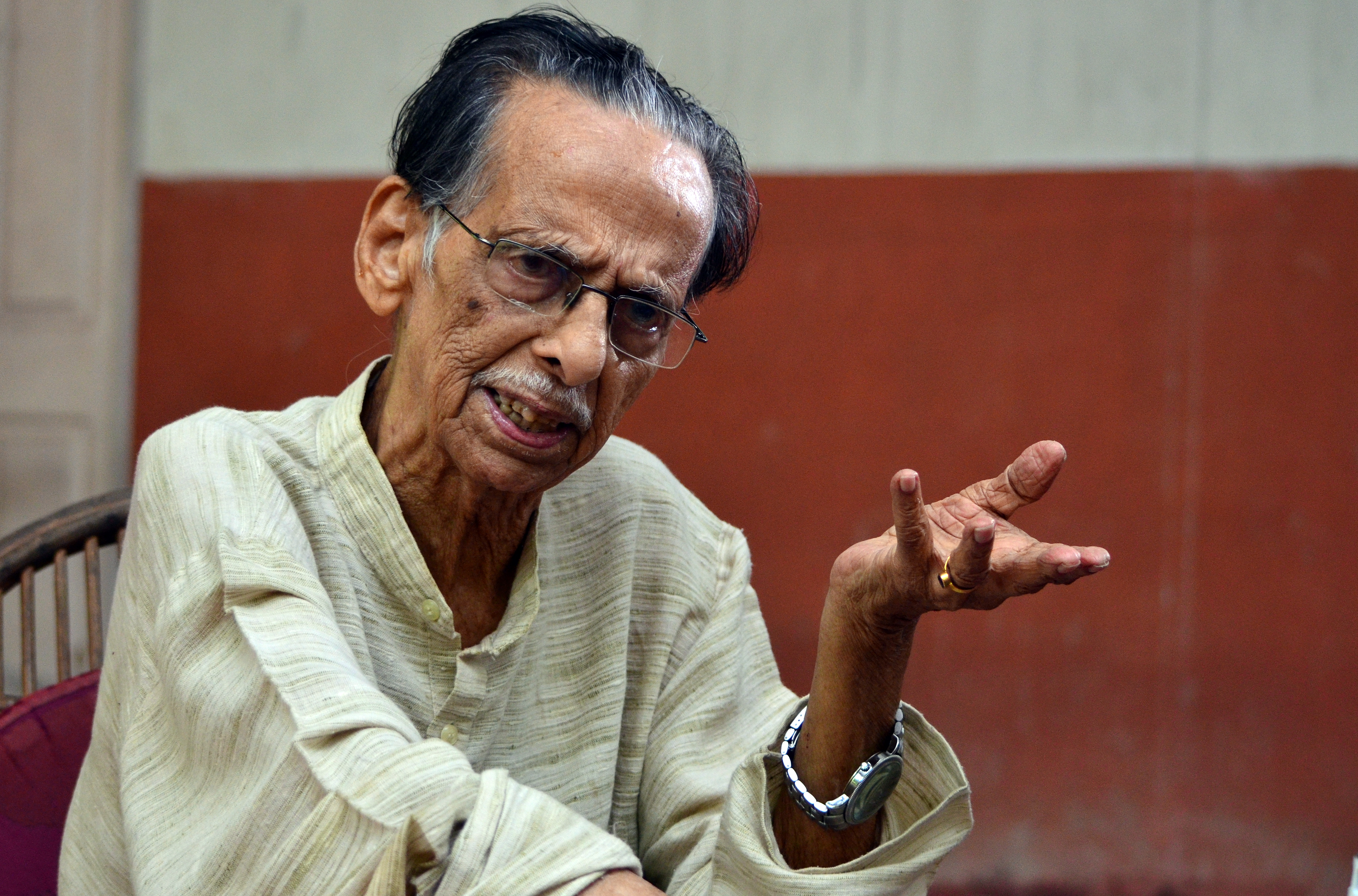
Kavalam Narayana Panicker

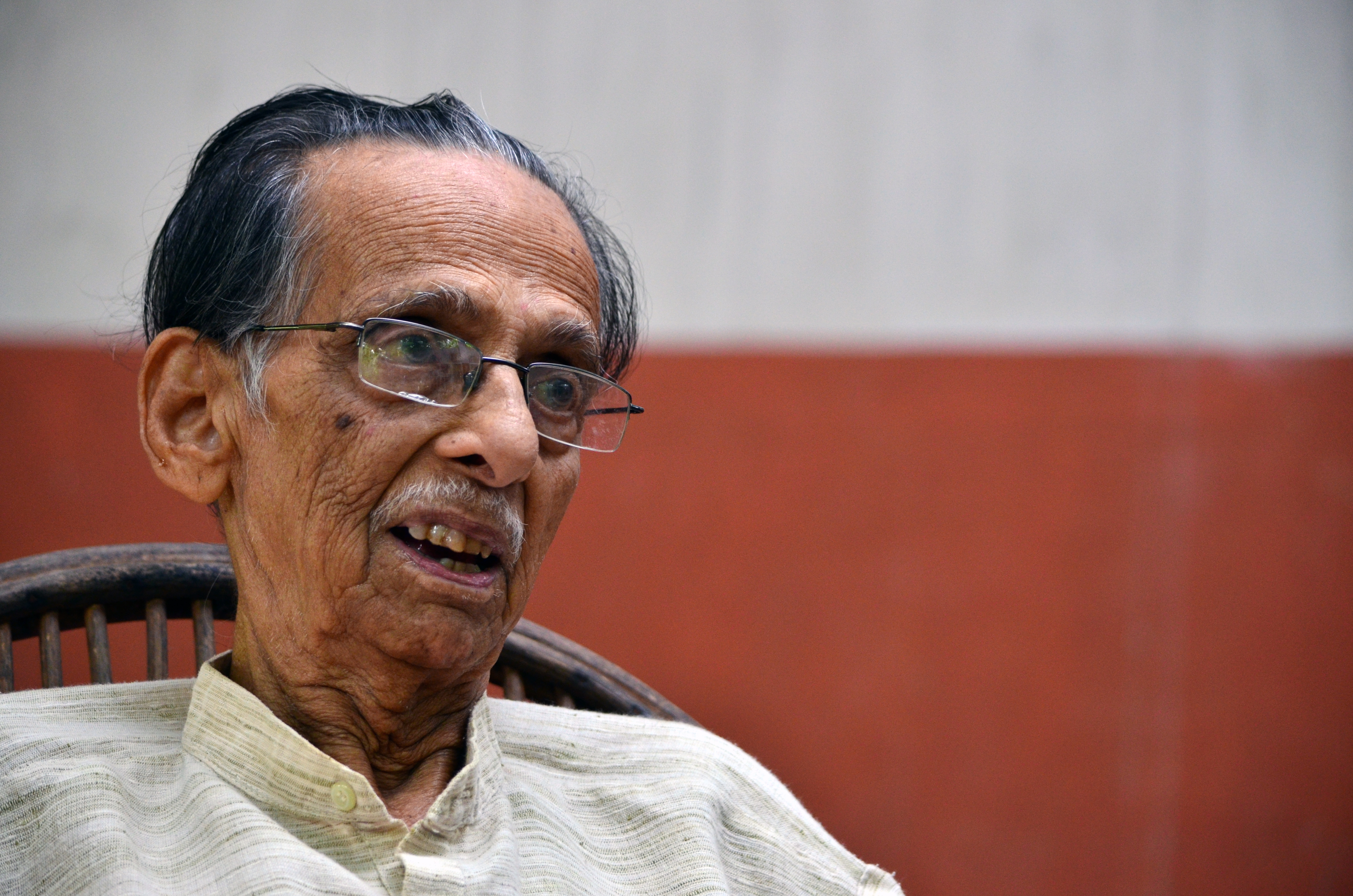
Kavalam Narayana Panicker

He was awarded Sangeet Natak Akademi Award in 1983 and Sangeet Natak Akademi Fellowship in 2002 and the Padma Bhushan civilian decoration in 2007. He received the Kerala Sangeetha Nataka Akademi Fellowship in 2000.

He has won Kerala State Film Award for Best Lyrics twice, in 1978 for Vadakakkoru Hridayam and in 1982 for Marmaram, and the Kalidas Samman by the Government of Madhya Pradesh in (1994–1995).

Other

- 2013 – TTK Prestige-Vanitha Film Awards – Best Lyricist – Amen

Best Male Singer

- 2013 – Asiavision Awards – Best Lyricist

== Works ==
- The Right to rule (Kōyma); and, The domain of the sun (Sūryasthāna). Seagull Books, 1989. ISBN 81-7046-071-9.
- Folklore of Kerala. National Book Trust, India, 1991.
- Karimkutty; and, The lone tusker. Seagull Books, 1991. ISBN 81-7046-092-1.

== Bibliography ==
- Mee, Erin B. 2008 Theatre of Roots: Redirecting the Modern Indian Stage. Seagull Books.
- Mee, Erin B. 1995. "Kavalam Narayana Panikkar: Meaning Into Action." PAJ #55.
- Mee, Erin B. 1995 "The Use of Folk Philosophy in Kavalam Narayana Panikkar's Poetic Theatre of Transformation." Seagull Theatre Quarterly 7:58-62.
- Panikkar, K. N. "Aramba Chekkan" In Mee, Erin B. ed. 2001. DramaContemporary:India. Baltimore: Johns Hopkins University Press
- Cody, Gabrielle H.; Evert Sprinchorn (2007). The Columbia encyclopedia of modern drama, Volume 2. Columbia University Press. ISBN 978-0-231-14424-7.
- Kavalam Narayana Panicker at IMDb
