= Pancharātra =

Pancharātra is a Sanskrit drama written by Bhasa. The plot is based on the Hindu epic Mahabharata.

The play takes its name from the period of five nights referred in the plot. Pancha(५) means Five(5) and Raatra means nights. The Pandavas were roaming in the forest for twelve years. Dronacharya who was the teacher of both the pandavas and kauravas knew Duryodhana's (leader of kauravas) reluctance to give the land to the Pandavas. He predicted a war and to avoid such a calamity he was looking for an opportunity. So he asked Duryadhona to perform sacrifice and at the sacrifice, Duryadhona took a bath and asked for gurudakshini (the act of repaying one's guru). Drona cleverly demanded half of the land for the Pandavas. Duryadhona agreed but on one condition that he would provide him with the whereabouts about the pandavas within five nights. Drona agreed and was successful and hence half of the kingdom was handed to the pandavas.

== See also ==
- Sanskrit literature
- Sanskrit drama
