= Rasa (aesthetics) =

Aesthetic concept in Indian arts related to emotions and feelings

In Indian aesthetics, a rasa (Sanskrit: रस) literally means "juice, essence or taste." It is a concept in Indian arts denoting the aesthetic flavour of any visual, literary or musical work that evokes an indescribable feeling in the reader or audience. It refers to the emotional flavors/essence crafted into the work by the writer or a performer and relished by a 'sensitive spectator' or sahṛdaya, literally one who "has heart," and can connect to the work with emotion, without dryness.

Rasas are created by one's bhava (one's state of mind).

The rasa theory has a dedicated section (Chapter 6) in the Sanskrit text Natya Shastra, an ancient text on the arts from the 1st millennium BCE, attributed to Bharata Muni. However, its most complete exposition in drama, songs and other performance arts is found in the works of the Kashmiri Shaivite philosopher Abhinavagupta (c. 1000 CE), demonstrating the persistence of a long-standing aesthetic tradition of ancient India. According to the Rasa theory of the Natya Shastra, entertainment is a desired effect of performance arts but not the primary goal. Instead, the primary goal is to transport the audience into another, parallel reality full of wonder and bliss, where they experience the essence of their consciousness and reflect on spiritual and moral questions.

Although the concept of rasa is fundamental to many forms of Indian arts, including dance, music, theatre, painting, sculpture, and literature, the interpretation and implementation of a particular rasa differ between different styles and schools. The Indian rasa theory is also found in the Hindu arts and Ramayana musical productions of Bali and Java (Indonesia), but with regional creative evolution.

== Role in art ==
According to the Natya Shastra, a rasa is a synthetic phenomenon and the goal of any creative performance art, oratory, painting or literature. Wallace Dace translates the ancient text's explanation of rasa as "a relish that of an elemental human emotion like love, pity, fear, heroism or mystery, which forms the dominant note of a dramatic piece; this dominant emotion, as tasted by the audience, has a different quality from that which is aroused in real life; rasa may be said to be the original emotion transfigured by aesthetic delight."

Rasas are created through various means, and the ancient Indian texts discuss many such means. For example, one way is through the actors' gestures and facial expressions. Expressing Rasa in classical Indian dance form is referred to as Rasa-abhinaya. Some modern commentators have emphasized the psychophysical dimension of rasa. For example, the French philosopher Martine Chifflot argues that classical Indian conceptions of theatrical and musical art presuppose that rasa and raga can "have a very real influence on psychophysical and even spiritual states", an efficacy that she considers largely diminished in contemporary Western theatre. This interpretation has been compared to the ideas of Antonin Artaud, who, drawing in part on Balinese theatre, called for a form of performance capable of exerting a similarly transformative effect on the spectator's organism.

The theory of rasas forms the aesthetic underpinning of all Indian classical dance and theatre, such as Bharatanatyam, Kathakali, Kathak, Kuchipudi, Odissi, Manipuri, Kudiyattam, and others.

In Indian classical music, each raga is an inspired creation for a specific mood, where the musician or ensemble creates the rasa in the listener. However, predominantly all ragas and musical performances in Hindu traditions aim at one of six rasas, wherein music is a form of creating "love, compassion, peace, heroism, comic or the feeling of wonder" within the listener. Anger, disgust, fear and such emotions are not the subject of rasa, but they are part of Indian theories on dramatic arts. Of the six rasa that are aimed at in Indian music, each has sub-categories. For example, love rasa in Hindu literature has many musical flavors, such as erotic love (sringar) and spiritual devotional love (bhakti).

Rasa is a fusion of word and meaning,
that bathes the minds of readers,
with savor of bliss.
It is the truth of poetry,
shining without cessation.
Clear to the heart,
it is yet beyond the words.

— Hrsikesa

In the theories of Indian poetics, ancient scholars state that a literary composition's effectiveness depends on what is stated and how it is stated (words, grammar, rhythm), which creates its rasa. Among the most celebrated of these theories of poetics and literary works are the 5th-century Bhartrhari and the 9th-century Anandavardhana. However, the theoretical tradition of integrating rasa into literary works likely returns to a more ancient period. This is generally discussed under the Indian concepts of Dhvani, Sabdatattva and Sphota.

For example, the literary work Bhagavata Purana deploys rasa, presenting the bhakti of Krishna in aesthetic terms. The rasa it presents is an emotional relish, a mood called Sthayi Bhava. This development towards a relishable state is created through emotional conditions which are called Vibhavas, Anubhavas and Sanchari Bhavas. Vibhavas means Karana or cause: it is of two kinds - Alambana, the personal or human object and substratum, and Uddipana, the excitants. Anubhava, as the name signifies, means the ensuants or effects of emotion. Sanchari Bhavas are those passing feelings which are ancillary to a mood. Later scholars added more emotional states, such as the Sattvika Bhavas.

In the Indian theories on sculpture and architecture (Shilpa Shastras), the rasa theories, in part, drive the forms, shapes, arrangements and expressions of images and structures. Some Indian texts on sculpture suggest nine rasas.

=== Poetry ===
According to rasa theory, the immediate value of poetry for the reader is an enjoyable experience. The earliest evidence of rasa is in Sanskrit poetry, specifically in the Ramayana of Valmiki where Valmiki experiences shoka (grief). While Valmiki was responding to a real experience of sorrow, later thinkers "came to understand that rasa cannot be a response to the real world, the world outside the theater."

== Sahṛdayatā ==
Abhinavagupta defines sahṛdaya in Locana, his commentary on Dhvanyāloka. Sahṛdaya-s are those spectators who:

1. "have been exposed to appreciation of literary work and who have made it a habit to think about the literary work"
2. "because of this previous exposure, they attuned their minds to create the reflection of poetic emotions in their minds"

In his philosophical work, Abhinavagupta believed that sahṛdayatā (aesthetic sensitivity), is crucial within the context of music and bhakti. Abhinavgupta suggests that fullness of delight is essential for developing aesthetic sensitivity. This delight is not limited to pleasant experiences but also includes painful ones, as both can lead to an expansion of consciousness. He emphasizes that the capacity for enjoyment is closely linked to receptivity to the ultimate experience and labels those unable to appreciate good music as "ahrdaya" (heartless, insensitive). Aesthetic sensitivity is viewed as a necessary condition for spiritual sensibility, both expressed by the term sahṛdayatā.

== History ==
The word rasa appears in ancient Vedic literature. In Rigveda, it connotes a liquid, an extract and flavor. (Note: See Rigvedic hymns 1.187.4–5 composed by Agastya, for example. The entire hymn praises liquid extracts of foods as the spirits of great gods, the source of great strength within humans, as Agastya glorifies foods. Sanskrit: तव त्ये पितो रसा रजांस्यनु विष्ठिताः । दिवि वाता इव श्रिताः ॥४॥ तव त्ये पितो ददतस्तव स्वादिष्ठ ते पितो । प्र स्वाद्मानो रसानां तुविग्रीवा इवेरते ॥५॥) In Atharvaveda, rasa in many contexts means "taste", and also the sense of "the sap of grain". According to Daniel Meyer-Dinkgräfe, rasa in the Upanishads refers to the "essence, self-luminous consciousness, quintessence" and "taste" in some contexts. (Note: Many Upanishads use the word rasa. For example, the "Ananda Valli" section of the Taittiriya Upanishad states, "rasa is essence par excellence, the universal essence/bliss". (रसो वै सः । रसँ ह्येवायं लब्ध्वाऽऽनन्दी भवति ।)) (Note: The philosophical or mystical meaning of rasa is common in the bhasya or commentaries on the Principal Upanishads of Hinduism. For example, Adi Shankara comments that rasa means "bliss as is innate in oneself and manifests itself even in the absence of external stimuli" because bliss is a non-material state that is spiritual, subjective and an intrinsic state of a human being. Happiness, to Shankara, does not depend on others or external, material things; it is a state one discovers and reaches within oneself through atma-jnana (self-knowledge).) In post-Vedic literature, the word generally connotes "extract, essence, juice or tasty liquid."

In an aesthetic sense, Rasa is suggested in the Vedic literature, but the oldest surviving manuscripts describing the rasa theory of Hinduism are of the Natya Shastra. The Aitareya Brahmana in chapter 6, for example, states:

Now (he) glorifies the arts,
the arts are refinement of the self (atma-samskrti).
With these the worshipper recreates his self,
that is made of rhythms, meters.

— Aitareya Brahmana 6.27 (~1000 BCE), Translator: Arindam Chakrabarti

The Natya shastra presents the rasa theory in Chapter 6. The text begins its discussion with a sutra called the rasa sutra:

Rasa is produced from a combination of Determinants (vibhava), Consequents (anubhava) and Transitory States (vyabhicaribhava).

— Natyashastra 6.109 (~200 BCE–200 CE), Translator: Daniel Meyer-Dinkgräfe

According to the Natya shastra, the goals of theatre are to empower aesthetic experience and deliver emotional rasa. The text states that the aims of art are manifold. In many cases, it aims to produce repose and relief for those exhausted with labor, distraught with grief, laden with misery, or struck by austere times. However, entertainment is an effect, yet not the primary goal of arts, according to the Natya shastra. The primary goal is to create rasa to lift and transport the spectators towards the expression of ultimate reality and transcendent values.

The Abhinavabhāratī is the most studied commentary on Natyasastra, written by Abhinavagupta (950–1020 CE), who also referred to Natyasastra as the Natyaveda. Abhinavagupta's analysis of Natyasastra is notable for its extensive discussion of aesthetic and ontological questions. According to Abhinavagupta, the success of an artistic performance is measured not by the reviews, awards or recognition the production receives, but only when it is performed with skilled precision, devoted faith and pure concentration, so that the artist gets the audience emotionally absorbed into the art and immerses the spectator with the pure joy of a rasa experience.

== Elements ==
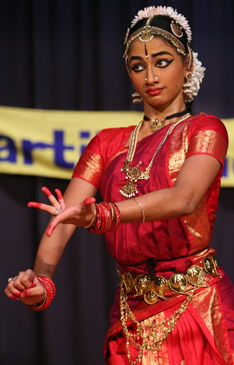
Expression of Sringāra (Romance) in Bharatanatyam

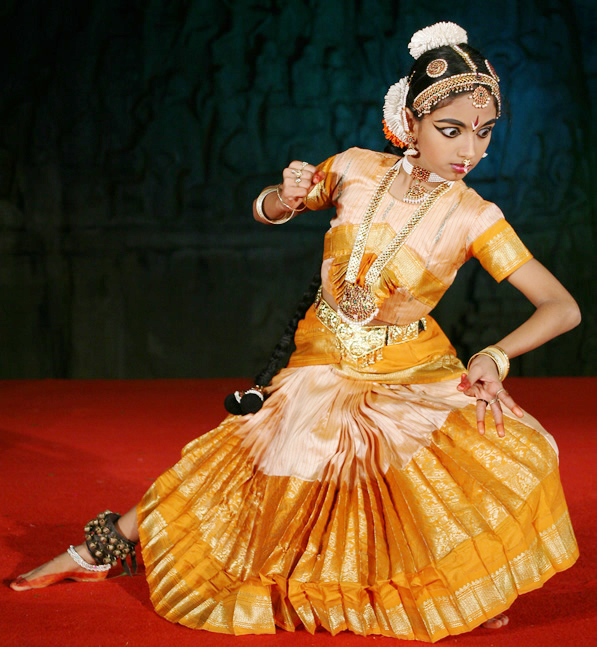
Raudram rasa of the destructive fury of goddess Durga in Bharatanatyam

Bharata Muni enunciated the eight rasas in the Nātyasāstra, an ancient Sanskrit text of dramatic theory and other performance arts, written between 200 BC and 200 AD. In the Indian performing arts, a rasa is a sentiment or emotion evoked in each audience member by the art. The Natya Shastra mentions six rasa in one section, but in the dedicated section on rasa, it states and discusses eight primary rasa. According to Nātyasāstra, each rasa has a presiding deity and a specific colour. There are 4 pairs of rasas. For instance, Hāsya arises out of Sringara. The Aura of a frightened person is black, and the aura of an angry person is red. Bharata Muni established the following:

- Śṛṅgāraḥ (शृङ्गारः): Romance, Love, attractiveness. Presiding deity: Vishnu. Colour: Śyāma (Dark-brown-black)
- Hāsyam (हास्यं): Laughter, mirth, comedy. Presiding deity: Shiva. Colour: white
- Raudram (रौद्रं): Fury. Presiding deity: Rudra. Colour: red
- Kāruṇyam (कारुण्यं): Compassion, mercy. Presiding deity: Yama. Colour: grey
- Bībhatsam (बीभत्सं): Disgust, aversion. Presiding deity: Mahakala. Colour: blue
- Bhayānakam (भयानकं): Horror, terror. Presiding deity: Kāla. Colour: black
- Vīram (वीरं): Heroism. Presiding deity: Indra. Colour: Bright White
- Adbhutam (अद्भुतं): Wonder, amazement. Presiding deity: Brahma. Colour: yellow

=== Śāntam rasa ===
Later authors added a ninth rasa. This addition had to undergo much struggle between the sixth and tenth centuries before it could be accepted, and the expression "Navarasa" (the nine rasas) could become established.

- Śāntam: Peace or tranquility. deity: Vishnu. Colour: perpetual white.

Shānta-rasa functions as an equal member of the set of rasas, but it is simultaneously distinct as being the most clear form of aesthetic bliss. Abhinavagupta likens it to the string of a jeweled necklace; while it may not be the most appealing for most people, it is the string that gives form to the necklace, allowing the jewels of the other eight rasas to be relished. Relishing the rasas and particularly shānta-rasa is implied to be almost as good as, but never relatively equal to, the bliss of self-realization experienced by yogis.

== List of bhavas ==
According to the Natyashastra, bhavas are of three types: sthayi (stable), sanchari (travelling) and sattvika (pure). These classifications are based on how the rasas are developed or enacted during the aesthetic experience. This is seen in the following passage:

पुनश्च भावान्वक्ष्यामि स्थायिसञ्चारिसत्त्वजान्॥६.१६॥ (transl. Again I shall declare the beings born of the permanent and moving beings.)

=== Sthayi ===
The Natyasastra lists eight Sthayibhavas with eight corresponding rasas:

- Rati (Love)
- Hasya (Mirth)
- Soka (Sorrow)
- Krodha (Anger)
- Utsaha (Energy)
- Bhaya (Terror)
- Jugupsa (Disgust)
- Vismaya (Astonishment)

=== Sattvika ===
The Natyasastra outlines eight anubhavas or sattvika bhavas:

- Stambha (Stupefaction)
- Sveda (Sweating)
- Romancha (Feeling thrilled)
- Svarabheda (Break in voice)
- Vepathu (Trembling)
- Vaivaranya (Pallor)
- Ashru (Tears)
- Pralaya (Swoon or death)

== Influence on cinema ==
In Hindi cinema, it is the theme of the film Naya Din Nayi Raat, where Sanjeev Kumar plays nine characters corresponding to the nine Rasas.

== See also ==
- Abhinaya
- Natya Shastra
- Rasa lila
- Telugu literature
- Sanskrit Literature
- Sanskrit Theatre
