= Sringara =

One of the nine rasas

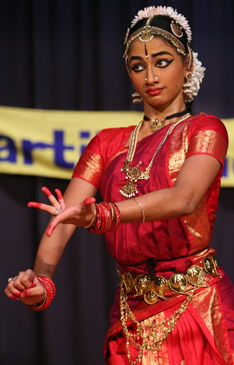
Expression of Sringāra in Bharatanatyam

Sringara (Sanskrit: शृङ्गार, śṛṅgāra) is one of the nine rasas, usually translated as erotic love, romantic love, or as attraction or beauty. Rasa means "flavour", and the theory of rasa is the primary concept behind classical Indian arts including theatre, music, dance, poetry, and sculpture. Much of the content of traditional Indian arts revolves around the relationship between a man and a woman. The primary emotion thus generated is Sringara. The romantic relationship between lover and beloved is a metaphor for the relationship between the individual and the divine.

Classical theater/dancers (i.e. Bharatanatyam, Odissi, Mohiniyattam) refer to Sringara as 'the Mother of all rasas.' Sringara gives scope for a myriad of other emotions including jealousy, fear, anger, compassion, and of course for the expression of physical intimacy. No other Rasa has such a vast scope.

The treatment and performance of Sringara varies on a large scale from the grotesque (as in Koodiyattam) to very refined and subtle (as in some styles of Bharatanatyam, or in Odissi).

The attraction between lover and beloved is a metaphor for the relationship between the individual and the divine, the Nara-Narayana relationship. Natya Shastra lists Vishnu as the presiding deity of the Sringara rasa.

== See also ==
- Natyakalpadrumam
- Kutiyattam
- Mohiniyattam
- Māni Mādhava Chākyār
