= Bharata (sage) =

Ancient Indian sage

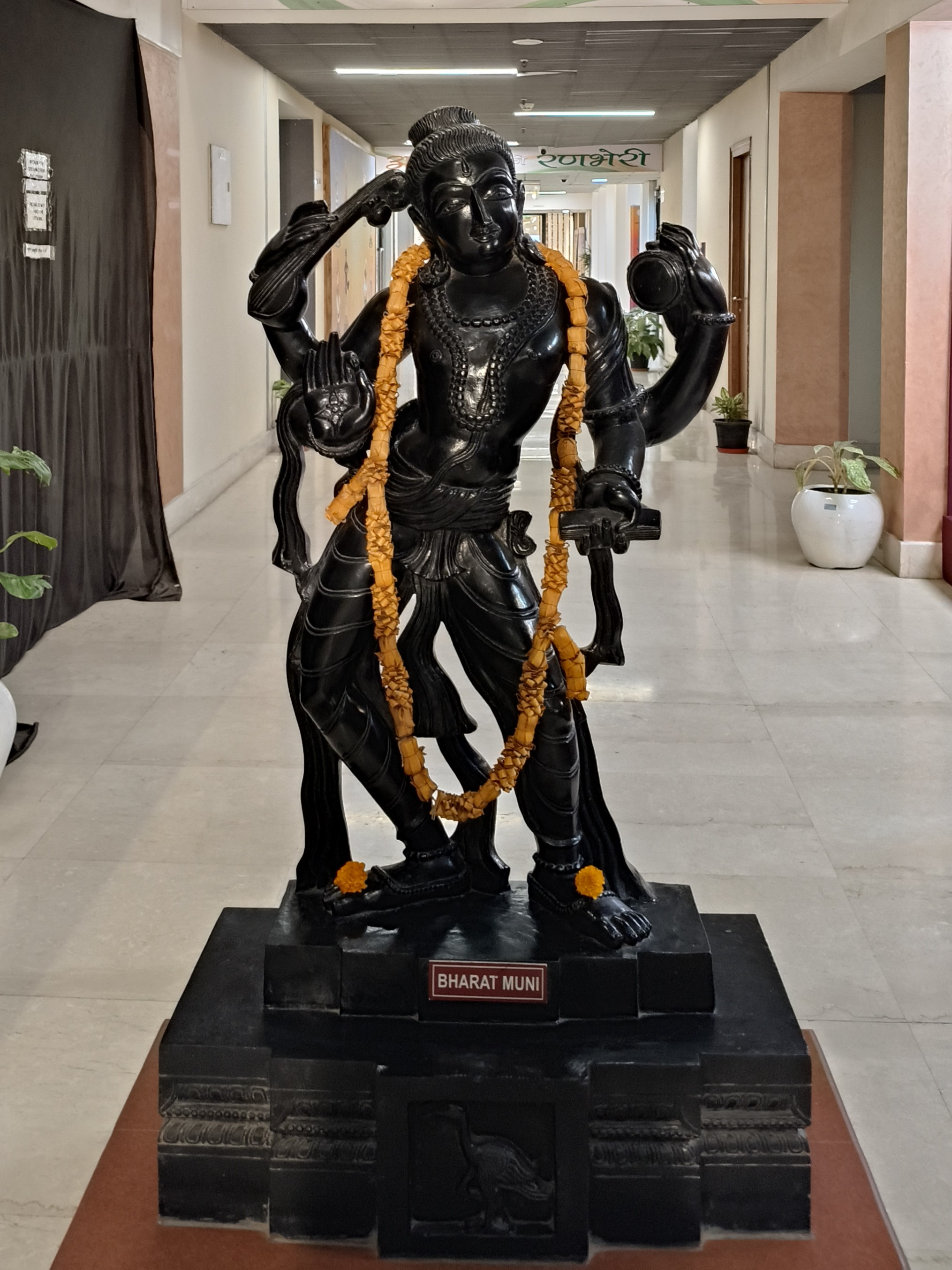
An image of Bharata Muni at Indira Gandhi National Centre for the Arts, Delhi

Bharata (Devanagari: भरत) was a muni (sage) of ancient India. He is traditionally attributed authorship of the influential performing arts treatise Natya Shastra, which covers ancient Indian dance, poetics, dramaturgy, and music.

== Identity ==
He is thought to have lived between 200 BCE and 200 CE, but estimates vary between 500 BCE and 500 CE.

== Nāṭya Śāstra ==
Bharata is known only as being traditionally attributed authorship of the treatise Natya Shastra. All other early Sanskrit treatises were similarly attributed to mythical sages. The text draws on his authority, as existing in the public imagination.

The Nāṭya Śāstra is notable as an ancient encyclopedic treatise on the performing arts, which has influenced dance, music and literary traditions in India. It is also notable for its aesthetic "Rasa" theory, which asserts that entertainment is the desired effect of performance arts but not the primary goal and that the primary goal is to transport the individual in the audience into another parallel reality, full of wonder, where he experiences the essence of his own consciousness and reflects on spiritual and moral questions.
