= Tourist attractions in Thalassery =

The Thalassery carnival, the Beach fest in Muzhappilangad beach and Dharmadam beach are notable attractions. The area's four rivers (Anjarakkandi, Dharmadam, Koduvally and Mahe) around Thalassery town and four beaches (Muzhappilangad, Dharmadam, Thalassery (2 beaches)) with more in Kannur also attract visitors.

== Kalari Payattu ==
It is an important center of Kalari payattu and health tourism. Other visitors come to experience Theyyam and explore the area's history, such as Tellicherry Fort.

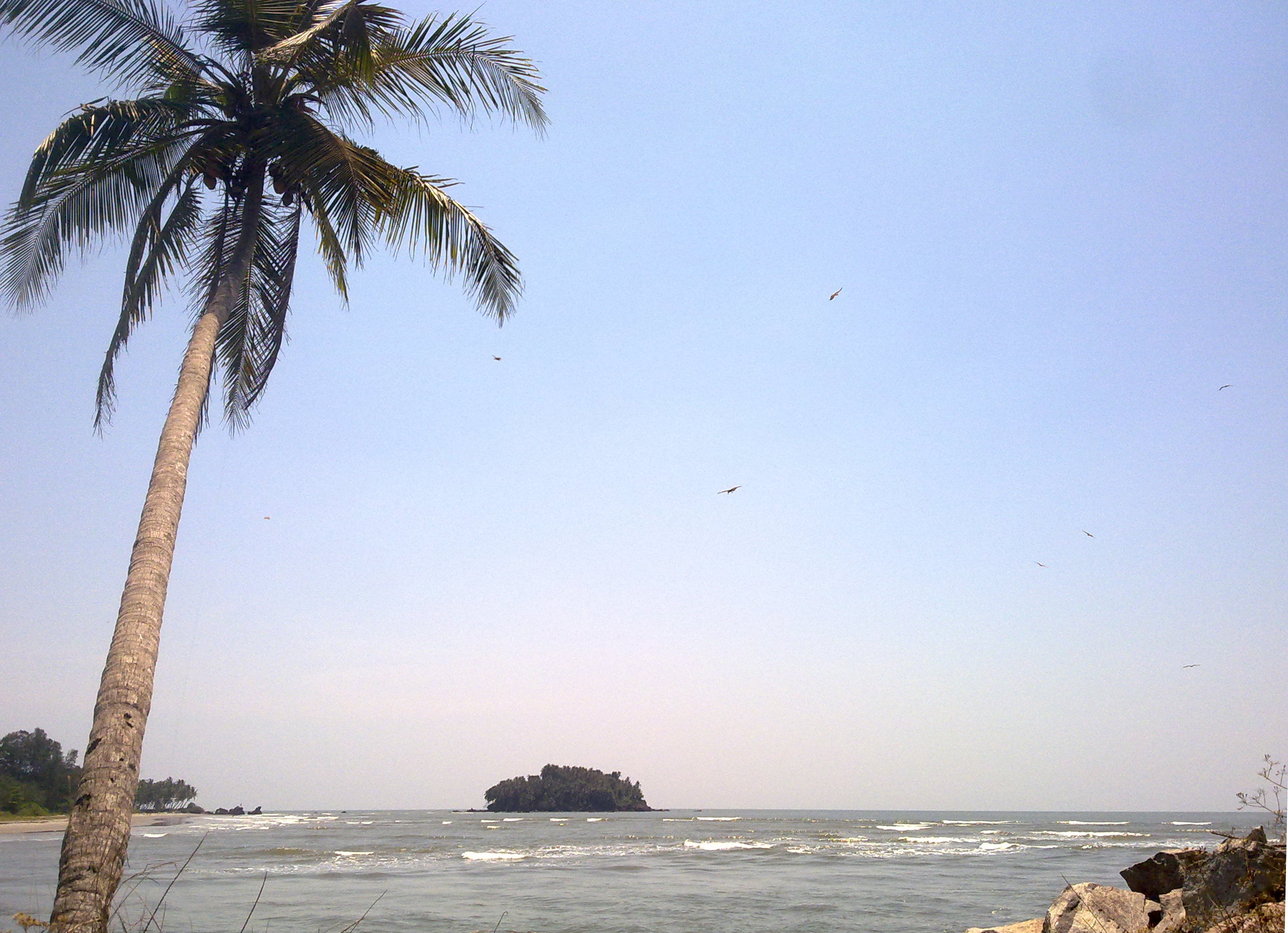
Dharmadam Beach and Island

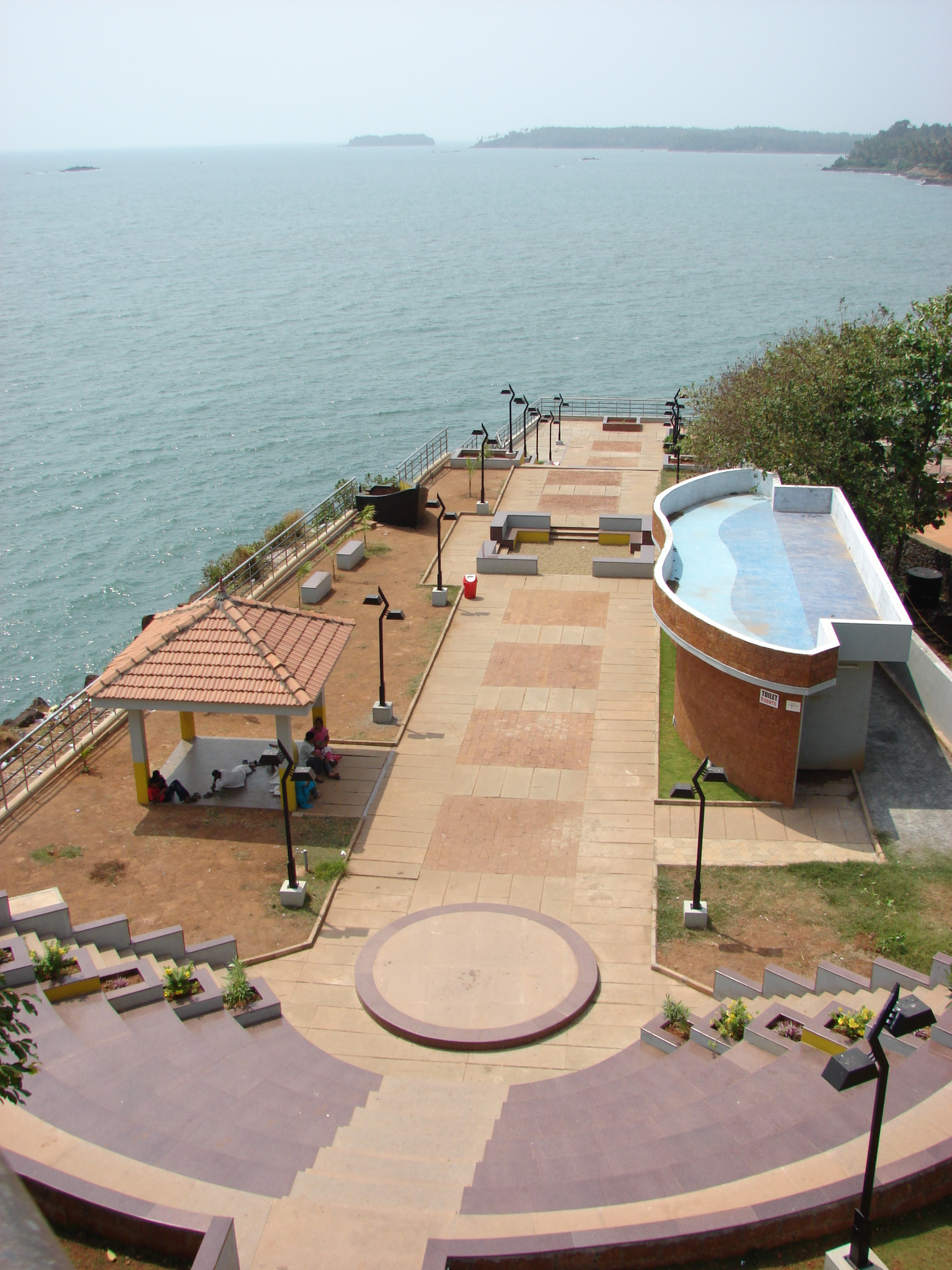
Overbury's Folly, Thalassery

Thalassery Pier (Kadalpaalam), Overbury's Folly, Pazhassi Dam and Reservoir garden and Malayala Kala Gramam, New Mahe,(7 km from Thalassery) are other attractions

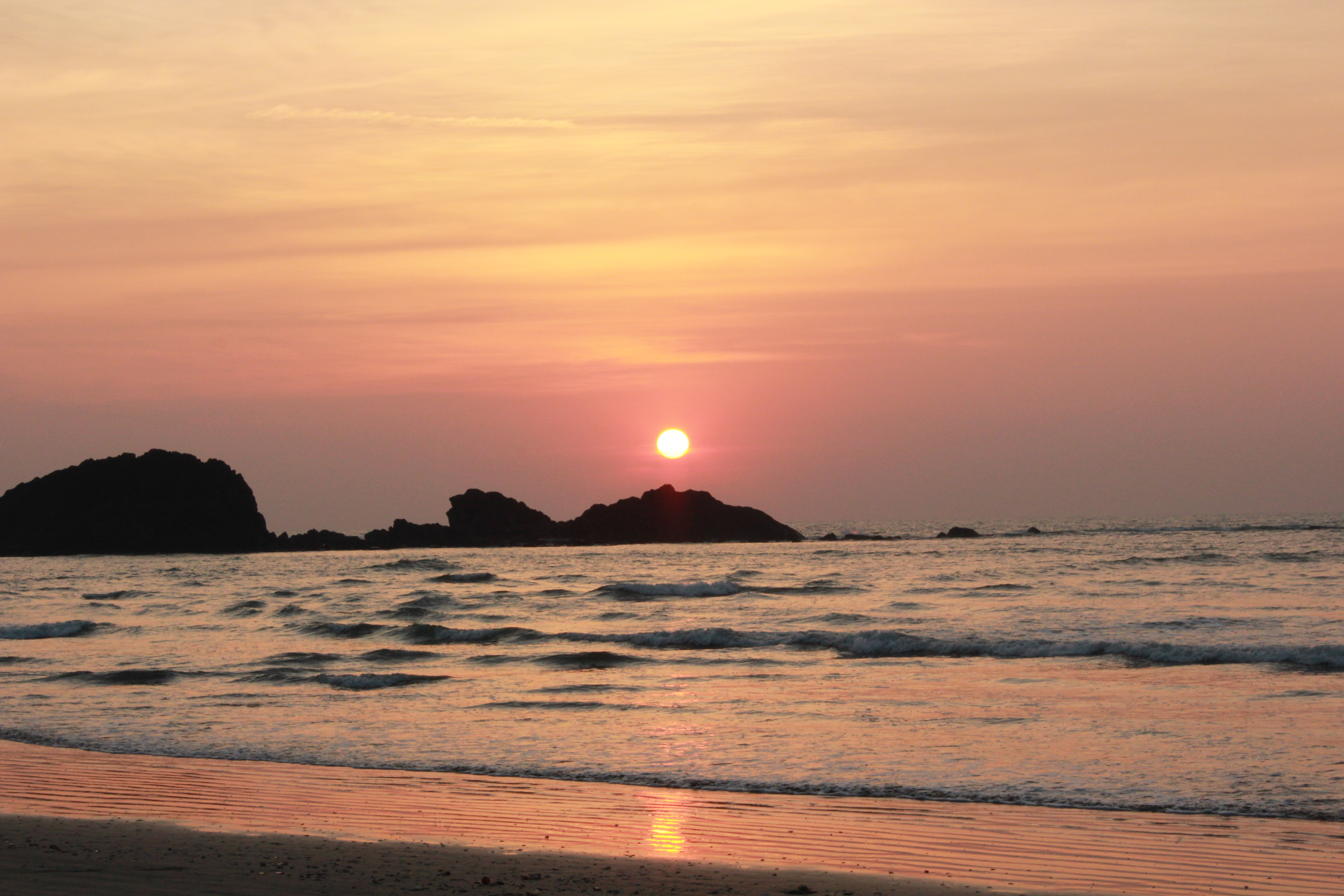
Muzhappilangad Beach

A shipwreck is visible near the Thalassery shore.

== Thalassery Fort ==
Tellicherry Fort is in Thalassery (Tellicherry) a town in Kannur District of Kerala state in south India.

The British East India Company built the fort in 1708 to establish a stronghold on the Malabar Coast. In 1781 Hyder Ali, ruler of the Kingdom of Mysore, was unsuccessful in capturing the Fort in his campaign to control Malabar. His successor, Tipu Sultan, was forced to cede Malabar District to the British in 1792, at the conclusion of the Third Anglo-Maratha War.

The square fort, with its massive walls, strong flanking bastions, secret tunnels to the sea and intricately carved huge doors, is an imposing structure. The fort was once the nucleus of Thalassery's development. It is now a historical monument preserved by Archaeological Survey of India.

== Places of worship ==
- St. Theresa Cathedral, Mahe
- Sree Jagannath Temple: Sree Gnanodayayogam is a social organisation of North Malabar and the governing body of Sree Jagannath Temple, Thalassery. The temple was consecrated in 1908 by Sree Narayana Guru. Sree Varadur Kunhi Kannan visited Guru Dev in December 1904 and suggested that Thiyya Community build a temple at Thalassery. Guru Dev allowed Varadur to invite Kumaran Asan as his representative, and to convene meetings with citizens to ascertain the feasibility of a Temple. Asan accepted the invitation. On his arrival the first meeting was convened at 'Parambath House' of Sree Cheruvari Shirastadar on 9 July 1905. The temple is open to people of all casts; during the period where there was huge caste discrimination prevalent in the society.

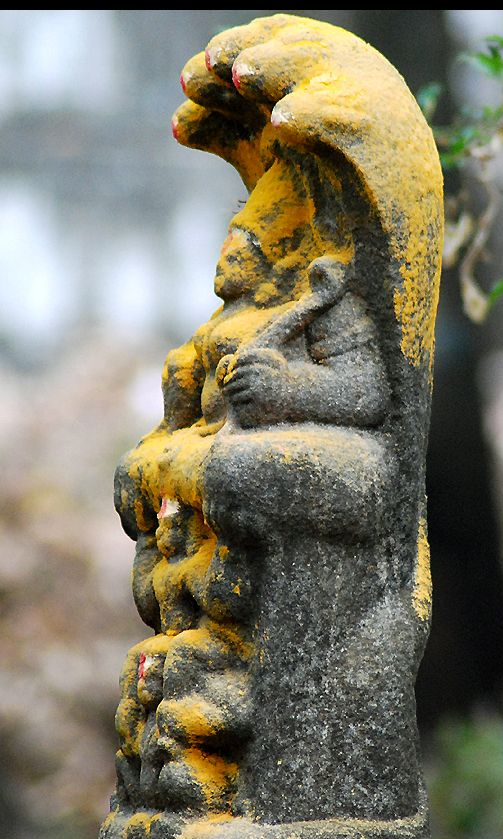
Sarpa Kavu

- Sree Andaloor Kavu

The presiding deity is Rama, worshiped as a forest dweller as depicted in Araṇya Kāṇḍa, Kishkindha Kāṇḍa, Sundara Kāṇḍa and Yuddha Kāṇḍa of Ramayana. Lakshmana and Hanuman who accompanied Rama in his forest life are other deities worshiped there. Andaloor is believed to have derived from "Aandava villor" (the land where the Lord's sacred bow was kept). Andaloor kavu is well known for Vaishnavite theyyam. During the festival season in Kumbham, Dharmadam village adapts a vegetarian diet. They purchase new utensils and clothes and paint their homes. Villoppikkal (Bow offering), Meyyalu koodal (a "rush" that ritually accompanies Rama in the battle against Ravana) and Kuluthattal are rituals performed by the men.

- Odathil Palli

The 200-year-old Odathil Palli mosque is in Thalassery. Its site used to be a sugarcane garden of the Dutch. It changed hands to the British East India Company. It has typical Kerala architecture and it is in the heart of Tellicherry. The crown on the roof is made of gold. The mosque is still in use for worship.

- Thiruvangad Sree Ramaswami Temple

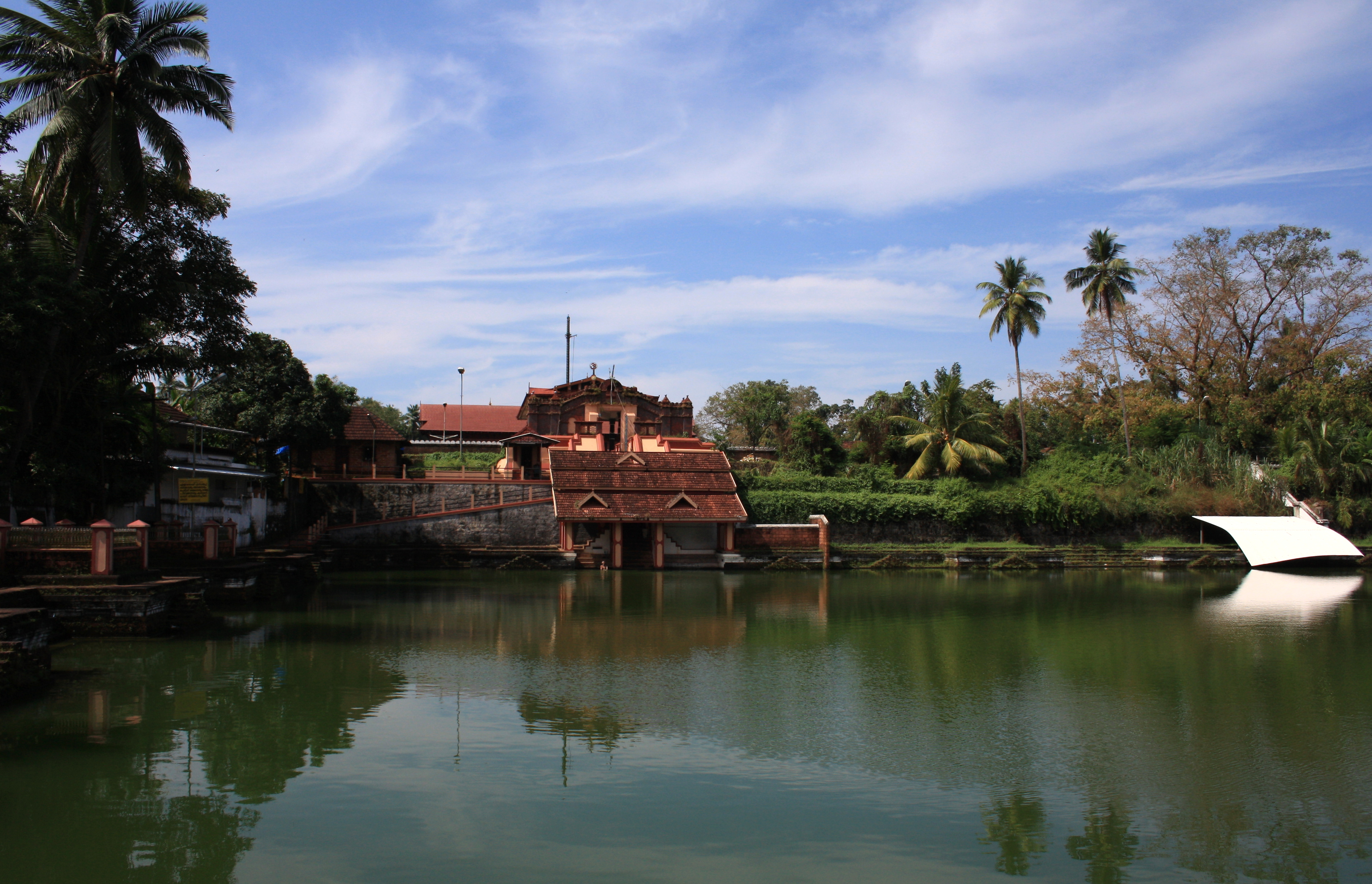
The Thiruvangad Shree Ramaswamy Temple pond

Sree Ramaswami Temple is dedicated to Sree Rama, in Thiruvangad. It is one of the four important temples dedicated to Sree Rama in Kerala. (The other three are at Triprayar, Thiruvilluamala and Kadalur.) It is Located on an elevated plot of 2.75 hectares with an adjoining temple tank known as Chira that occupies one hectare. It has excellent wood carvings, terra cotta and murals carved on wooden planks in the ceilings.

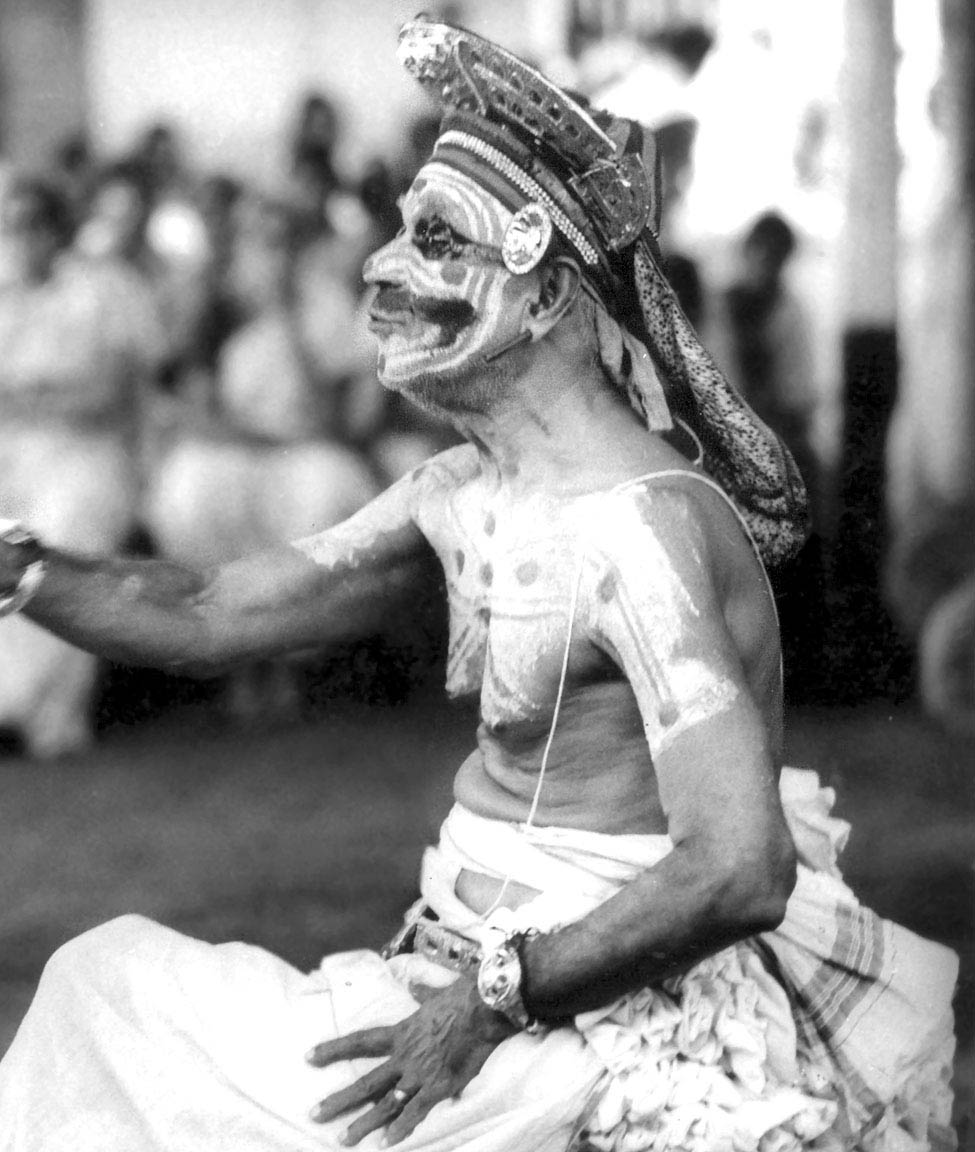
Chakyar Koothu in Tiruvangad Temple

- Kottiyoor Vadakkeshwaram Temple

Kottiyoor Mahadeva Temple is 60 km east of Thalassery in Thalassery Taluk. An annual pilgrimage attracts thousands of visitors. It commemorates the Daksha yaga.

- Tirunelli Temple

Tirunelli is a Mahavishnu temple in the Brahmagiri valley. It is a destination for "Pitru Tarpana" in North Kerala. The temple is centuries old and is still incomplete due to the feud between local rulers at that time. The pledge taken in front of Tirunelli Perumal is considered to have the highest value. Tirunelli is 108 km east of Thalassery.

- Mamanam Shri MahaDevi temple

The Maha Devi (Bhadrakali) shrine is located in Irikkur, near Anjarakkandy. It is 39 km east of Thalassery. It hosts shrines for Mahadeva, Saptha Mathrukkal and Sasthavu. The shrine is revered among the local community and others. The shrine had been attacked by the Mysorean army and later renovated. The rites changed from Dakshninachara (Sathvika) to Vamachara (Saktheya) after a 16th-century renovation.

- Lokanar Kavu

Lokanar Kavu is situated near Vatakara, 22 km south of Thalassery. It was established by ancient Aryan immigrants in the region. Its "Lokambika" deity is one of the four Durga Peetham of Kerala (with Moolambika, Hemambika and Balaambika (Devi Kanya Kumari)) worshiped by Parashurama. The temple is the family deity of Kalari payattu martial artists and is mentioned in related folklore.

- Other Major Shrines

Other religious structures include St. Theresa’s Cathedral, Mahe (7 km from Thalassery), Chirakkakavu Bhagavathi Temple, Shri Moozhikkara Bhagavati Temple, Kottayam Shiva Temple, Sri Lakshmi Narasimha Swami Temple, Mariamman Koil, Melut Sri Muthappan Madappura, Kaitheri Neelakaringali Amma Temple, Shri Porkali Bhagavathi Temple and Arakkal Dhanwantari Temple.
