= Killikkurussi Shiva temple =

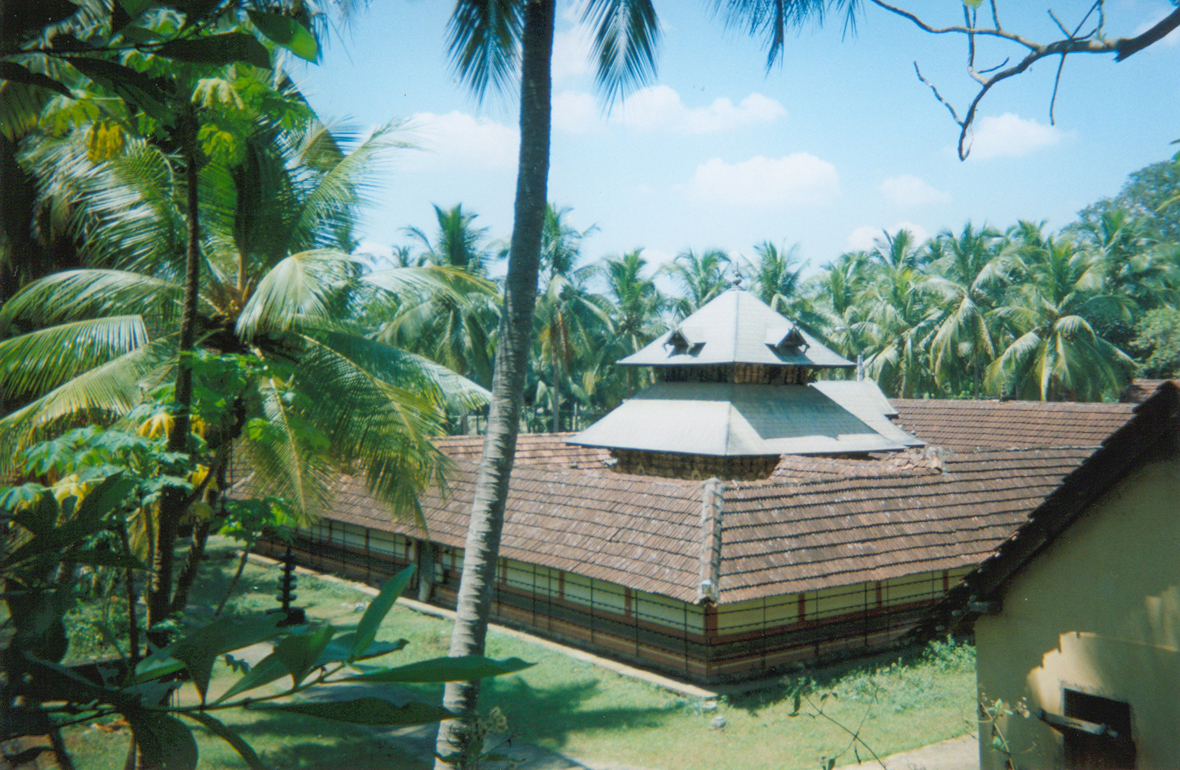
- Killikkurussi Mahadeva Temple

- Mahadeva temple, Killikkurussi, Palakkad, Kerala

Religion
- Affiliation: Hinduism
- District: Palakkad
- Deity: Shiva
- Festival: Maha Shivaratri

Location
- Location: Killikkurussi
- State: Kerala
- Country: India
- Interactive map of Killikkurussi Shiva temple
- Coordinates: 10.765304°N 76.436653°E

Architecture
- Type: Architecture of Kerala

Specifications
- Temple: One
- Elevation: 86.96 m (285 ft)

Killikkurussi Shiva temple or Killikkurussi Mahadeva temple or "Killikkurussimangalam Shiva temple" is a Siva temple situated at Killikkurussi in the neighbourhood of Lakkidi, Palakkad, Kerala in India. This temple is dedicated to Shiva. This is listed as 82nd temple of 108 Siva temples.

== Location ==
This temple is located with the geographic coordinates of (10.765304°N 76.436653°E) at an altitude of about 86.96 metres (285.3 ft) above the mean sea level at Lakkidi.

Killikkurussi Shiva temple (Kerala)
