= Thalassery Stadium =

Cricket ground in India

Coordinates: 11.7509°N 75.4857°E

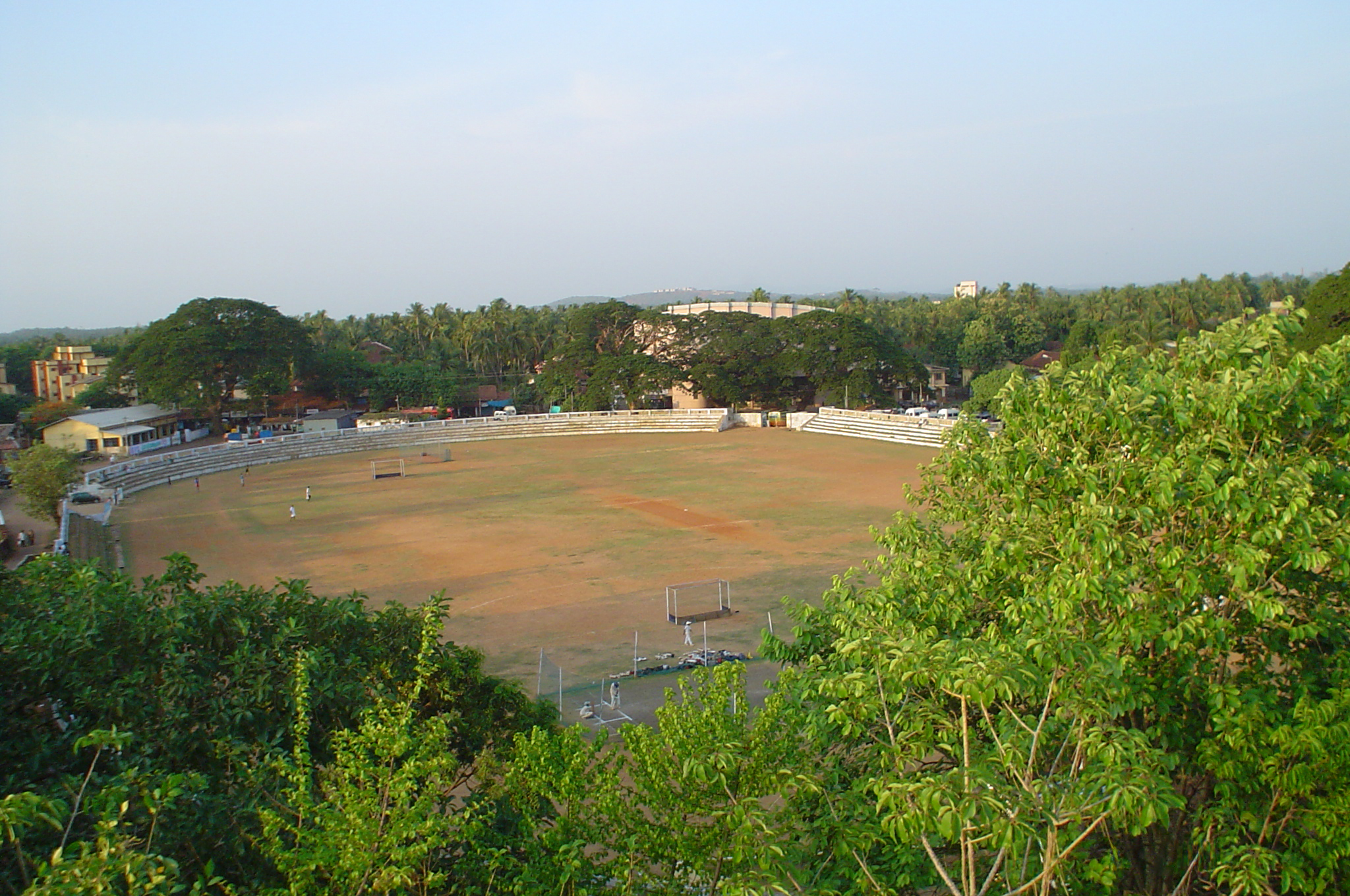
View of Thalassery Stadium

Thalassery Stadium (also known as Thalassery Municipal Cricket Ground) is located near the Thalassery Civil Station, Kerala state, South India. Thalassery Stadium hosts the Ranji Trophy cricket matches every year. It has a capacity of 7,500.

== History ==
On this ground, the first ball was bowled in the early 19th century, thanks to Colonel Arthur Wellesley, who brought the game to this Malabar town. In 2002, Thalassery cricket ground celebrated its 200th birthday by hosting a one-day cricket match between India and Sri Lanka sides containing former Test players.

== See also ==
- Thalassery Pier
- Thalassery Fort
- Overbury's folly
- Thalassery
