= Killikkurussimangalam =

- Village
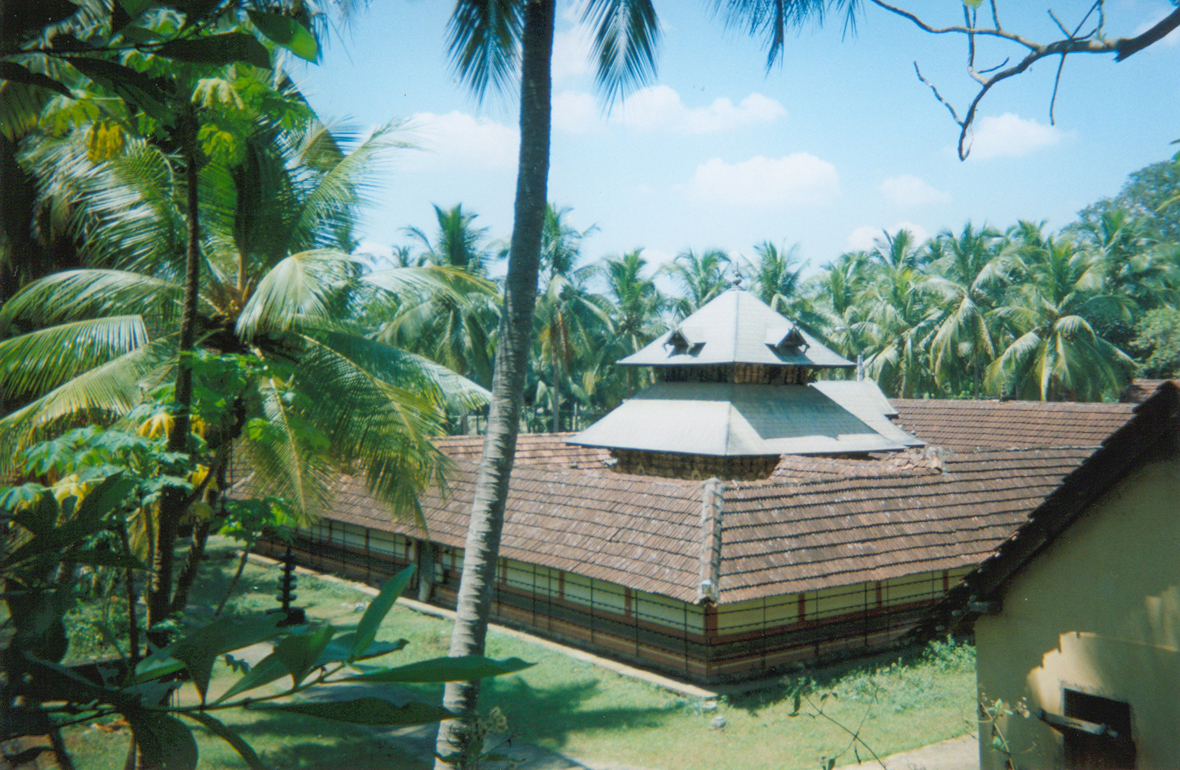
- Sri Killikkurussi Mahadeva Kshetram- Shiva Temple of Killikkurussimangalam
- Interactive map of Killikkurussimangalam
- Coordinates: 10.766°N 76.436°E
- Country: India
- State: Kerala
- District: Palakkad

Languages
  - Official: Malayalam, English
- Time zone: UTC+5:30 (IST)

Killikkurussimangalam (also known as Lakkidi) is a village around 8 km from nearby town Ottappalam in Palakkad district of Kerala, south India. The river Nila (Bharatapuzha) flows through the southern border of Lakkidi.

== Etymology ==
The village got its name from the famous Lord Siva temple - Sri Killikkurussi Mahadeva Kshetram situated in the village. The temple is very old and legends say it has been founded by the sage Sree Suka Brahma Hrishi.

== Kunchan Nambiar's birthplace ==
The village is the birthplace of famous Malayalam satire poet and founder of the Ottamthullal art form, Kunchan Nambiar (Rama panivada). The house where Kunchan Nambiar was born, Kalakkathu Bhavanam, is now a cultural centre, undertaken by Department of Culture of Kerala State Government. There is also a library situated there in memory of Kunchan Nambiar called Kunchan Smaraka Vayanasala - Kunchan Memorial Library.

Koodiyattam and Chakyar koothu artist and noted Natyashasthra scholar Nātyāchārya Vidūshakaratnam Padma Shri Guru Mani Madhava Chakyar, who was the authority of Abhinaya (acting) was also lived there. His home is near to the Killikkurussi Mahadeva temple. It is also the hometown of one of Chakyar's prominent disciples, Guru Kelu Nair.

Sanskrit scholar Koppattu Achutha Pothuval also lived near the temple.

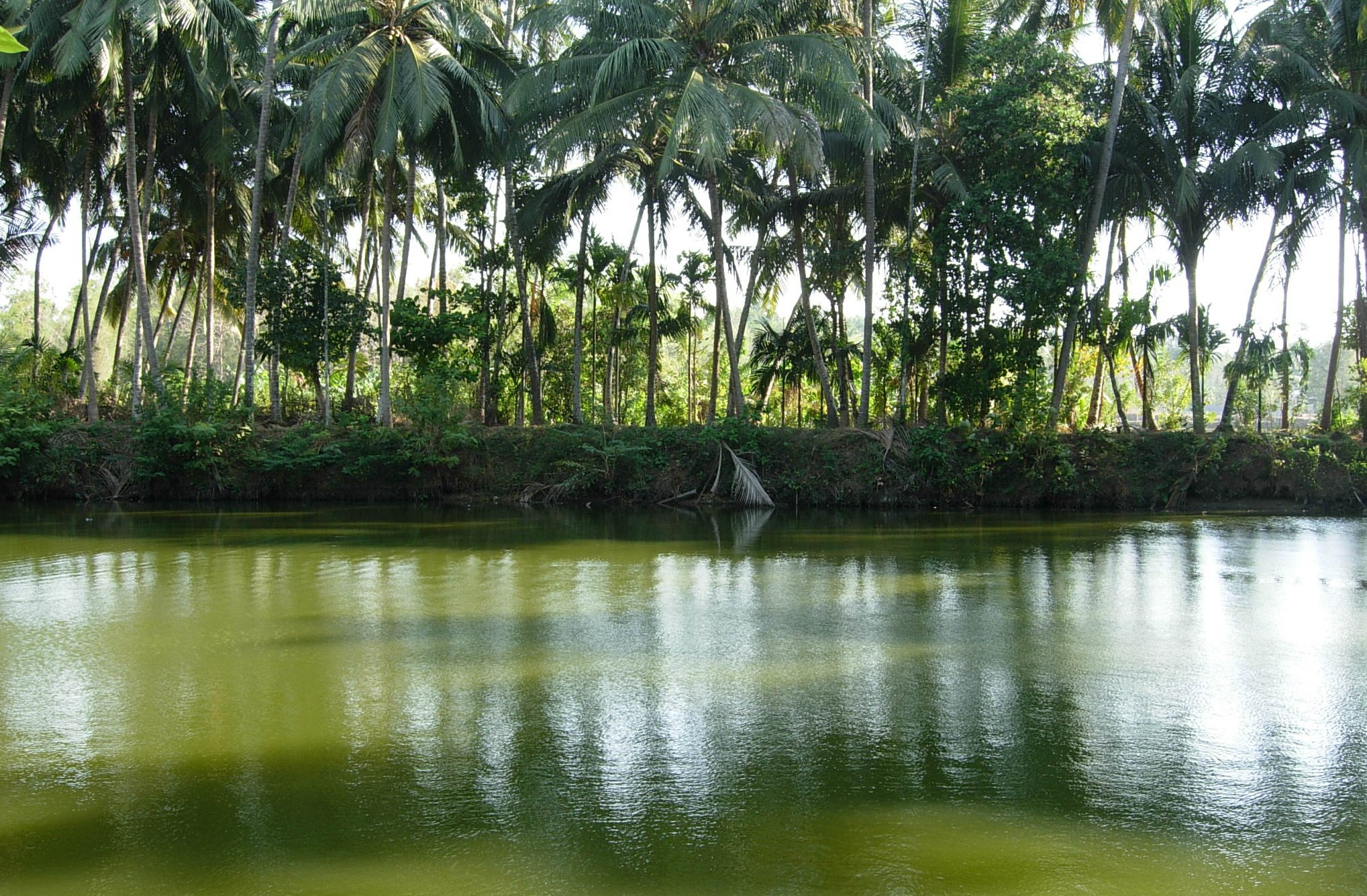
Temple pond

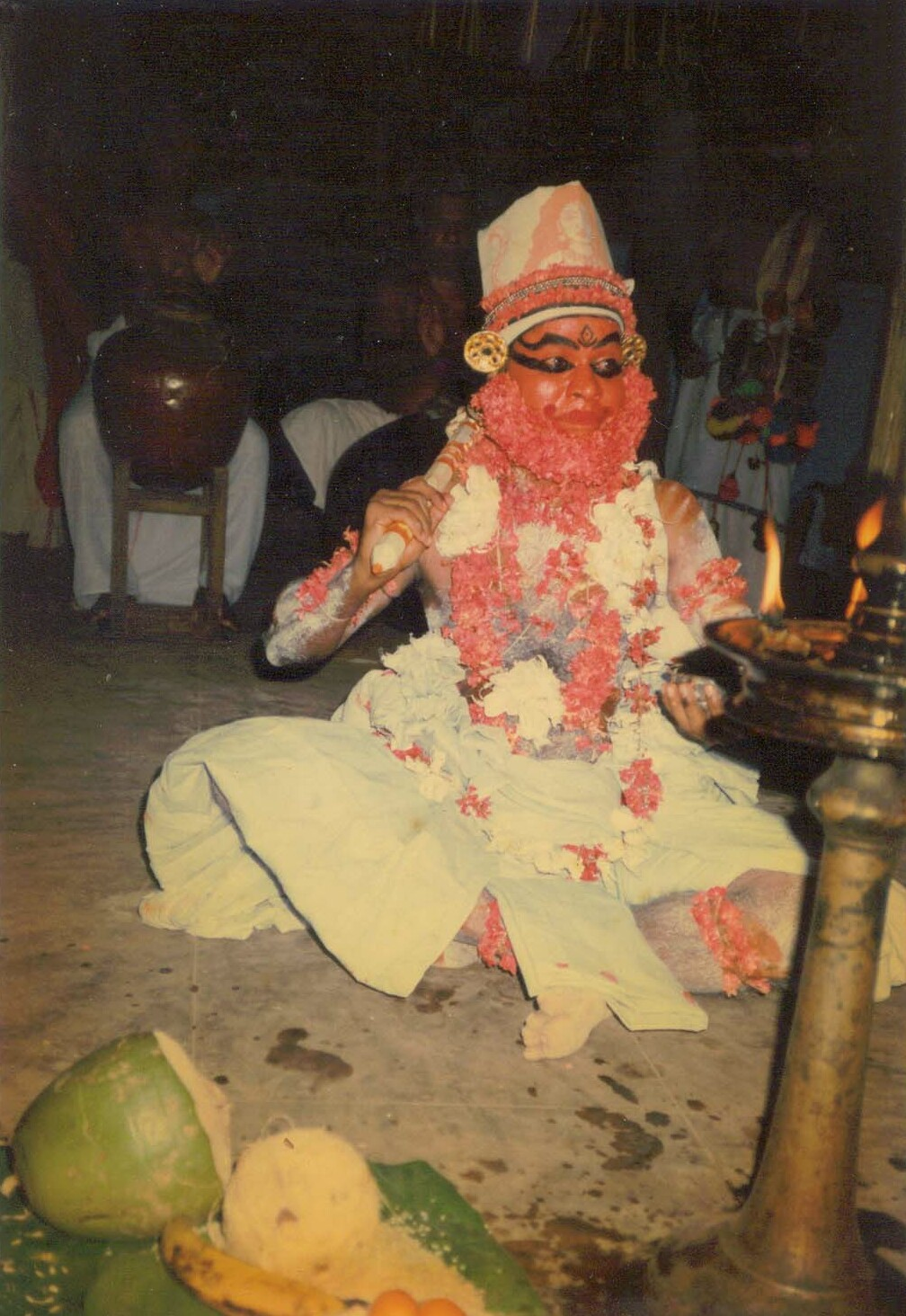
Chakyar dance

== Education ==
Sree Sankara Oriental High School, previously known as Balakollasini Samskritha Pathasala, is the oldest high school in this area, and stays for the education of the poor. It was started by the great Sanskrit scholar and teacher Panditaratnam Pazhedathu Sankaran Nampoothiripad. This is one of the six schools in Kerala where Sanskrit is the Major Language.

There is a sacred temple-pond (Ambalakkulam) near to Sri Killikkurussi Mahadeva Temple, where pilgrims and visitors bathe.

Pin code of the village is 679 301.

== Image gallery ==
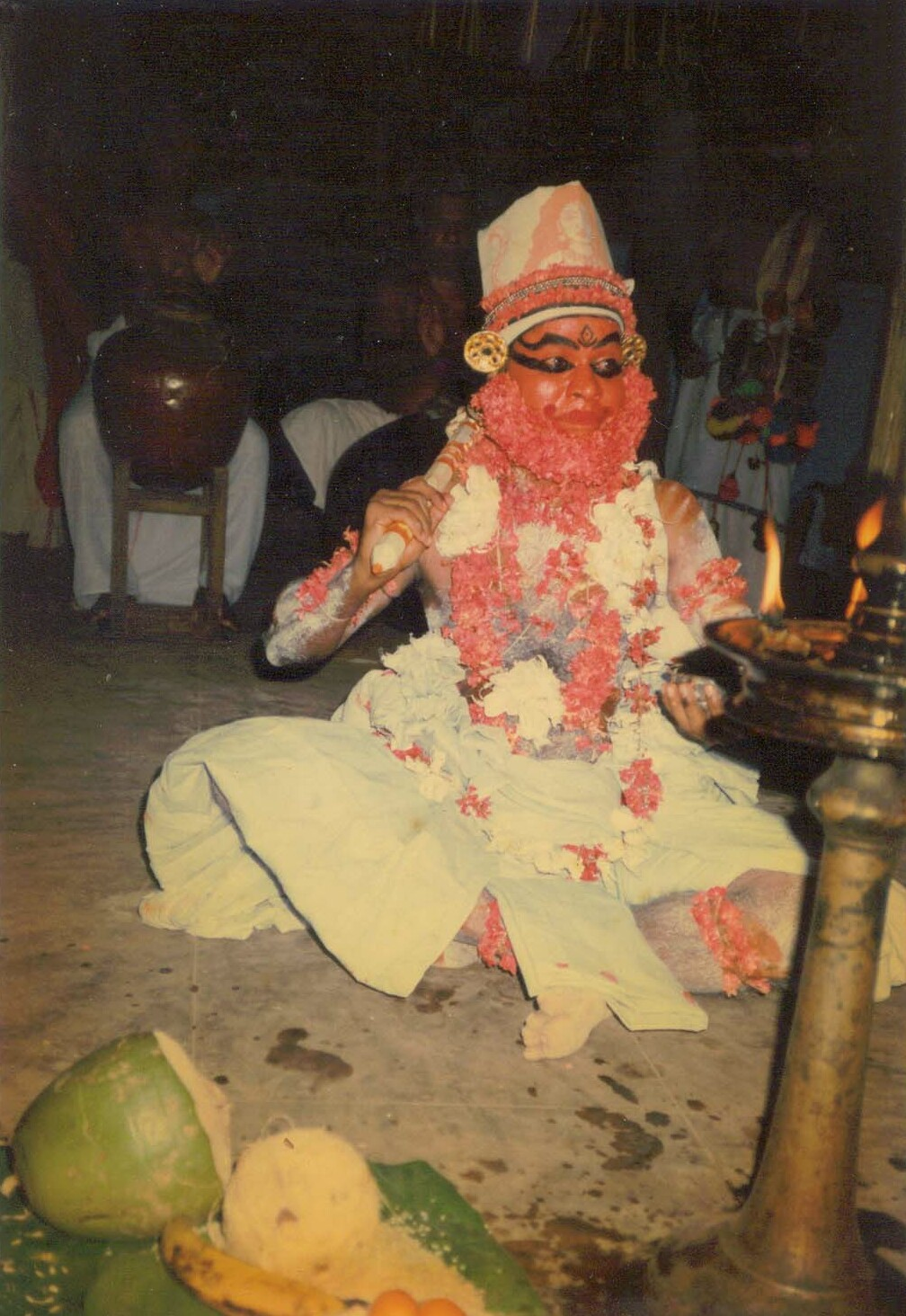
The performance of devotional koothu- Mathavilasam at Killikkurussi Mahadeva Kshetram by Mani Damodara Chakyar.

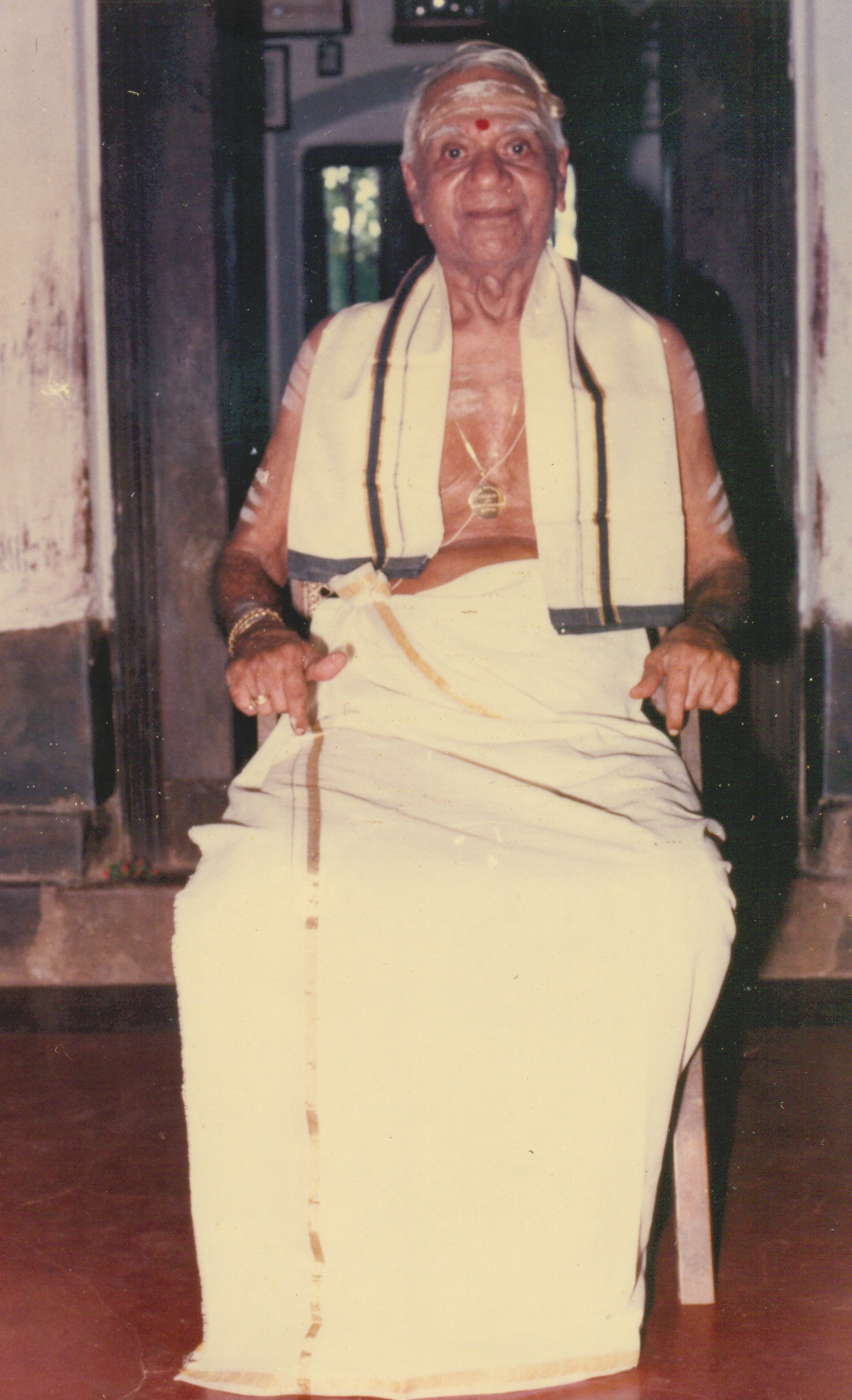
Padma Shri Mani Madhava Chakyar- Legendary Koodiyattam Artist.

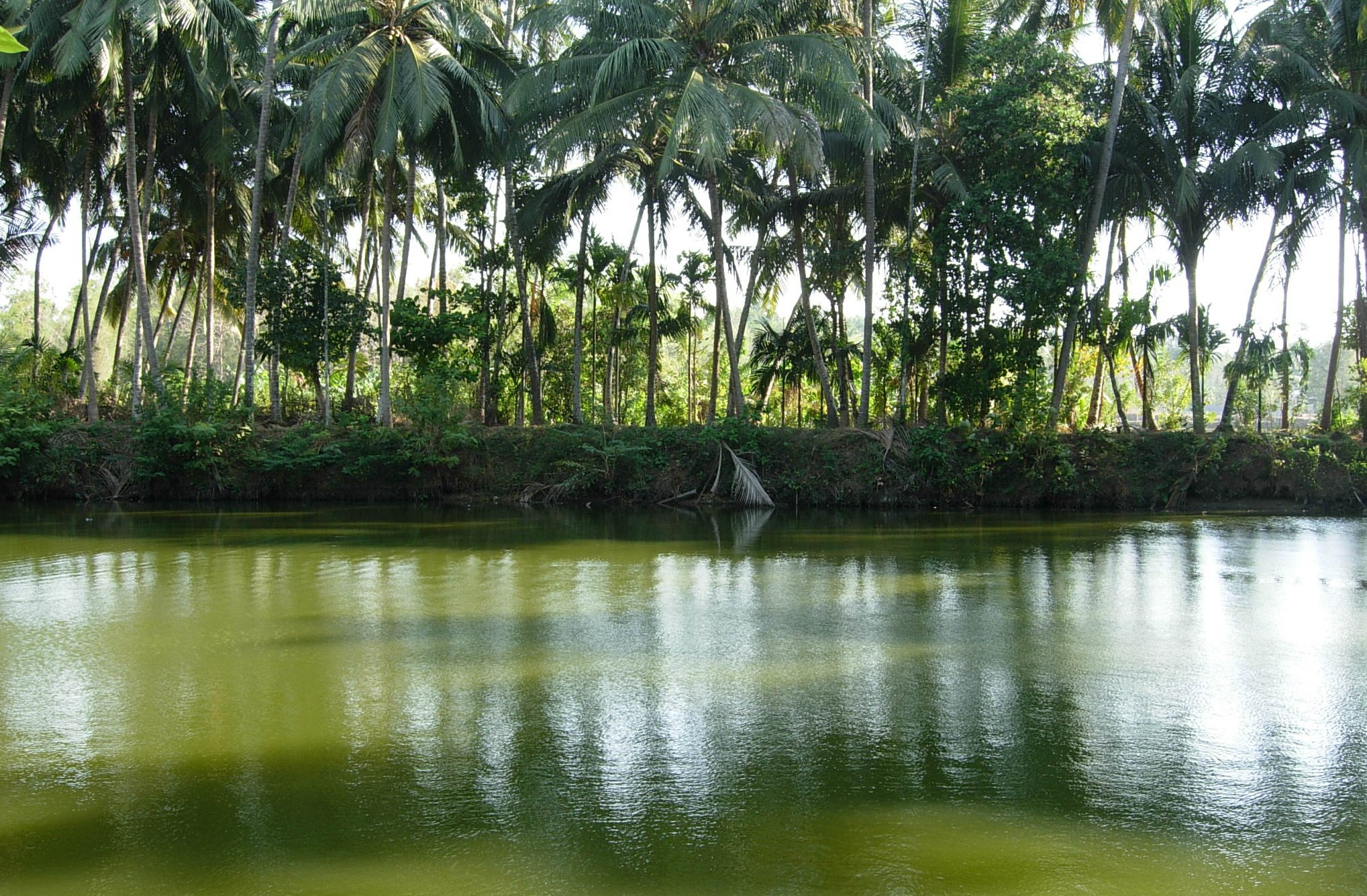
Pond associated with the Killikkurussi Mahadeva temple.

== See also ==
- Mani Madhava Chakyar
- Kunchan Nambiar
- Ottamthullal
- Chakyar koothu
- Koodiyattam
- Kathakali
- Mohiniyattam
- Mani Damodara Chakyar
