= Vana Vishesha Sthalangal =

Vana Vishesha Sthalangal are the Siva temples which are located in famous forest areas. The word Vana means "forest area" and Vishesha means "famous". These temples are located in Tamil Nadu State.

Vana Vishesha Sthalangal listed below:

1. Kadambavanam – Madurai
2. Kundalivanam – Thiruvakkarai
3. Kudhavanam – Thiruvuchchathanam
4. Shanbagavanam – Thirunageswaram
5. Magizhavanam – Thiru needur
6. Midhuvanam – Nannilam
7. Maraivanam – Vedaranyam (Thirumaraikadu)
8. Madhavivanam – Thirumurugan
9. Poondi Vilvavanam – Thiruvadanai
10. Venuvanam – Thirunelveli
