= Thiruvangad Sree Ramaswami Temple =

Thiruvangad Sree Rama Swamy Temple
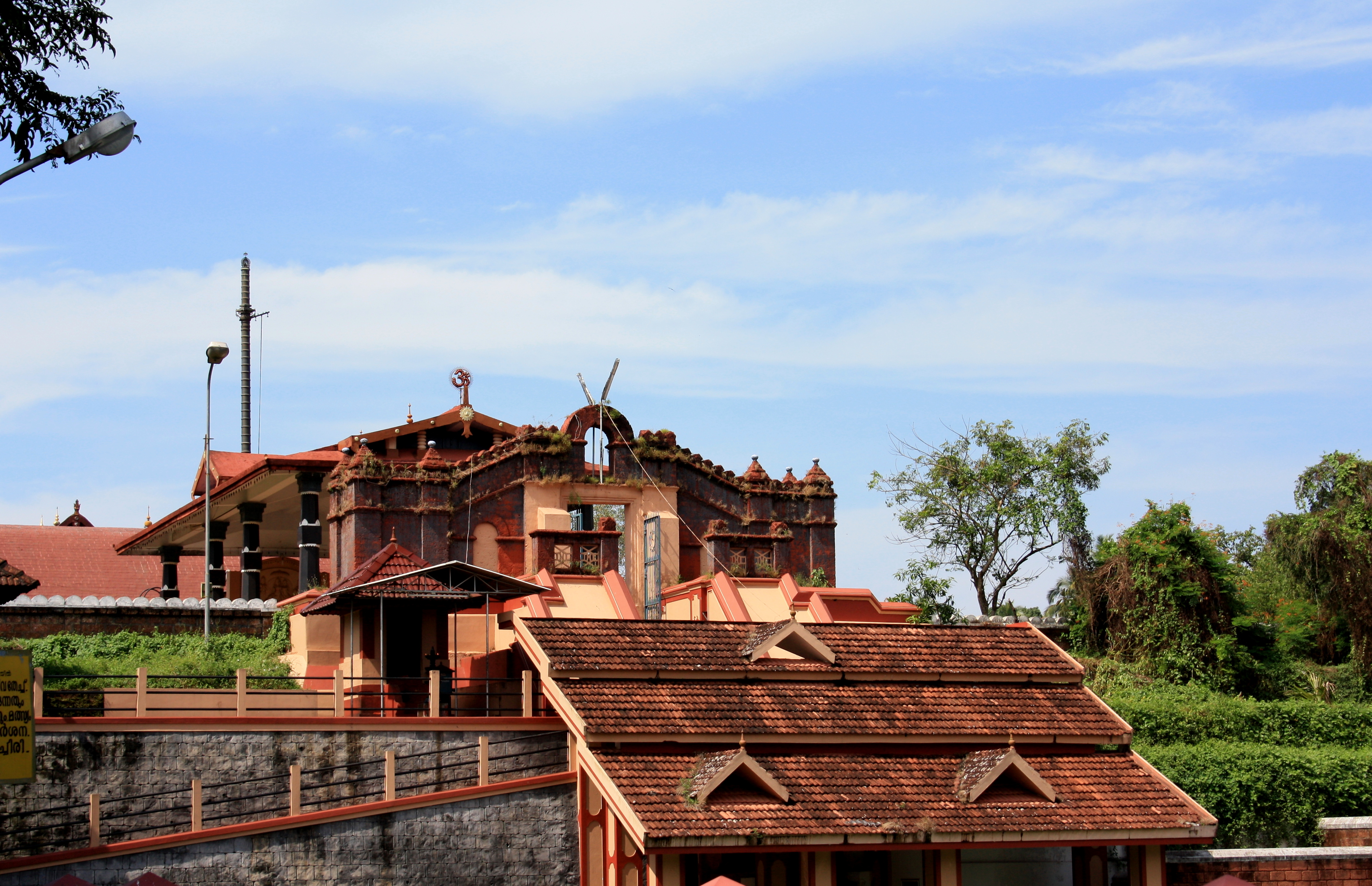
- Front view of Thiruvangad temple, Thalassery

- Location in Kerala

Religion
- Affiliation: Hinduism
- Deity: Sree Rama
- Festivals: Vishu, Rama Navami

Location
- Location: Thalassery
- State: Kerala
- Country: India
- Interactive map of Thiruvangad Sree Rama Swamy Temple
- Coordinates: 11°44′43″N 75°30′12″E

Architecture
- Type: Kerala Temple Architecture
- Direction of façade: East

Thiruvangad Sree Ramaswami Temple (Malayalam: തിരുവങ്ങാട് ശ്രീരാമസ്വാമി ക്ഷേത്രം) is a temple located in the eastern part of Thalassery. The temple is generally known as the Brass Pagoda from the copper sheeting of its roof. A part of the temple was damaged by Tipu Sultan's troops in the 18th century, but the temple is believed to have been saved from destruction. It was one of the outposts of the Thalassery fort in the 18th century. Conferences between the officials of the East India Company and local leaders in its precincts, at which political treaties and agreements were signed. The annual festival of the temple commences on Vishu day in Medam and lasts for seven days.

The temple is one of the five major shrines dedicated to Sree Rama in Kerala. The other four are at Thrinayamkudam (Vaikom), Triprayar, Thiruvilluamala and Kadavallur. It is located on an elevated plot of 2.75 hectares with an adjoining temple tank known as Chira, which extends over a hectare.

== Main festivals ==
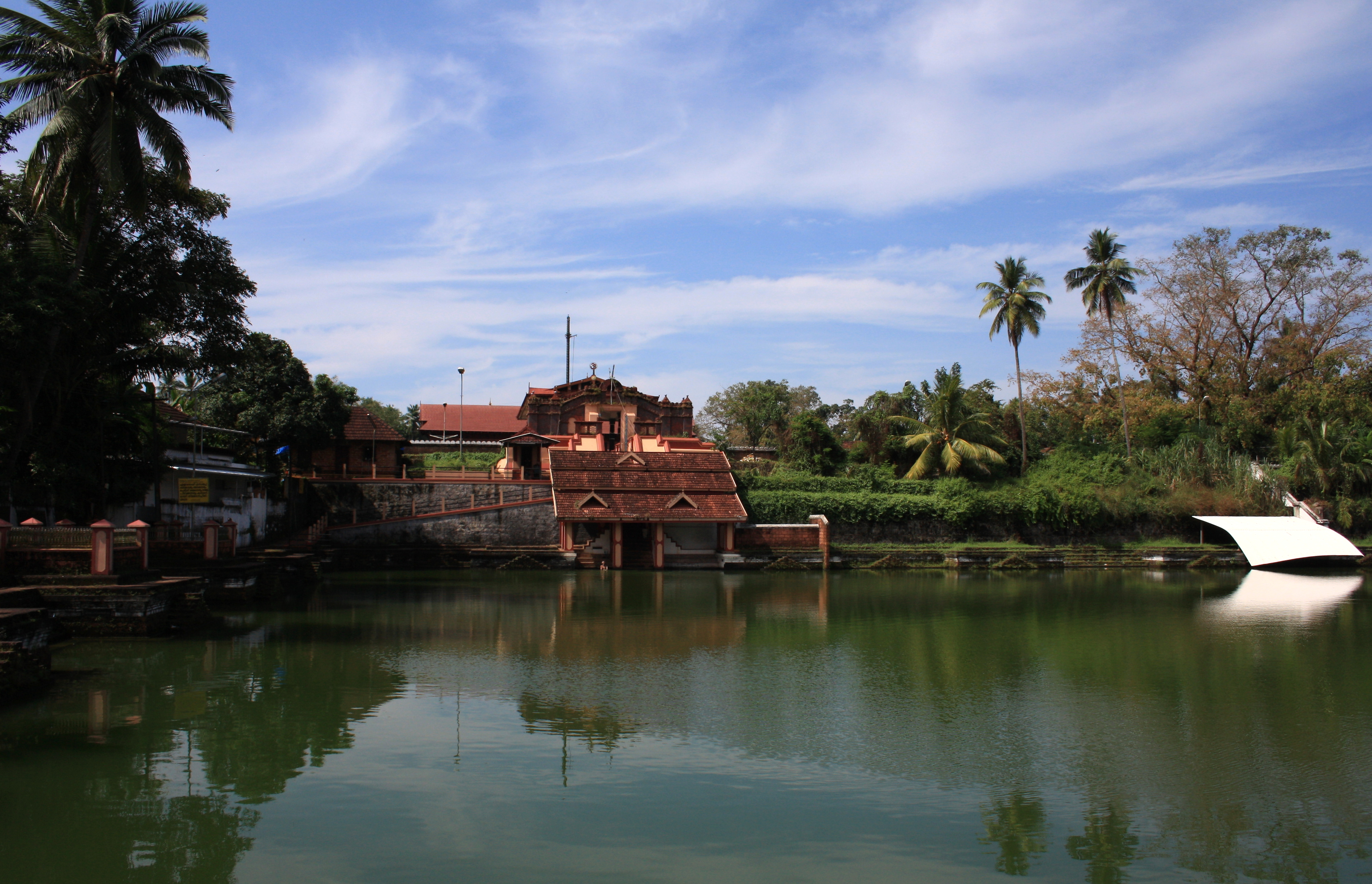
View of the entrance of Thiruvangad temple adjacent to the chira(pond)

Chakyar Koothu is performed in the temple as a part of rituals. Mani Chakyar family traditionally hold the right to perform on temple grounds.

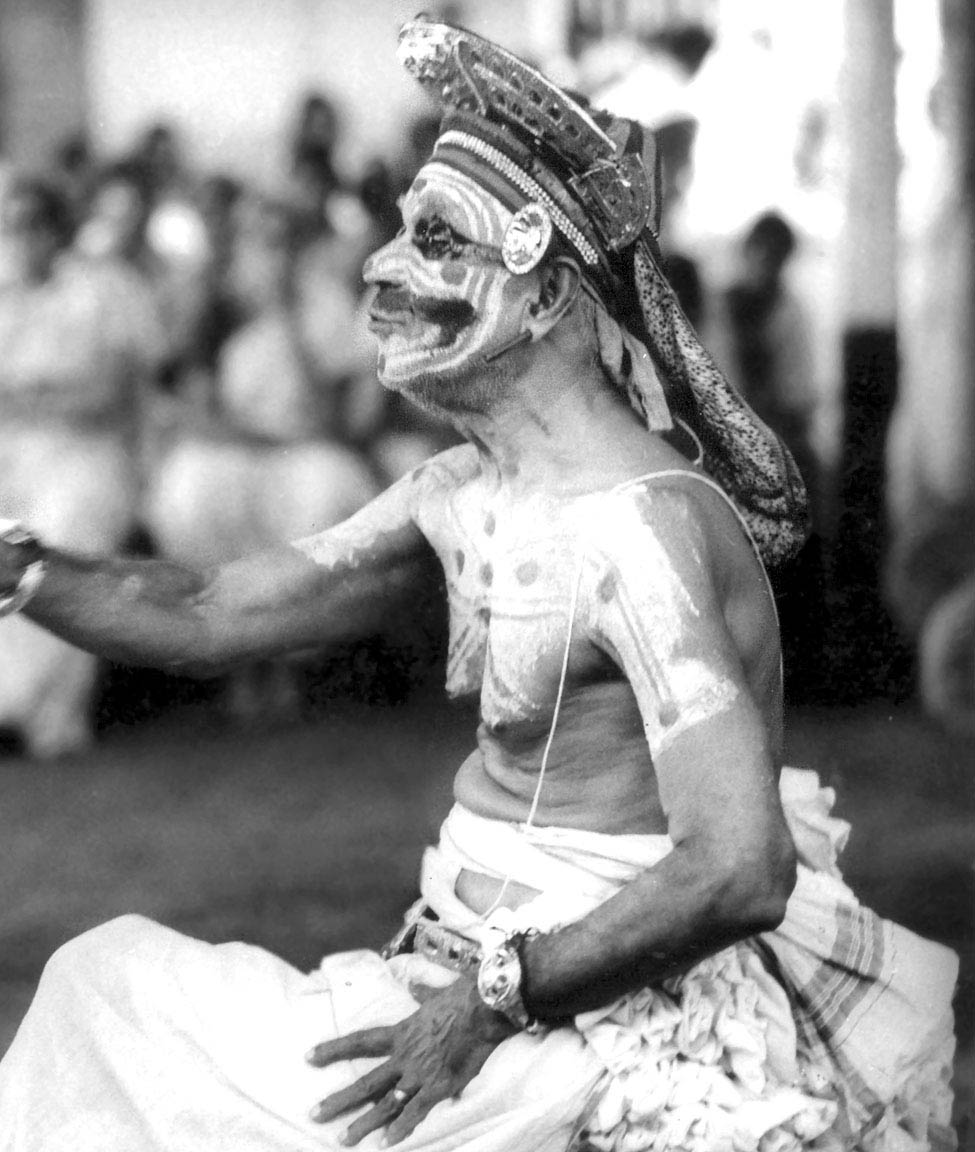
Guru Mani Madhava Chakyar performing Chakyar Koothu

== See also ==
- Hinduism
- Kannur
- Thalassery
- Kerala
- Chakyar Koothu
- Mani Madhava Chakyar
- Mani Damodara Chakyar
- Temples of Kerala
