= Mulampuzha =

Village in Pathanamthitta District, Kerala, India

Mulampuzha is a village of Pandalam, Kerala, India. The Pandalam Mahadeva Temple popularly known as Thazhathampalam' is situated in this village.

This is the birthplace of Kerala State minister M.N. Govindan Nair.

The fine arts organisation Manjima Grandhasala was founded here in 1977.
