= Thottakkonam =

- Village
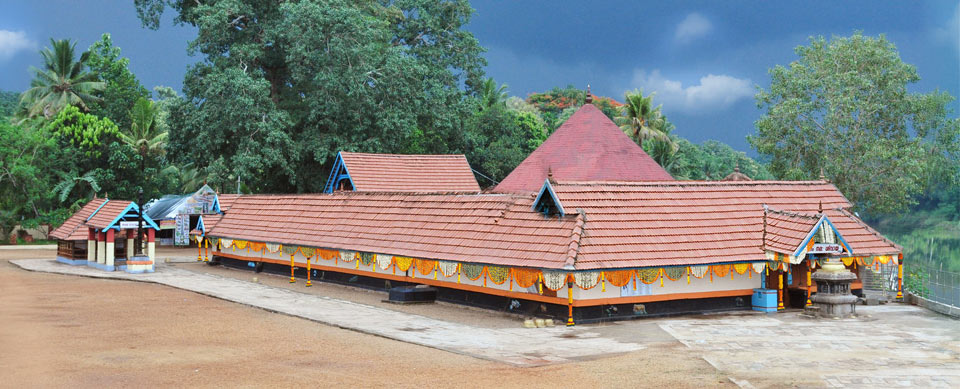
- Pandalam Mahadeva Temple
- Country: India
- State: Kerala
- District: Pathanamthitta

Languages
  - Official: Malayalam, English
- Time zone: UTC+5:30 (IST)
- Vehicle registration: KL-26
- Nearest city: Pandalam
- Lok Sabha constituency: Pathanamthitta
- Vidhan Sabha constituency: Adoor
- Climate: Good (Köppen)

Thottakkonam is a village in Pathanamthitta district, Kerala, India.

== Places of Worship ==
- Pandalam Mahadeva Temple
- Karipoor Bhagavathi Temple

== Education ==
- Govt Higher Secondary School, Thottakkonam
