= Mani Damodara Chakyar =

Indian actor

Māni Dāmodara Chākyār
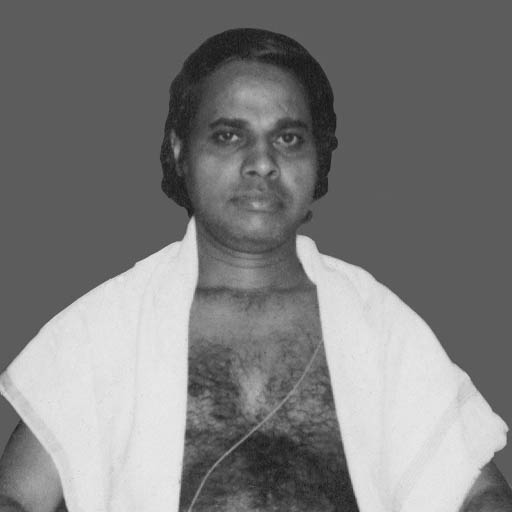
- Guru Māni Dāmodara Chākyār
- Born: Māni Dāmodara Chākyār; 1946 (age 79–80); Kozhikode, Kerala, India
- Years active: 1960-
- Awards: Kerala Sangeetha Nataka Akademi Award: 2001

Mani Damodara Chakyar (Māni Dāmodara Chākyār; born 1946) is a Kutiyattam and Chakyar Koothu artist in Kerala state of south India. He is a nephew and disciple of legendary guru Nātyāchārya Vidūshakaratnam Padma Shri Māni Mādhava Chākyār. He belongs to the great Mani Chakyar tradition of Koodiyattam and Chakyar koothu.

He studied Chakyar Koothu and Koodiyattam in the traditional way for more than 30 years under the direct guidance of Māni Mādhava Chākyār. He has studied Sanskrit and Nātyasāstra in the traditional way. He holds a Master's degree in Sanskrit literature as well. He used to be high school Sanskrit teacher in Kozhikode.

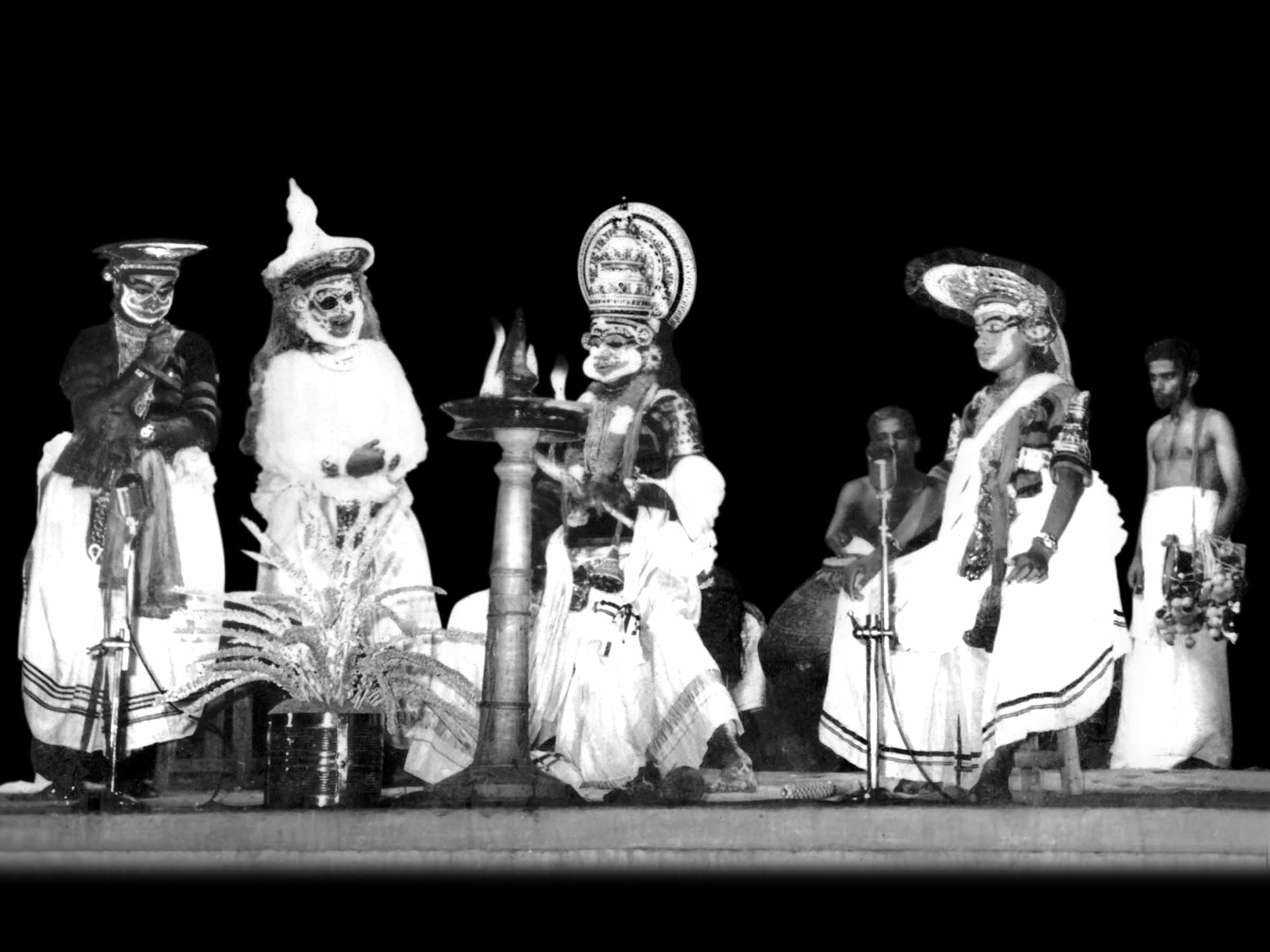
First ever Koodiyattam performance outside Kerala: Madras 1962.

He was a member of legendary guru Padma Shri Māni Mādhava Chākyār's Koodiyattam troupe which performed Koodiyattam outside Kerala for the first time. In that performance of Thoranayudham Koodiyattam (1962, Madras), he played the role of Vibhishana with his guru Mani Madhava Chakyar (as Ravana). He is an exponent of traditional devotional Koothus and Koodiyattams, such as Anguliyanka, Mattavilasa Prahasana, Mantranka, Ezhamanka (seventh act of Ascharyachoodamani).

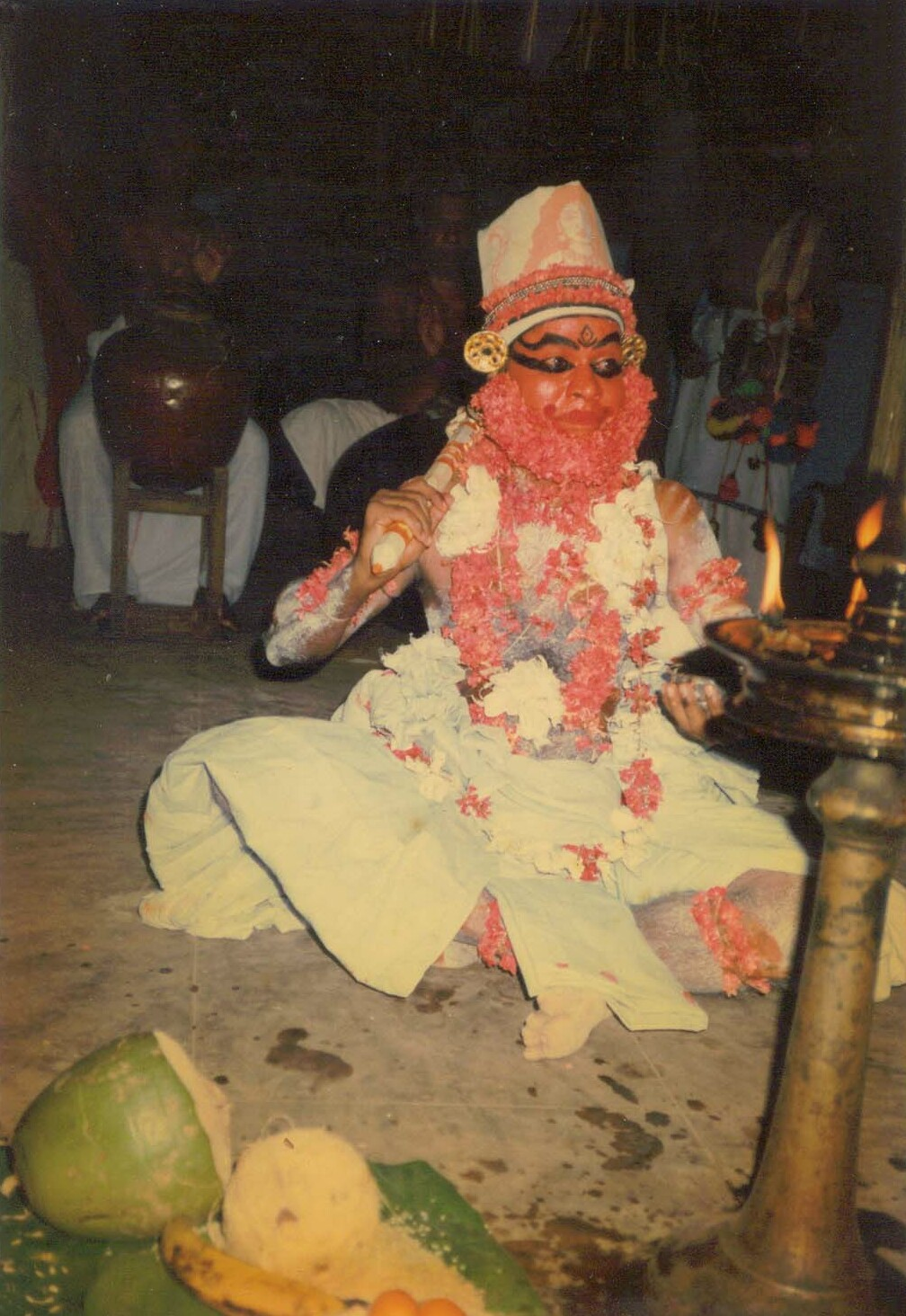
Mani Damodara Chakyar as Kapali in Mattavilasam Kutiyattam

He performs a huge number of Atiyantara koothu of the Mani family (the koothus which are assigned to the family from ancient times) consisting of all these devotional ritualistic koothu and Koodiyattam in famous temples in Kerala for decades. The famous temples include Karivellur Shiva Temple of Kannur district; Matayikkavu Bhagavathi Temple, Taliparamba Rajarajeshwara Temple, Kottiyoor Perumal Temple, Kanjirangad Shiva Temple, Thiruvangad Sree Ramaswami Temple of Thalassery and Cherukunnu Chiraykkal Bhagavathi Temple of Kannur district; Lokanarkavu Temple of Vatakara, Thali (Tali) Siva Temple, Sreethiruvilayanadukavu Bhagavathi Temple and Thiruvachhira Sree Krishna temple of Kozhikode district; Thirunavaya Navamukunda temple, Thrikkandiyur Shiva temple, Methrikkovil Siva temple, Pandamangalam Krishna temple of Kottakkal and Kotakkal Vishwambhara (Shiva) temple of Malappuram district; Panamanna Shankaranarayana temple, Kallekkulagara Emoor Siva temple, Thiruvegappura Siva temple and Killikkurussi Mahadeva Temple of Palakkad district and Triprayar Sri Rama temple and Peruvanam Shiva temple of Cherpu of Thrissur temple.

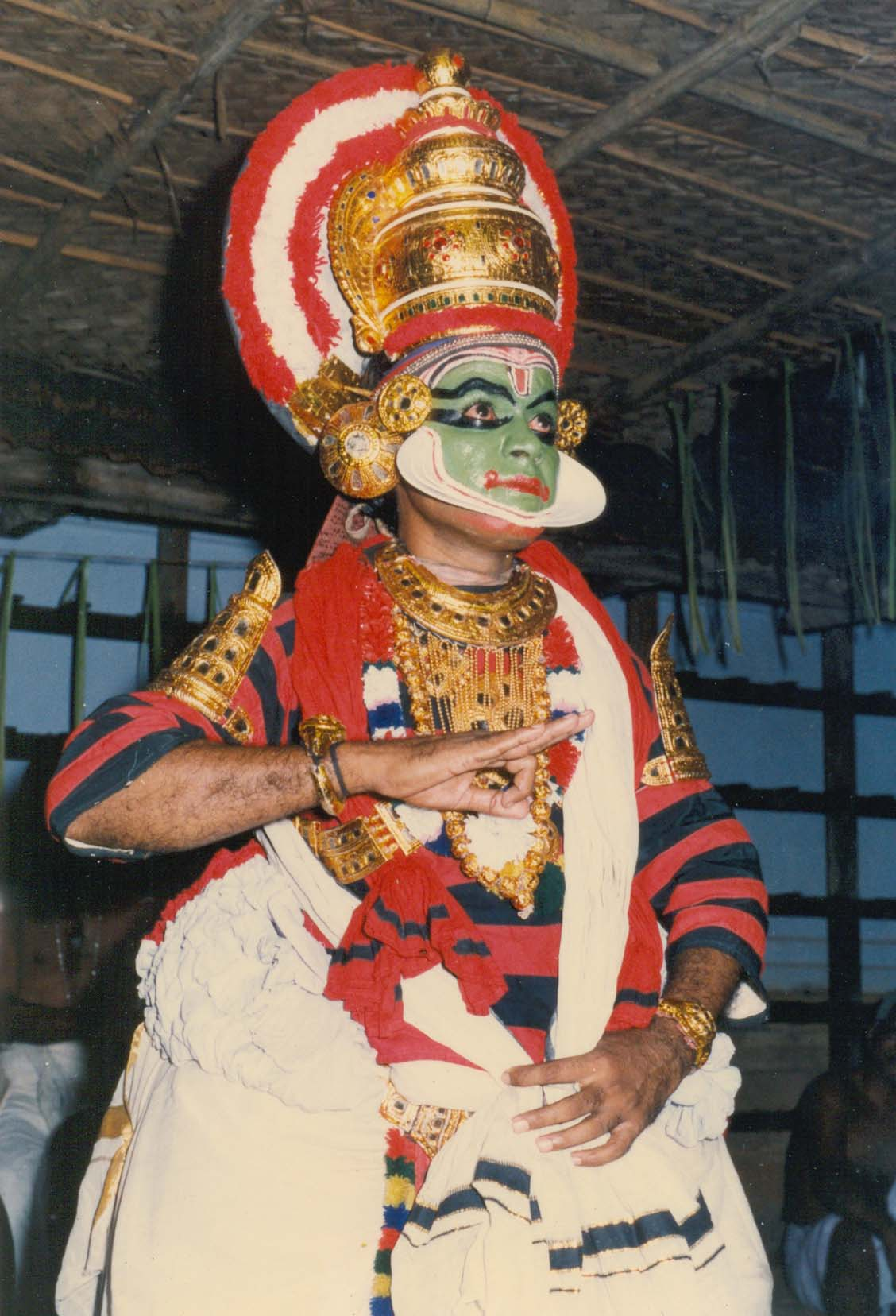
Mani Damodara Chakyar as Nayaka (hero) King Udayana in Swapnavasavadattam Koodiyattam

He was a member of Māni Mādhava Chākyār's troupe that performed Koodiyattams in places outside Kerala such as New Delhi, Banaras, Mumbai, Ujjain, Bhopal and Madras. He had the good fortune to perform in many important conferences and seminars such as World Sanskrit Conferences at Banaras, Bangalore and Thrissur.

He has performed both as Nayaka (hero) and Vidushaka (court jester) in Kudiyattams such as Swapnavasavadattam, Naganandam, Subhadradhananjayam, etc. When Māni Mādhava Chākyār choreographed and directed Kalidasa's Mālavikāgnimitra and Vikramorvaśīya for the first time in the history of Kudiyattam, it was Mani Damodara Chakyar to whom he gave the role of Nayaka. Mani Damodara Chakyar staged Malavikagnimitram and Vikramorvasheeyam at Kalidasa Academy, Ujjain under the guidance of his guru.

He was the first Koodiyattam student who received scholarship from MHRD New Delhi. Later, both junior and senior fellowships were awarded to him by the same department. He is the recipient of many prizes from temples and cultural organisations. Kerala Sangeetha Nataka Akademi honoured him with Kerala Sangeetha Nataka Akademi Award for his contributions to Chakyar Koothu and Koodiyattam (2001). He received the Kerala Kalamandalam V S Sharma endowment award for 2007. In 2017, he was honoured with Kalamandalam Award for Koodiyattam.

== Books ==
- Chakyar, Mani Damodara (2009), Ramayanam Prabandham (Balakandam), Mani Damodara Chakyar, Lakkidi

== See also ==
- Māni Mādhava Chākyār
- Chakyar Koothu
- Koodiyattam
- Kathakali
- Mohiniyattam
- Thulall
- Killikkurussimangalam

== Sources ==
- Bhargavinilayam, Das (1991), Mani Madhaveeyam (biography of Mani Madhava Chakyar), Department of Cultural Affairs, Government of Kerala, ISBN 81-86365-78-8
- Sruti, August 1990 issue (71)
