= Thalassery Pier =

Coordinates: 11.745111°N 75.489091°E

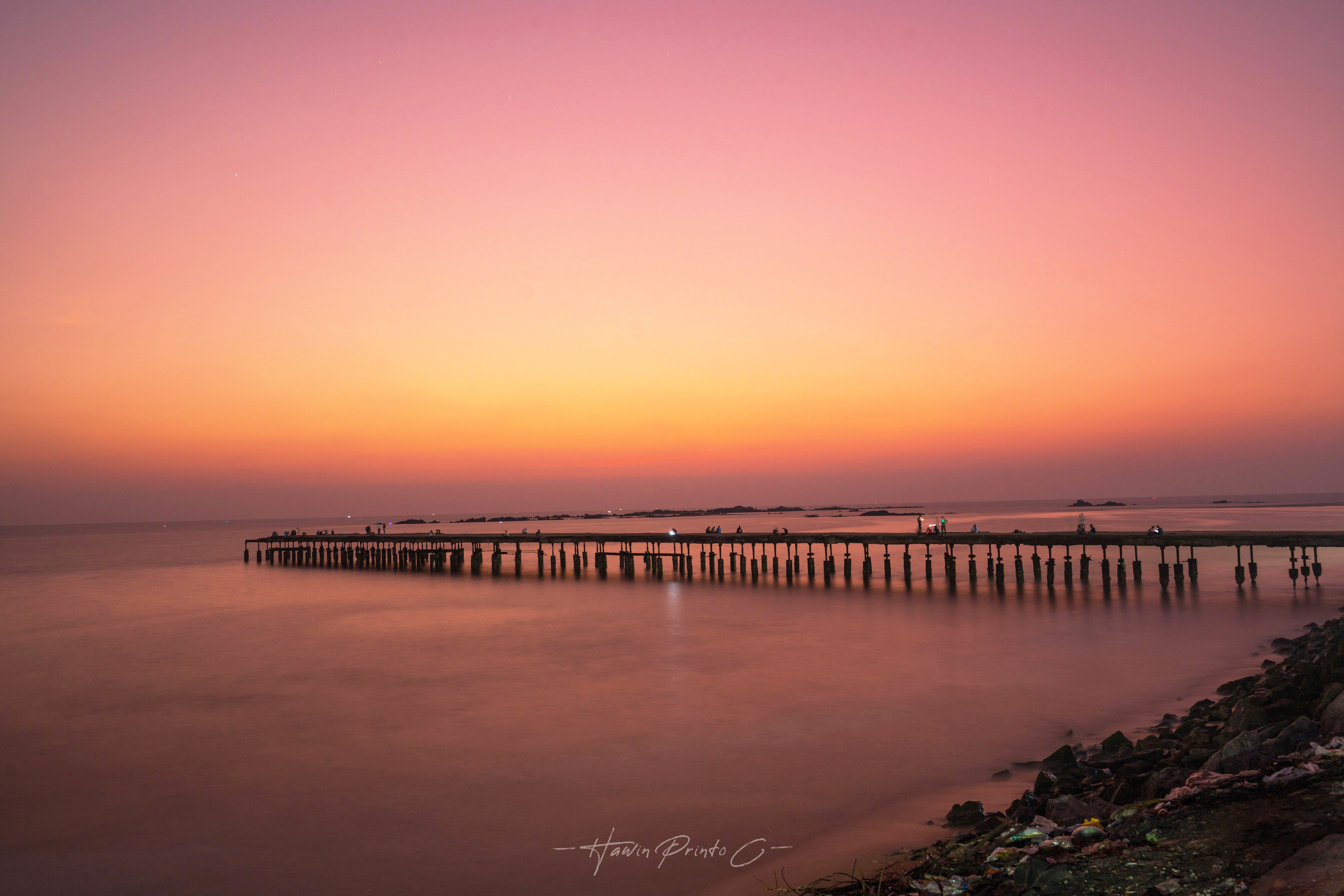
Thalassery Pier

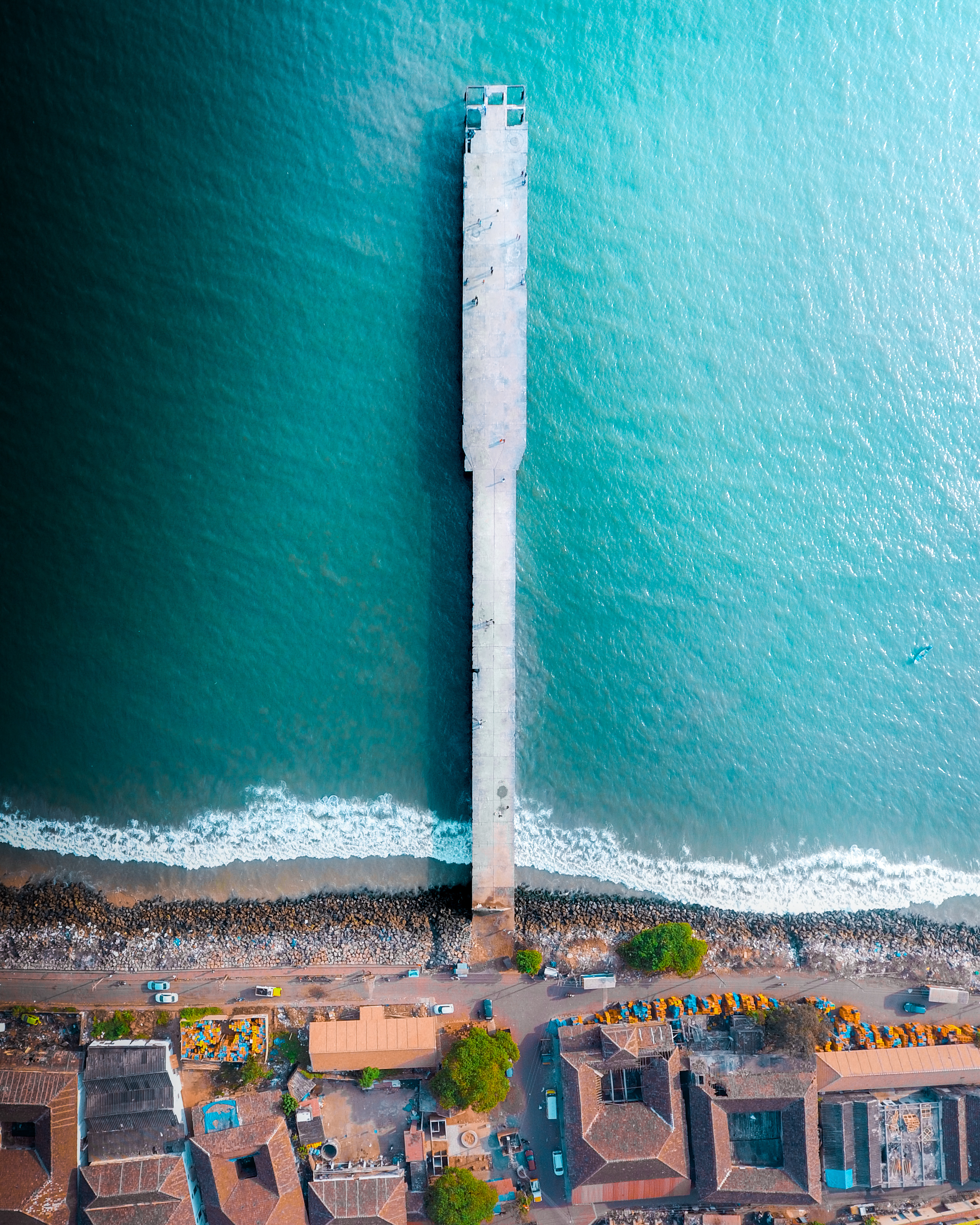
Aerial view of Thalassery Pier

Thalassery Pier, locally known as Kadalpalam, is located in Thalassery, Kannur District of Kerala state, South India.

It is an old pier extending out into the Arabian Sea. It is frequented by people taking evening walks. This "Kadalpalam" was used as a commercial access through the sea, to and from the Tellicherry Bazar, during the European rule. The condition of the pier is deteriorating, so entry is officially blocked with a wall for safety reasons.

In 1910, the East India Company constructed the pier, extending into the Arabian Sea for transporting commodities to and from ships. The large rocks on the shore and shallow waters often led to shipwrecks and hence the pier was constructed, with huge cranes placed at its end and rail tracks on either side for easy transport of goods from the godowns situated at the shore.

A busy commercial centre then, Thalassery witnessed brisk development with its export of spices, coffee, fish, wood, and pepper, attracting people from all over.

The town became an administrative centre of operations and the judicial headquarters while the port stood a mute observer to the glory of the town and its development. It was the advent of the Mangalore port which reduced its significance principally, while many more aspects contributed to its slow degeneration. The ships disappeared, and gradually the cranes and the trolley tracks.

Many Malayalam movies are shot here including the famous shot in Thattathin Marayathu and Thallumaala.

Recently, the wide walkway around the Thalassery Pier was completely renovated and there has been a significant increase in the number of shops. There are also a wide range of graffiti around the area by local artists and, some of the developments were made during the shooting of the movie Thallumaala.

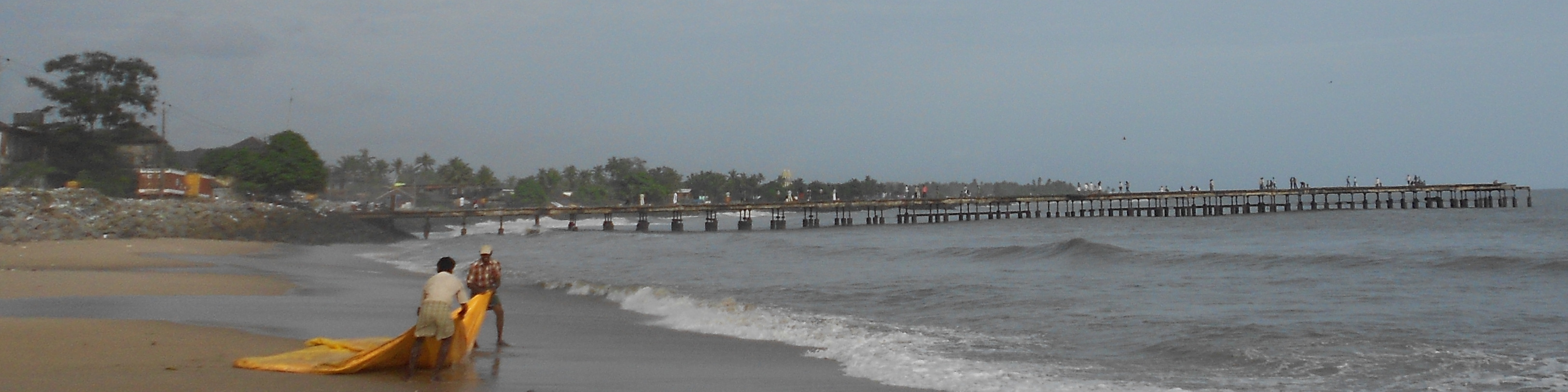
Panoramic view of Thalassery Pier

== See also ==
- Thalassery
- Thalassery Fort
- Overbury's folly
- Thalassery Stadium
