= Pandalam Mahadeva Temple =

- പന്തളം മഹാദേവ ക്ഷേത്രം
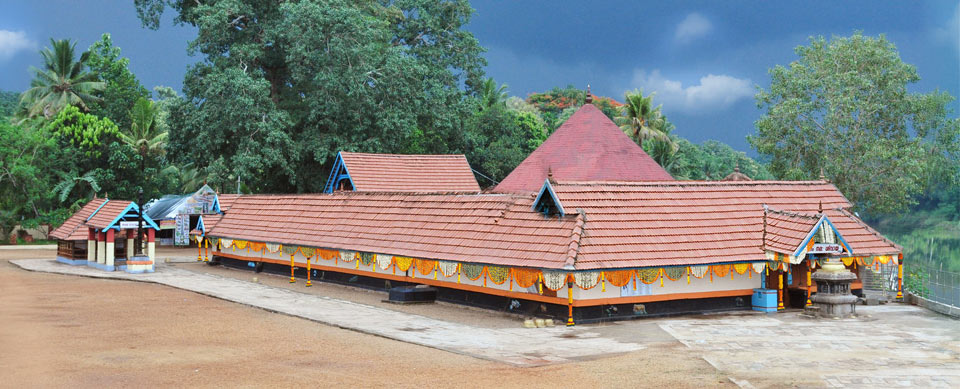

- Mahadeva Temple, Pandalam, Pathanamthitta, Kerala

Religion
- Affiliation: Hinduism
- District: Pathanamthitta
- Deity: Shiva
- Festival: Maha Shivaratri

Location
- Location: Pandalam
- State: Kerala
- Country: India
- Interactive map of Pandalam Mahadeva Temple
- Coordinates: 9°14′15.2″N 76°39′47.7″E

Architecture
- Type: Traditional Kerala style

Specifications
- Temple: One
- Elevation: 37.41 m (123 ft)

Website
- pandalammahadevar.com

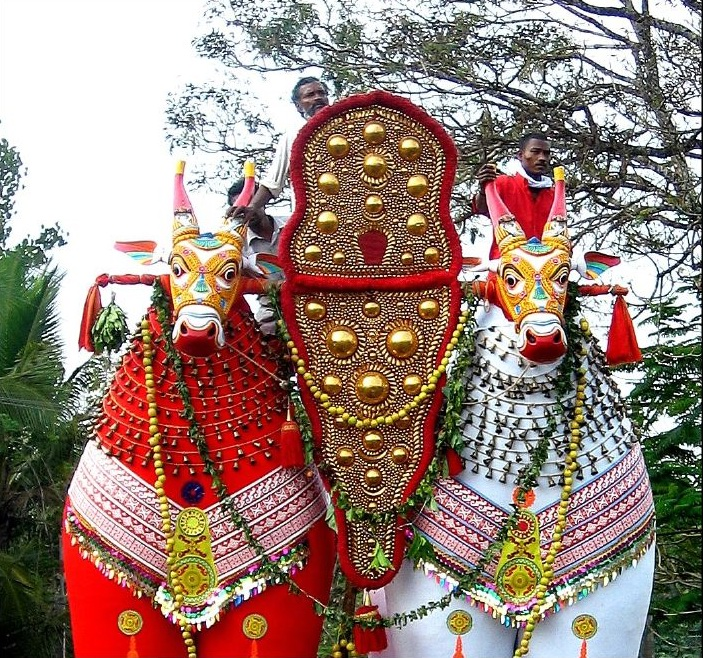
Kettukazhcha at Pandalam Mahadeva Temple

Pandalam Mahadeva Temple is situated in between Thottakkonam and Mulampuzha villages of Pandalam in Kerala, India, on the bank of Achankovil river. The main deity of the temple is Lord Shiva, who is considered to be in a pleasant mood with his consort Parvati on his lap.

Yearly Kettukazhcha festival is one of the attractions for tourists. 10 days major festival is celebrated in 'Dhanu masa' (November–December) every year. The festival starts by hoisting traditional flag names 'kodiettu' and ends by 'aarattu'. The administration of this temple held by Mahadeva Seva Samithi participated by 12 villages '12 karakal' in Pandalam.

It is believed that Lord Parasuram has installed the main idol of the Garbhagriha in this temple.

Pandalam Mahadeva Temple is one of the oldest temples out of the 108 Shiva temples consecrated by the great 'Sanayasin Khara Muni'. The sacred and world-famous temple is located on the left banks of the Achenkovil river; one side of this temple is in the banks of Achankovil river so this temple is also known as 'Mukkal Vattom'

3 km away from Pandalam town in Kerala State. Pandalam is also world-famous as the home town of Lord Ayyappan.

The temple is unique with its natural procession route around the Sanctorum. The river flows touch the feet of Mahadeva Sanctorum, just like the Ganges flows from Shiva's 'Jada' (hair). The temple is also known as Mukkal Vattam, since the north-eastern side of the temple is taken by the river.

In addition to Lord Shiva, the idols of Lord Ganesh (Ganapathy), 'Maya- Ekshi Amma', Lord Ayyappa, Nagaraja (Lord Snake), Lord Subramanian, Brahma Rakshas and Rakshas are also worshipped here. In effect the temple acts as the symbol and replica of 'KAILASAM'.
