= Overbury's Folly =

Seaside park in Kerala, India

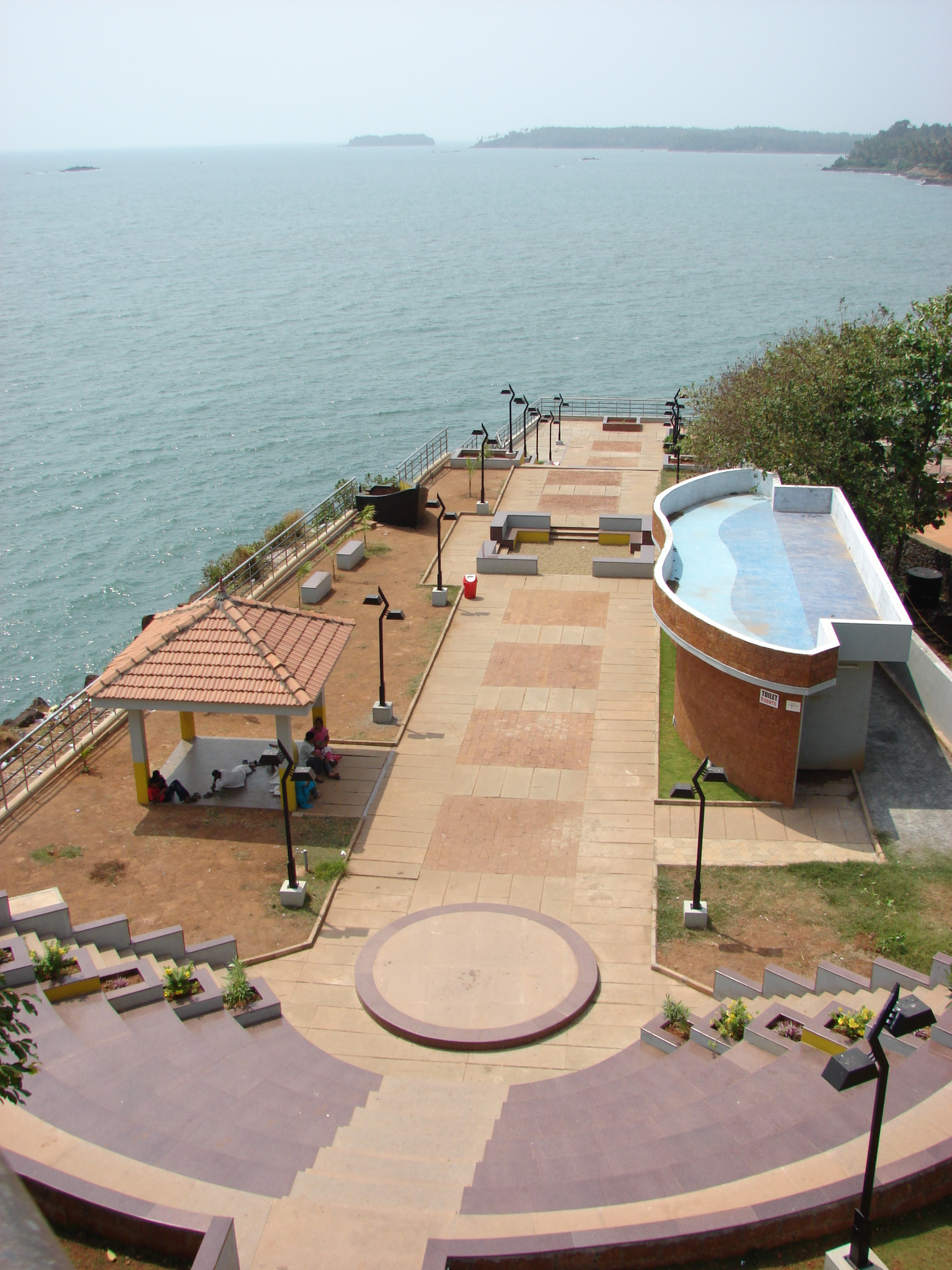
Overbury's Folly

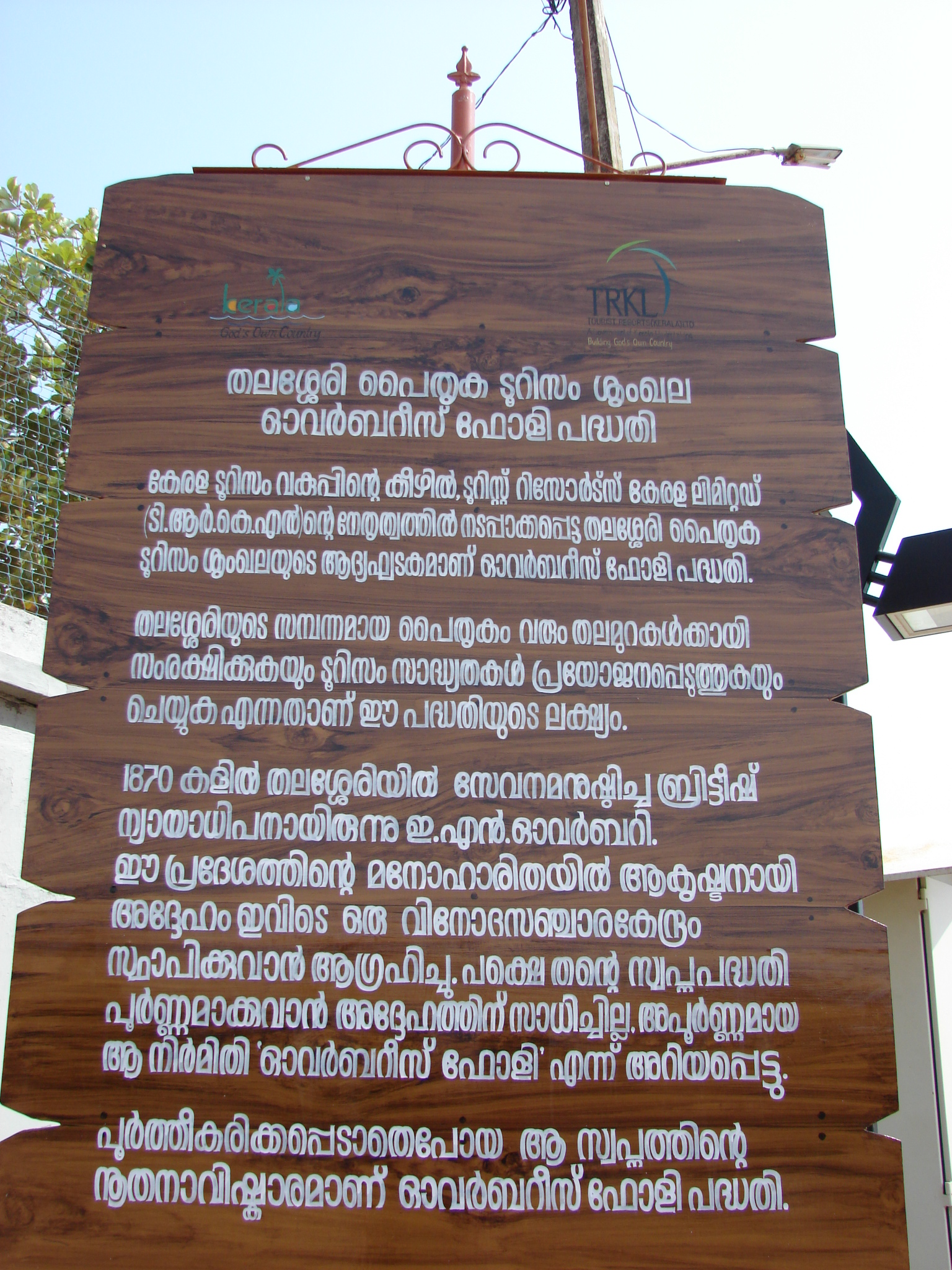
Overbury's Folly

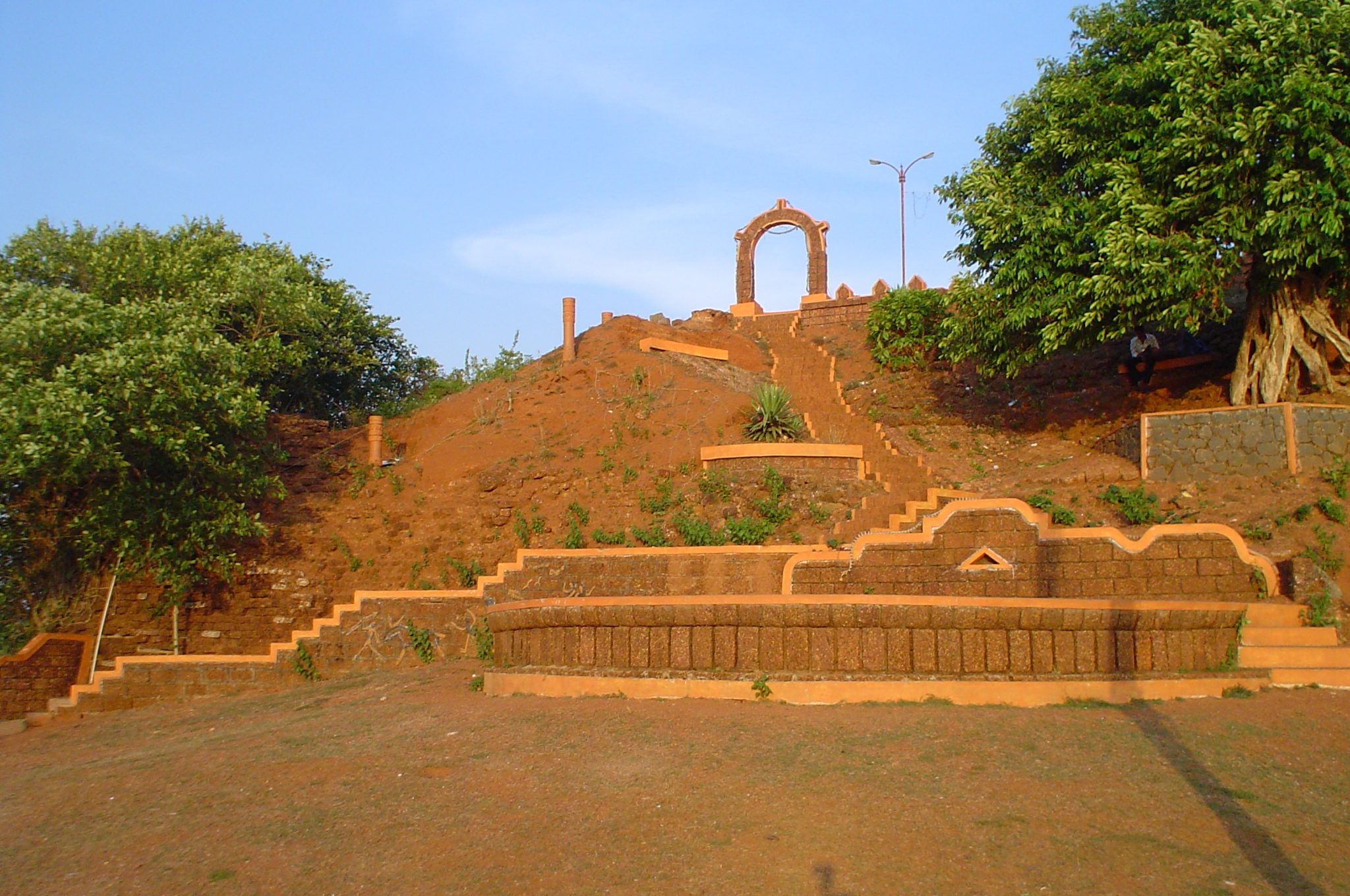
Overbury's Folly

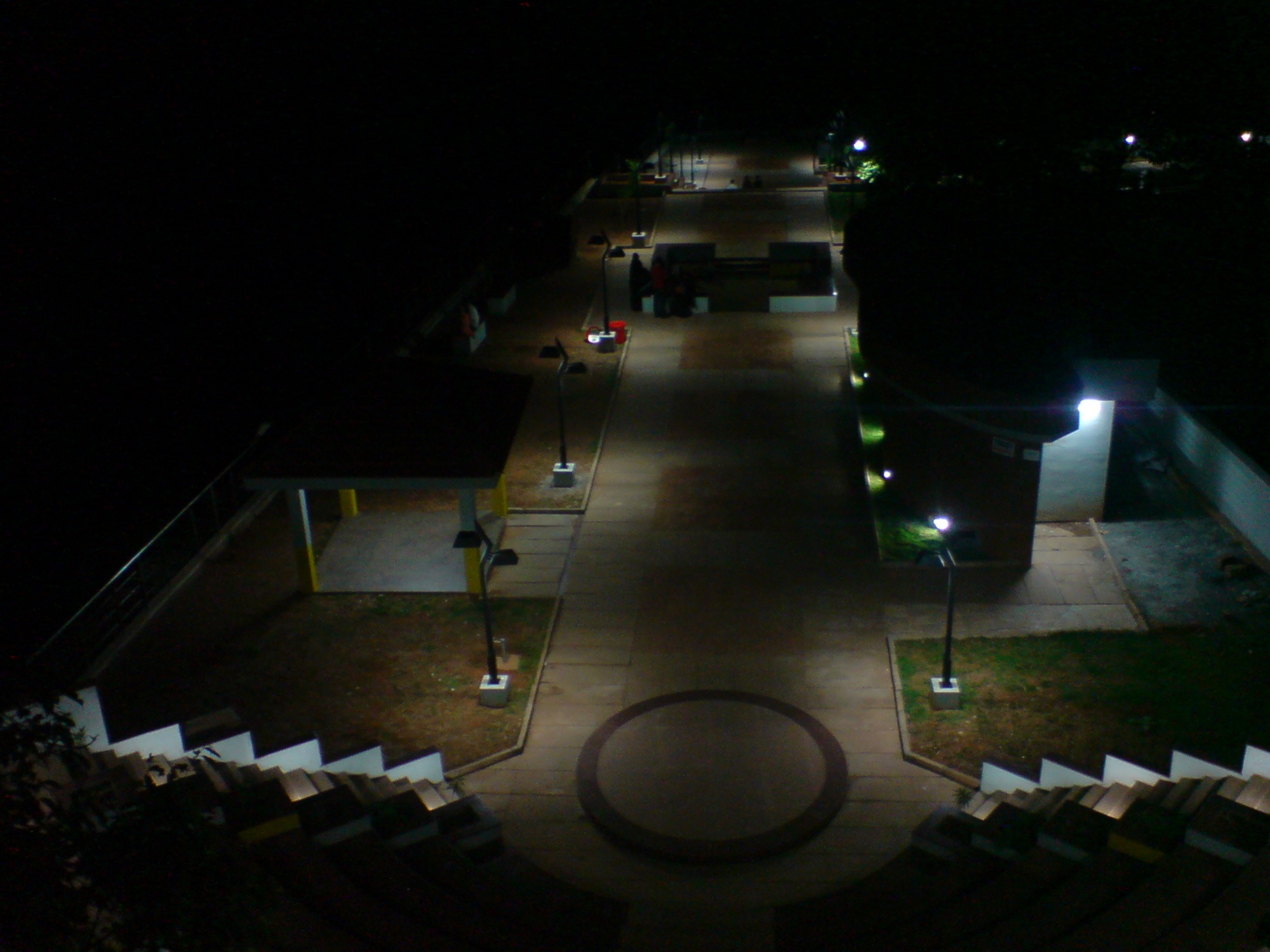
Night view

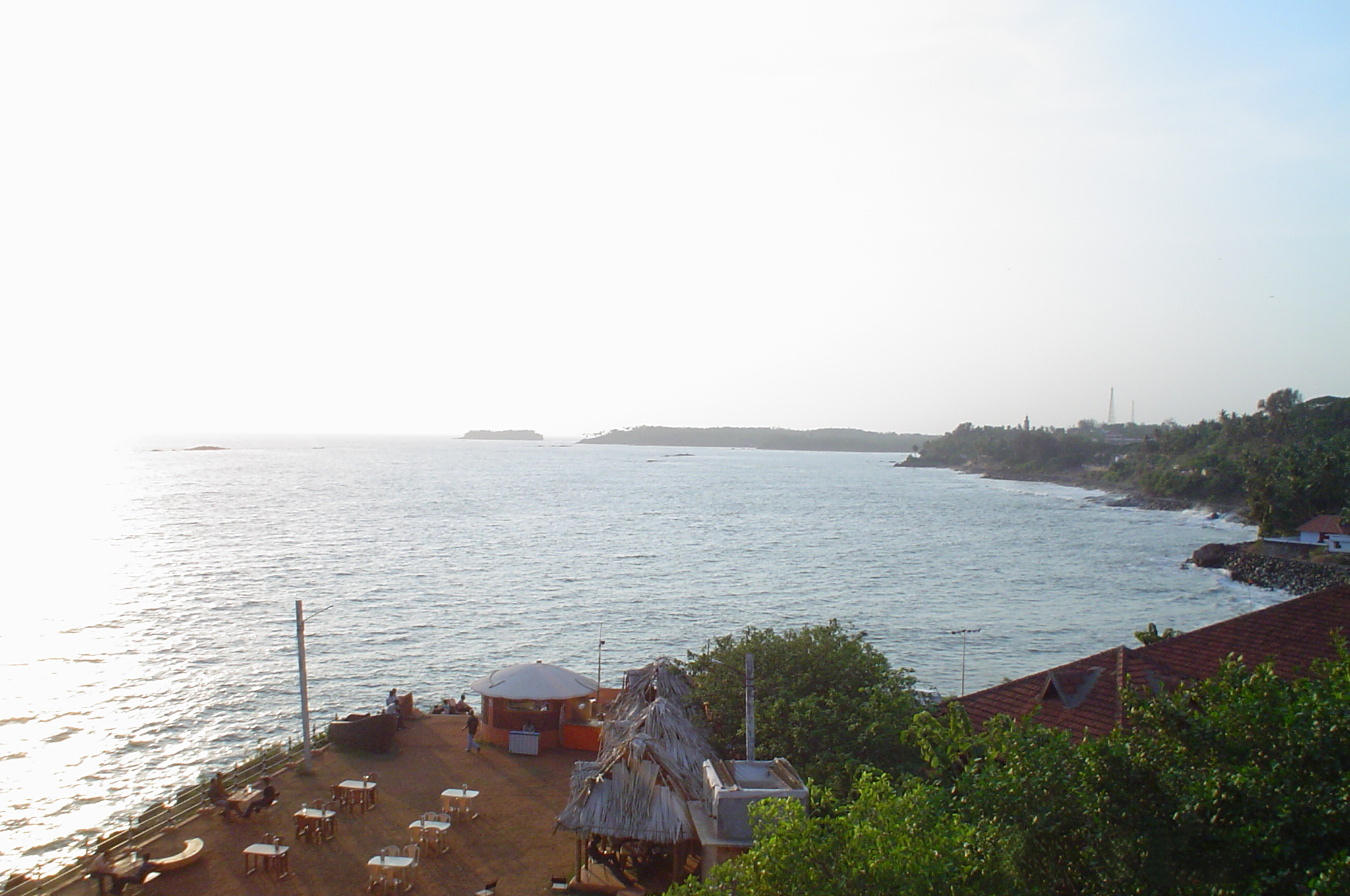
View of Arabian Sea - Overbury's Folly

Overbury's Folly is a seaside park with a watch tower. It is located less than a kilometer from Thalassery, a commercial town on the Malabar Coast in the Kannur district, Kerala, India. It is named after its builder, E.N. Overbury, who served as a local judge at Thalassery in the 1870s.

In 1879, Overbury wanted to construct a picnic area at the cliff. He couldn't complete it, but the spot later earned the name "Overbury's Folly". It commands sweeping views of the Arabian Sea.

Today, Overbury's Folly has been renovated and redecorated as a tourist attraction. It is frequented by local people in the evenings as a place to relax and watch the sun set. A seaside open-air coffee shop has also been opened there.

== See also ==
- Thalassery Fort
- Thalassery Pier
- Thalassery Stadium
