= Siva temple =

Hindu temple

Siva temple or Shiva temple is a Hindu temple dedicated to Lord Shiva.

== Forms ==
The following are some of the forms of Shiva appearing mainly in temples:

- Natarajar in Nataraja Temple, Chidambaram
- Ekambareswarar in Ekambareswarar Temple (Kanchipuram)
- Arunachaleswarar in Arunachalesvara Temple
- Jambukeswarar in Jambukeswarar Temple, Thiruvanaikaval
- Kalahasteeswara in Srikalahasteeswara temple
- Viswanathar in Kashi Vishwanath Temple
- Mahadevar in Pandalam Mahadeva Temple.
