= Tellicherry Fort =

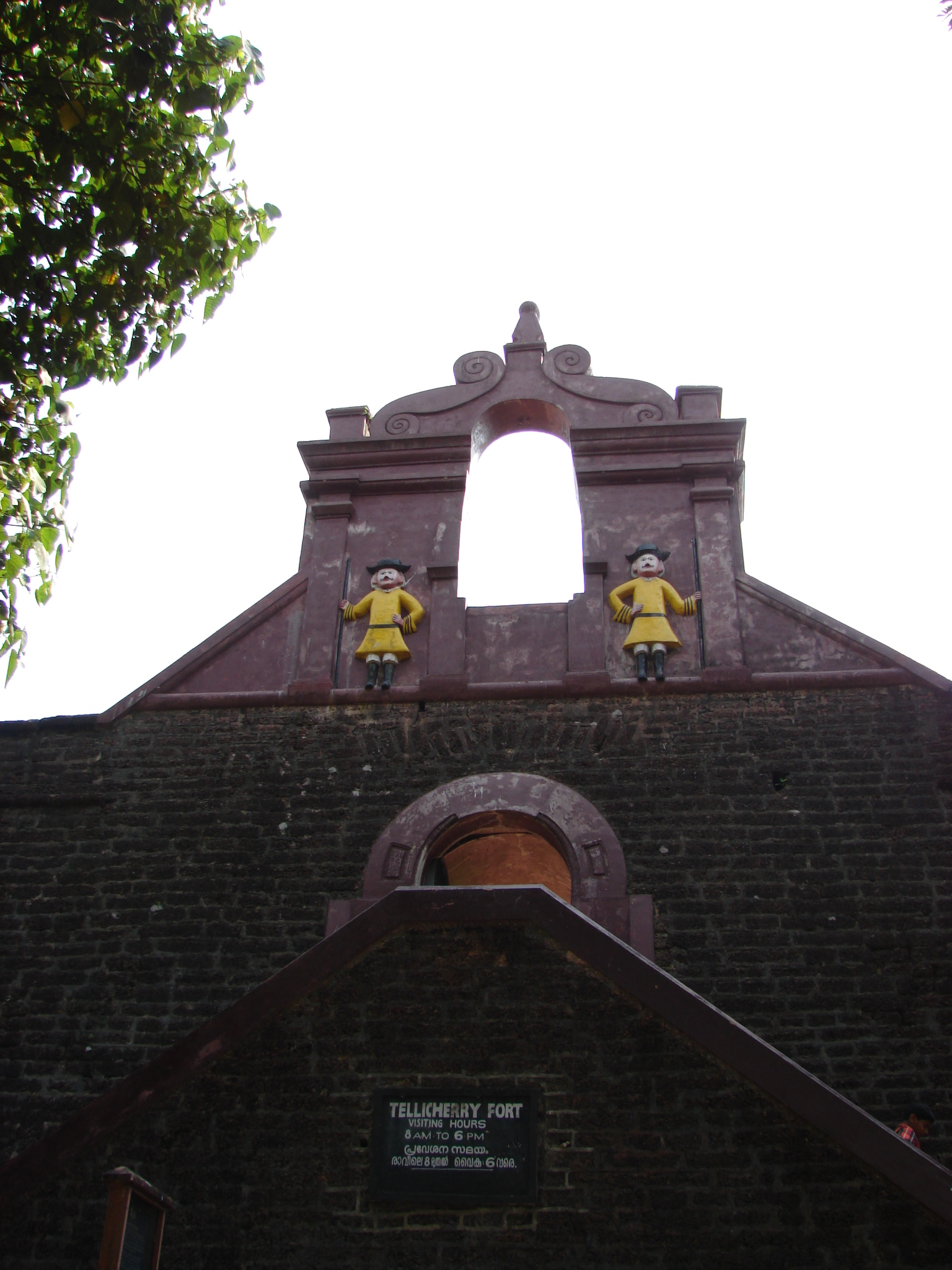

- Location in Kerala, India
- 11.748292°N 75.486134°E
- Location: Thalassery taluk, Kerala, India

Tellicherry Fort is a fortress located in Thalassery (Tellicherry), a town in North Malabar region of Kerala state, India. Thalassery was one of the most important European trading centers in Kerala. The Fort lies on a group of low wooden hills running down to the sea and is protected by natural waters. It has been the main outlet for the rich spices, hill products, and timber of the vast hinterland.

The French were the first to engage in trading at Tellicherry, establishing a stronghold at Mahé, Puducherry, 5 km south of Tellicherry town. Toward the end of the 17th century, the British opened a factory north of Tellicherry. Later, they obtained a site from Vadakkelamkur, the de facto ruler of Kolathunad, and established a factory at Tellicherry in 1708. However, the Udayamangalam branch of the Kolathiri family and Korangoth Nair, the local chieftain, resented this action and launched an attack, causing serious damage to English property. In order to safeguard their trade activities, with the support of the Kolathiri Raja, they built a fort around the outlying hills of Tellicherry. The French occupation of Mahé in 1725 compelled the British Company to strengthen the fortification to establish a stronghold on the Malabar Coast. In 1736, the British took possession of Dharmadam Island. They maintained a strong military establishment at Tellicherry from 1776 to 1784.

In 1781, Hyder Ali, ruler of the Kingdom of Mysore, unsuccessfully attempted to capture the Fort during his campaign to control Malabar. His successor, Tipu Sultan, was forced to cede the Malabar District to the British in 1792, at the conclusion of the Third Anglo-Maratha War.

The Tellicherry fort, overlooking the sea, rises to a height of 10m and is oblong in plan. It was built out of laterite blocks with high round-holed walls and strong flanking bastions. Although the small redoubts on most of the outlying hills have long since disappeared, the Tellicherry fort is in a fair state of preservation. The square fort, with its massive walls, strong flanking bastions, secret tunnels to the sea, and intricately carved huge doors, is an imposing structure. A lighthouse marks the site of an old redoubt. The fort was once the nucleus of Thalassery's development. Tellicherry was also famous for the cricket matches played between Europeans and local teams near the seashore, which used to attract enormous crowds during those days. This is a centrally protected monument under the control of the Archaeological Survey of India since 1921.

== See also ==
- Mysore invasion of Kerala
- Overbury's folly
- Thalassery Pier (Kadalpalam)
- Payyambalam Beach
- Meenkunnu Beach
- Parassinikkadavu Snake Park
- Muthappan temple
- Kannur
- Sacred Heart Girls High School
- Kannur Fort – (St. Angelo Fort)

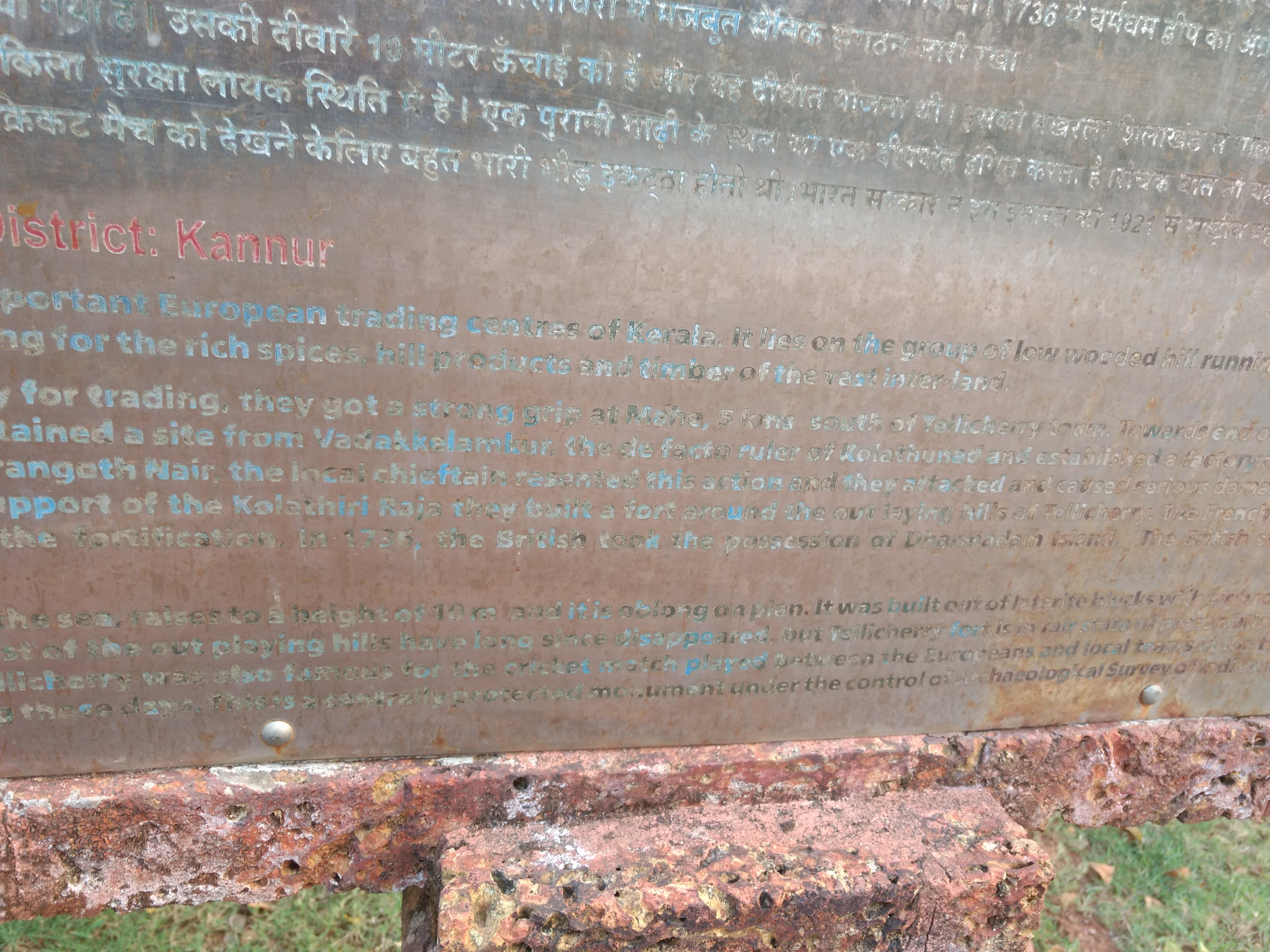
