= Tallapaka =

Tallapaka may refer to:

- Tallapaka, Andhra Pradesh, a village in India

Tallapaka is also a Telugu surname and may refer to:

- Tallapaka Annamacharya, the first Carnatic music composer
- Tallapaka Tirumalamma, the first Telugu female poet
