= Annamacharya =

Indian musician and composer (1408–1503)

Annamacharya తాళ్లపాక అన్నమాచార్య
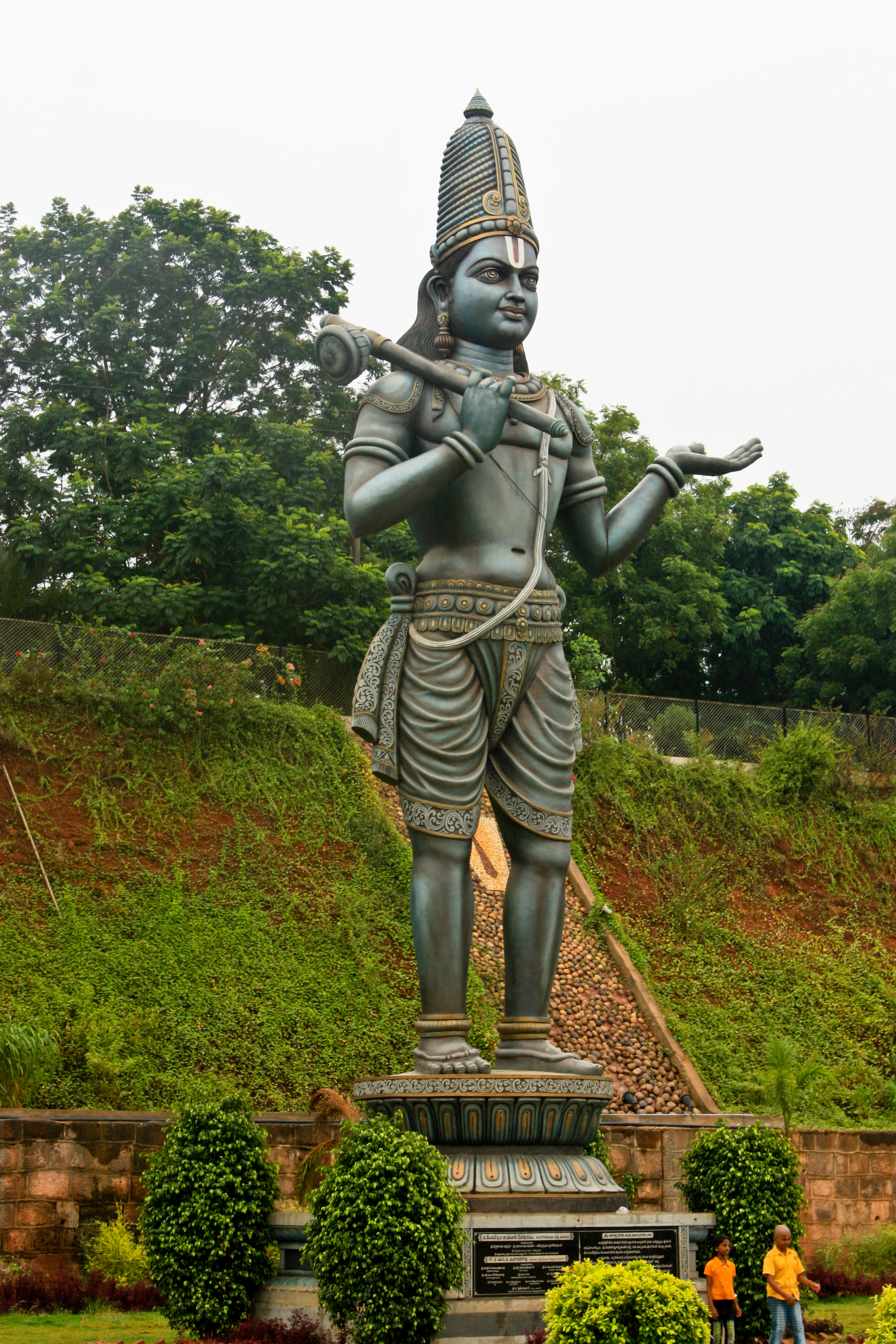
- A statue of Annamacharya at Dwaraka Tirumala, in Andhra Pradesh, India

Background information
- Also known as: Annamayya, Pada Kavitha Pitaamahudu
- Born: 9 May 1408; Tallapaka, Rajampeta, Vijayanagara Empire (modern-day Rajampet, Andhra Pradesh, India)
- Died: 23 February 1503 (aged 94) Tirumala, Vijayanagara Empire (modern-day Andhra Pradesh, India)
- Genre: Carnatic
- Occupations: saint, poet, composer, writer
- Instrument: Tambura

Tallapaka Annamacharya (Telugu: తాళ్ళపాక అన్నమాచార్య, romanized: Tāḷḷapāka Annamācārya; 9 May 1408 – 23 February 1503), also known as Annamayya, was a Telugu composer and Hindu saint. Born in Thallapaka, he composed devotional songs known as saṁkīrtanas in praise of Venkateswara, a form of Vishnu. He is the earliest known Indian musician to utilize this song form.

Annamacharya composed approximately 32,000 saṁkīrtanas, of which 14,904 are extant. His kirtanas are classified into adhyatma (spiritual) and sringara (romantic) genres and are credited with influencing the structural development of Carnatic music. His work also addressed social issues of his era, including the status of untouchable castes.

తాళ్లపాక అన్నమాచార్యులు

In the Sri Vaishnava tradition, he is identified as an avatar of Nandaka, the sword of Vishnu. He is referred to in Telugu literature as Āndhra Pāḍākavita Mahāpita ("Grandfather of Telugu Songwriting").

== Personal life ==
Tallapaka Annamacharya was born on Vaishakha Shuddha Pournami in the year Sarwadhari (22 May 1408) in Tallapaka, Near Rajampet Mandalam, a village in present-day Annamayya district of Andhra Pradesh, India. Even though his parents belonged to the Nandavarika Niyogi Brahmin community of Smarta tradition, he was given Samashrayana initiation by Ghana-Vishnu, and became a Vaishnava of the Ramanuja Sri Vaishnava Sampradaya tradition. He decided to go to Ahobilam in order to receive instructions from Satakopa Swami, the founder of Ahobila Matha. He spent many years in Ahobilam where he acquired the knowledge of Naalayira Divya Prabandham and the philosophy of Vishishtadvaita. His wife, Timmakka, had written Subhadra Kalyanam, and is considered the first female poet in Telugu literature. Their son, Pedda Tirumalacharya, and grandson, Tallapaka Chinnayya, were also composers and poets. The Tallapaka compositions are considered to have dominated and influenced the structure of Carnatic music compositions. Annamacharya lived for 95 years until Phalguna Bahula (Krishna) Dvadashi (the twelfth day after the full moon) in the year Dhundhubhi (4 April 1503).

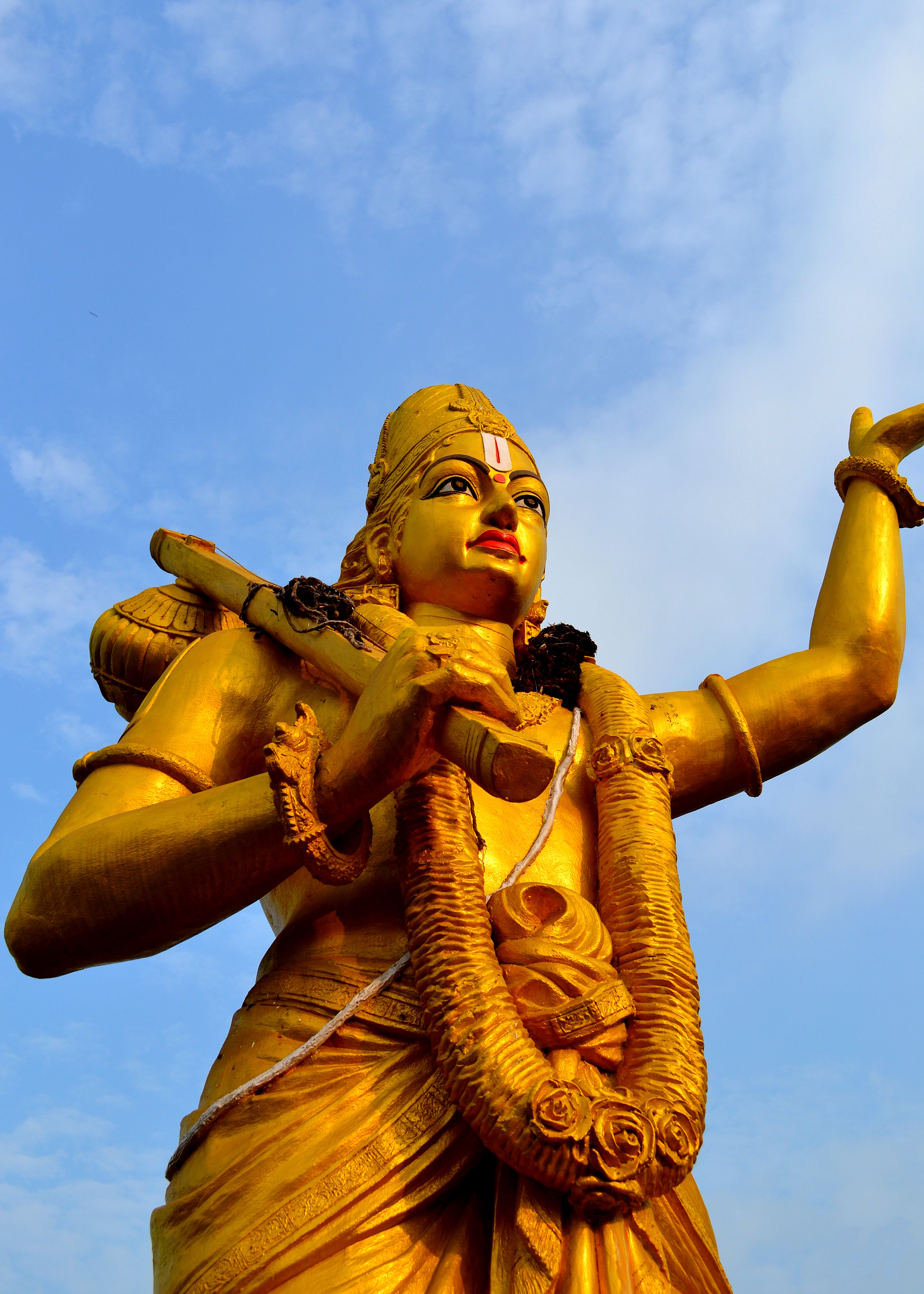
A statue of Tallapaka Annamacharya situated at the Sarada River Park in Anakapalle, Andhra Pradesh.

== Literary career ==
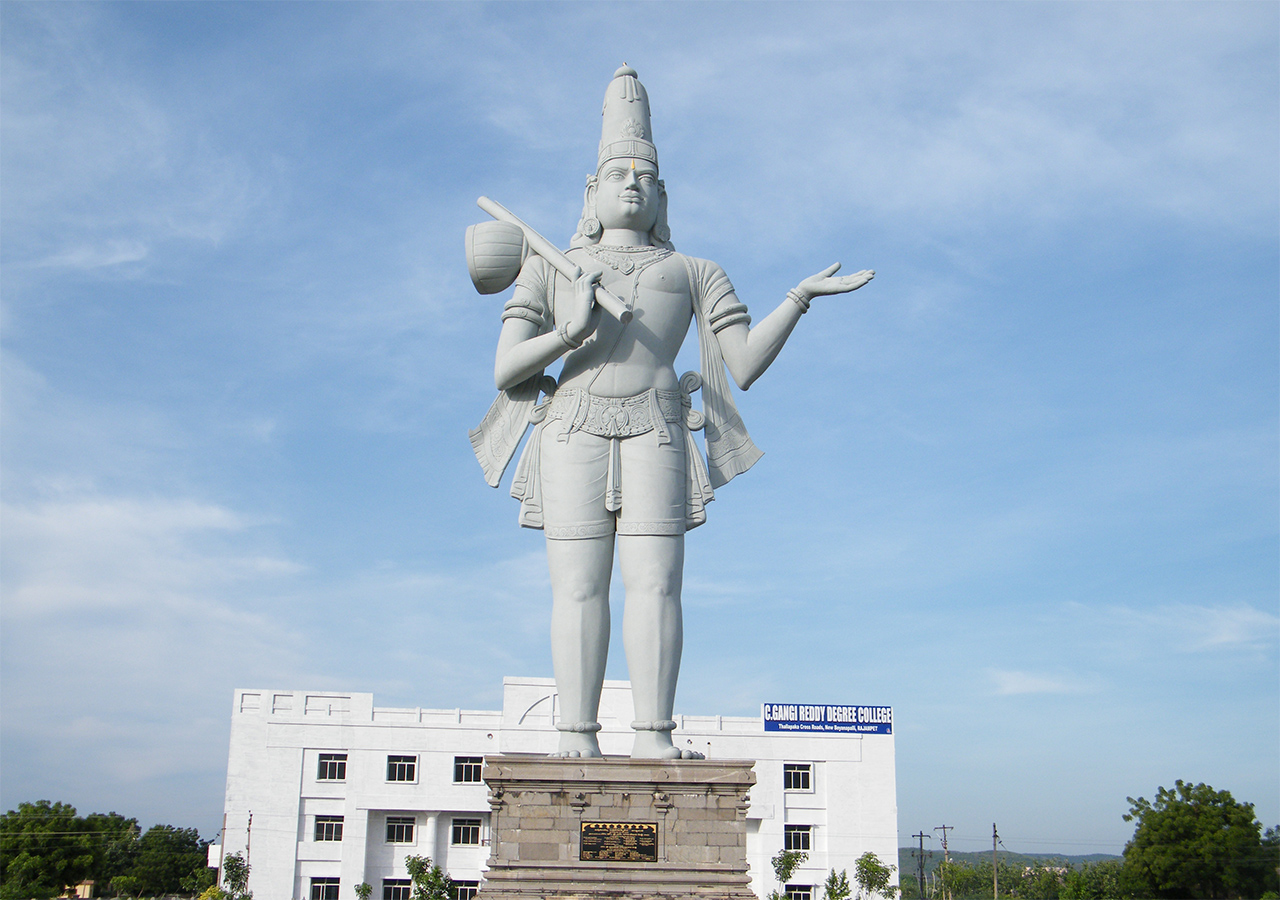
10-story tall statue of Annamacharya located at the entrance of Tallapaka.

Annamayya is said to have composed as many as 32,000 samkirtanas (songs) on the praise of Venkateswara of which only about 12,000 are available today. He is also the author of musical treatise called "Saṁkīrtana Lakṣaṇamu".

Annamayya considered his compositions as floral offerings to Venkateswara. In the poems, he praises the deity, describes his love for him, argues and quarrels with the deity, confesses the devotee's failures and apprehensions, and surrenders himself to Venkateswara. His songs are classified into the Adhyatma (spiritual) and Shringara (romantic) samkirtanas genres. His songs in the sringara genre worship Venkateswara by describing the romantic adventures of the deity and his consort Alamelu, while others describe the bhakti of his devotees.

In his later Samkeertanas, he espouses subjects such as morality, dharma, and righteousness. He was one of the first few who opposed the social stigma towards the untouchable castes in his era, with his samkirtanas explaining that the relationship between God and humans is the same irrespective of the latter's colour, caste and financial status, in his songs "Brahmaṃ Okkatē Paraḥbrahmamokkatē" and "ē kulajuḍainanēmi evvaḍainanēmi".

== Legacy ==
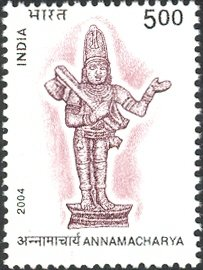
2004 Indian stamp of Annamacharya

While he enjoyed popularity in his days, his compositions were forgotten for over three centuries. Mentioned in 1849, they were later found engraved on copper plates, hidden for centuries inside the Venkateswara temple at Tirumala, just opposite the hundi, concealed in a very small room. An English translation of 150 of these verses was published in 2005.

Tirumala Tirupati Devasthanams, also known as TTD, has been endeavouring to preserve the rich heritage of his compositions. In the year 1950, The State Government of Andhra Pradesh created a committee and appointed the musician late Dr. M. Balamuralikrishna as its head. He set music to over 800 compositions of Annamacharya. He was the Āsthāna Gāyaka of the Tirumala temple at Tirupati for two decades. He is regarded as a legend for rendering devotional music in classical style, especially the Annamacharya Sankirtanas. He was also an acclaimed poet, singer, and musicologist. In 1979, the singer Smt. M. S. Subbulakshmi's album Balaji Pancharatna Mala came up with Annamacharya samkeerthanas like Vande Vasudevam, Bhavamulona, Sriman Narayana and many more.

Shobha Raju is the first recipient of the Tirumala Tirupati Devasthanams scholarship in 1976 to study and set a trend for the propagation of Annamacharya's compositions, and was also chosen as the first exclusive artiste for the propagation of Tallapaka's compositions in 1978. Her first audio album, "Vēnkatēśvara Gīta Mālika" is globally popular among the Telugu community. She is the founder of Annamacharya Bhavana Vahini (ABV) in 1983, which is located in Hyderabad, India. She has been awarded Padmashri by the Government of India, in 2010 in recognition of her efforts to promote Annamayya Compositions. Garimella Balakrishna Prasad, a Carnatic music exponent and the Asthana Vidwan of Tirumala Tirupati Devasthanams has set tune to more than six hundred songs written by Annamacharya, gave audio recordings for TTD, published books with musical notations and conducted classes, teaching the songs to make them more popular.

In 1994, reputed Bharathanatyam artist Parvathi Ravi Ghantasala, also the daughter-in-law of the singer Ghantasala Venkateswara Rao, for the first time produced and presented a mammoth dance production as a tribute to the divine composer titled "Annamaiyah". Rare and popular songs were woven into a story format and music by stalwarts was set to action. This production was inaugurated by the former President of India R. Venkatraman and Bharat Ratna-winning singer M. S. Subbulakshmi and later that year for the Tirumala Brahmotsavam. In 2009, a DVD of the production was launched which included several places visited by the saint himself.

A Telugu film named Annamayya was made on him by K. Raghavendra Rao in 1997. It starred Nagarjuna in the lead role as Annamacharya and also featured Suman as Venkateswara and Bhanupriya as Goddess Padmavati in important roles.

In 2017, one of Annamayya's compositions, Brahmam Okate, became a YouTube sensation. As of early 2019, this video alone (produced by Kuldeep M. Pai) has garnered over 11 million views and made the child singers Sooryagayathri and Rahul Vellal household names for their flawless rendering of the classic keerthana. Professional singers P. Unnikrishnan and Sreeranjini Kodampally have their performances of the composition on YouTube.

== Compositions ==
This is a partial list of some of the most famous Tallapaka Annamacharya compositions.

- Note – (చ=Ca; ఛ=Cha; శ=Śa; ష=Ṣ. For more see Romanization of Telugu)

Composition	Rāga	Tāla	Music Set By	Language	Notes
Adivō Alladivō Śriharivāsamu అదివో అల్లదివో శ్రీహరివాసము	Madhyamavati	Adi	Dr. Shobha Raju	Telugu	
Alara Cañcalamaina Ātmalanduṇḍa అలర చంచలమైన ఆత్మలందుండ	Rāga mālika	khanDa cApu	Garimella Balakrishna Prasad	Telugu	
Alarulu Kuriyaga Āḍinadē అలరులు కురియగ ఆడినదే	Sankarabharanam		Rallapalli Ananta Krishna Sharma	Telugu	
Anni Mantramulu Indē Āvahiñcenū అన్ని మంత్రములు ఇందే ఆవహించెనూ	Amritavarshini			Telugu	
Antarangameḷḷa Srihariki అంతరంగమెళ్ళ శ్రీహరికి		Adi (Tisra Nadaka)	Nedunuri Krishnamurthy	Telugu	
Antaryāmi Alasiti Solasiti అంతర్యామి అలసితి సొలసితి	Shivaranjani			Telugu	
Bhāvayāmi Gōpālabālaṁ Manassēvitaṁ భావయామి గోపాలబాలం మనస్సేవితం	Yamunā Kaḷyāṇi	Khanda Chapu	Kadayanallur Venkataraman	Sanskrit	
Bhāvamulōna Bāhyamunandunu భావములోన బాహ్యమునందును	Śuddha Dhanyasi	Adi	Nedunuri Krishnamurthy	Telugu	
Brahma Kaḍigina Pādamu బ్రహ్మ కడిగిన పాదము	Mukhāri	Adi	Rallapalli Ananta Krishna Sharma	Telugu	
Brahmaṁ Okaṭē బ్రహ్మం ఒకటే	Bowli	Adi	Dr. Shobha Raju	Telugu	Tatva Prabōdha Kīrtana
Cakkani Talliki Chāṅgubhaḷā చక్కని తల్లికి ఛాంగుభళా				Telugu	
Cāladā Harināma Saukhyāmr̥tamu చాలదా హరినామ సౌఖ్యామృతము				Telugu	
Cēri Yaśōdaku Śiśuvitan̆ḍu చేరి యశోదకు శిశువితఁడు	Mohanam	Adi		Telugu	
Candamāma Rāve Jābilli Rāve చందమామ రావే జాబిల్లి రావే				Telugu	
Dēvadēvaṁ Bhajē Divya Prabhāvaṁ దేవదేవం భజే దివ్య ప్రభావం	Hindolam	Khanda Chapu	Sripada Pinakapani	Sanskrit	
Ḍōlāyāṁ Cala ḍōlāyāṁ డోలాయాం చల డోలాయాం	Khamas	Thisra Adi		Telugu	
Ēmakō Ciguruṭadharamuna Eḍaneḍakastūri Niṇḍenu ఏమకో చిగురుటధరమున ఎడనెడకస్తూరి నిండెను				Telugu	
Ē Purāṇamuna Enta Vedakinā ఏ పురాణమున ఎంత వెదకినా				Telugu	
Govindāśrita Gōkula Br̥ndā గోవిందాశ్రిత గోకుల బృందా	Madhuvanti			Telugu	
Harināmame Kaḍu Ānandakaramu హరినామమే కడు ఆనందకరము	Jonpuri			Telugu	
Indariki Abhayammuliccu Cēyi ఇందరికి అభయమ్ములిచ్చు చేయి				Telugu	
Ippuḍiṭu Kalagaṇṭi ఇప్పుడిటు కలగంటి				Telugu	
Itarulaku Ninneruga Taramā ఇతరులకు నిన్నెరుగ తరమా				Telugu	
Jō Acyutānanda Jō Jō Mukundā జో అచ్యుతానంద జో జో ముకుందా	Navroj			Telugu	
Kaṇṭi Śukravāramu Gaḍiyalēḍiṇṭa కంటి శుక్రవారము గడియలేడింట				Telugu	
Koṁḍalalō Nelakonna Kōnēṭi Rāyaḍu Vāḍu కొండలలో నెలకొన్న కోనేటి రాయడు వాడు	Hindolam			Telugu	
Kṣīrābdi Kanyakaku Śrīmahālakṣmikini క్షీరాబ్ది కన్యకకు శ్రీమహాలక్ష్మికిని	Kurinji(raga)	Khanda Chapu		Telugu	
Kulukaka Naḍavarō Kommalārā కులుకక నడవరో కొమ్మలారా	Atana	Adi		Telugu	
Mādhava Kēśava Madhusūdhana మాధవ కేశవ మధుసూదన	Kapi	Adi		Sanskrit	
Mēdini Jīvula Gāva Mēlukōvayyā మీదిని జీవుల గావ మేలుకోవయ్యా				Telugu	
Muddugārē Yaśōda Muṅgiṭa Mutayamu Vīḍu ముద్దుగారే యశోద ముంగిట ముత్యము వీడు	Kuranji	Adi	Nedunuri Krishnamurthy	Telugu	
Mūsina Mutyālakēlē Moragulu మూసిన ముత్యాలకేలే మొరగులు				Telugu	
Nallani Mēni Nagavu Chūpulavāḍu నల్లని మేని నగవు చూపులవాడు				Telugu	
Namō Namō Raghukulanāyaka నమో నమో రఘుకులనాయక	Nattai			Sanskrit	
Nānāṭi Batuku Nāṭakamu నానాటి బతుకు నాటకము	Rēvati	Adi	Nedunuri Krishnamurthy	Telugu	
Nārāyaṇa Tē Namō Namō నారాయణ తే నమో నమో	Bihag	Adi	'	Sanskrit	
Neyyamullallō Nērēḷḷo Voyyana Ūreḍi Uvviḷḷō నెయ్యములల్లో నేరేళ్ళో వొయ్యన ఊరెడి ఉవ్విళ్ళో				Telugu	
Nityapūjalivivō Nericinānōhō నిత్యపూజలివివో నేరిచినానోహో				Telugu	
Paluku Tēnelatalli Pavaḷiñcenu పలుకు తేనెలతల్లి పవళించెను				Telugu	
Poḍaganṭimayyā Mimmu Puruṣōttamā పొడగంటిమయ్యా మిమ్ము పురుషోత్తమా	Mohanam	Adi		Telugu	
Śrimannārāyaṇā Śrimannārāyaṇā Nī Śrīpādamē Śaraṇu శ్రీమన్నారాయణ శ్రీమన్నారాయణ నీ శ్రీపాదమే శరణు	Bowli	Adi		Telugu	
Rajīva Nētrāya Raghavāya Namō రాజీవ నేత్రాయ రాఘవాయ నమో	Madhyamavathi	Khanda Chapu	K. J. Yesudas	Sanskrit	
Ramacandruḍitaḍu Raghuvīruḍu రామచంద్రుడితడు రఘువీరుడు				Telugu	
Siruta Navvulavāḍu Sinnakkā సిరుత నవ్వులవాడు సిన్నక్కా				Telugu	
Ṣōḍaśa Kaḷānidhiki Ṣōḍaśōpacāramulu షోడశ కళానిధికి షోడశోపచారములు				Telugu	
Tvamēva Śaraṇam త్వమేవ శరణం				Telugu	
Vandēhaṁ Jagadvallabhaṁ వందేహం జగద్వల్లభం	Hamsadhvani	Khanda Chapu		Sanskrit	In praise of Venkaṭēśvara
Vandē Vāsudēvaṁ Śrīpatiṁ వందే వాసుదేవం శ్రీపతిం	Sri	Khanda Chapu		Sanskrit	
Vēḍukondāmā Vēṅkaṭagiri Veṅkaṭēśvaruni Vēḍukondāmā వేడుకొందామా వేంకటగిరి వేంకటేశ్వరుని వేడుకొందామా				Telugu	
Vinnapālu Vinavale Vintavintalu విన్నపాలు వినవలె వింతవింతలు				Telugu	

అన్నమయ్య పాటలు (All Annamayya songs lyrics in Telugu Script)

== See also ==
- List of Carnatic composers
- Annamacharya sankeertana
- List of composers who created ragas
- Check out "సంకీర్తన లక్షణము" on Wikisource at https://te.wikisource.org/wiki/%E0%B0%B8%E0%B0%82%E0%B0%95%E0%B1%80%E0%B0%B0%E0%B1%8D%E0%B0%A4%E0%B0%A8_%E0%B0%B2%E0%B0%95%E0%B1%8D%E0%B0%B7%E0%B0%A3%E0%B0%AE%E0%B1%81
