= Harinie Jeevitha =

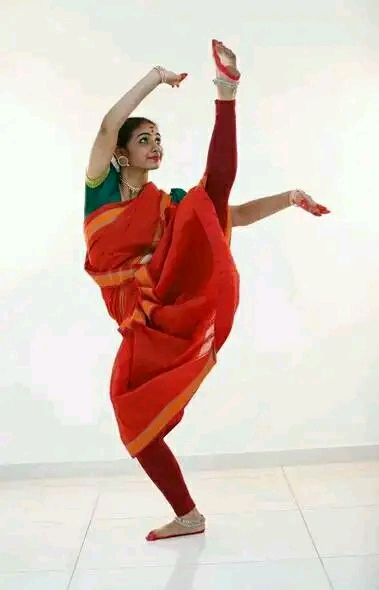
- Born: Harinie Jeevitha Narasimhan; January 16, 1995 (age 31); India
- Occupations: Bharatanatyam dancer, Choreographer, author
- Years active: 2005–present
- Known for: Bharatanatyam
- Style: Melattur

Harinie Jeevitha (Tamil: ஹரிணி ஜீவிதா) is an Indian classical dancer and choreographer. A senior disciple of Sheela Unnikrishnan of Sridevi Nrithyalaya, she started training at the age of six in the Melattur style of Bharatanatyam and, within three months, performed a minor role in the production Balaramayanam.

Harinie became a well-known name in dance circles from a very young age and is "recognized for the depth of research, understanding, and internalization" she brings to her performances. According to The Hans India, Harinie brought "conversational vibrancy" to her work through her "skillful blending of nritta, natya, and abhinaya".

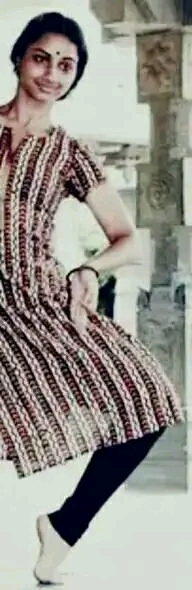

At the age of nine she performed her first solo and completed her arangetram in 2006. From a very young age, Harinie became a well-known name in dance circles and is 'recognized for the depth of research, understanding, and internalization' she brings to her performances. According to Hans India, Harinie brought 'conversational vibrancy' to her work through her 'skillful blending of nritta, natya, and abhinaya.

"Harinie’s performance stood out for its grace and artistry." The Hindu, 2024

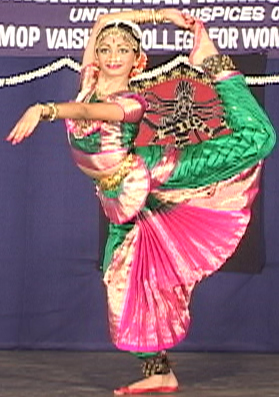
Parsvanikutttakam - one of the 108 karanas in the classical Indian dance.

In 2009, Harinie was conferred the Bal Shree title by the National Bal Bhavan in the field of Creative Performance, an honor constituted by the Government of India. Dance critic, Rupa Srikanth of The Hindu described Harinie as 'a dancer who has it all: a personable presence, an excellent sense of timing, grace, agility, suppleness, perfection in execution, an expressive face, and a palpable passion.'

In 2023, after participating in eighteen dance dramas choreographed by her teacher, Harinie presented her first independent production, titled Varadarajam Upasmahe.

She has authored and published two poetry collections: Perspectives and The Siblings of Kanchipuram: A Garland of Poems.

Harinie continues to perform at prestigious dance festivals in India and abroad. As of February 2026, Harinie no longer performs as part of Sheela Unnikrishnan's troupe and is not an instructor with Sridevi Nrithayalaya. Instead, she has decided to expand upon her journey as an independent artist and soloist.

== Education ==
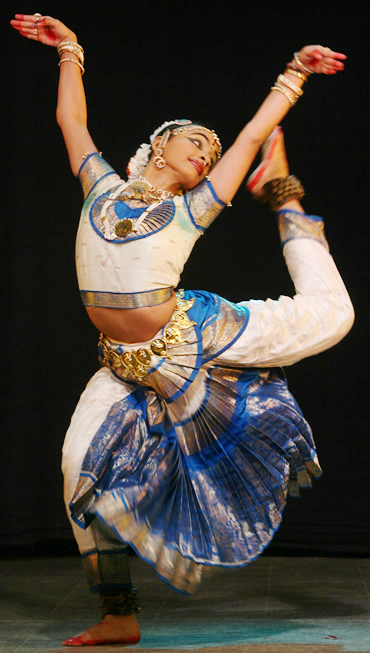
Harinie Jeevitha

Harinie graduated with a degree in English Literature and later completed her post-graduation in Dance. She was awarded a scholarship by the Ministry of Culture, Government of India, under the Scholarship to Young Artists Scheme for the years 2015–16 and 2016–17.

Harinie is also an 'A' grade artist with Doordarshan.

== Awards and recognition ==
- Bala Shree title from National Bal Bhavan, 2009
- Won the Excellency Award by the VDS Arts Academy
- Received Ranjani Rajan Award as the Best Dancer
- 1st prize at the Classical Duo (with Archana Raja) and the 2nd at the Classical Solo dance contests of Akhil Bharatiya Sanskrutik Sangh (Pune, 2009)
- 1st prize in the final round of Konjum Salangai dance competition series by Doordarshan TV (Podigai), 2008
- 1st prize (Feb 2008) and 2nd prize (2009) in the all-India level (mixed age group) Bharatanatyam * competition in Hyderabad organized by Navya Nataka Samiti
- 1st prize in the all-India level Bharatanatyam competition in Bangalore (2008) conducted by Gopinath Das Nyasa
- 1st prize in Thaka-Dhimi-Tha, a dance competition show conducted by Jaya TV
- 1st prize in Bharathanatyam dance contest conducted by Sivan Arts Academy (2005)
- 1st prize in the junior category at the Bharatanatyam contest by Concern India in 2009
- Best Bharatanatyam Dancer 2007 Award in the Junior Category from the Auroville Cultural Exchange
- Prize from Kanaka Sabha (Mumbai) in all-India Level Competition
- Prizes in Jawahar Bala Bhawan (Tamil Nadu) state- and Chennai district- level competitions
- 1st prize in the Jaya Vidya Learning Centre's Bharatanatyam contest
- Received the YGP Golden Jubilee Award as the "Best Actor" is also a recipient of the Bharat Kalachar scholarships for dance for 2004 – 2010

== Solo performances abroad ==
- Kuala Lumpur, Malaysia (2020)
- Sydney, Australia (2019)
- Melbourne, Australia (2018)
- Toronto, Canada (2017)
- Singapore (2014)
- Oslo, Norway (2012)

== Solo performances in India ==
- Kartik Fine Arts (2020)
- SABHA, Sridevi Nrithyalaya (2020)
- Narada Gana Sabha (2019)
- IIT, Mumbai (2019)
- Chamber concerts in Bangalore (2019)
- Sri Krishna Gana Sabha (2019)
- Annual Dance Festival, The Music Academy (2019)
- Sri Krishna Gana Sabha (2018)
- Satyam Sivam Sundaram (2018)
- Sri Krishna Gana Sabha (2017)
- Annual Dance Festival, The Music Academy (2017)
- Mid Year Dance Festival, Music Academy (2016)
- Satyam Sivam Sundaram (2016)
- Sri Krishna Gana Sabha (2016)
- HCL Concert Series, Music Academy (2015)
- Natyarangam, Narada Gana Sabha (2015)
- RR Sabha (2014)
- Spirit of Youth, Music Academy (2014)
- Mylapore Fine Arts Club (2013)
- Sri Krishna Gana Sabha (2013)
- Thyaga Brahma Gana Sabha (2012)
- Indian Fine Arts Society (2012)
- Sri Krishna Gana Sabha (2011)
- Yuva Utsav, Bharat Kalachar (2011)
- Satyam Sivam Sundaram (2011)
- Brahma Gana Sabha (2010)
- Thyaga Brahma Gana Sabha (2010)
- Kartik Fine Arts (2009)
- Nungambakkam Cultural Academy (2008)
- Parthasarathy Swami Sabha (2007)
- VDS Arts Academy (2007)
- Guruvayur Temple, Trivandrum (2006)
- Pollachi Tamil Sangham (2006)
- Balasaraswathi Festival (2005)
- VDS Arts Academy (2004)

== Sources ==
- The Hindu
- Times of India
