= Melattur =

Melattur may refer to:

- Melattur, Kerala, a town in the Indian state of Kerala
- Melattur, Tamil Nadu, a village in the Indian state of Tamil Nadu
- Melattur style, a variety of Bharata Natyam dance which originated in the Tamil village
