= Kuldeep Pai =

Indian musician

Kuldeep M. Pai
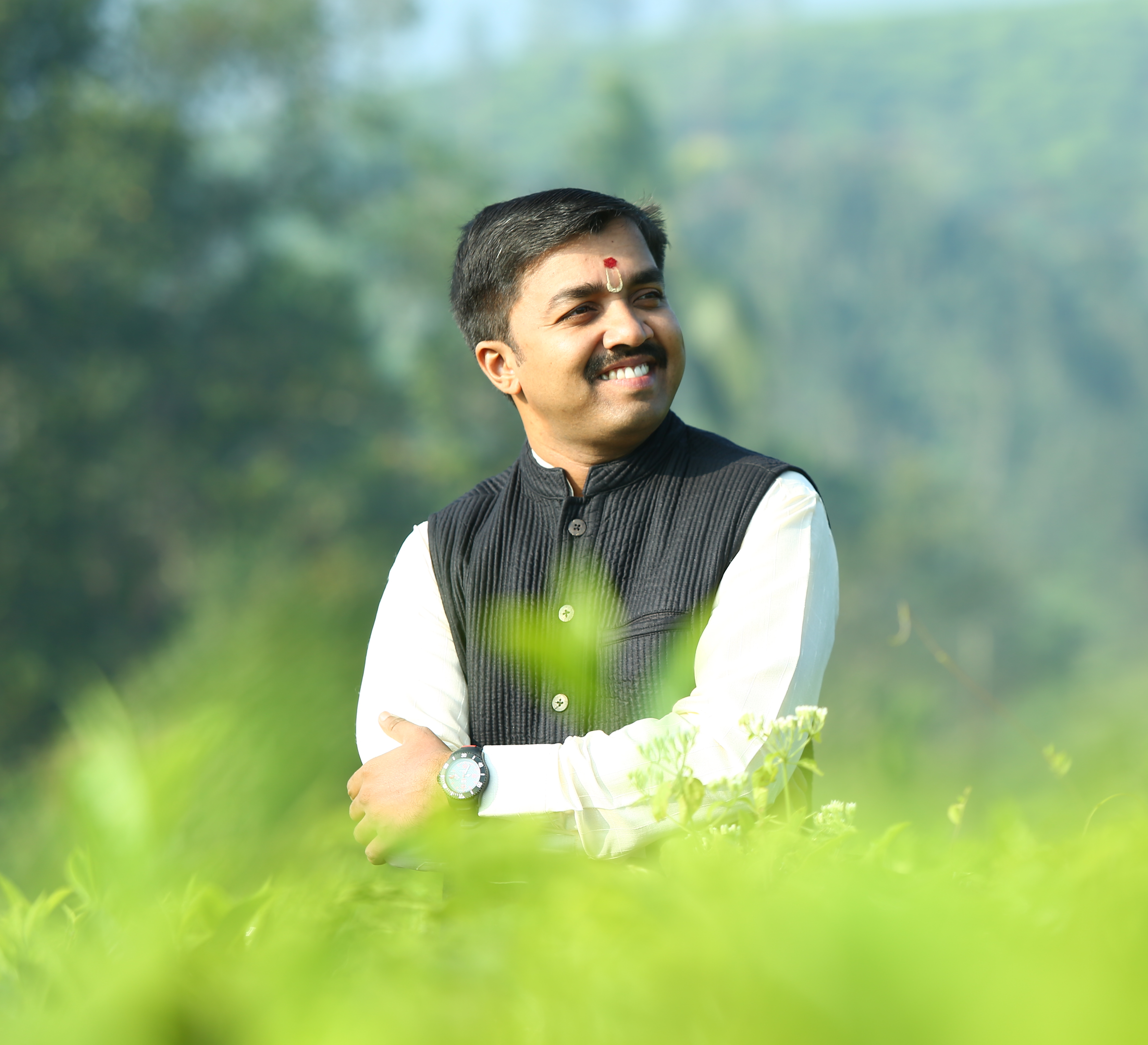
- Born: 9 January 1982 (age 44); Thammanam, Kochin, Kerala, India
- Occupations: Musician; Composer; Carnatic music vocalist Music producer YouTube personality
- Spouse: Roopa Revathi
- Website: http://kuldeepmpai.com/

Kuldeep Muralidhar Pai (born 9 January 1982), best known as Kuldeep M Pai, is an Indian musician, composer, Carnatic music vocalist, and music producer. His videos are mainly performed by children and are released under his own recording label, Chith Studios.

== Early life and education ==
Pai was born in the Thammanam neighborhood in the heart of Kochi city in Kerala state to V. S. Vijayakumari and G. Muralidhar Pai. His mother tongue is Konkani. He has a younger sister.

Pai completed his schooling in St. Jude's school, CCPLM Anglo Indian High School and Pre-university course (PUC) at Cochin College, Kerala. He graduated with a bachelor's degree in Computer Applications in BPC College Piravom, Kochi. He won the 'Kala Pratibha' Award in the Mahatma Gandhi University Youth Festival in 1999.

He was a gold medalist in Masters of Indian Classical Music at University of Madras and also holds a Diploma in Sound Engineering.

He was formally trained by N. P. Ramaswamy, Antony and O. S. Thiagarajan in Carnatic vocals; Hariharan in Violin and Ramamurthy in Western Classical Piano. He learned Mridangam from four masters: Dennis, Vaikom S. Gopakumar, Kalamandalam Krishnankutty, and Mannargudi Easwaran. He is a self-taught player of harmonium and flute.

== Career ==
In 2002, Pai moved from Kochi to Chennai along with his family, to begin his career. His voice was praised by P. Vijayambika, though T. T. Narendran said of one concert that "the image of the raga eluded him".

He established a career as a singer of Carnatic music. He has accompanied the singers O. S. Arun, S. Janaki, and Vani Jairam on harmonium for nearly 300 concerts since 2014. He has also sung for Indian classical dance performances for almost eleven years. He has also provided vocal support for few Indian jingles. From 2015, he began performing online.

Pai is an Ashtavadhani, His album Adviteeya is an experimental album in Carnatic genre where he has sung to his own live accompaniments of violin, mridangam, ghatam, kanjira, tabla, harmonium and melodica. This album was released by his guru O. S. Thyagarajan on 22 November 2006 in Chennai, and singer S. Janaki received the first copy.

=== Music direction and composition ===
Pai has composed and rendered four songs for a Switzerland-based multi-lingual movie titled “Madly in Love.” He has composed music for dance dramas like “ Janani Jagath Karani” and “Sri Krishna Vaibhavam” produced by Sri Devi Nrithyalaya. He has also had famous songs like Paluke Bangaramayena, Vaishnav Janato, Pibare Rama Rasam, Brahmamokate, Shivashtakam, Mahalakshmi Ashtakam & Ram Govind Hare sung by a young musical artist Rahul Vellal and stotras for his YouTube spiritual music series, 'Vande Guru Paramparaam', including Ganesha Pancharatnam, Shivashtakam, Namo Namo Bharathambe, Shiva Panchaakshara Stotram, Mahalakshmi Ashtakam, Ashtalakshmi Stotram, Bhavani Ashtakam, Rama Ashtakam and other devotional songs. He is currently pursuing training in Western Classical music. He also has many Sanskrit songs including Ashtakam composed by Adiguru Shankaracharya etc.

== Awards and recognition ==
In 2008, Pai received the D. K. Pattammal award of excellence from Karthik Fine Arts. He has also received the “Yuvakalabharathi” award from Bharath Kalachar in 2007. Pai also received the 'Social Harmony Award' in the field of music, arts and culture at the International Convention of Peacemakers for Universal Harmony in Goa.
