= Garimella Balakrishna Prasad =

Indian singer and composer (1948–2025)

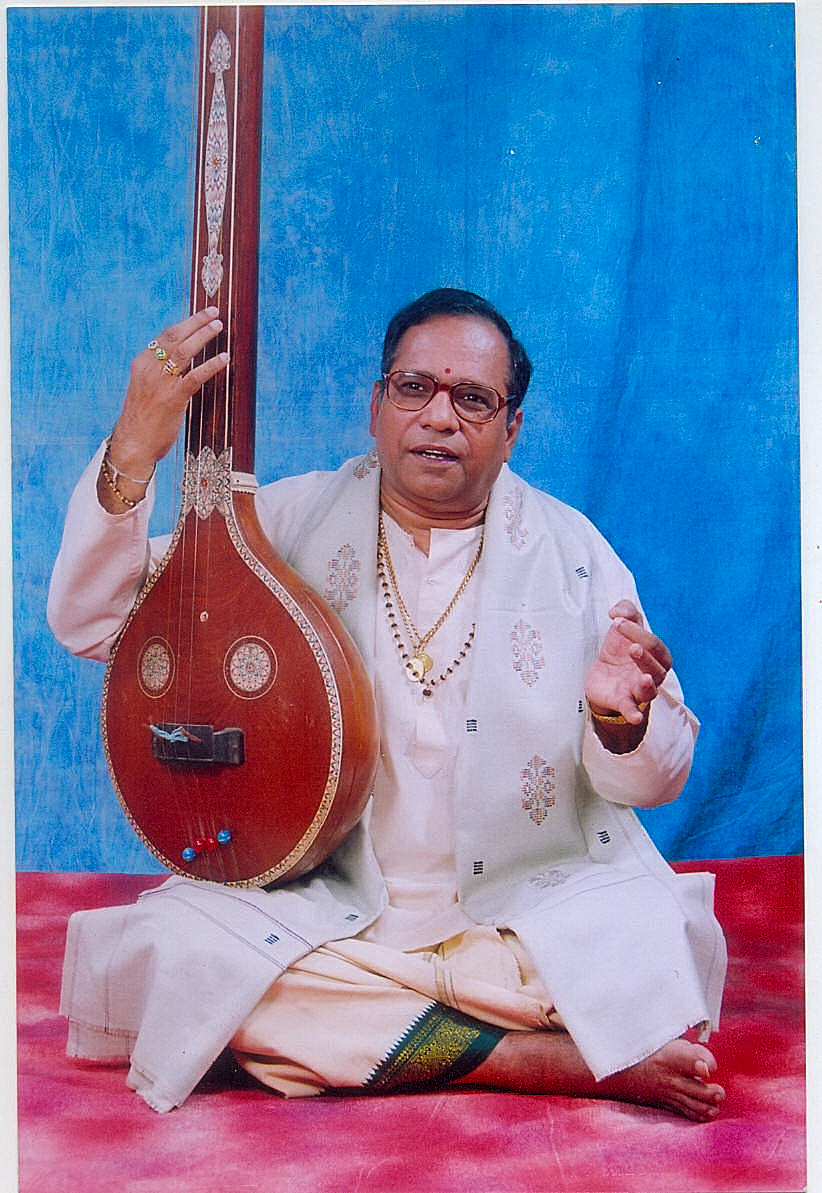

Background information
- Born: 9 November 1948; Rajamundry, Andhra Pradesh, India
- Died: 9 March 2025 (aged 76) Tirupati, Andhra Pradesh, India
- Genre: Carnatic music
- Occupations: Classical singer; composer
- Instruments: Vocals; mridangam
- Years active: 1970–2025
- Awards: Sangeet Natak Akademi Award (2020); Padma Shri (2026)

Garimella Balakrishna Prasad (9 November 1948 – 9 March 2025) was an Indian classical vocalist and composer renowned for his devotional music in the Carnatic tradition. Hailing from Andhra Pradesh, he was a distinguished exponent of Annamacharya compositions and contributed significantly to the preservation and popularization of Telugu devotional music. Prasad served as Asthana Vidwan (resident musician) at several prominent religious institutions, including the Tirumala Tirupati Devasthanams (TTD), Ahobilam temple, and the Kanchi Kamakoti Peetham. He was associated with TTD’s Annamacharya Project as a Special Grade Vocal Artiste from 1978 to 2006, playing a pivotal role in reviving and rendering the saint-poet Annamacharya's works for contemporary audiences. In recognition of his contributions to Carnatic music, he was honored with the Sangeet Natak Akademi Award in 2020.

Prasad was regarded as a pioneer in composing and rendering Annamacharya Sankeerthanas in various Indian musical genres like classical, semi-classical, light and folk styles. He composed tunes for the lyrics of nearly 1400 songs composed by various poets. Of these nearly 1000 of them were Annamacharya sankirtanas. To mention a few most popular sankeerthanas set to tune by Sri Prasad are Vinaro Bhagyamu Vishnukatha, Jagadapu Chanavula, Vachenu Alamelumanga, Tiruveedhula Merasi, Choodaramma Satulaala, Jayalakhmi Varalakshmi, Aadimoolame maaku angaraksha, Mangambudhi Hamumantha, Antayu neeve, Yemani pogadudume, Annimantramulu and Pidikita Thalambrala.

== Performing career ==
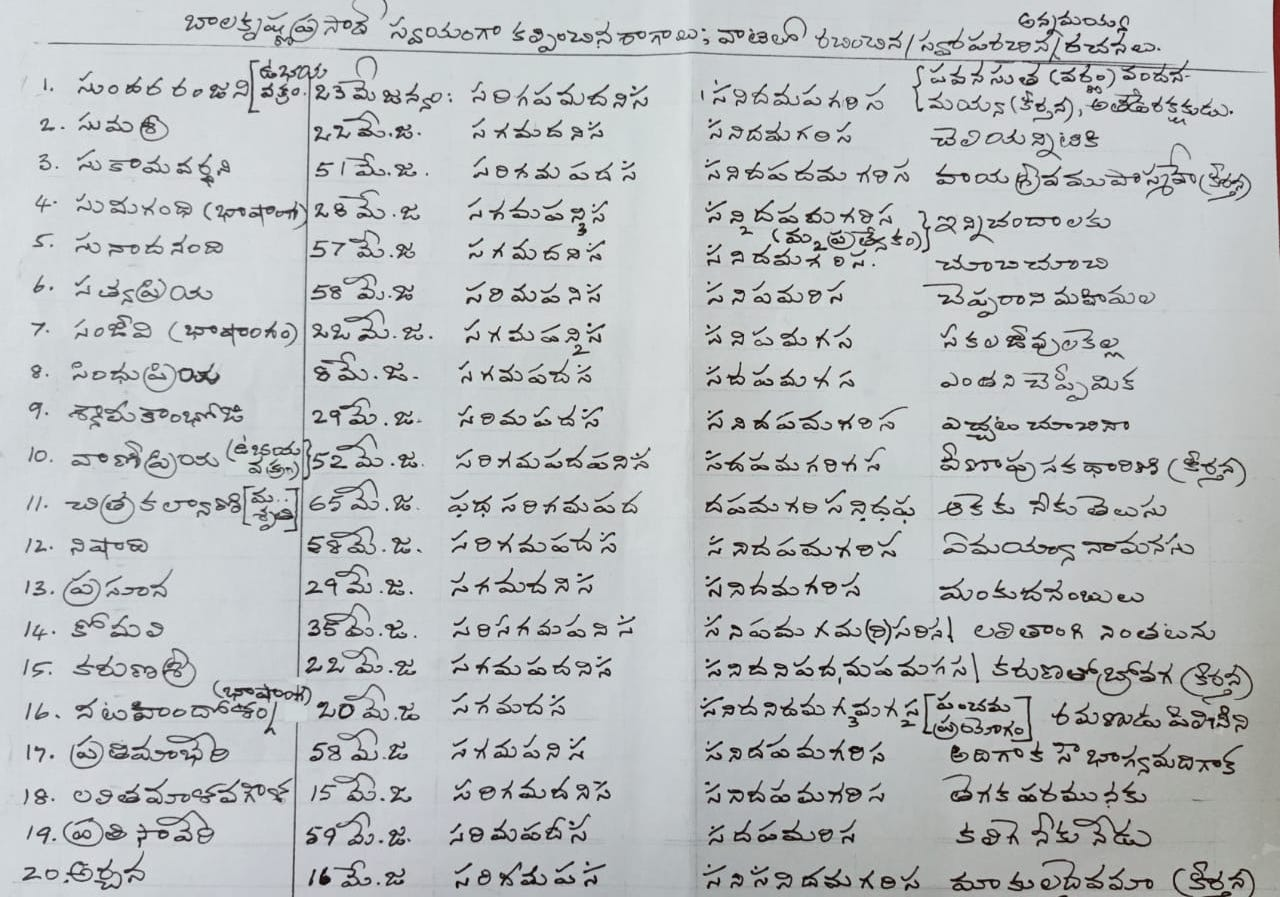
New raagas by Garimella Balakrishna Prasad in his own handwriting

Prasad joined the Annamacharya Project after completing his diploma in Carnatic classical vocal music, in 1978 as a vocal artist. The project established to promote Annamacharya's music and literature, soon became the medium through which he was able to bring forth his musical prowess. From the inception till his retirement in 2006, he remained the principal exponent of Annamacharya Project.

== Personal life and death ==
Prasad was married to G. Radha and had two sons; G. S. Pavana Kumar and G. V. N. Anila Kumar. He was the nephew of playback singer S. Janaki.

Prasad died in Tirupati, Andhra Pradesh on 9 March 2025, at the age of 76.

== Awards and Recognition ==
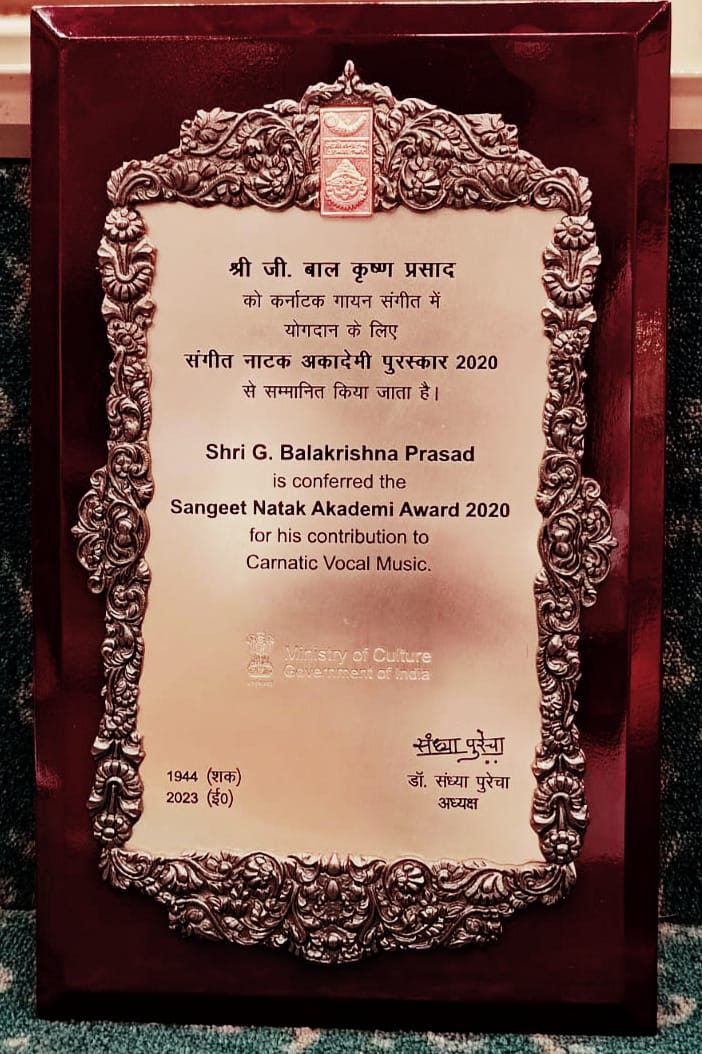
Garimella Balakrishna Prasad Sangeet Natak Akademi

He was honoured with Padma Sri on 26 May 2026

== Discography ==
=== Annamacharya Sankeerthanas, T.T.D Recordings ===
- Annamayya Desi Kavita Ganam
- Annamayya Hari Pada Makarandam
- Annamayya Hari Sankirtana Mrutam
- Annamayya Hari Sharanagati
- Annamayya Madhra Kavitha Ganamu
- Annamayya Ramanjaneya Lahari
- Annamayya Sankeertana Lahari
- Annamayya Tatvaneeti Saramu
- Annamayya Venkatadri Vennela
- Nnamayya Anantaragalu
- Paluku Tene Talli- 1
- Paluku Tene Talli- 2
- Sri Venkateswara Geetamalika
- Srinivasa Sruti Bhushanam
- Venkatadri Nrusimhudu
- Annamayya Gnana Yagnam
- Annamayya Hari Pada Sirulu
- Annamayya Mohana Murari
- Annamayya Sankirtana Brindavanam
- Annamayya Sankirtana Prabha
- Annamayya Sankirtana Prasadam
- Annamayya Sankirtana Sravani
- Annamayya Sankirtana Tarakam
- Annamayya Sri Alamelumanga Vilasam
- Annamayya Sri Hari Kusumanjali
- Annamayya Sri Nrusimha Sankirtana Vaibhavam
- Chinna Tirumalacharyula Pada Vaibhavam
- Nrusimha Pada Dhwani
- Sri Ramanjaneyam
- Sri Venkateswara Vairagyavachanamulu

- Annamayya Archinchina Alamelumanga
- Annamayya Govinda Ganam
- Annamayya Pada Sudha
- Annamayya Pada Sudharnavam
- Annamayya Ramanuja Kirtanam
- Annamayya Sankirtana Madhoolika
- Annamayya Sankirtana Mukthavali
- Annamayya Sankirtana Pushpalathika
- Annamayya Sankirtana Shikhamani
- Annamayya Sankirtana Sumaharam
- Annamayya Sankirtana Sumamalika
- Annamayya Sankirtana Sumasri
- Annamayya Sankirtana Sushama
- Annamayya Sankirtana Vaibhogam
- Annamayya Sri Pranayamu
- Annamayya Pada Kamalalu
- Annamayya Pada Marakataalu
- Annamayya Pada Mudrika
- Annamayya Pada Parimalalu
- Annamayya Pada Prasunalu
- Annamayya Pada Surabhilam
- Annamayya Padaaravindam
- Annamayya Pataku Pattabhishekam - 96
- Annamayya Sankeertana Sumagandhi
- Annamayya Sankeertanaaraamam
- Annamayya Sankirtana Pushpanjali
- Annamayya Sankirtana Pushpavanam
- Annamayya Srirama Pada Lahari
- Taallapaaka Pada Prasadam

=== Annamacharya Sankeerthanas, Other recordings ===
- Annamayya Paarijaatalu
- Annamayya Sankeerthana Sudha
- Bhavayaami
- Annamayya sankeerthana chandrika
- Annamayya Pada Madhuri
- Annamayya Sankeerthana Pushpaalu
- Annamayya Sankeerthana Pushpayaagam
- Tirunivaali
- Annamayya Pada Madhuri
- Srihari Vaibhavam
- Annamayya Sankeerthana Padanidhi
- Annamayya sankeerthana manihaaram
- Annamayya Vinnapaalu
- Annamayya Madhuragaanam
- Annamayya Venkatadri Govindudu
- Annamayya Sri Krishna Padahela
- Annamayya Sankeerthana Vedanaadam
- Annamayya Aanjaneya Sruti Sanjeevani

- Annamayya Sankeerthana Saamagaanam
- Annamayya Sankeerthana Pranavam
- Annamayya Pada Singaaram
- Annamayya Srinidhi Sankeerthanam
- Annamayya Alamelmanga Vaibhavam
- Krishnaarpana
- Annamayya Paatalu
- Annamayya Vishnu Gaanam
- Annamayya Sankeerthana Sarada
- Annamayya Sankeerthana Sanjeevani
- Flowers at his feet
- Annamayya Sankeerthana Bharati
- Sapthagiri sankeerthanalu
- Hari Siripadahele
- Annamayya Achyta Saranu
- Annamayya Pada ratnaalu
- Annmayya Nrusimha Sankeertanam

== Bibliography ==
=== T.T.D. Publications ===
His tunes for Annamayya sankeerthanas have been published by TTD.

- 1993 – Annamacharya Sankeerthana Swara Samputi (Telugu)
- 1997 – Annamacharya Sankeerthana Manjari (Tamil)
- 1999 – Annamacharya Sankeerthana Sankeerthanam (Telugu)
- 2000 – Annamacharya Sankeerthana Saurabham (Telugu)
- 2001 – Annamacharya Sankeerthana Ratnavali (Telugu)
- 2001 – Annamacharya Sankeerthana Swaravali (Tamil)
- 2003 – Annamacharya Sankeerthana Praathamiki (Telugu)
- 2004 – Annamacharya Sankeerthana Mahati (Telugu)

=== Other publications ===
- Krishna Ravali (2 Volumes) (Telugu)
- Anjaneya Kriti Mani Maala (Telugu)
- Annammayya Sankeerthana Sanjeevani (Telugu)

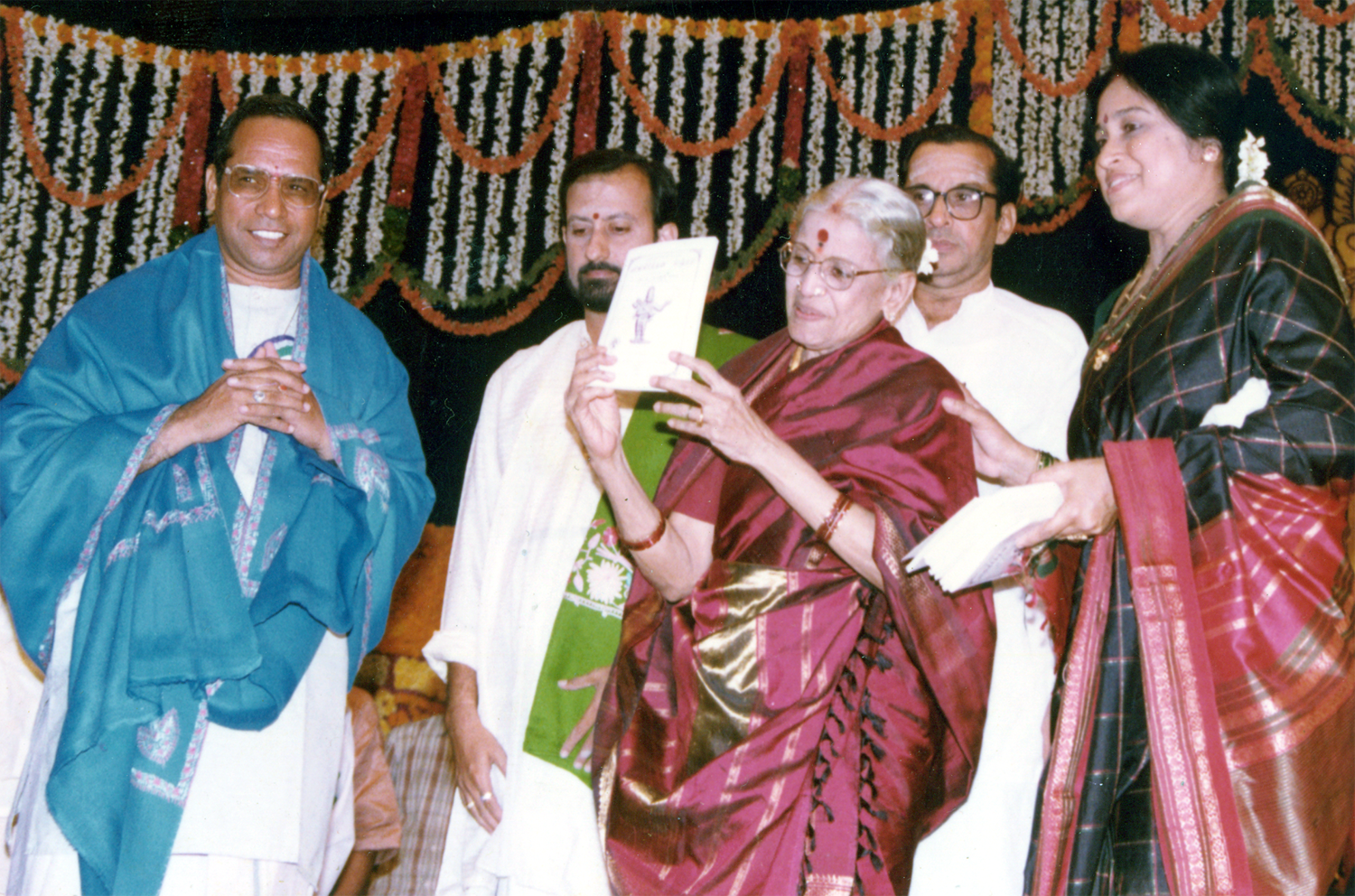
MS Subbalakshmi releasing Sri Balakrishna Prasad's Anjaneya Kritimani maala

== About Garimella Balakrishna Prasad's contribution to music ==
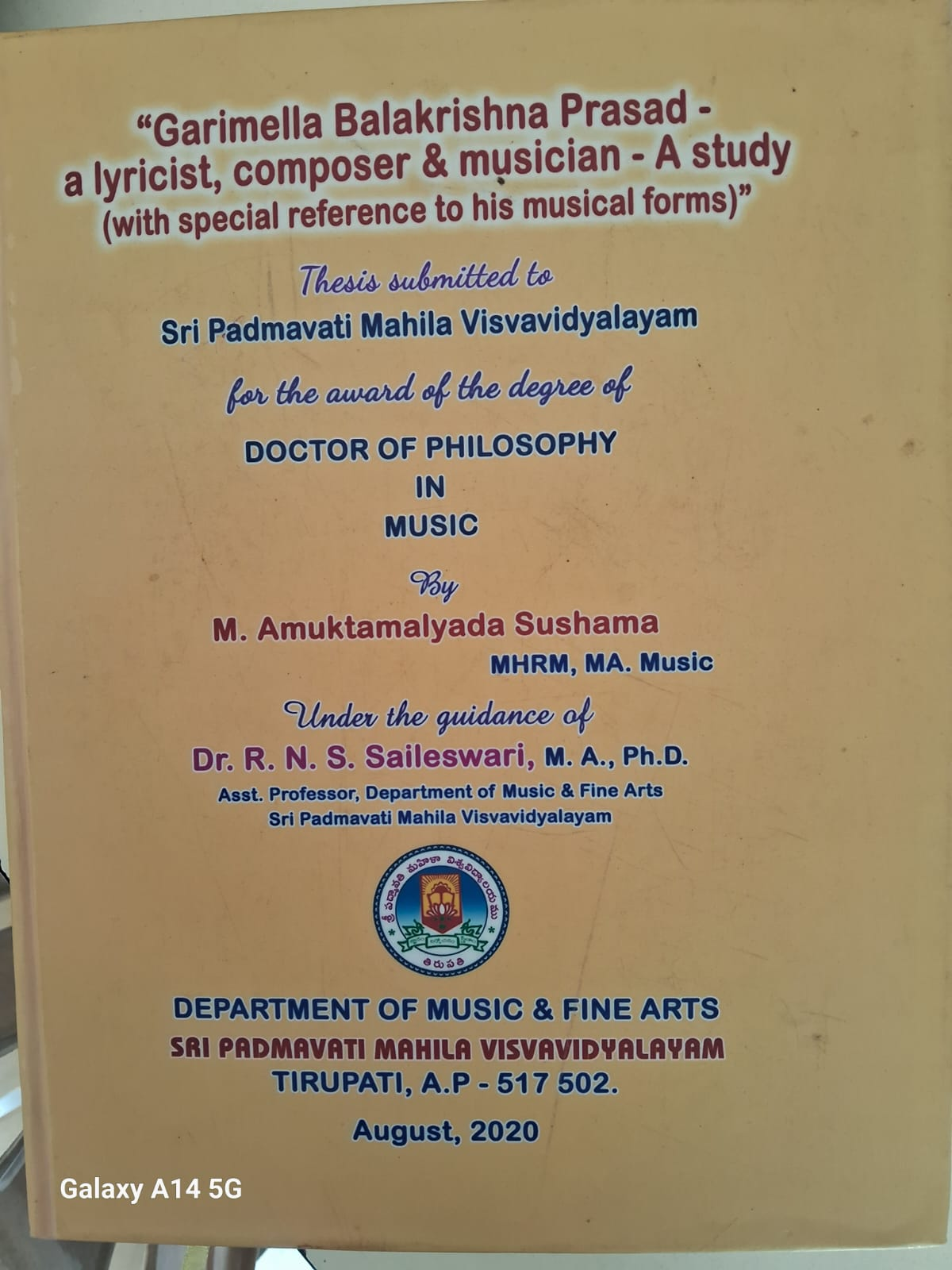
