= Sridevi Nrithyalaya =

Dance school in Saligramam, India

- SDN
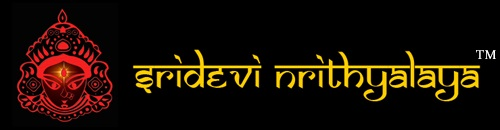

Location
- Saligramam, Chennai, India; 13.054531°N 80.2033138°E

Information
- Established: January 1987
- Founder: Sheela Unnikrishnan
- Director: Sheela Unnikrishnan

Sridevi Nrithyalaya is a dance school based in Chennai, Tamil Nadu. The school was founded in 1987 and operates as a trust. The main aim of the institution is to support and promote the southern Indian classical dance form Bharathanatayam. It specialises in Melattur style of Bharathanayam.

== Mission ==
Sridevi Nrityalaya specializes in the Melattur style of Bharatanatyam. This form of dance emphasizes on rich music and gives equal importance to nritta and nritya. It focuses on intricate jatis, controlled abhinaya and grace, where all the performers are taught to perform with confidence and ease.

Dr. Sheela Unnikrishnan is the founder-director of the Sridevi Nrithyalaya dance school. She is a renowned exponent of Bharatanatyam.

Other faculty of the school includes familiar dance artists including Harinie Jeevitha, Bhairavi Venkatesan, Kameshweri Ganesan, Mridula Sivakumar, Sanjena Ramesh and Smt. Shobha Korambil. Apart from Bharathanatyam, the institute also trains students in Carnatic music (available only to the regular performing artistes of Nrithyalaya), Thala-Laya classes, spiritual discourse sessions, Tamil literature classes and other relevant cultural classes.

In 2024 it had over 200 students enrolled for training.

The school focuses on the overall development of the student. Since the dancer has to be agile and flexible, stretching and other physical exercises go hand in hand with dance training in classes. This improves stamina of the dancer, which helps to hold the araimandi (Half sitting posture) for long and perform lengthy adavus (footwork).

The school and its founder Dr. Sheela Unnikrishnan organizes an annual dance festival titled 'Satyam Sivam Sundaram', where many artists, teachers and performers from all over India join its annual celebrations. This forms a platform for budding talents learning various classical dance forms of India.

The school has an ambition to rediscover the ancient art of Natya set forth in the Natya Shastra by making it more appealing to younger generations. The school is largely run by the contributions from students through fees, dance shows, patrons and from the Central Government grants through the Ministry of Culture.

== Notable works ==
Sridevi Nrithyalaya's artistic directors and the teachers have composed and choreographed several acclaimed original dance drama productions such as Srinivasa Kalyanam, Janani Jagathkarani, Sivamayam, Vande Mataram, Jaya Kalyana Krishnam, Sri Krishna Vaibhavam, Parvathi Parinayam, Bala Ramayanam, Sadaksharam, Nandanar Charithram, etc.

The school has also produced several thematic presentations. Param, Brahmasmi, Leela Taranga Margam, Nrithya Samkeerthanam, Kuralin Kural, Sri Krishna Manjari, Srikrishna Karnamrutham, Ramachandra Bhavayami, Shanmatham, Shodashi, Mahaperiyava Pancharathnam, Lava Kusa, Vande Shambhum, Oothukkadu Saptaratham are a few in this category.

- Param a thematic Margam review by The Hindu.
- LalithaSai reviews the ballet dance Janani Jagath Karani.
- The school has proven that the training and adherence to the heritage form the key to the visual spectacle.
1. The following is a review by Chitra Mahesh in The Hindu on Sivamayam : A spectacle all the way:.
2. Another article in the Indian Express also reviews the spectacle of Sivamayam dance drama:.
- All for the Love of Dance by Narayana Vishwanath in the Indian Express highlights the under-current.
- This news article in The Hindu newspaper highlights students who learnt Melattur dance style receiving scholarships.
- The many facets of Krishna
- The school and their teachers are published in several of the local Tamil language news dailies and monthlies such as Dina malar and Mangayar malar. The school is also featured in adjacent state news papers including Eenadu in Andhra Pradesh, and in Kerala. Dinamalar; Dinamalar; Dinamalar; Arcot Road Times.
- A few of the Sridevi Nrithyalaya students have received prestigious Balasree awards, a national level award
- Sheela Unnikrishnan's prime disciple and Sridevi Nrithyalaya's faculty Harinie Jeevitha and Bhairavi Venkateshan were featured in The Hindu.

Sridevi Nrithyalaya is launching a new dance musical along with Kuldeep M Pai digitally in its YouTube sheelaunni on 25/11/2015 on the auspicious Thiruvannamalai Deepam.

SDN had their first US tour from August 17, 2024 to September 29, 2024 in San Jose, Washington DC, Dallas, Connecticut, Boston, New Jersey, Chicago, New York, and finally Portland. They performed the programs: Melattur Margam, Natyam, and Thyagaraja Vaibhavam. In some cities they also conducted workshops for students.
