= Rahul Vellal =

Musician

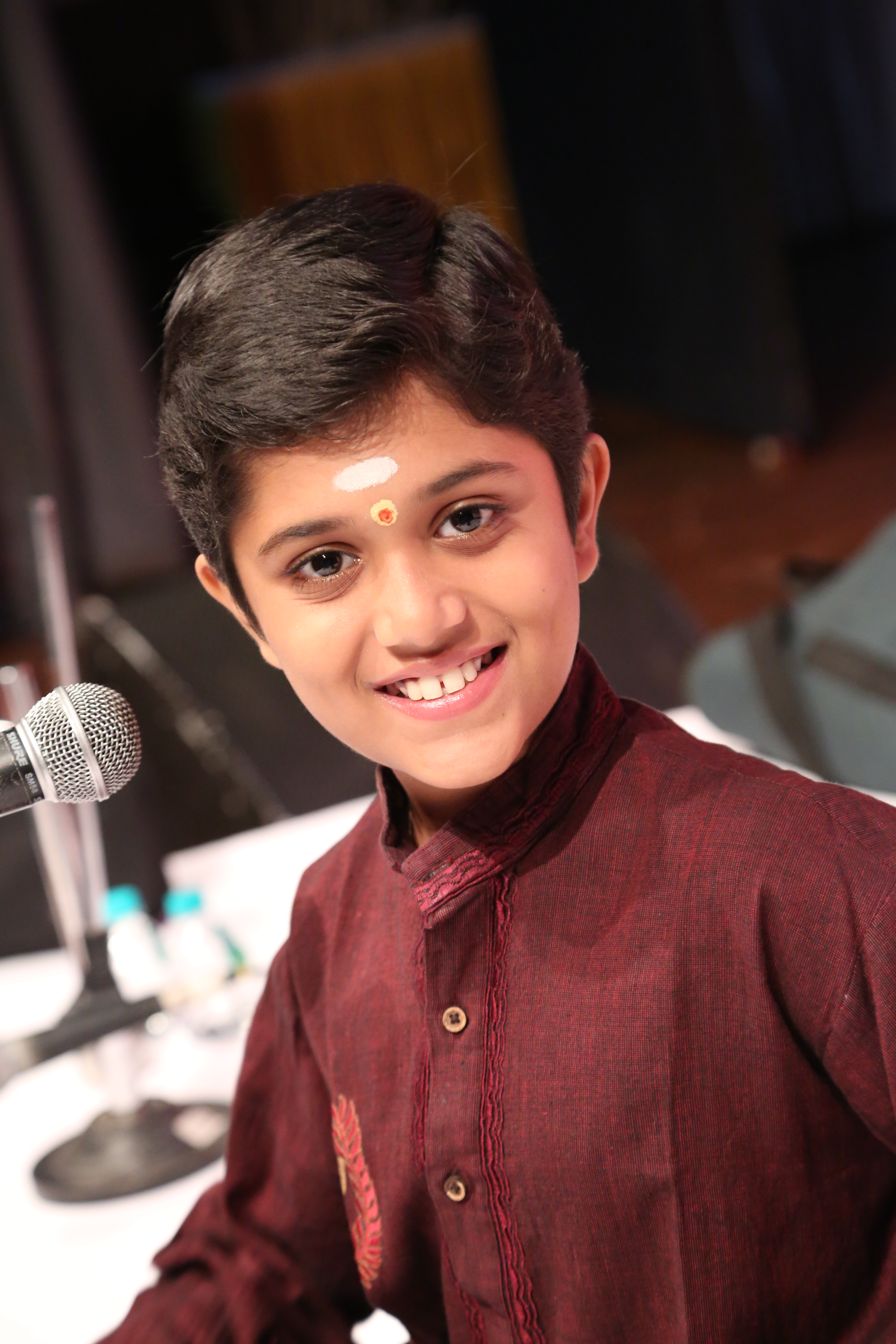
- Born: 23 June 2007 (age 19); Bengaluru, Karnataka, India
- Occupation: Singer (Carnatic Music)
- Parents: Sri. Ravishankar Vellal (father); Smt. Hema Suryanarayana (mother)
- Website: http://rahulvellal.me/

Rahul R. Vellal (/rɑːhʊlvɛllɑːl/) is a singer and musician from Bengaluru, India. He started learning Carnatic Music at the age of 4. He is known for playing concerts at several locations across India and other countries, He has studied under Suchethan Rangaswamy and Ranjani–Gayatri. He became widely known through Kuldeep Pai's YouTube series "Vande Guru Paramparaam". In October 2023 he was among the vocalists at MS Forever, a tribute to M. S. Subbulakshmi at the Music Academy, Chennai.

== Awards and accolades ==
- Shanmukhananda M S Subbulakshmi Fellowship 2018 presented by Venkaiah Naidu, September 2018.
- RISING STAR award from LIVING, November 2018
- "Change Maker 2022" award from Deccan Herald.
- Featured in season 2 of News18's BYJU'S Young Genius (January 2022).
