= Tallapaka, Andhra Pradesh =

Tallapaka
- Village
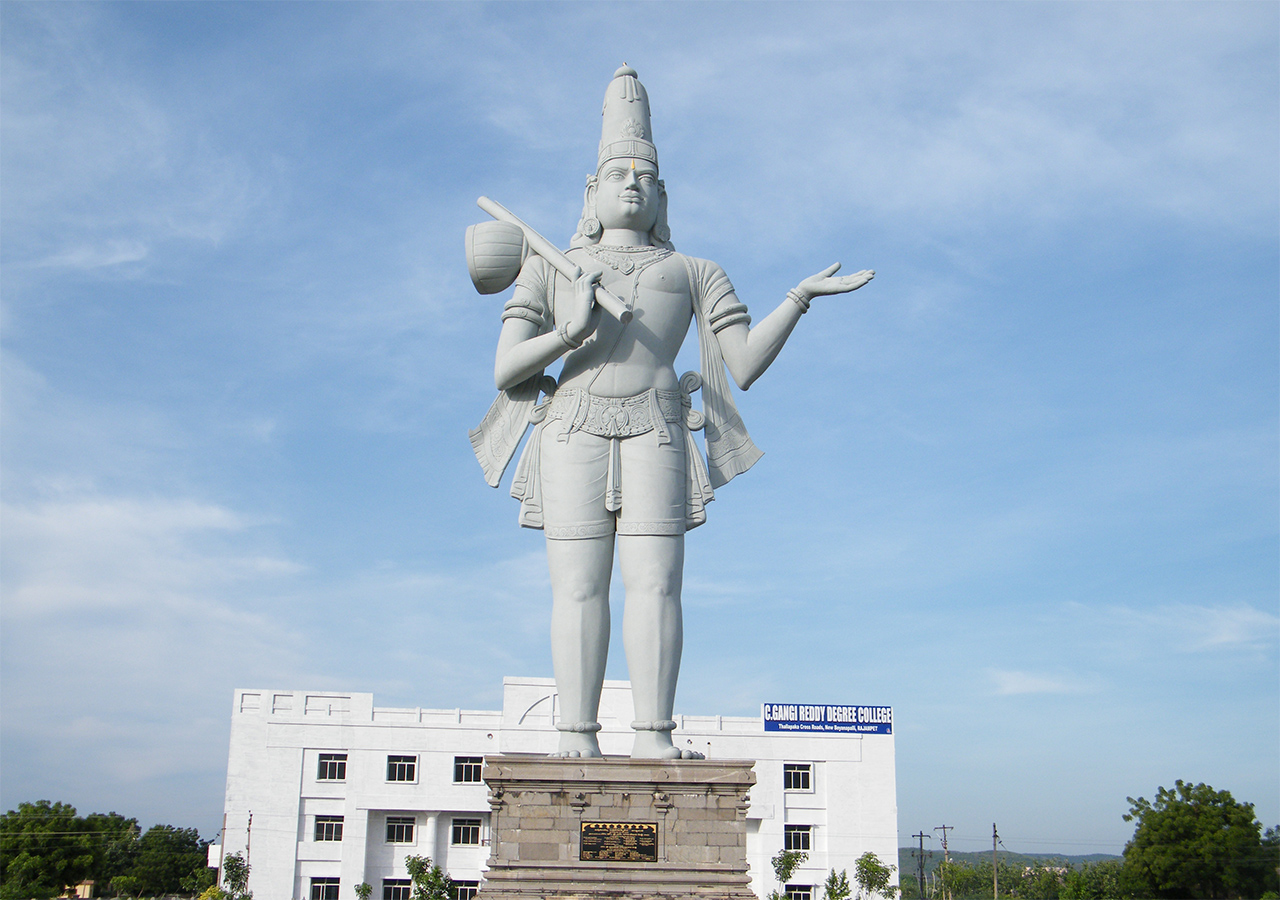
- 10-story statue of Sri Tallapaka Annamacharya located at the entrance of Tallapaka

- Location in Andhra Pradesh, India
- Coordinates: 14°14′08″N 79°08′59″E
- Country: India
- State: Andhra Pradesh
- District: Kadapa district
- Mandal: Rajampet

Languages
  - Official: Telugu
- Time zone: UTC+5:30 (IST)
- Vehicle registration: AP

Tallapaka is a village in Rajampet mandal of Kadapa district in the Indian state of Andhra Pradesh. It is located 63 kms from Rayachoti and renowned as the birthplace of Tallapaka Annamacharya. Once the village was patronised as the living abode of Lord Venkateswara. Dr. Balaraju Krishnam Raju developed this village as a tourist location.

== Population ==
As of 2011 Census of India, it had population of 7,658 with 1,834 households. It includes 3,862 males and 3.796 females and 906 in the age group of 0–6 years.
