= Melattur style =

The Melattur style of Bharatanatyam dance was developed largely out of the devadasi traditions and Melattur Bhagavata Mela by Mangudi Dorairaja Iyer (1900–1980), a sanyasi following Srividya Upasana.

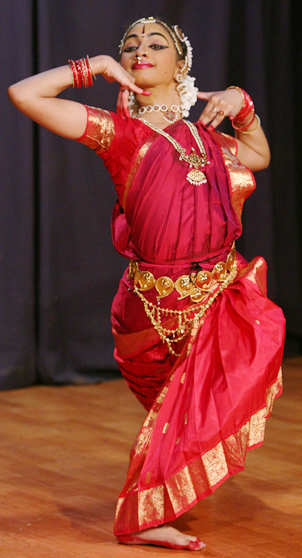
Harinie Jeevitha - A Bharatanatyam dancer of the Melattur style

He re-established the Suddha Nrittam from kuchipudi(intricate tapping footwork that explores different time measures in different tempos), Bhattasa Natyam and Perani Natyam (dance on the clay pot). Mangudi became interested in Shuddha Nrittam after watching a performance by devadasi of Cheyyur Sengalvarayar temple, who performed it along with other 71 types of items (e.g. Kavita, Nritta, Vadya, Sangeeta and others).

== Themes ==
Unlike other Bharatanatyam gurus, Mangudi avoided the items which glorified the poet's human patrons, as performing such items would be inconsistent with his adherence to spiritual practices of Srividya Upasana. It is only the deities or the great rishis who were deemed worthy of such glorification. Thus, the repertoire of a Melattur style dancer consists mostly of the ancient items performed in the temples.

== Footwork ==
The Melattur style discourages stamping the feet hard against the floor. Instead, the dancer is expected to use the salangai (ankle bells) in a more sophisticated manner that produces a richer variety of sounds and highlights the rhythm.

Another distinctive feature is the presence of pancha nadais and extensive use of gati bhedas. For instance in varnam there would be gati bhedam in every jati. There is a special emphasis on crisp adavus, fluid variations or patterned korvais.

== Abhinaya ==
Due to the Melattur Bhagavata Mela influence, the style makes extensive use of the dramatic elements, i.e. characterisation, which requires highly expressive and intricate abhinaya. Unlike other Bharatanatyam styles, the facial expressions in of the Melattur style dancer are not rigidly defined, are neither theatrical nor understated, which requires a high degree of introspection and individual improvisation. Due to the devadasi influence, there is an emphasis on sringara rasa, rather than on a neutral bhakti.

The nritta abhinaya is different from most other styles in the sense that each body movement is to be reflected in a different facial expression in a spontaneous manner.

== Other distinctive features ==
- The dance movements are supposed to be performed with a larger amplitude on a wide scale of tempos, making it physically the most demanding style of Bharatanatyam.
- The application of loka dharmi and natya dharmi is different from other Bharatanatyam styles.
- The Melattur style dancers wear a special protective cotton belt around their waist.
