= Zamorin =

Hereditary king of kingdom of Calicut (1124–1806)

Zamorin of Calicut
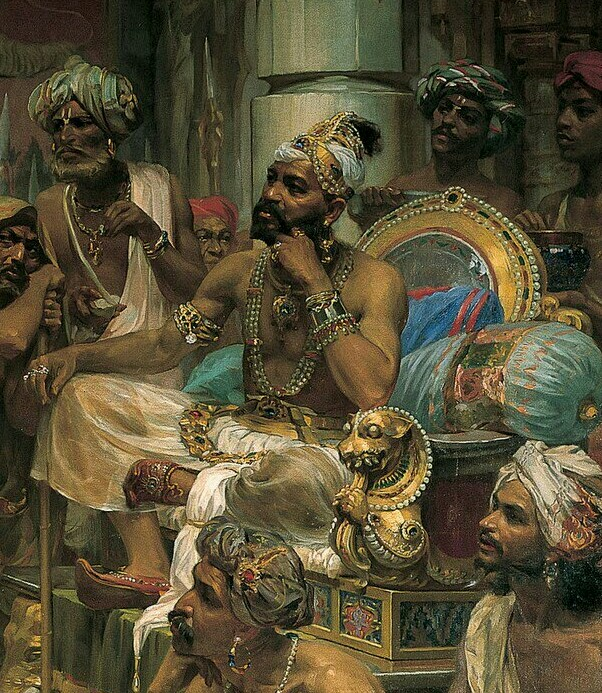
- The Zamorin of Calicut (1495–1500) on his throne as painted by Veloso Salgado in 1898

Details
- First monarch: Mana Vikrama
- Last monarch: Krishna Varma
- Formed: 1124
- Abolished: 1806

The Samoothiri (Anglicised as Zamorin; Malayalam: sāmūtiri, sāmūri, [saːmuː(d̪i)ɾi,], Arabic: sāmuri, Portuguese: Samorim, Dutch: Samorijn, Chinese: Shamitihsi) was the title of the erstwhile ruler and monarch of the Calicut kingdom in the South Malabar region of India. Originating from the former feudal kingdom of Nediyiruppu Swaroopam, the Samoothiris and their vassal kings from Nilambur Kovilakam established Calicut as one of the most important trading ports on the southwest coast of India. The Samoothiris belonged to the Eradi subcaste of the Samantan community of colonial Kerala, and were originally the ruling chiefs of Eranad. The final Zamorin of Calicut committed suicide by setting fire to his palace and burning himself alive inside it, upon learning that Hyder Ali had captured the neighboring country of Chirakkal in Kannur.

== Etymology ==
Major locations associated with the history of the Kingdom of Calicut

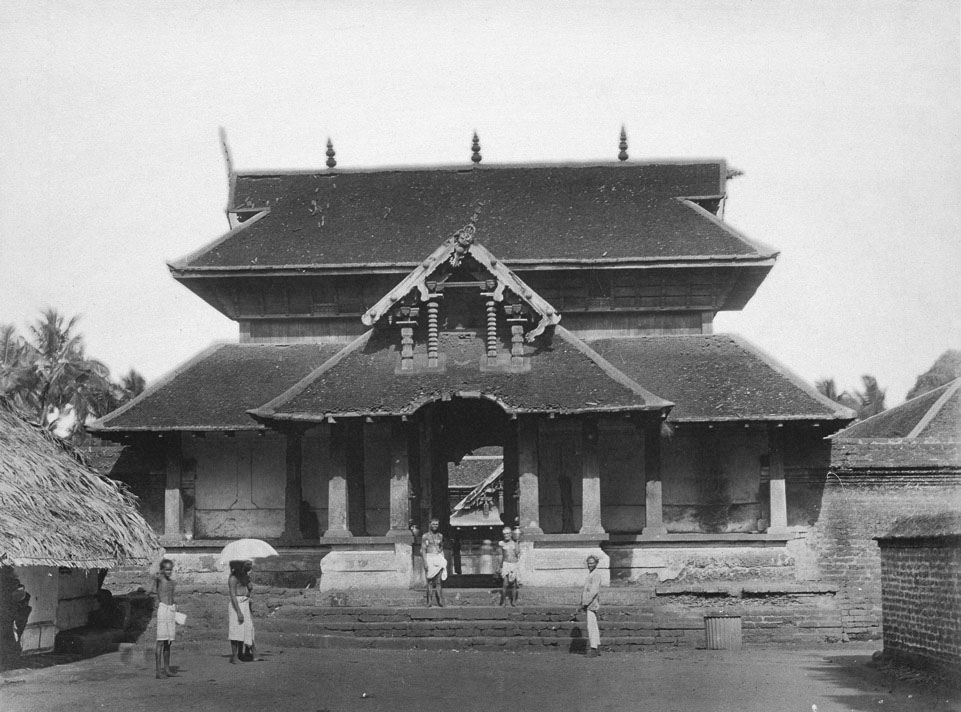
Thali Temple (1901), Calicut

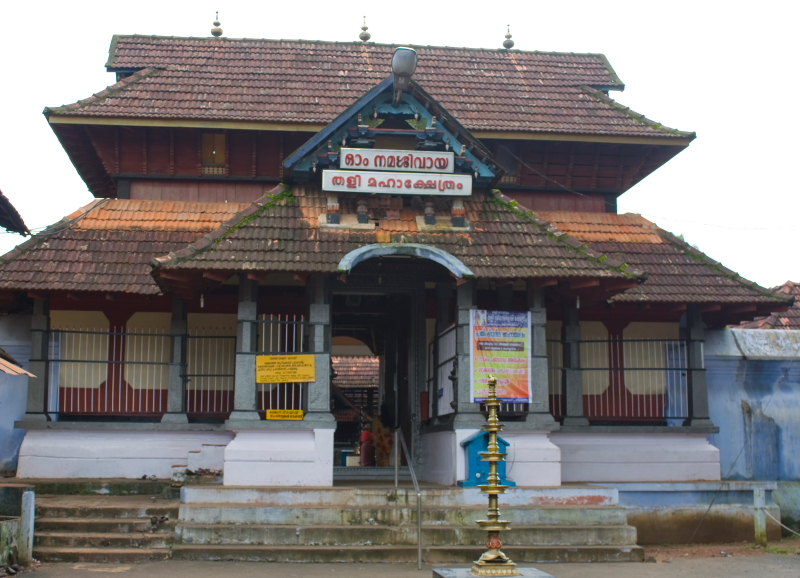
Thali Temple, present day, Kozhikode

The title zamorin first appears in the writings of Ibn Battuta in 1342. In the Portuguese Book of Duarte Barbosa (c. 1516), the title of the ruler of Calicut is given as çamidre or zomodri, derived from the local Malayalam sāmūtiri. In Tuhfat Ul Mujahideen written by Zainuddin Makhdoom II in the 16th century CE, the word is pronounced as Sāmuri. This was once thought to be derived from Sanskrit samudra ("sea") and have the meaning "lord of the sea". In fact, the term derives from Sanskrit svami and sri (which in combined form becomes tiri), which Krishna Iyer glosses as "emperor". He gives the complete title as Svami Tiri Tirumulapad ("august emperor").

The Zamorins used the title Punturakkon or Punthurakon (Victor/Lord of Punthura?) in inscriptions from c. 1100, in palace records known as the Granthavaris, and in official treaties with the English and the Dutch. No records indicate the actual personal name of the ruler. Punthura may be the place of their origin, or a battle-field, or a port of great fame. The title "Kunnalakkon" ("Lord of Hills and Waves") and its Sanskrit form "Shailabdhishvara" are mostly found in later literary works (such as Manipravalam and Sanskrit poems).

== Seats of power ==
Thrikkavil Kovilakam in Ponnani served as a second home for the Zamorins of Calicut. Other secondary seats of the Zamorin of Calicut, all established at a much later time, were Trichur (Thrissur) and Cranganore (Kodungallur). The 147th Samoothiri Raja, Sree Manavedan Raja, who was married to Bharathy Thamburatty from Nilambur Kovilakam, became the last Zamorin in the dynasty's 682-year history to hold power over the Guruvayur Temple.

The chief Kerala ports under control of the Zamorins in the late 15th century were Panthalayini Kollam, and Calicut. The Zamorin of Calicut derived a greater part of his revenues by taxing the spice trade through his ports. Smaller ports in the kingdom were Puthuppattanam (Kottakkal), Parappanangadi, Tanur (Tanore), Ponnani (Ponani), Chetuva (Chetwai) and Kodungallur (Cranganore). The port of Beypore served as a ship building center.

=== Calicut ===
- The port at Calicut held the superior economic and political position in Kerala, while Kollam (Quilon), Kochi and Kannur (Cannanore) were commercially confined to secondary roles. Travellers have called the city by different names – variations of the Malayalam name. The travellers from Middle-East called it "Kalikooth", Tamils called the city "Kallikkottai", for the Chinese it was "Kalifo" or "Quli".
- In the Middle Ages, Calicut was dubbed the "City of Spices" for its role as the major trading point of Asian spices. The Chinese and Middle-Eastern interests in Malabar, the political ambition of the newly emergent rulers, i.e., the Zamorins, and the decline of port Kodungallur (c. 1341), etc. boosted the prosperity of the port. The rise of Calicut, both the port and the state, seems to have taken place only after the 13th century.
- Calicut, despite being located at a geographically inconvenient spot, owed much of its prosperity to the economic policies of the Zamorins of Calicut.
- Trade at port Calicut was managed by the Muslim port commissioner known as the Shah Bandar Koya. The port commissioner supervised the customs on the behalf of the king, fixed the prices of the commodities and collected the share to the Calicut treasury.
- The name of the famous fine variety of cotton cloth called calico is also thought to have derived from Calicut.

=== Panthalayini Kollam ===
- Also known as "Fandarina" (Ibn Batutah), and "Shaojunan" (Daoyi Zgilue).
- Located north of Calicut, close to a bay. The geographical location is ideal for the wintering of ships during the annual monsoon rains.
- Presence of Chetti, Arab and Jewish merchants among others.

== Caste and line of succession ==
According to K. V. Krishna Iyer, the court historian in Calicut, the members of the royal house of Zamorin belonged to the Eradi subcaste of the Samanthan section of Nair aristocracy. The Samantas claimed a status higher than the rest of the Nairs. The Hindu theological formula that the rulers must be of Kshatriya varna may have been a complication for the Samantas of the Kodungallur Chera monarch. So the Samantas – already crystallized as a distinctive social group, something of a "sub-caste" – began to style themselves as "Samantha Kshatriyas". The Samantas have birth, marriage and death customs identical to other Nair communities.

The Zamorin follows a matriarchal system where the present king's sister's son becomes the next king. The direct sisters of the Zamorin are always married to Nambudiri Brahmin men. Consequently, the Zamorin's King's lineage was always half Zamorin and half Nambudiri Brahmin.

In the royal family, thalis of the princesses were usually tied by Kshatriyas from Kodungallur chief's family, which the Zamorin recognised as more ancient and therefore higher rank. The women's sambandham partners were Nambudiri Brahmins or Kshatriyas. Royal men married Samantan or other Nair women. Zamorin's consort was dignified by the title "Naittiyar".

The family of chieftains that ruled the polities in premodern Kerala was known as the swaroopam. The rulers of Calicut belonged to "Nediyirippu swaroopam" and followed matriliny system of inheritance. The eldest male member of Nediyirippu swaroopam became the Zamorin of Calicut. There was a set pattern of succession, indicated by sthanams in the royal line. Five sthanams were defined in Calicut. These positions were based on the chronological seniority of the incumbent in the different thavazhis of the swaroopam and constituted what is called in the records as "kuruvazhcha". Unlike in the case of Cochin (Kochi), there was no rotation of position among the thavazhis. Thus no particular thavazhi enjoyed any privilege or precedence in the matter of succession, as the only criterion for succession was seniority of age.

Five sthanams existed in Calicut, each with its own separate property enjoyed in succession by the senior members of the three kovilakams of the family:

- 1st sthanam: the Zamorin of Calicut
- 2nd sthanam: Eranadu Ilamkur Nambiyathiri Thirumulpadu (the Eralppadu). Second in line successor to the throne. Eralppadu's seat was in Karimpuzha (in the northeastern region of the present-day Palakkad district). This area of Malabar was annexed from Valluvanadu in the leadership of the then Eralppadu.
- 3rd sthanam: Eranadu Moonnamkur Nambiyathiri Thirumulpad (the Munalpadu)
- 4th sthanam: Edattaranadu Nambiyathiri Thirumulpadu (the Etatralpadu) – mentioned in the Manjeri Pulapatta inscription as the overlord of the "Three Hundred" Nairs. The Etatralpadu used to reside in a palace at Edattara near Manjeri.
- 5th sthanam: Nediyiruppu Mootta Eradi Thirumulpadu (the Naduralpadu). Naduralpadu was the former head of the house (Eranadu chief under the Cheras of Kodungallur).

The three thavazhis were:

1. Kizhakke Kovilakam (Eastern Branch)
2. Padinhare Kovilakam (Western Branch)
3. Puthiya Kovilakam (New Branch)

The senior female member of the whole Zamorin family, the Valiya Thamburatti, also enjoyed a sthanam with separate property known as the Ambadi Kovilakam. Women were not allowed to be the ruler of Calicut. And so the oldest male member traced became the next Zamorin.

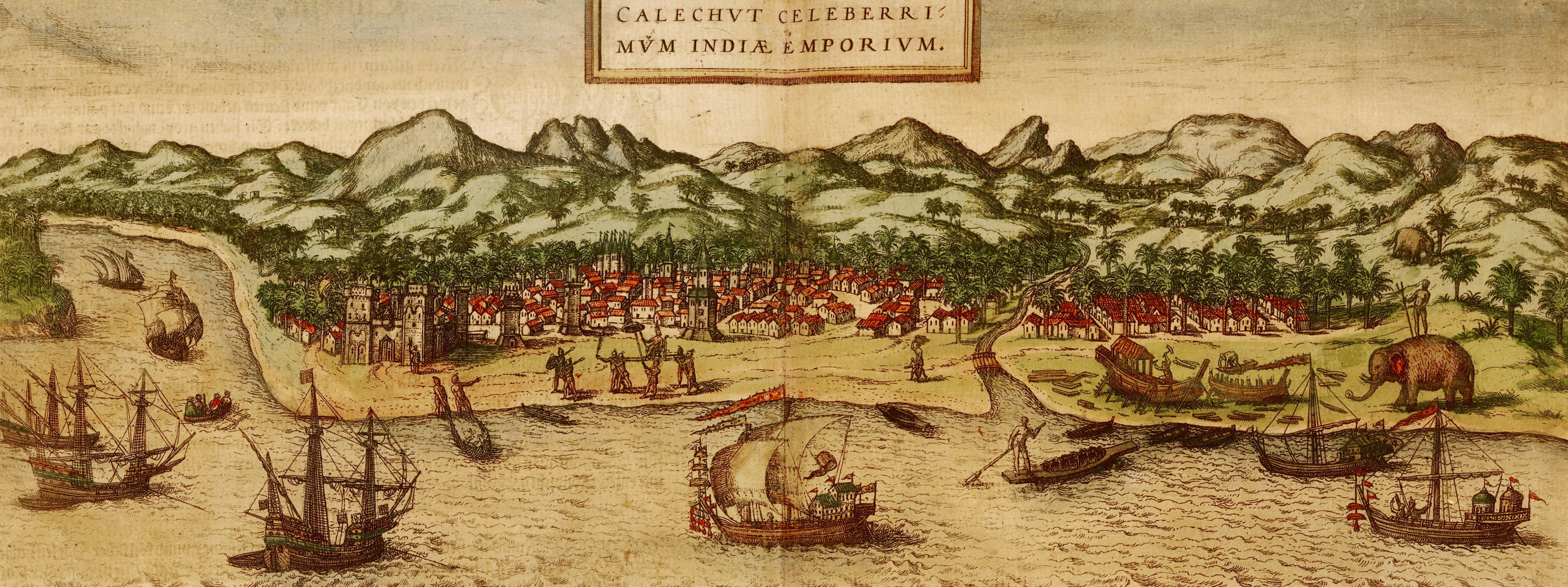
A panorama of port Calicut, shows several types of ships, shipbuilding, net fishing, dinghy traffic and a rugged, sparsely populated interior (Georg Braun and Franz Hogenbergs atlas Civitates orbis terrarum, 1572).

== Historical overview ==
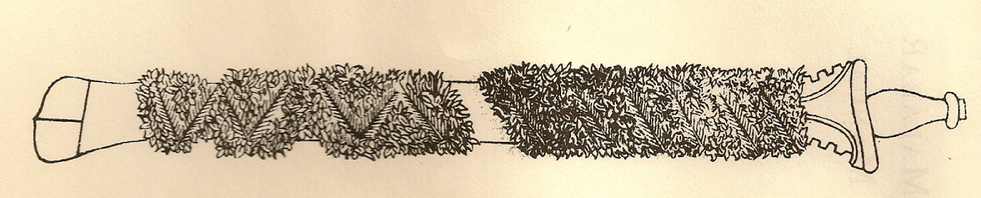
Portrait of the sword of Zamorins of Kozhikode, which is related to the Legend of Cheraman Perumals.

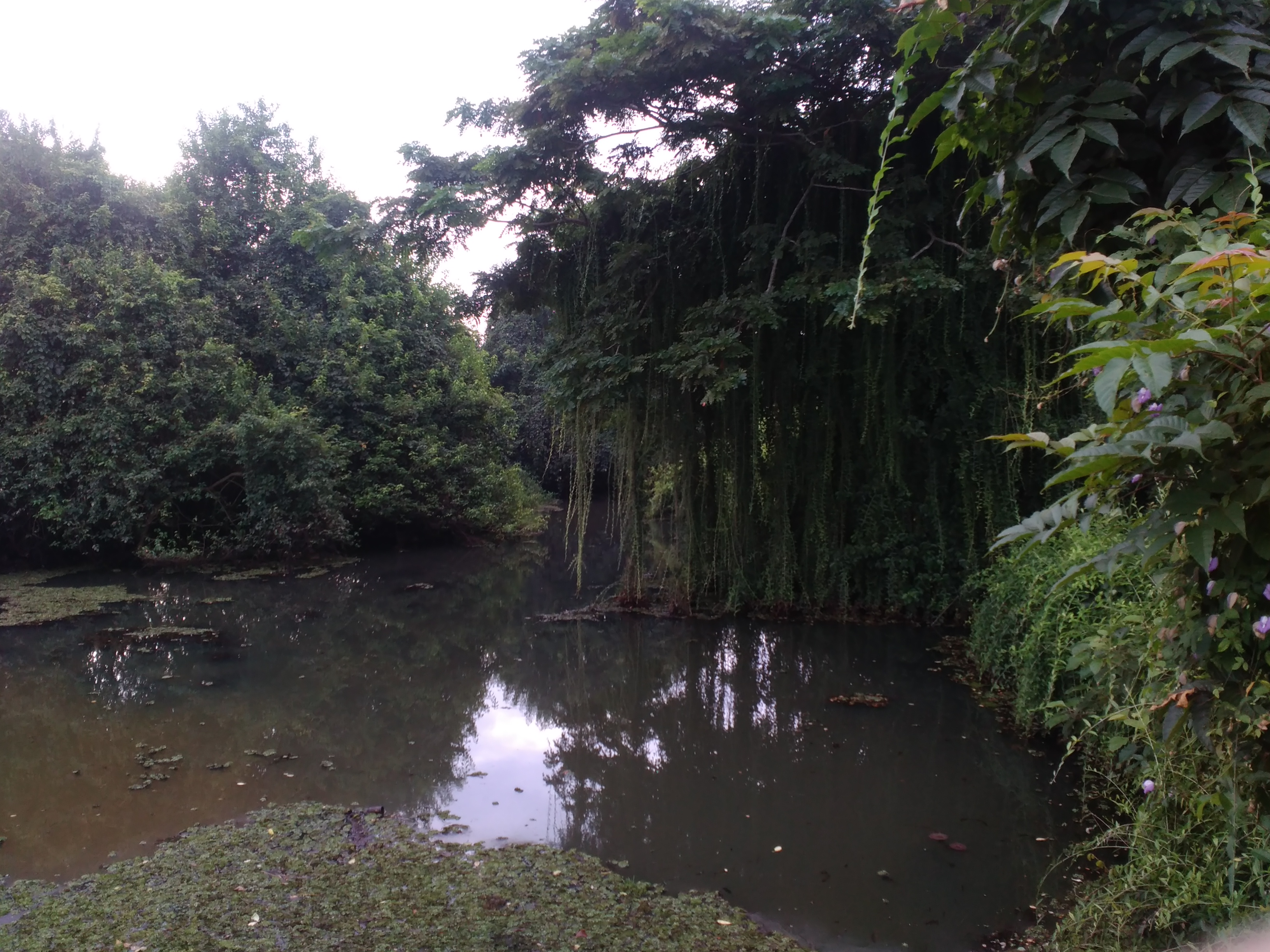
The Chera king granted the Eradi warrior, as a mark of favour, a small tract of land ("Kozhikode and Chullikkadu").

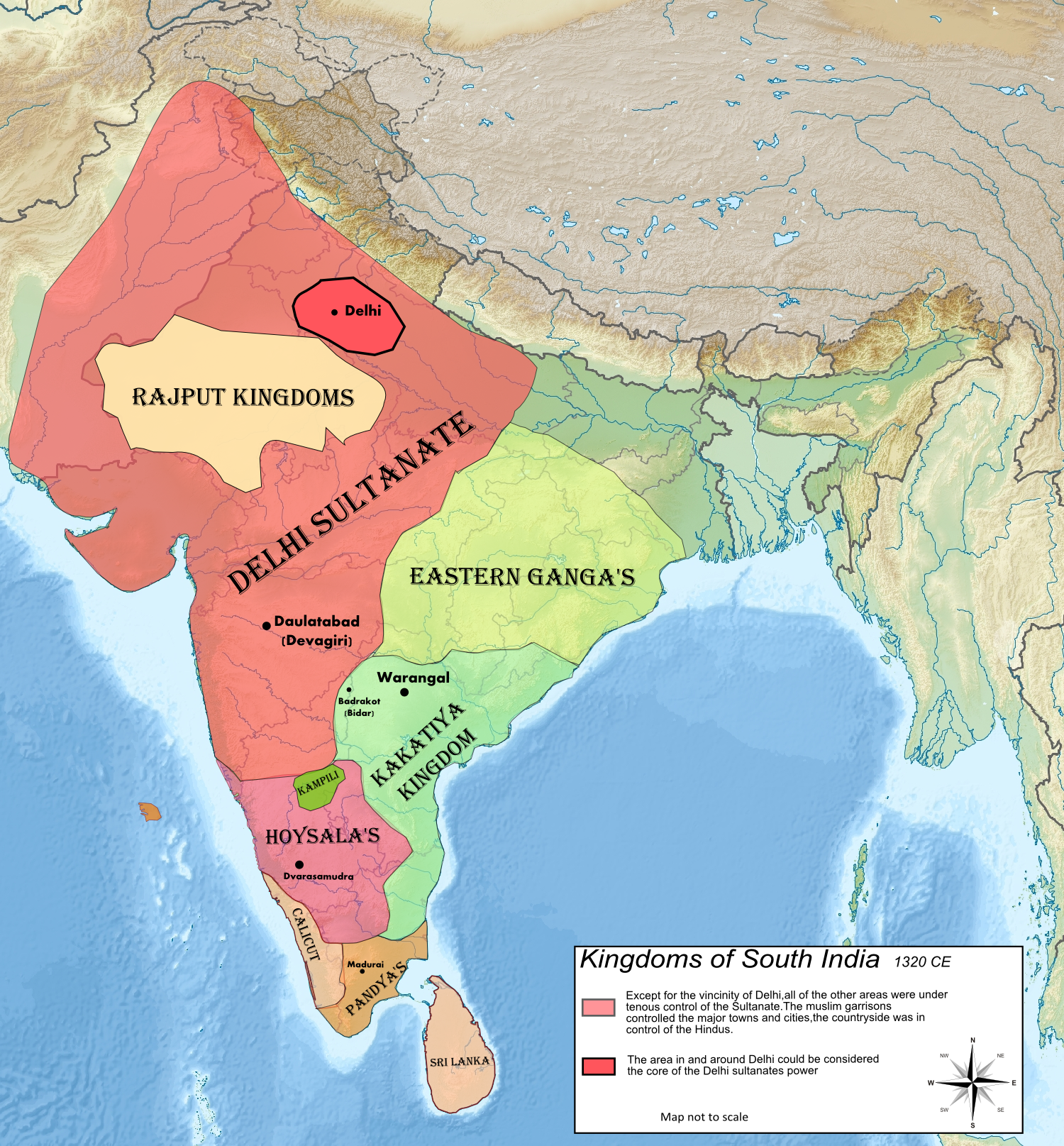
India in early 1320. Note that most of the parts of present-day state of Kerala was under the sovereignty of the Zamorin of Kozhikode.

Brahmanic legends such as the Keralolpathi (compiled in its final form c. 17th – 18 century) and the Calicut Granthavari recount the events leading to the establishment of the state of Calicut.

There were two brothers belonging to the Eradi ruling family at Nediyiruppu. The brothers Manichan and Vikraman were the most trusted warriors in the militia of the Kodungallur Cheras. They distinguished themselves in the battles against the foreigners. However, during the partition of Chera kingdom, the Chera monarch failed to allocate any land to Nediyiruppu. Filled with guilt, the king later gave an unwanted piece of marshy tract of land called Kozhikode to the younger brother Vikraman (the elder brother died in the battle). The king also gifted his personal sword and his favourite prayer conch – both broken – to him and told him to occupy as much as land as he could with all his might. So the Eradis conquered neighbouring kingdoms and created a large state for themselves. As a token of their respect to the Chera king, they adopted the logo of two crossed swords, with a broken conch in the middle and a lighted lamp above it.

The port at Kozhikode held the superior economic and political position along the medieval Kerala coastline, while Kannur, Kollam, and Kochi, were commercially important secondary ports, where traders from various parts of the world would gather. The Portuguese navigator Vasco da Gama visited Quilandy (Koyilandy) in 1498, opening the sailing route directly from Europe to South Asia. The port at Kozhikode acted as the gateway to medieval South Indian coast for the Arabs, the Chinese, the Portuguese, the Dutch, and finally the British. The Portuguese efforts to lay the foundations to Estado da Índia, and to take complete control over the commerce was repeatedly hampered by the forces of the Zamorin of Calicut. The Kunjali Marakkars, the famous Muslim warriors, were the admiral of the fleet of Calicut. By the end of the 16th century the Portuguese – now commanding the spice traffic on the Malabar Coast – had succeeded in replacing the Muslim merchants in the Arabian Sea. The Dutch supplanted the Portuguese in the 17th century, who in turn were supplanted by the British.

Travancore became the most dominant state in Kerala by defeating the powerful Zamorin of Calicut in a battle located in Purakkad in 1755. In 1766, Haider Ali of Mysore defeated the Zamorin of Calicut and absorbed Calicut to his state. After the Third Anglo-Mysore War (1790–1792), Malabar District including Zamorin's former territories were placed under the control of the East India Company. Eventually, the status of the Zamorin was reduced to that of a pensioner of the company by 1806.

== Origins and early history ==
=== Rulers of Eranadu ===
Historical records regarding the origin of the Zamorin of Calicut are obscure. However, it is generally agreed among historians the Eradis were originally the autonomous rulers of the Eranadu region of the Kodungallur Chera kingdom. The Kodungallur Chera kingdom was a congeries of chiefdoms, which were ruled by local chiefs. The office of the chief/senior prince of Eranad (Eralanadu Utaya) is assumed to be hereditary. The earliest reference to the chief and chiefdom of Eranad is the Cochin Jewish copper plate (c. 1000). Old Malayalam inscriptions name two titles for the rulers of Eranad – Manvepala Manaviyata (c. 11 century) and Manavikrama (c. 12th century). In the later period, Manavikrama, Manaveda and Viraraya were the only names given to male members in the royal family, the Zamorin always being known as Manavikrama. Historians assume that Manaveda might be a corruption of the old Malayalam title "Manaviyata". Scholars tentatively identify Manaviyata and Manavikrama with the titles of the elder and younger brothers of the famous origin legend.

The strength of the "Hundred Organisation" of the senior prince of Eranadu was "Six Hundred". Several organisations with same capacity are also found in Ramavalanadu, Valluvanadu, Kizhmalanadu and Venadu. Scholars come across only one nadu with a stronger force, namely Kurumpuranadu, with a force of Seven Hundred although many lesser ones with Five Hundred of Purakizhanadu, Three Hundred of Nantuzhanadu and others.

The following table shows available inscriptions mentioning the rulers of Eranad:

Inscription	Year	Notes
Cochin Jewish copper plate of Kodungallur Chera king Bhaskara Ravi (c. 962–1021)	c. 1000	An old Malayalam royal charter in Vattezhuthu and Grantha scripts. Among others, the chief of Eralanadu, Eralanadu Utaya "Manavepala Mana Viyatan", is a signatory in the charter. As per the charter, while residing at Chera capital Kodungallur, king Bhaskara Ravi granted Jewish merchant Joseph Rabban a plate giving him the proprietorship of the merchant guild Anchuvannam and other 72 special trade privileges. Rabban was also exempted from all payments made by other settlers in the town to the king, and in-turn, all the rights of other settlers in the town were extended to him. The document was attested by the chief feudatories of the Chera king – Govardhana Marthanda (Venadu), Kotha Chirikanthan (Venpalinadu), Manavepala Mana Viyatan (Eralanadu), Rayiran Chathan (Valluvanadu), Kotha Ravi (Netumpurayur-nadu) – and Murkan Chathan the commander of the eastern forces. Anchuvannam was a merchant guild in Kerala organised by Jewish, Christian and Muslim merchants from the Middle East.
Kollam Rameshwaram temple inscription of Kodungallur Chera king Ramavarma Kulasekhara (c. 1089 – 1122)	1102	An old Malayalam royal order in Vattezhuthu and Grantha scripts. The Chera king Rama Kulasekhara, residing at Kollam, sitting in royal council with Arya Brahmins of the temple, the Four Brahmin Ministers, the Leader of the Thousand Nairs, the Leader of the Six Hundred Nairs of Venadu, Punthurakkon Manavikrama – the chief of Eranadu, and other feudatories, made amends for (some) offence against the Arya Brahmins by donating paddy for daily feeding the Brahmins and leasing out a Cherikkal for that purpose to Venadu chief Kumara Udaya Varma.
Anandapuram temple inscription, Thrissur	Immediate post-Chera Period	A temple inscription recording a resolution of the village council (Urutayavai) of Karimukku. The council prescribed a punishment for those who obstructed the Anandapuram temple functionaries or pilfered away temple properties and prevented the temple rituals. In addition to paying a fine, the offenders would forfeit their place in the assembly and their right to protection from the Eranadu Nizhal (warriors).
Trichambaram temple inscription	Undated (c. 11th century)	An old Malayalam inscription in Vattezhuthu and Grantha scripts. The chief of Eranadu Manavepala Mana Viyatan creates an endowment for Tiruvilakku at Trichambaram temple.
Pulpatta temple inscription, Manjeri	Undated (c. 11th century)	An old Malayalam temple inscription in Vattezhuthu and Grantha scripts. The Six Hundred of Eralanadu and the Three Hundred of Etattirai Nadu, among others, make provision for "uttu" by assigning land to the Pulpatta temple. Fine is prescribed for the violation of the rules. The Uralar are authorised to take over from Pattavalan (officer in charge of collection) in case of obstruction.
Syrian Christian copper plates of Viraraghava	1225	The plates records the grant of certain privileges, concessions and monopolies to Iravi Korthan, the chief of merchant guild Manigramam in Kodungallur. It closes with the statement that it was "issued with the knowledge of Venadu, Odanadu, Eranadu and Valluvanadu" Manigramam was a famous merchant guild (active in southern India and south-east Asia) organised by native Indians.
Muchundi mosque inscription of Punthurakkon	13th century	An old Malayalam – Arabic stone inscription in Vattezhuthu and Arabic. Punthurakkon (ruler of Eranad) creates an endowment for the Muchundi Mosque. As per the Arabic portion certain Shihab-ud-Din Raihan – a freed slave (atiq) of late Mas'ud – purchased land and constructed the mosque.

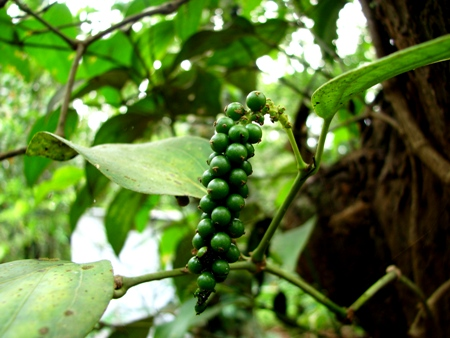
Pepper

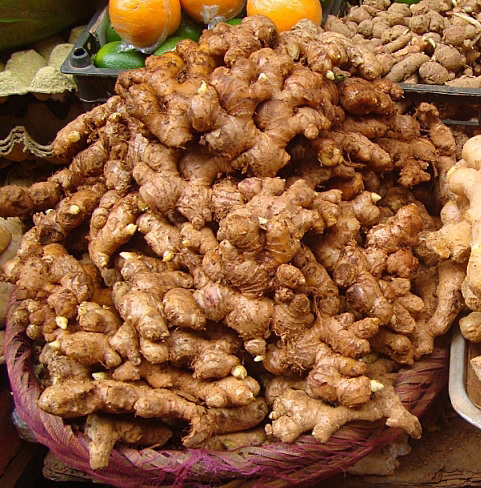
Ginger

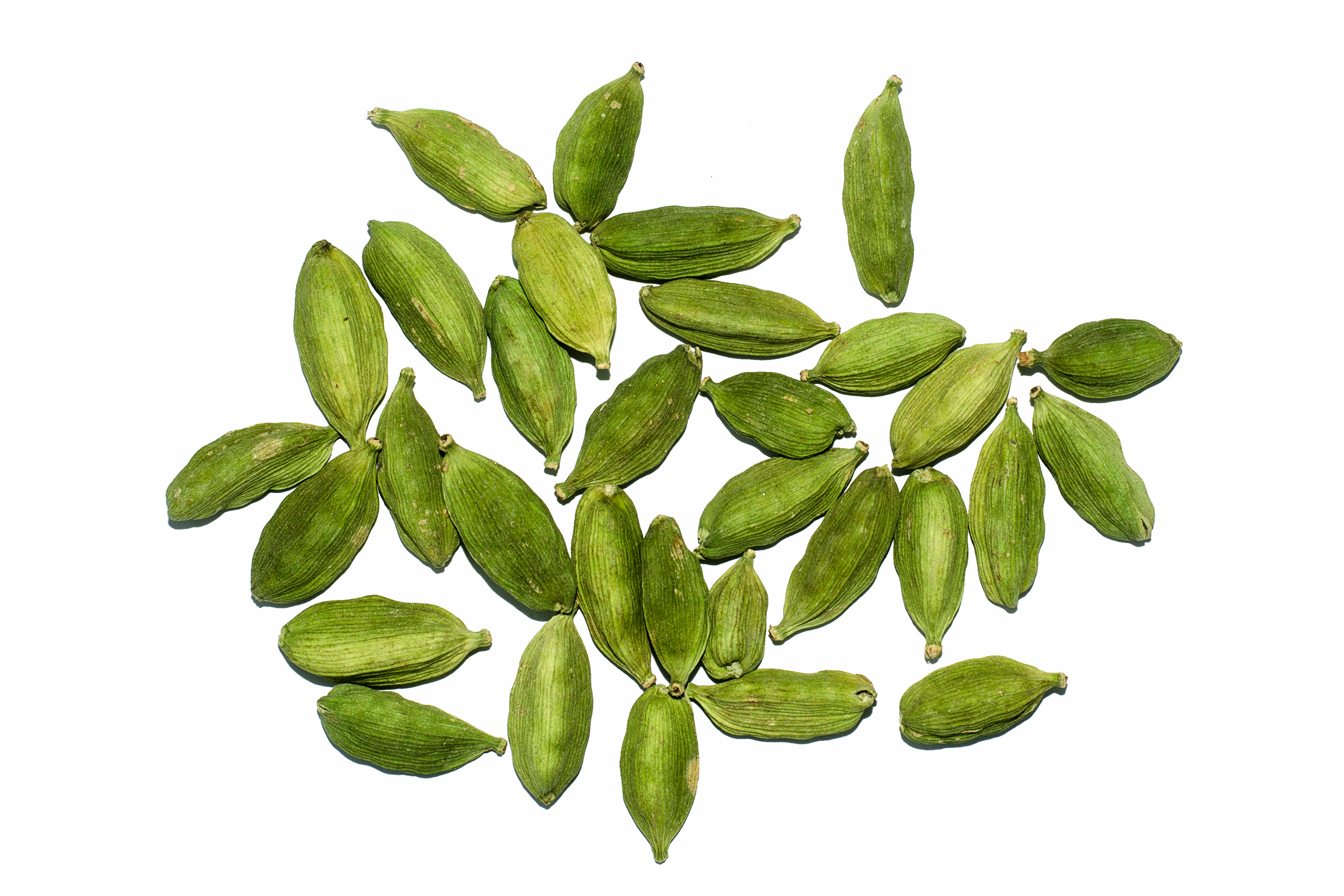
Cardamom

Although there is no solid basis for the famous partition legend (the Cheraman Perumal tradition) surrounding the end of Kodungallur Cheras, it is a possibility that following the mysterious disappearance of the ruler, the land was "partitioned" and that the governors of different nadus asserted independence, proclaiming it as their gift from the last overlord.

There is some ambiguity regarding the exact course of events that led to the establishment of Eradi's rule over Calicut, their later seat. Some historians are of the view that the Eradi was in fact a favourite of the last Kodungallur Chera king as he was at the forefront of the battles with the Chola–Pandya forces in south Kerala. The Eradi seems to have led the Chera army to victory. The king therefore granted him, as a mark of favour, a small tract of land on the sea-coast Calicut in addition to his hereditary possessions (Eralanadu province). The Eradis subsequently moved their seat to the coastal "marshy lands" and established the city of Calicut.

To corroborate his assertion that the Eradi prince was a member of the inner circle of the last Chera king Rama Kulasekhara (c. 1089 – 1122), scholars cite an old Malayalam inscription (1102) found on a granite pillar set up in the courtyard of the Ramashwaram temple, Kollam. According to the inscription, the king, residing at Panainkavu Palace at Kurakkeni Kollam, sitting in council with Arya Brahmins, the Four Brahmin Ministers, the Leader of the Thousand Nairs, the Leader of the Six Hundred Nairs of Venadu, Punthurakkon Manavikrama – the chief of Eranadu, and other feudatories, made prayaschittam (penance) for an offence against the Arya Brahmins by donating cereals for the daily feeding of Brahmins and leasing out a Cherikkal for that purpose to the Venadu chief Kumaran Udaya Varma.

=== Cheraman sword ===
Duarte Barbosa, in the early 16th century, mentions the "Cheraman sword" among the three swords and other royal emblems of the Zamorin usually taken out in ceremonial processions. The sword was worshipped by the Zamorins in their private temple everyday and especially at the time of the coronation. The Cheraman sword was burnt in a surprise attack by the Dutch at Kodungallur (1670) while the Zamorin was residing with Velutha Nambiyar. A new sword was made in 1672 out of the fragments of the old. The broken parts of the 1672 sword, kept in a fully sealed copper sheath, are still worshipped daily in the Bhagavathi temple attached to the palace of the Zamorins at Thiruvachira.

=== Expansions to central Kerala ===
The 17th century work, Keralolpathi describes the events following the gift of Calicut to the Eradi prince.

Kozhikode and its suburbs formed part of Polanadu ruled by Polarthiri. The Eradi marched with his Nairs towards Panniyankara and besieged the Polarthiri at his base, resulting in a 48-year-long standoff. The Eradi was unsuccessful, and then he propitiated the Bhagavati, bribed the followers of Polarthiri and even the consort of the ruler of Polanadu and won them to his side. Learning of this treachery Polarthiri fled from Kozhikode. The Eradi emerged victorious and shifted his seat from Nediyiruppu to Kozhikode – then also called "Thrivikramapuram". The Eradis built a fort (Koyil Kotta) at a place called "Velapuram" (port) to safeguard their new interests.

The power balance in Kerala changed as Eralnadu rulers developed the port at Calicut. The Zamorin became one of the most powerful chiefs in Kerala. In some of his military campaigns – such as that into Valluvanadu – the ruler received unambiguous assistance from the Muslim Middle Eastern sailors. It seems that the Muslim judge of Calicut offered all help in "money and material" to the Zamorin to strike at Thirunavaya.

Smaller chiefdoms south of Calicut – Beypore, Chaliyam, Parappanadu and Tanur (Vettam) – soon had to submit and became their feudatories one by one. The rulers of Payyormala, Kurumbranadu, and other Nair chiefs on the suburbs of Calicut also acknowledged the supremacy of Calicut. There were battles between Calicut and Kurumbranadu for a coastal region called Payyanadu. Payyanadu was a part of Kurumbranadu in early times, and was eventually given as a "royal gift" to Calicut. Calicut easily overran the Kurumbranadu warriors in the battle and Kurumbranadu had to sue for peace by surrendering Valisseri.

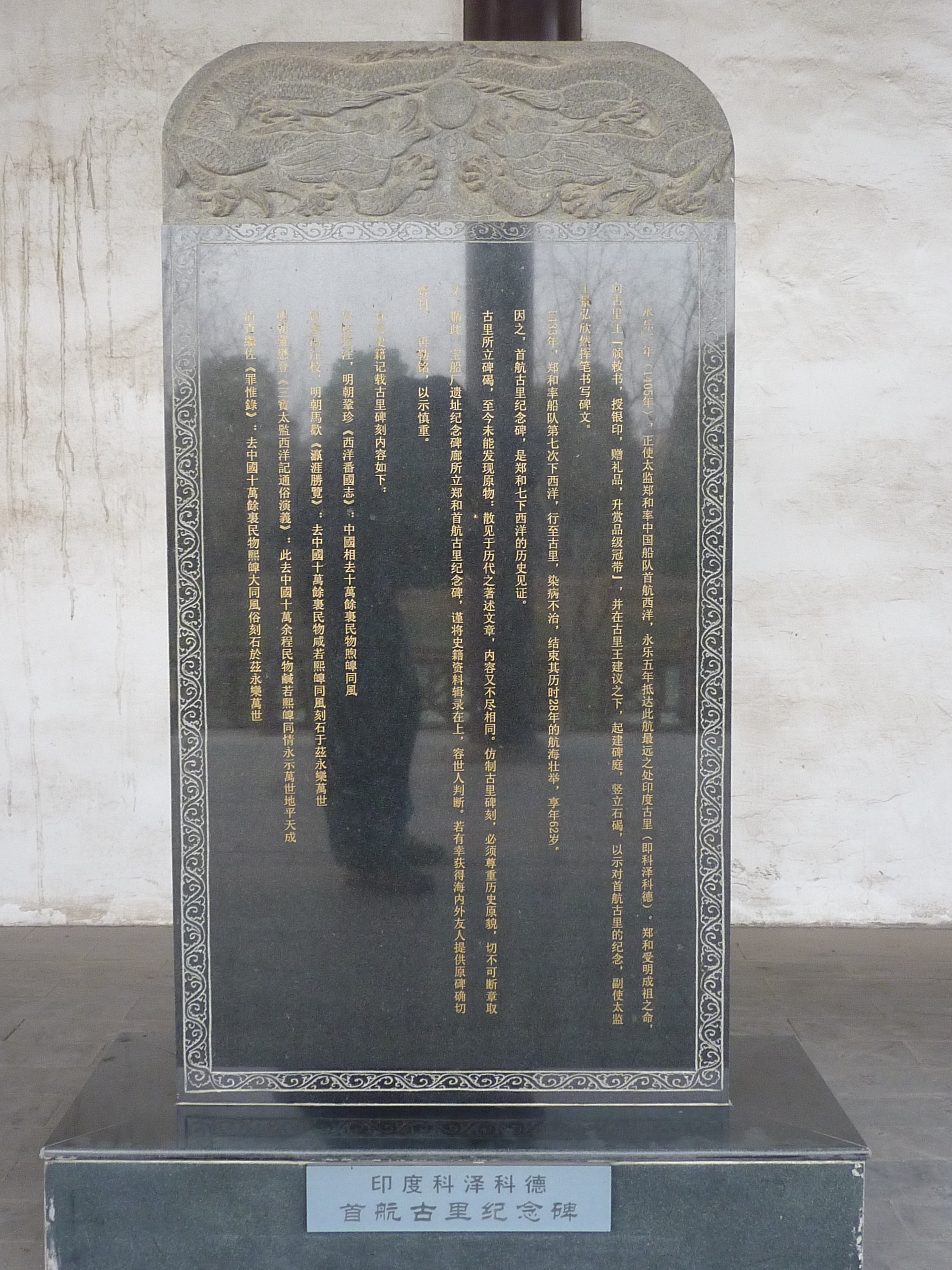
Modern replica of the stele installed at Calicut by Zheng He. Seen along with other steles in the Stele Pavilion of the Treasure Boat Shipyard in Nanjing.

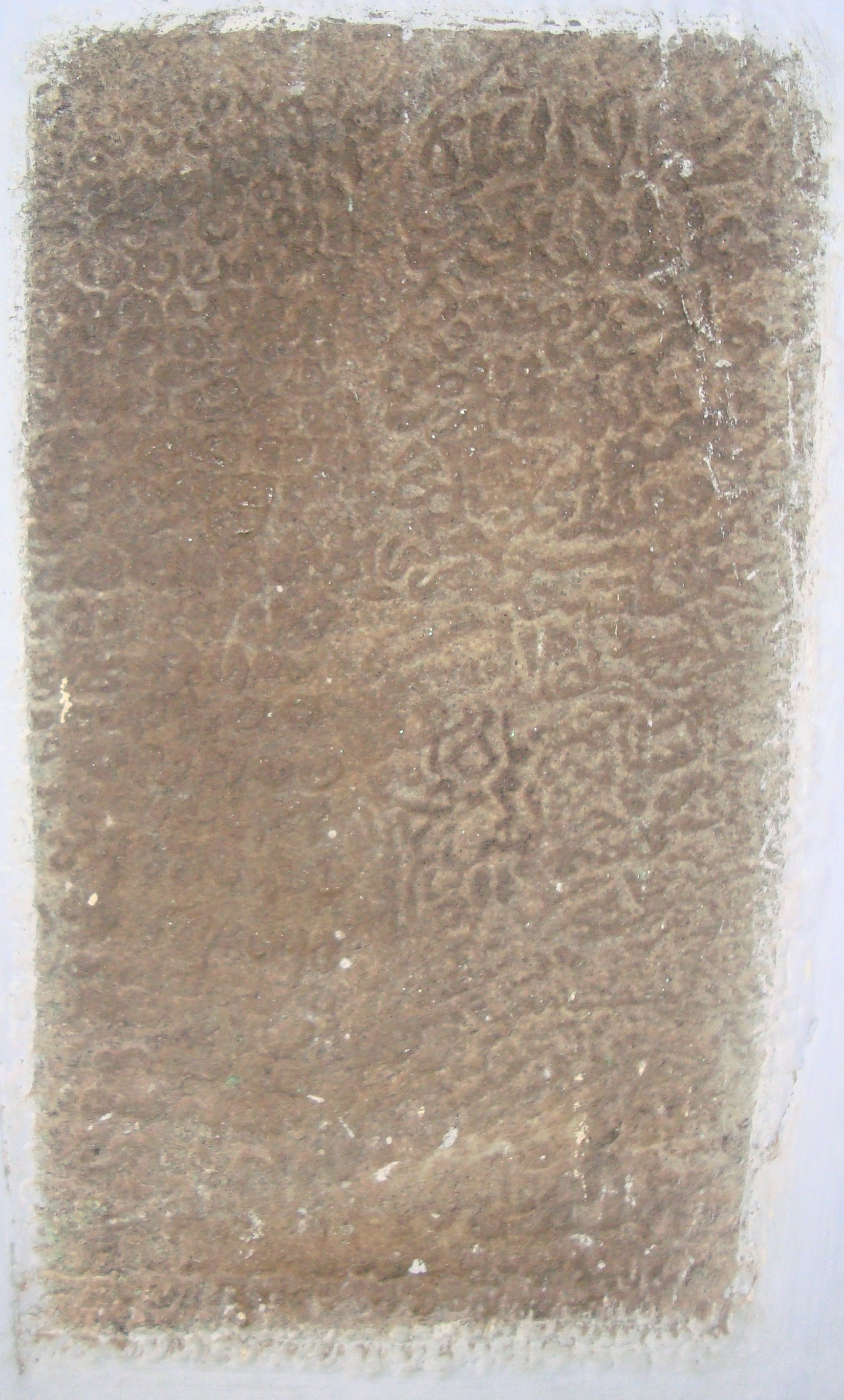
Muccunti Mosque Inscription. Inscription specifically mentions the word "Punturakkon"

The ruler of Calicut next turned his attention to the valley of Perar. Large parts of the valley was then ruled by Valluvakkonathiri, the ancient hereditary chief of Valluvanadu. The principal objective of Calicut was the capture the sacred settlement of Thirunavaya. Soon the Zamorins found themselves intervened in the so-called kurmatsaram between Nambudiris of Panniyurkur and Chovvarakur. In the most recent event, the Nambudiris from Thirumanasseri Nadu had assaulted and burned the nearby rival village. The rulers of Valluvanadu and Perumpadappu came to help the Chovvaram and raided Panniyur simultaneously. Thirumanasseri Nadu was overran by its neighbours on south and east. The Thirumanasseri Nambudiri appealed to the ruler of Calicut for help, and promised to cede the port of Ponnani to Calicut as the price for his protection. Calicut, looking for such an opportunity, gladly accepted the offer.

Assisted by the warriors of their subordinate chiefs (Chaliyam, Beypore, Tanur and Kodungallur) and the Muslim naval fleet under the Koya of Calicut, the Zamorin's fighters advanced by both land and sea. The main force under the command of Zamorin himself attacked, encamping at Thripangodu, an allied force of Valluvanadu and Perumpadappu from the north. Meanwhile, another force under the Eralppadu commanded a fleet across the sea and landed at Ponnani and later moved to Thirumanasseri, with intention to descend on Thirunavaya from the south with help of the warriors of the Thirumanasseri Brahmins. Eralppadu also prevented the warriors of Perumpadappu joining Valluvanadu forces. The Muslim merchants and commanders at Ponnani supported the Calicut force with food, transport and provisions. The warriors of the Eralppadu moved north and crossed the River Perar and took up position on the northern side of the river. The Koya marched at the head of a large column, and stormed Thirunavaya. In spite of the fact that the warriors of Valluvanadu did not get the timely help of Perumpadappu, they fought vigorously and the battle dragged on. In the meantime, the Calicut minister Mangattachan was also successful in turning Kadannamanna Elavakayil Vellodi (junior branch of Kadannamanna) to their side. Finally, two Valluvanadu princes were killed in the battles, the Nairs abandoned the settlement and Calicut infested Thirunavaya.

The capture of Thirunavaya was not the end of Calicut's expansion into Valluvanadu. The Zamorin continued surges over on Valluvanadu. Malappuram, Nilambur, Vallappanattukara and Manjeri were easily occupied. He encountered stiff resistance in some places and the fights went on in a protracted and sporadic fashion for a long time. Further assaults in the east against Valluvanadu were neither prolonged nor difficult for Calicut.

The battles along the western borders of Valluvanadu were bitter, for they were marked by treachery and crime. Panthalur and Ten Kalams came under Calicut only after a protracted struggle. The assassination of a minister of Calicut by the chief minister of Valluvanadu while visiting Venkatakkotta in Valluvanadu sparked the battle, which dragged on for almost a decade. At last the Valluvanadu minister was captured by Zamorin's warriors and executed at Padapparambu, and his province (Ten Kalams, including Kottakkal and Panthalur) were occupied by the Zamorin. The Kizhakke Kovilakam Munalappadu, who took a leading part in this campaign, received half of the newly captured province from Zamorin as a gift. The loss of this fiercely loyal chief minister was the greatest blow to Valluvanadu after the loss of Tirunavaya and Ponnani.

=== Expansions to Kochi ===
Calicut faced defeat in their next assault on Perumpadappu swaroopam. The combined forces of Perumpadappu and Valluvanadu resisted Calicut warriors and a vicious battle ensued for three days, at the end of which Calicut forces was on the retreat.

After a period of uneasy calm in Kerala, Calicut occupied Nedunganadu, a small polity between Valluvanadu and Palakkad (Palghat). Nedunganadu was overran without striking even a single blow. The chief of Nedunganadu surrendered to the Calicut forces at a place called Kodikkuni. Then the Calicut warriors captured a number of smaller villages around Thirunavaya – such as Thiruvegappuram – from Valluvanadu. The Valluvanadu governor tried to overcome the Calicut prince's advance at Kolakkadu. Near Karimpuzha in Valluvanadu, the untouchables – the Cherumas and Panans of Kotta – resisted the advancing Calicut forces. The Calicut won their affection by gifts and presents. Calicut prince was met by an ancestor of Kavalappara Nair, a vassal of Valluvanadu, at Karakkadu. The chiefs under Palakkad surrendered to Calicut at Vengotri, Nellayi and Kakkathodu. Zamorin of Calicut appointed the Eralppadu as the ruler of southern Malabar region during this time. The provincial seat was at Karimpuzha. Talappilli (present day taluk of the same name and coastal regions from Ponnani to Chetwai) and Chengazhinadu submitted to Calicut without any resistance.

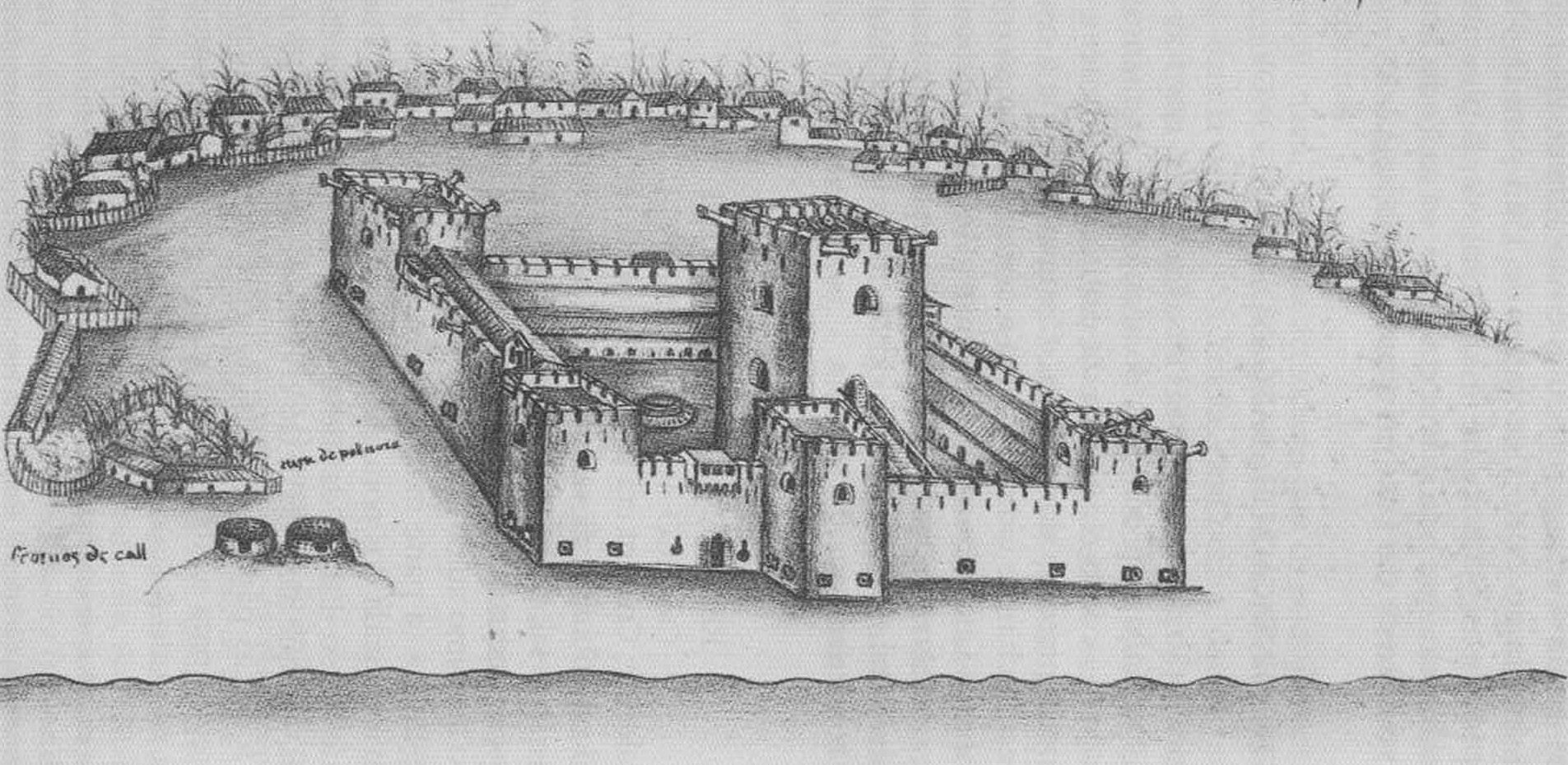
Portuguese fort at Calicut

Calicut then completed the subjugation Ponnani taluk from Valluvanadu and captured Vannerinadu from Perumpadappu. The Perumpadappu ruler was forced to shift their base further south to Thiruvanchikkulam. When Thrikkanamathilakam near Thiruvanchikkulam came under the Calicut control and Perumpadappu ruler again shifted their base further south to Kochi (Cochin, in 1405).

Calicut subjugated large parts of the state of Kochi in the subsequent years. The family feud between the elder and younger branches of the ruling family of Kochi was exploited by the Zamorin of Calicut. The intervention was initiated as Calicut's help was sought against the ruling younger branch. The rulers of Kodungallur, Idappalli, Airur, Sarkkara, Patinjattedam [Thrissur] and Chittur supported or joined Calicut forces in this occupation of Kochi. Some of these were the vassals of Kochi. The Kochi chief was defeated in a battle at Thrissur and his palace was occupied. But, the defeated chief escaped to further south. Pursuing the chief to south, the Calicut forces under Zamorin penetrated and occupied the town of Kochi. Unable to withstand the attacks, Kochi finally accepted Calicut's rule. The prince from the elder branch was installed on the throne of Kochi as vassal.

The battles against Kochi were followed by a battle against Palakkad and the expansion to Naduvattom by a Calicut prince. Kollengode of Venganadu Nambitis was also put under the sway of Calicut during the time. The severe and frequent battles with Valluvanadu by Calicut continued. But even after the loss of his superior ally Kochi, Valluvanadu did not submit to Calicut. The ruler of Calicut followed a custom of settling Muslim families and the families of other Hindu generals who had allegiance to him, in the captured areas of Valluvanadu. Calicut occupied Valluvanadu (now shrunk to Attappadi valley, parts of Mannarkkad, Ottappalam and Perinthalmanna) but could not make much progress into its hinterland.

Calicut was also successful in bringing the polity of Kolathunadu (Cannanore) under their control. During his expansions, the Zamorin occupied Pantalayini Kollam as a preliminary advance to Kolathunadu. Kolathiri immediately sent ambassadors to submit to whatever terms Calicut might dictate. Kolathunadu transferred the regions already occupied to Calicut and certain Hindu temple rights. The stories about the origin of the Kadathanadu ruling family (Vatakara) are associated with battle of the Eradis with Polanadu. When the Zamorin swarmed over Polanadu, he exiled a Polarthiri royal princess and she was welcomed in Kolathunadu (Cannanore) – one of the Zamorin's rivals polities. After the marriage of a Kolathu prince with this princess the Kadathanadu ruling family was born. The name Kadathanadu refers to as the passing way between Kolathunadu and Calicut. Some land and Hindu temple rights were transferred to Calicut during a visit to Kollam by a ruler of the Calicut.

== Vijayanagara conquests ==
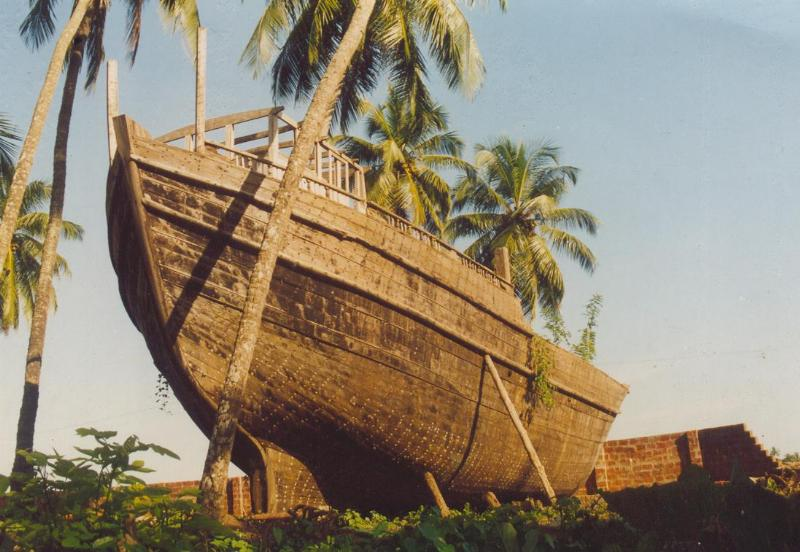
Large boats built in Calicut

Deva Raya II (1424–1446), king of the Vijayanagara Empire, conquered the whole of present-day Kerala state in the 15th century. He defeated (1443) rulers of Venadu (Kollam, Quilon), as well as Calicut. Fernão Nunes says that the Zamorin and even the kings of Burma ruling at Pegu and Tenasserim paid tribute to the king of Vijayanagara Empire. Later Calicut and Venadu seems to have rebelled against their Vijayanagara overlords, but Deva Raya II quelled the rebellion.

As the Vijayanagara power diminished over the next fifty years, Zamorin of Calicut again rose to prominence in Kerala. Zamorin built a fort at Ponnani in 1498.

An embassy from the Zamorin of Calicut, in which the chief envoy was a Persian-speaking Muslim, came to the Timurid court of Mirza Shahrukh at Herat in the 15th century. Some Herat officials had, some years earlier, on their return journey from the Sultanate of Bengal, been stranded at port Calicut, and on this occasion had been received by the Zamorin of Calicut. Impressed by the description of the Timurid influence, the Zamorin decided to send his own embassy to Herat.

Abdur Razzaq, an employ of Shahrukh, was soon engaged on a mission to Calicut (November 1442 – April 1443). He carried a series of presents from Herat, including a horse, a pelisse, headgear and ceremonial robes. "As for duties [at Calicut], at one-fortieth, and that too, only on sales, they are even lower than at Hormuz [in the Persian Gulf]", says Abdur Razzaq.

While in Calicut, Razzaq was invited by the Vijayanagara ruler Deva Raya II to his court. The envoy arrived from the Vijayanagara king had "asked" the Zamorin to send the Herat envoy on to his court. He also says the king of Vijayanagara does not possess "jurisdiction" over the kingdom of Calicut, but the Zamorin was apparently "still in great awe of the Vijayanagar king".

== Foreign relations ==
=== Relations with Yuan and Ming China ===
"In the fifth year of the Yongle emperor [1407], the court ordered the principal envoy ... Zheng He ... to deliver an imperial mandate [a statement of formal investiture] to the king of [Calicut] and to bestow him a patent conferring a title of honour ... Zheng He went these in command of a large fleet of treasure-ships, and he erected a tablet with a pavilion over it and set up a stone which said:
"Though the journey from this country [Kingdom of Calicut] to the Middle Kingdom is more than a hundred thousand li, yet people are very similar, happy, and prosperous, with identical customs."

— Account of the members of Zheng He's entourage

It is known that the Tang Chinese ships frequently visited the then major Kerala ports such as Kollam for spices (in the 9th–10th centuries). According historians, the "Nanpiraj" mentioned in the Ling daida can be identified with Calicut.

From the 13th century, Calicut developed into the major trading centre where the Middle-Eastern and Chinese sailors met to exchange their products. Marco Polo who visited Calicut in 1293– 1294 records that the trade in Kerala was dominated by the Chinese. Ibn Batutah refers to the brisk Chinese trade at Calicut. Wang Ta-yuan – during the Yuan period – describes the pepper trade in Calicut in his work "Tao-i-Chih".

Zheng He (Cheng Ho), the renowned Ming Chinese admiral, visited Calicut several times in the early 15th century. Zheng most probably died at Calicut in 1433 during his seventh voyage to the West.

A major objective of the first Ming expedition (1405–1407) was the kingdom of Calicut. Historians presume that the fleet stayed from December 1406 to April 1407 at Calicut. Ambassadors from Calicut, among envoys from other states, accompanied the returning (first expedition) fleet bringing articles of "tribute" to Nanking in 1407. On the second expedition, in 1408–09, Zheng He again visited Calicut – stopping as well in "Chochin" (Kochi). The envoys in the second expedition (1408–1409) carried out the formal "investiture" of the Zamorin of Calicut "Mana Piehchialaman". A memorial inscription was erected in Calicut to commemorate the investiture. The Chinese titles and gifts (brocades and gauzes) were given to the Zamorin and his retinue by the Chinese envoys. Presumably a stay of about four months was made at Calicut, possibly from December 1408 to April 1409. The third expedition (1409–1411) – the first one to sail to beyond India – also visited Calicut. The fleet sailed on from Calicut to Sri Lanka in 1411. The fourth (1413–1415), fifth (1417–1419), sixth (1421–22) and seventh (1431–33) fleets also visited Calicut. A number of tribute delegations – in 1421, 1423, and 1433, among others – were dispatched by the Calicut rulers to Nanking and Peking. Presents from Calicut included horses and black pepper. Brocades of several types were presented to some of the Calicut envoys. Ma Huan visited Calicut several times, and describes the trade in the region. Fei-Hsin also notices the brisk trade at Calicut.

The few remnants of the Chinese trade can be seen in and around the present city of Calicut. This include a Silk Street, Chinese Fort ("Chinakotta"), Chinese Settlement ("Chinachery" in Kappad), and Chinese Mosque ("Chinapalli" in Panthalayini Kollam).

=== Relations with the Portuguese ===
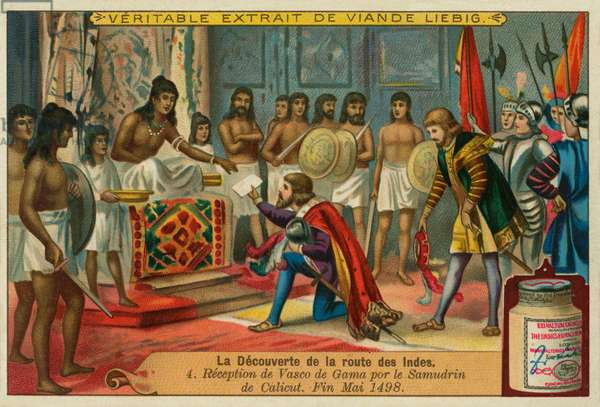
Vasco Da Gama welcomed by the Zamorin

"No one has tried to clear that misconception [that Vasco da Gama landed at Kappad]. The government has even installed a memorial stone at the Kappad beach. Actually [Vasco da] Gama landed at Panthalayini (Koyilandy) in the [Kozhikode] district because there was a port there and Kozhikode did not have one. It does not have a port even now."

— M. G. S. Narayanan

"He was taken to a place [in Kozhikkode] where there were two Moors [Muslims] from Tunis, who knew how to speak Castilian and Genoese.

"What the Devil! What brought you here?"
"We came in search of Christians and of spices!"

— Velho 1987: 54–55

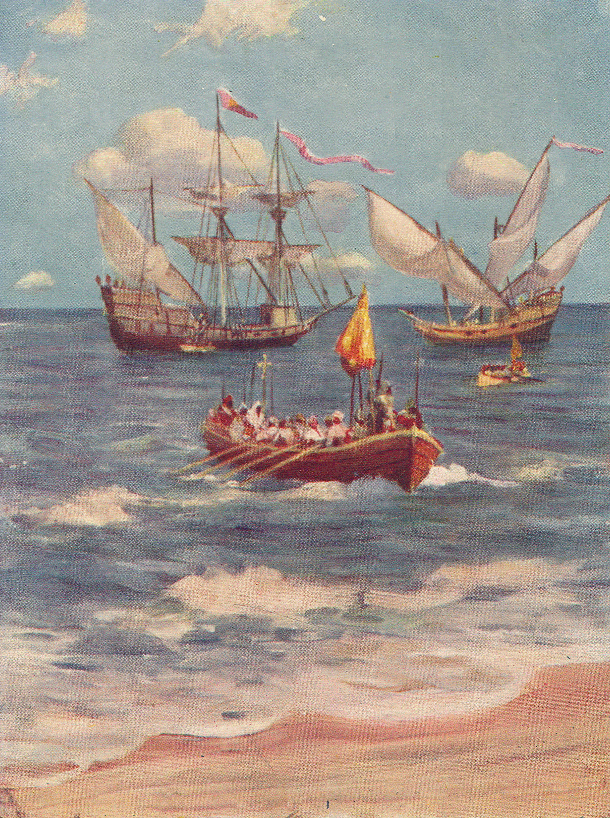
Vasco da Gama landing in Calicut – a modern depiction (1911) by Allan Stewart

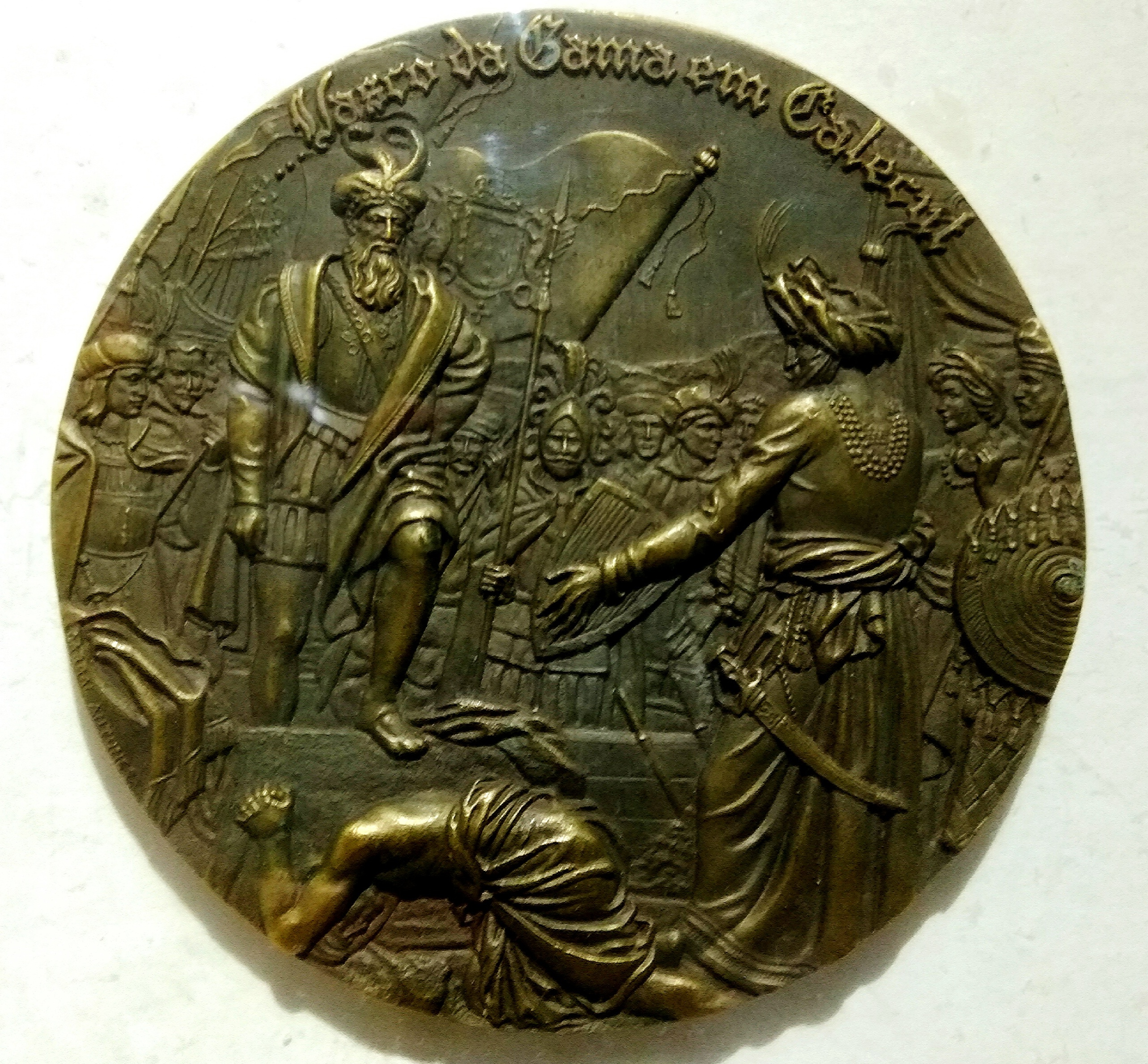
Portuguese coin issued to commemorate Vasco da Gama's landing in Calicut

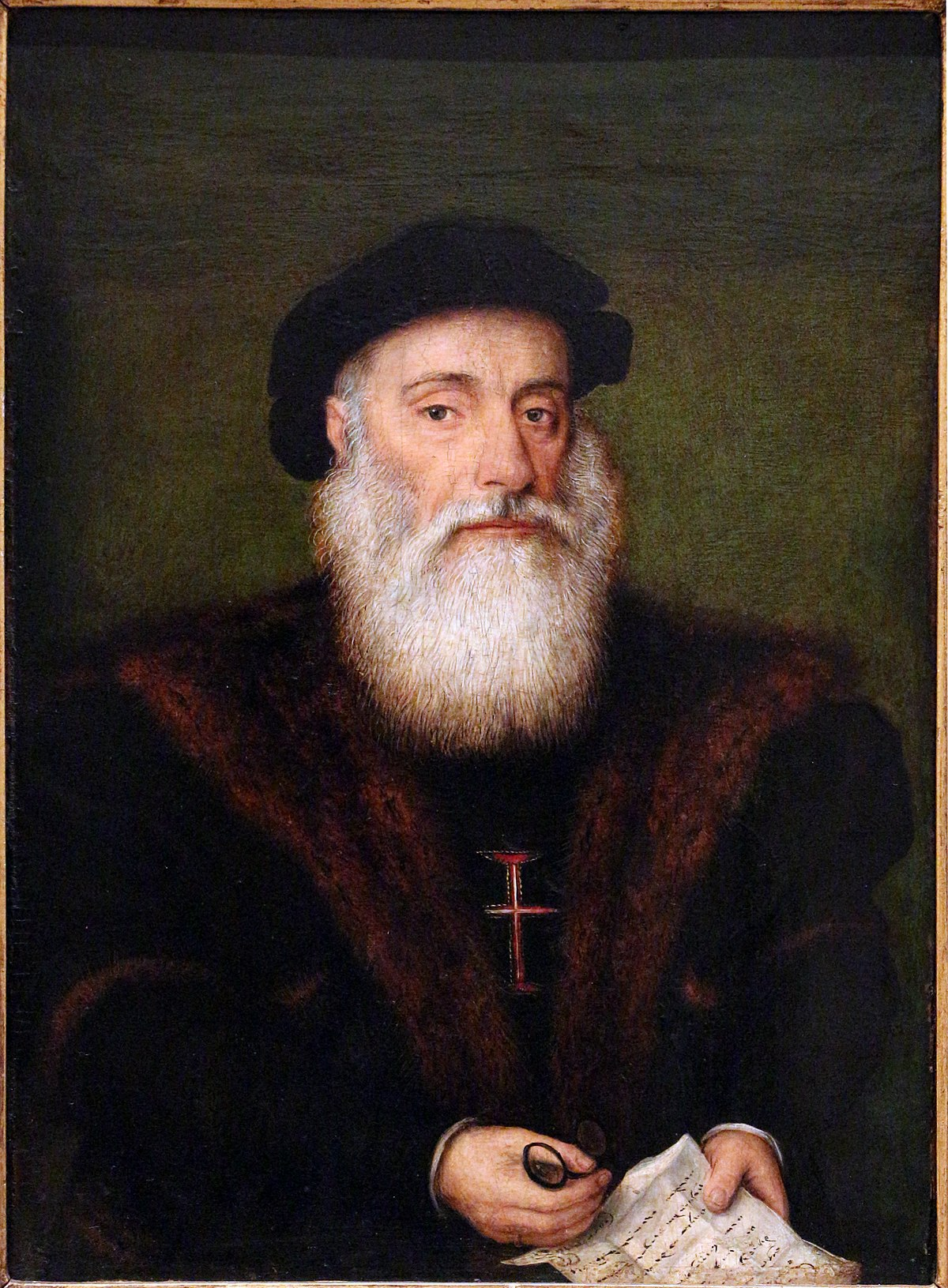
Vasco Da Gama

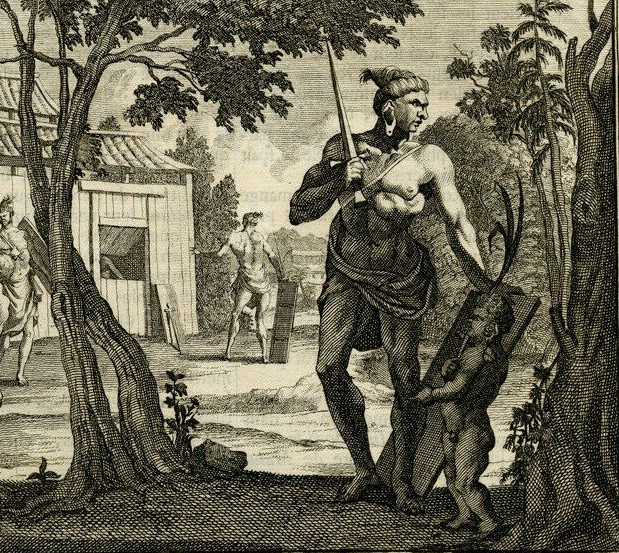
Nairs of Malabar in 'Les Voyages du sieur Albert de Mandelslo' by Pierre van der Aa in Leiden (1720)

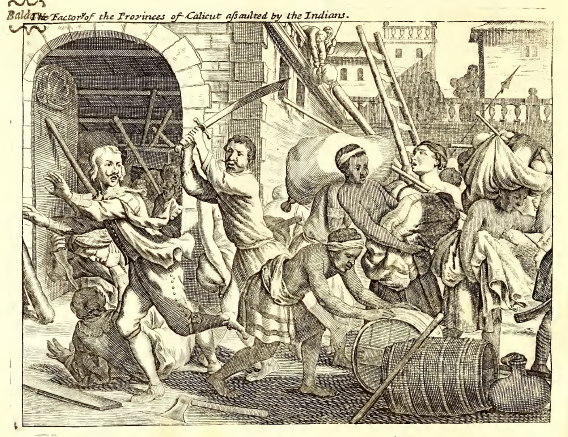
Arabs and Malabar locals attacking the Portuguese in Calicut

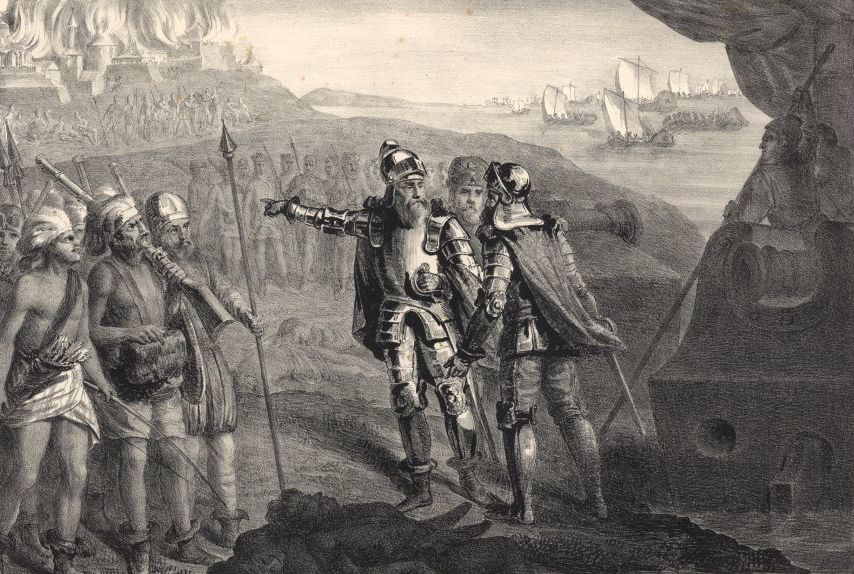
Duarte Pacheco's victory at the Battle of Cochin (1504)

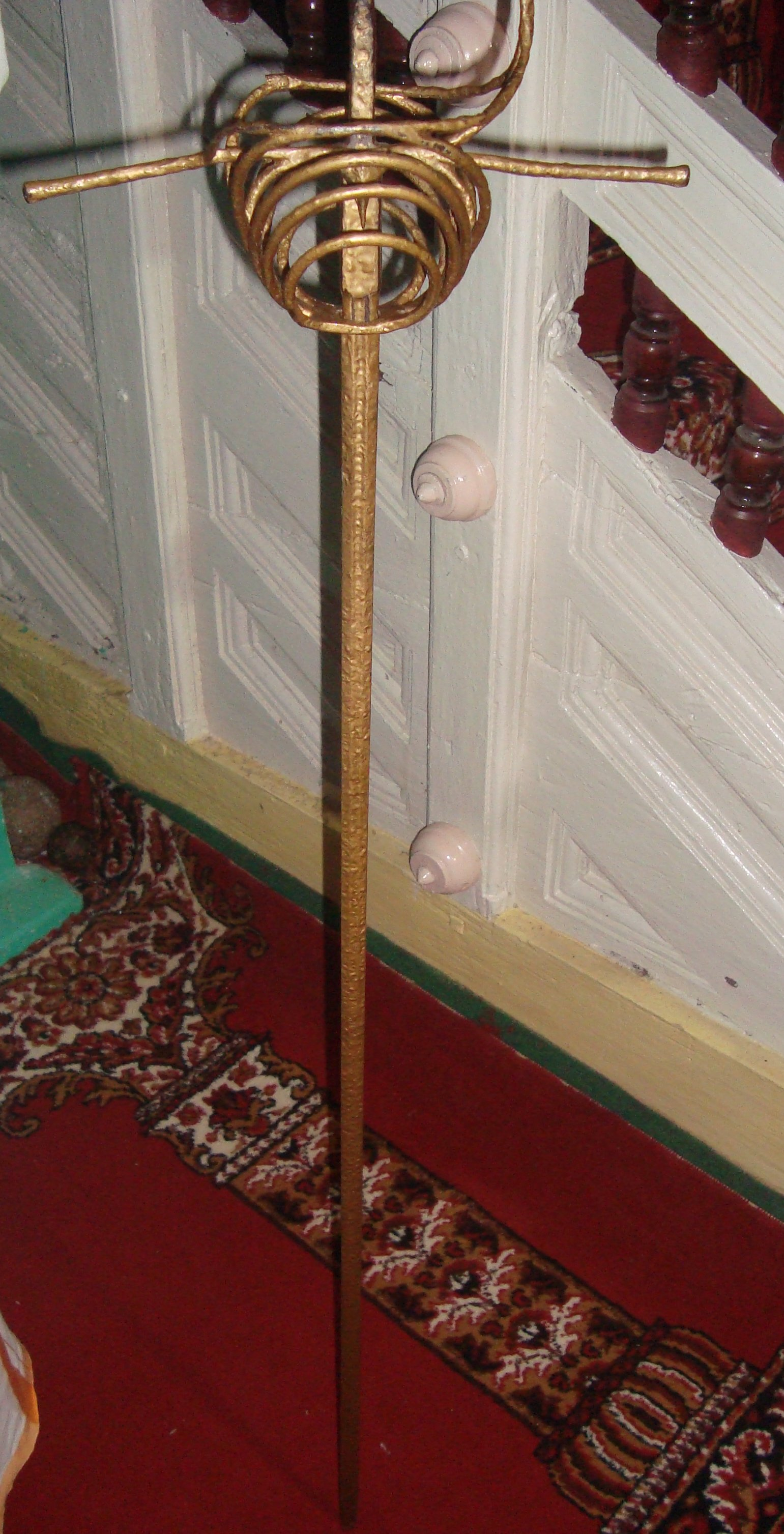
The sword used by Kunjali Marakkar, preserved at Kottakkal Mosque, Vadakara

The landing of Vasco da Gama in Calicut in 1498 has often been considered as the beginning of a new phase in Asian history during which the control of the Indian Ocean spice trade passed into the hands of the Europeans from Middle Eastern Muslims. The strong colony of foreign merchants settled in Calicut was hostile, but Zamorin welcomed the Portuguese and allowed them to take spices on board. In Portugal, the goods brought by da Gama from India were computed at "sixty times the cost of the entire Asia expedition".

The Portuguese initially entered into hostile conflicts with the Zamorin of Calicut and the Middle Eastern (Paradesi) merchants in Calicut. Within the next few decades, the Estado da Índia also found themselves fighting with several leading Mappila trading families of Kerala (esp. the Kannur Mappilas, led by Mammali and the Marakkars of the Pearl Fishery Coast). Kingdom of Calicut, whose shipping was increasingly looted by the Portuguese, evolved into a centre of resistance. The Portuguese maintained patrolling squadrons off the Kerala ports and continued their raids on departing native fleets. Mappila and Marakkar traders actively worked in the kingdoms of Malabar Coast and Ceylon to oppose the Portuguese. Naval battles broke out across Konkan, Malabar Coast, southern Tamil Nadu, and western Sri Lanka. Marakkars transformed as the admirals of Calicut and organised an effective collection of vessels to fight the Portuguese.

The Kunjali Marakkars are credited with organizing the first naval defense of the Indian coast. Tuhfat Ul Mujahideen written by Zainuddin Makhdoom II (born around 1532) of Ponnani in 16th-century is the first-ever known book fully based on the history of Kerala to be authored by a Keralite. It is written in Arabic and contains pieces of information about the resistance put up by the navy of Kunjali Marakkar alongside the Zamorin of Calicut from 1498 to 1583 against Portuguese attempts to colonize Malabar coast. It was first printed and published in Lisbon. A copy of this edition has been preserved in the library of Al-Azhar University, Cairo.

Francisco de Almeida (1505–1509) and Afonso de Albuquerque (1509–1515), who followed da Gama to India, were instrumental in establishing the Império Colonial Português in Asia. By the mid-16th century, the Portuguese managed to curtail the vital trade between Calicut and the Middle East. In the end of the century, Kochi was the dominant seaport in Kerala, having surpassed both Kannur and Calicut. The Portuguese set about breaking the monopoly which Venetians and the Egyptians had so long enjoyed in the trade with Asia. The Egyptians and the Ottoman Turks realised the danger, but internal complications between them gave the Portuguese an opportunity. Ponnani Muhammed Kunjali Marakkar was eventually executed by the combined effects of the Kingdom of Calicut and the Portuguese state in 1600.

Date	Event
May 1498	Vasco da Gama lands in Calicut, and is warmly welcomed by the Zamorin of Calicut. Much to the delight of the discontented Middle Eastern merchants, da Gama's "ordinary" trade goods were hardly suitable for trade in Calicut. The merchandise he carried – no gold and silver – only came handy in the trade on the West African coast. However, the Zamorin of Calicut gave his sanction for opening trade, and assigned a small warehouse with Nairs to guard it and brokers sell their goods. Sale and purchases fails to meet the expectations. Da Gama demands Kerala spices in return for his unsalable wares. The Zamorin replied that he should buy what he needed for gold and silver instead of dumping his stock in exchange, and he must pay the usual Calicut customs duties. After some confusion – the warehouse was robbed once – the fleet leaves Calicut in August. They also took with them some on-board Mukkuvar. It is also known that da Gama erected a padrão in the kingdom of Calicut. The fleet makes interactions – and trade – with Zamorin's rival chief, the Kolathiri (Cannanore) on their return journey.
September 1500	Pedro Álvares Cabral reaches Calicut, rich presents were exchanged, and a treaty of friendship, "as long as the sun and moon should endure", was entered upon. The Zamorin was pleased with return of the Mukkuvas whom da Gama had taken to Portugal. Cabral manages to obtain the permission to construct a trading post in Calicut. The Zamorin nominates a Mappila named Koya Pakki as the Portuguese broker in Calicut. At the request of the Zamorin, Cabral captures a Kochi vessel passing the port Calicut. The vessel is subsequently restored to the chief of Kochi.
December 1500	The merchants of Calicut appear to have effectually prevented the Portuguese from obtaining any large supply of spices. Cabral accused the Muslim merchants of deliberately outbidding them, and sending away all the spices that came to the market. The Zamorin permitted Cabral to search the Middle Eastern ships and "take whatever he found them after paying to the owners what they had themselves had paid and the customs duties to Calicut officers". Cabral seized a Middle Eastern ship at midnight and transfers all its spices to his depot. A general riot is broken out in Calicut. Around 50 Portuguese sailors at the depot are massacred, a few taken captive, by the Muslims. The depot is razed. The Portuguese seize ten of the Zamorin's Muslim ships, at Calicut, execute their crews, and set fire to them and leave port Calicut by bombarding it. Around 600 Malabarians are killed.
24 December 1500	The Portuguese, led by Pedro Álvares Cabral, reach the port of Kochi. Kochi Raja, a chieftain at the time, was subordinate to the Zamorin of Calicut.
January 1501	The Portuguese conclude a treaty with the chief of Kochi Tirumalpadu; an alliance of friendship was signed, allowing them to open a factory (trading post). Cabral is permitted to trade for spices, with which he loads his six remaining ships. A Calicut fleet, carrying around 1500 men, appears off the harbour of Kochi. The Calicut fleet holds off. Cabral chases them, but is overtaken by a violent storm which carries him to the sea. He later sails to Kannur, and from there proceeds to Europe.
March 1501	João da Nova is despatched from Portugal to India. He anchors at Anjediva in November and from there sails to Kannur. While travelling from Kannur to Kochi the fleet attacks and captures a Muslim vessel opposite to the Calicut.
December 1501	About 180 Calicut vessels filled with Muslims arrive at Kochi from Calicut, for the purpose of attacking the Portuguese. John de Nueva fires cannon at them, sinking a large number of vessels. The Muslims persuade native merchants all of over Kerala to refuse to trade their spices and textiles with the Portuguese. Owing to the generosity of the chief of Kochi alone, his ships are soon loaded with spices and textiles, and the fleet departs for Europe. The First Battle of Cannanore between the Third Portuguese Armada and Kingdom of Cochin under João da Nova and Zamorin of Kozhikode's navy marks the beginning of Portuguese conflicts in the Indian Ocean.
August 1502	Vasco da Gama returns to India to try to control Calicut. He burns a ship full of Muslim pilgrims – around 700 – from Mecca off the coast of Madayi. The ship also carried a chief merchant from Calicut. This individual – fairly rich – was the brother of Khoja Kasim, the Factor of the Sea to the Zamorin of Calicut. However, the burning and sinking of the ship is not related by any contemporary and reliable sources. Some assume that the description may be "legendary or at least exaggerated". Da Gama is warmly welcomed by Kolathiri at Kannur, and arranges a treaty of commerce. Kolathiri agrees to supply spices at the Kochi prices and obtain "passes" (cartazes) for the ships his subjects. He next divides his fleet; one portion of it is to wage war on all native vessels except those of Kannur (Kolathunadu), Kochi (Permpatappu) and Quilon (Kollam ), which are to be protected by "passes" obtained from the factors at Kannur and Kochi respectively. Vincent de Sodre mistreats Khoja Muhammed Marakkar – a wealthy Muslim from Cairo – who had insulted the Kolathiri. Sailing southwards, da Gama is informed by a Brahmin messenger that the Zamorin have arrested the Muslims who were guilty of the outrage on the trading depot. Da Gama was offered a large sum to pay for the factory goods. He sent back word to say that he did not want money, and also mistreated the Brahmin messenger. Some historians assume that this was an attempt to lure da Gama to Calicut, and then to apprehend him. Da Gama – who certainly thought so – fires cannon at the port Calicut, and kills around 40 natives. The Zamorin tries to counterattack in vain. To starve the city of Calicut the Portuguese plunders rice shipments from Mangalore.
November 1502	Da Gama reaches Kochi and signs a treaty of commerce with the rulers of Kochi and Kollam. A factory is set up at Kochi by da Gama; its first factor is Diogo Fernandes Correia. The fleet then sails to Kannur, defeating two squadrons of a Calicut Arab Muslim fleet on the way, and then for Europe on 28 December. While at Kochi (1502), da Gama was visited by a deputation of Christians from Kodungallur. Zamorin of Calicut, after the departure of the Armada, demands to the ruler of Kochi the Portuguese factors left at Kochi should be given to him. The demand is refused by the ruler of Kochi.
1503	The Portuguese crown the new ruler of Kochi, effectively making him a vassal of the King of Portugal.
March–April 1503	Calicut forces of more than 50,000 Nairs attack Kochi. The forces enter the Kochi territory, and occupy Edappalli in March. In a series of engagements, the Calicut forces defeat around 5,500 Kochi Nairs led by Narayanan, the heir apparent of Kochi, near Kodungallur. Narayanan, and his two nephews, are slain in the battle and the Calicut forces cross the backwater to Kochi. The wounded Kochi chief escapes to the island of Vypin with the Portuguese. The Calicut forces burn Kochi. As the monsoon has begun, the Calicut forces, leaving a strong detachment at Kochi, retreat to Kodungallur. Two Italians desert to the side of the Calicut during these battles (these men later construct five big guns for the Calicut).
September 1503	Francisco de Albuquerque, sailing from Kannur, reaches Kochi. The Calicut's blockading forces are easily defeated at Vypin island, and are driven back to Kodungallur. The Portuguese take Edappalli (Repelim). Albuquerque obtains permission to build a fort – Fort Manuel, the first Portuguese fort in Asia – at Kochi. Soon, Afonso de Albuquerque, his brother, arrives at Kochi with three more ships. The Portuguese are starved of spices and textiles at Kochi by the Zamorin of Calicut and the Muslims merchants. Their fleet moves south to Quilon, and with aid of local Christian merchants easily procure the spices, and obtain permission to open a factory.
January 1504	Albuquerque leaves Malabar, his ships laden with spices. Before doing so he concludes a short-lived treaty with the Zamorin of Calicut. The peace is broken by the murder of six Malabarians by the Portuguese.
March–July 1504	Pacheco and a small garrison of 150 men guard Fort Manuel. Around 57,000 Nairs from all over the kingdom of Calicut, assisted by 5 cannon guns and 160 paraos, attack Pacheco at the Edappally ferry. He manages to drive back the enemy several times. The Kochi Nairs provide little help in opposing the Calicut forces. As the monsoon sets in, cholera breaks out among the Calicut forces. The Zamorin of Calicut at last gives up the attempt in despair.
July 1504	Pacheco quells a partial outbreak at Kollam.
August 1504	Pacheco defeats the Calicut troops at Chetwye.
September 1504	Suarez de Menezes arrives in Kannur. He unsuccessfully tries to rescue some of the prisoners taken at Calicut in Cabral's time. He cannons the city of Calicut and sails to Kochi. The fleet raids and burns the city of Kodungallur, held by Patinjattedam chief under the Calicut. The Portuguese spare the Christian houses, shops and churches, but they loot those of the Jews and Muslims.
March 1505	A large Muslim fleet at Pantalayini Kollam in the kingdom of Calicut is destroyed. It had assembled there to take back a large number of Muslims to Arabia and Egypt, who were leaving the kingdom of Calicut disappointed at the trade losses caused to them recently. De Menezes captures 17 vessels and kills 2,000 men.
September 1505	Francisco de Almeyda commences building of Anjediva Fort.
October 1505	Building of St. Angelo Fort, Kannur commences. De Almeyda is visited by a Vijayanagara delegation. Francisco de Almeyda arrives at Kochi.
November 1505	Murder of the Portuguese factor António de Sá and his 12 men by a mob in Kollam. Lorenzo de Almeyda, finding 27 Calicut vessels at Kollam, engages and sinks them all. Francisco de Almeyda is crowned the new chief in Kochi.
February 1506	The Mamluk Sultanate of Egypt sends a fleet, commanded by Amir Hussain al-Kurdi al-Askar, into the Indian Ocean. The Ottomans help in the construction of the fleet. The fleet leaves Jiddah only in August/September 1507 and sets sail to Diu (ruled by Malik Ayaz).
March 1506	Lorenz de Almeyda intercepts an armada of 210 large vessels of Turks (Ottoman) and Muslims whom the Zamorin had launched against Kannur. Around 3,000 Muslims are killed in the assault and the Portuguese loss is very trifling.
April 1507	Joined forces of Kannur and Calicut attack St. Angelo Fort. The old Kolathiri – the original friend of Vasco da Gama – has died and the new ruler is already displeased with the Portuguese for harming prominent Muslims merchants at Kannur. Combined forces, including around 60,000 Nairs, lay siege to the St. Angelo Fort. Brito, the Cannanore Commandant, resists the Malabaris for four months.
August 1507	The Portuguese, assisted by eleven ship under da Cunha freshly arrived from Europe, break the blockade. The ruler of Kannur is forced to accede to the sailors.
November 1507	The Portuguese under Almeyda attack Ponnani, destroying the town and shipping. 18 Portuguese are killed in the assault on the place. A number of Muslims take an oath to die as "matrys" on this occasion. As per some historians, as result of the assault, the family of Marakkars relocated from Ponnani to Puthupattanam (in North Malabar). The Zamorin of Calicut later appointed Marakkar I as his admiral. Kutti Ali served under Marakkar I. Some scholars identify the first Marakkar Kutti Ahmed Ali with Muhammed of Kochi.
March 1508	Albuquerque is imprisoned by Almeyda. The Egyptian navy, under the command of Admiral Amir Hussain and supported by the forces of Mahmud Begarha (Sultan of Gujarat), defeat the Portuguese at the Battle of Chaul, killing Lorenzo de Almeyda in the process. The Egyptian force of 1500 Mamluks also includes Calicut's ambassador to Cairo, Mayimama Marakkar. Mayimama Marakkar is also killed in the action. The alliance between Amir Hussain and Malik Ayaz begins to fall apart. Ayaz enters into secret negotiations with de Amleyda.
November 1508	De Almeyda – with a fleet carrying 1300 Europeans, among others – sails to Kannur.
February 1509	The defeat of joint fleet of the Sultan of Gujarat, the Mamlûk Burji Sultanate of Egypt, and the Zamorin of Calicut with support of the Republic of Venice and the Ottoman Empire in Battle of Diu marks the beginning of Portuguese dominance of the Spice trade and the Indian Ocean. De Almeyda counter-attacks and defeats the Egyptian navy, which is assisted by Calicut forces, at the Battle of Diu. The defeat off Diu is a major blow to the Muslims. Amir Hussain, though wounded, flees to the Gujarat capital. He eventually reaches Cairo in December 1512.
November 1509	A new fleet arrives from Europe. Albuquerque takes charge as Capitão-Mor.
1510	Fernando Coutinho arrives at Kannur. He brings instruction from Lisbon that Calicut should be destroyed. Such had been, it is said, the counsel sent to Europe by the Kolathiri and by the chief of Kochi. Governor Albuquerque and Fernando Coutinho lands in the city of Calicut. Fernando Coutinho and his men are slain in this misguided adventure, Albuquerque is shot, and the Mananchira palace is sacked and set on fire.
September 1510	The Chief of Kochi decides to relinquish the throne. Albuquerque eventually succeeds in preventing the abdication.
November 1510	Governor Albuquerque takes Goa – Adil Khan is absent from the place – and it finally supplants Kochi as the chief Portuguese settlement in India. Among others he is assisted by the 300 hand-picked Nairs from Kannur.
July 1511	Albuquerque takes Malacca in the East Indies.
February 1511	Albuquerque establishes schools for the benefit of 400 natives who have converted to Christianity in Kochi.
1513	Albuquerque lands at Calicut and has an interview with the Zamorin. Calicut and the Portuguese sign a treaty giving the Portuguese the right trade as "they pleased", and to erect a fort in the kingdom of Calicut.
1514–15	Fort Calicut is built on the right bank of the Kallayi river near the city of Calicut. Albuquerque grants the Zamorin a certain number of cartazes for the merchants based at Calicut, enabling them to resume trade with Aden, Jiddah and Gujarat. The Zamorin sends envoys to the King of Portugal with a letter expressing his readiness to supply goods.
1515	Albuquerque takes Hormuz (Ormus) in the Persian Gulf.
1515–17	Lopo Saores demands that the Zamorin should repair to Fort Calicut and wait upon him. Hostilities are averted only by the good sense of the captains posted in the fort.
1517	Assassination attempt on the Zamorin. The Portuguese invite the Zamorin to a house within their fort under the pretext of presenting the king with some gifts. The Zamorin, with the help of a Portuguese officer, escapes from the fort. The officer is later banished with all kin to Kannur.
1519	One of Kochi chief's nobles invades some lands belonging to one of the Zamorin's barons. This leads to a general battle, and the Kochi chief suffers a defeat.
1521	Kochi Nairs, assisted by some men sent by Governor Sequeiro, invade Chetwai. But the Kochi chief is soon outnumbered, and is pursued right up to his capital.
1523	The Muslims, under the leadership of Kutti Ali, capture ten Portuguese vessels, and raid Kochi and Kodungallur harbours. The Muslims later insult the Governor Duarte de Menezes. In 1524 he bombards Fort Calicut.
1524	Duarte de Menezes comes to Fort Calicut. The Zamorin is dead and his successor (1522–1531) does not favour the Portuguese alliance. Kutti Ali anchors his fleet of 200 vessels at Calicut, to load eight ships with spices, and to dispatch them with a convoy of 40 vessels to the Red Sea before the very eyes of the Portuguese.
1524	The King of Portugal sends Vasco Da Gama again to India. His mission is to reform the abuses which had crept into the administration in India. The ruler of Kannur (Kolathiri) surrenders a "pirate" chief called Bala Hassan to da Gama, who is thereupon thrown into a dungeon in Cannanore Fort. This man is related to the family of the Arakkal chief. Martu Alfonso de Souza under his orders relieves Calicut, engages the famous Kutti Ali's fleet and drives it to Kannur. Kutti Ali finally abandons his ships.
December 1524	The Muslims, with Calicut's approval, make an onslaught on the Kodungallur Jews and Christians. They kill many Jews and drive out the rest to a village to the east. When the fleet attacks Christians, the Nairs of the place retaliate, and drive all Muslims out of Kodungallur.
1525	Henry de Menezes reaches Kannur and executes Bala Hassan. The Kolathiri asks the Viceroy to punish those Muslims who have taken refuge at Dharmapattanam Island. An expedition is organised, and the towns, bazaars and shipping at Dharmapattanam and at Mahe are destroyed.
February–March 1525	A Portuguese navy led by new Viceroy Henry Menezes raids Ponnani and Pantalayini Kollam, and burns the towns. Pantalayini Kollam is defended by 20,000 Nairs and Muslims. On reaching Calicut, he earlier found that the place had been attacked by the Calicut forces. Kutti Ali in retaliation storms the port of Kochi, sets fire to the Portuguese ships, and manages to get away unhindered. The Nairs of the chief of Kurumbranad and Calicut forces invest Fort Calicut (Siege of Calicut). They are helped by a band of Muslims under the command of a European engineer. Kutti Ali's ships blockade the port. Captain Lima, with 300 men, defends the fort.
June 1525	The Zamorin himself marches in with an additional force.
October 1525	The Viceroy arrives with 20 ships and relieves the garrison; the besiegers are driven back. Around 2,000 Calicut men are killed in this effort. The fort is later abandoned and partially destroyed by the Portuguese.
October 1528	Viceroy Sampayo attacks Purakkad, a Calicut ally, and obtains a very rich booty. Kutti Ali is taken prisoner after a battle off Barkur. The Zamorin's fleet suffers severe reverses. Pachachi Marakkar and Ali Ibrahim Marakkar leads the Zamorin's fleet. The first foray of the fleet is against the Portuguese settlement in Ceylon.
1531	Thirty Portuguese ships blockade the Calicut coast. A peace treaty is signed between Nunho de Acunha and the Zamorin of Calicut. Fort Chaliyam, south of Calicut, is constructed. The fort is "like a pistol held at the Zamorin's throat" as it is a strategic site, only 10 km south of Calicut. Kutti Ahmed Ali Marakkar (Marakkar I) is killed. His place is taken up by Marakkar II. Kutti Pokker Ali, son of Kutti Ali, can be identified as the second Marakkar.
1532	Mass conversion of the Paravas of the Pearl Fishery Coast.
1533	The Marakkar raids the Nagipattinam settlement of the Portuguese.
1535	The Portuguese fleet withdraw their forces to face Turkish admiral Suleiman Pasha.
1537	The Portuguese kill Kutti Ibrahim Marakkar. Fort Cranganore is erected.
1538	Mappila leaders Ibrahim and Pattu Marakkar are defeated by the Portuguese at Vedalai.
1539	Calicut enters into an agreement with the Portuguese. The Malabarians again agree to accept the Portuguese "passes". The wedge between the Zamorin and the native Muslims widens.
1540	Pattu Kunjali Marakkar (died c. 1575.) leads the Calicut navy. He is assisted by Ponnani Kutti Pokkar. Chinna Kutti Ali sues for peace with the Portuguese (Goa). The defeat of Ibrahim and Pattu Marakkar and the killing in Ceylon of a third notable was one factor that forced Chinna Kutti Ali to this move.
1542	Afonso de Sousa launches expeditions against Bhatkal, apparently as "anti-Mappila" measure.
1545	The Portuguese assassinate Abu Bakr Ali, the qazi of Kannur.
1550	Battles by Calicut near Kochi. The Portuguese make descents on the coastal towns, particularly on Pantalayini Kollam, destroying mosques and houses, and killing one-third of the inhabitants. The Portuguese manage to reach an accommodation with some Middle Eastern merchants, such as Khoja Shams ud-Din Gilani of Kannur.
1552	The Zamorin receive assistance in heavy guns landed at Ponnani, brought there by Yoosuf, a Turk who sailed against the monsoon.
1555	Peace between the Zamorin and the Portuguese on the condition that "passes" should be taken by traders.
1557–1559	Muslims of North Malabar begin hostilities, and then make the usual submission and agree to take out the "passes". The Muslim sailors come under enormous pressure under these stringent measures. The Muslims organise in small fleets of boats to engage with the Portuguese shipping. The Portuguese continue hostilities against the Zamorin and the Malabarians.
1560	The Inquisition is established at Goa.
1564	The Portuguese are besieged in their fort at Kannur, but the attack is repulsed.
1564	The Zamorin and his Muslim allies attack the Kochi chief at or near Kodungallur. Two Kochi princes are killed in the engagement. The Portuguese enlarge and strengthen the Fort Cranganore. Jews finally desert Anchuvannam and migrate to Kochi. They reside within the fort limits.
1566	Kutti Poker of Ponnani captures a Portuguese ship.
1567	Jew's Town is built, and the Jews in a body moved into the town from the Kochi fort limits.
1569	Kutti Poker of Ponnani captures a second Portuguese ship. Around 1000 Portuguese sailors from these ships are killed.
1569	Kutti Poker makes a successful raid on Mangalore Fort. His fleet falls in with a Portuguese fleet as he is returning south off Cannnanore, and he and all his sailors are killed. Zamorin of Calicut forms alliances with rulers of Ahmadnagar and Bijapur.
1571	Siege of Fort Chaliyam. The Zamorin is assisted by the naval forces of Marakkar III (Pattu Kunjali Marakkar).
September 1571	Fort Chaliyam surrenders to Calicut. The Zamorin destroys the fort.
1572	Chaliyam is burnt by the Portuguese.
1573	Parappanangadi town is burnt by the Portuguese. Pattu Kunjali Marakkar (Marakkar III) obtains permission from Zamorin to build a fortress and dockyard at Puthupattanam (Kottakkal). This fort later came to be called "Fort Marakkar"."The rise in Ponnani of Pattu Kunjali Marakkar appeared to have signalled a real threat to rulers such as the Kolathiri and the Samoothiri as much as to the Portuguese." – Sanjay Subrahmanyam in "The Political Economy of Commerce: Southern India 1500–1650", Cambridge University Press (2002)
1577	The fleet of Muslim ships, carrying rice, is seized by the Portuguese and 3000 sailors are killed.
1578	Peace negotiations between Calicut and the Portuguese. The Zamorin refuses to agree to construct a fort at Ponnani.
1579	The Zamorin visits Kodungallur. The Portuguese continue hostilities against the Zamorin and the Malabarians. The rice embargo results in the Famine of 1579.
1584	Calicut shifts policy towards the Portuguese because of his estrangement with the Marakkar who begins to defy the Zamorin. Treaty of peace with Viceroy Mascarenhas. He sanctions the Portuguese to build a factory at Ponnani. The decision is much resented by the Marakkars, and they strengthen Fort Marakkar.
1591	Zamorin allows the Portuguese to build a factory at Calicut. He lays the foundation of the church, granting them the necessary land and building materials.
1595	Possible date of the succession of Marakkar IV (Ponnani Muhammed Kunjali Marakkar). Another date in the 1570s a few years after the erection Fort Marakkar is also proposed. Muhammed is probably the nephew of the third Marakkar.
1597	The Zamorin has grown nervous about the royal pretensions of the Marakkar. The Marakkar has styled himself "King of Muslims" and "Lord of the Indian Seas". Father Franciso de Costa is sent to Calicut. Agreement between the Zamorin and the Portuguese on Marakkar IV. The allies decide to proceed together against Fort Marakkar – the Calicut forces by land the Portuguese by sea.
1599	Forcible subjection of the Syrian church to Rome at the Synod of Diamper. The Archbishop of Goa, Alexis Menezis, visits Kottakkal in 1599. (First) Siege of Fort Kottakkal (Fort Marakkar) from land by the Calicut forces alone. The siege ends in a frustrating defeat of the Calicut forces. Marakkar IV calls himself "Defender of Islam" and the "Expeller of the Portuguese". Treaty between the Zamorin of Calicut and the Portuguese. He declares that he would from then on cease persecuting Christians, permit the erection of churches in the kingdom of Calicut, support the Synod of Diamper, release all Christian prisoners, and provide spices for the ships of the Portuguese at the usual prices. In return the Portuguese agree to grant him "cartazes" every year for ships bound for Jiddah, Bengal, Aceh and the Canara. Most importantly the Zamorin anticipate their help in a joint attack on Kunjali Marakkar's fort at Ponnani.
1600	(Second) Siege of Fort Marakkar by the combined forces of the Portuguese (under Andre Furtado) and the Zamorin of Calicut. The assault on the fort is begun by the Nair force consisting of 6,000 men. The Portuguese execute Marakkar IV, who surrendered in person to the Zamorin, at Goa. The Zamorin took over Fort Marakkar and the town of Kottakkal. The relations between the Zamorin and the Portuguese again reverts.

=== Relations with the Dutch and English ===
In 1602, the Zamorin sent messages to Aceh, where the Verenigde Zeeuwsche Compagnie had a factory, promising the Dutch a fort at Calicut if they would come and trade there. Two factors, Hans de Wolff and Lafer, were sent on an Asian ship from Aceh, but the two were captured by the chief of Tanur, and handed over to the Portuguese. These men were later hanged in Goa.

A Dutch fleet under Admiral Steven van der Hagen arrived in Calicut in November 1604. It marked the beginning of the Dutch presence in Kerala and they concluded a treaty with Calicut on 11 November 1604. By this time the kingdom and the port of Calicut was much reduced in importance, which was also the first treaty that the Dutch East India Company made with an Indian ruler. The treaty provided for a mutual alliance between the two to expel the Portuguese from Malabar. In return the Dutch East India Company was given facilities for trade at Calicut and Ponnani, including spacious storehouses.

The Dutch, some fifteen years after the Zamorin first asked for help, had promised much and delivered almost nothing. The Zamorin finally turned to the English. In September 1610, the English factors at Mocha were approached by the head of the Mappilas there to their shipping in the region from the Portuguese fleets.

The arrival of British in Kerala can be traced back to the year 1615, when a group under the leadership of Captain William Keeling arrived at Kozhikode, using three ships. It was in these ships that Sir Thomas Roe went to visit Jahangir, the fourth Mughal emperor, as British envoy. The British concluded a treaty of trade (1616) under which, among others, the English were to assist Calicut in expelling the Portuguese from Fort Kochi and Fort Cranganore. The English set up a factory at Calicut, and a factor, George Woolman, is sent there with a stock of presents. But the Zamorin soon found the English as unreliable as the Dutch where military aid was concerned. The factory was wound up in March, 1617.

Later in 1661, Calicut joined a coalition led by the Dutch to defeat the Portuguese and Kochi and conducted a number of successful campaigns. Travancore became the most dominant state in Kerala by defeating the powerful Zamorin of Kozhikode in the battle of Purakkad in 1755. As a result of the Kew Letters, the Dutch settlements on the Malabar Coast were surrendered to the British in 1795 in order to prevent them being overrun by the French. Dutch Malabar remained with the British after the conclusion of the Anglo-Dutch Treaty of 1814, which traded the colony with Bangka Island.

== Mysore occupation and decline ==
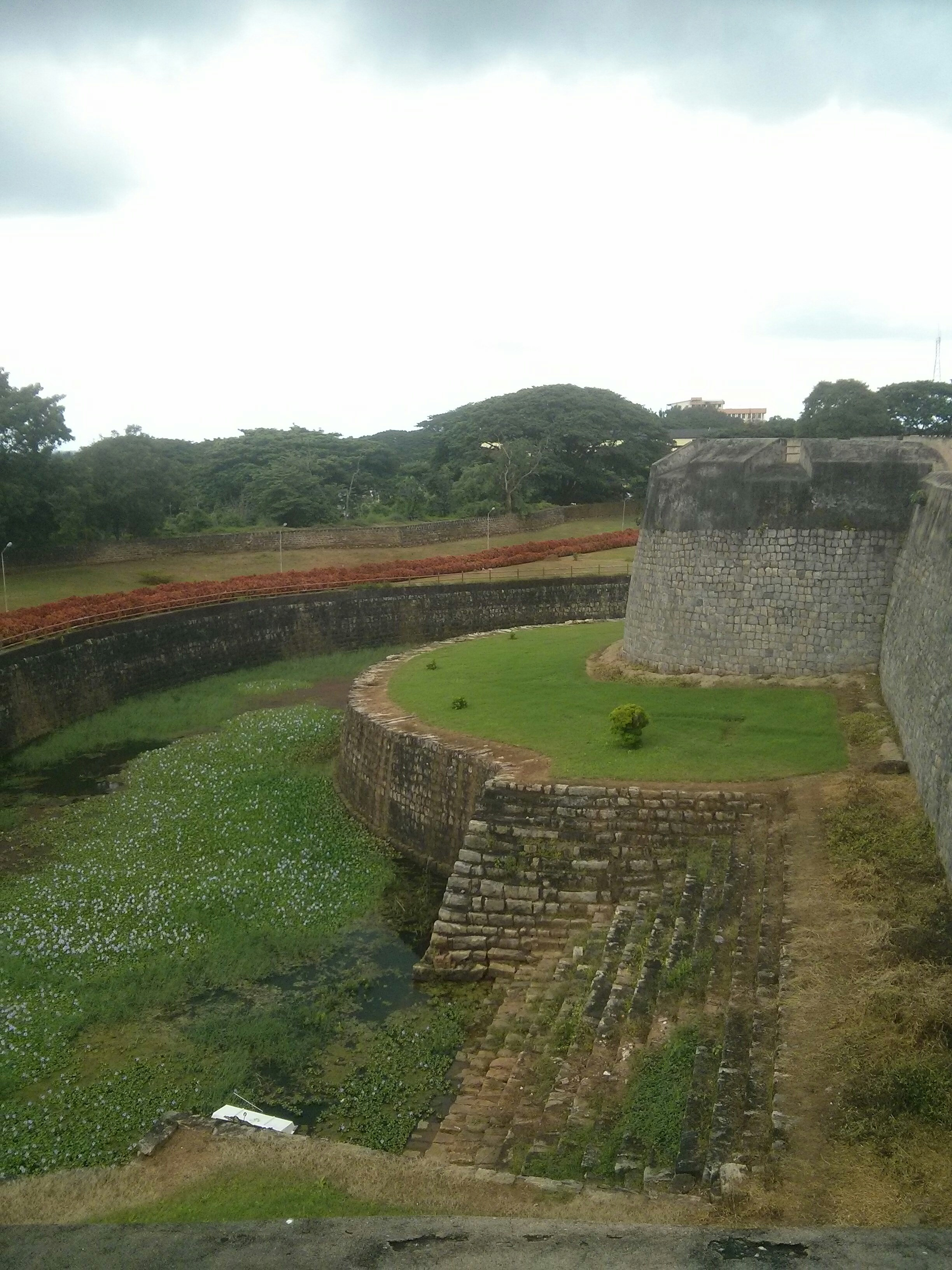
Palghat Fort

It was in 1732, at the invitation of the chief of Palakkad, that Mysore forces marched to Kerala for the first time. They appeared again in 1735, and in 1737 they raided the Zamorin's frontier outposts. In 1745, the Mysore forces fought three battles with the Calicut warriors. In 1756 they invaded Calicut for the fifth time. The chief of Palakkad had placed himself under the protection of the King of Mysore, agreeing to pay an annual tribute of 12,000 fanams. The Faujdar of Dindigul, Hyder Ali, sent Mukhdam Sahib, with 2000 cavalry, 5,000 infantry, and 5 guns to Kerala. The Zamorin tried to buy off the enemy by promising (Treaty, 1756) to refrain from molesting Palakkad and pay 12 lakh rupees for the expenses of the expedition. However the Zamorin was unable pay anything to Hyder Ali.

In 1766, 12,000 Mysore forces under Hyder Ali marched to Malabar from Mangalore. Mysore's intentions were made easy by the help they received from the Muslims in Malabar. Ali Raja of Kannur, a Muslim ruler in northern Kerala, also helped the invading forces. Thiyyar formed part of the army of the Zamorin of Calicut, which fought against Hyder Ali and Tipu Sultan. The Zamorin bestowed upon Thiyya army head of the Cherayi Panicker. The Mysore army conquered northern Kerala up to Kochi with relative ease. Hyder Ali inflicted a major setback on the Calicut warriors at Perinkolam Ferry on the Kotta River. As Mysore edged closer to the outer reaches of the city of Calicut, the Zamorin sent most of his relatives to safe haven in Ponnani, and from there to Travancore, and to avoid the humiliation of surrender committed self-immolation by setting fire to his palace at Mananchira (27 April). Hyder Ali absorbed Malabar district to his state.

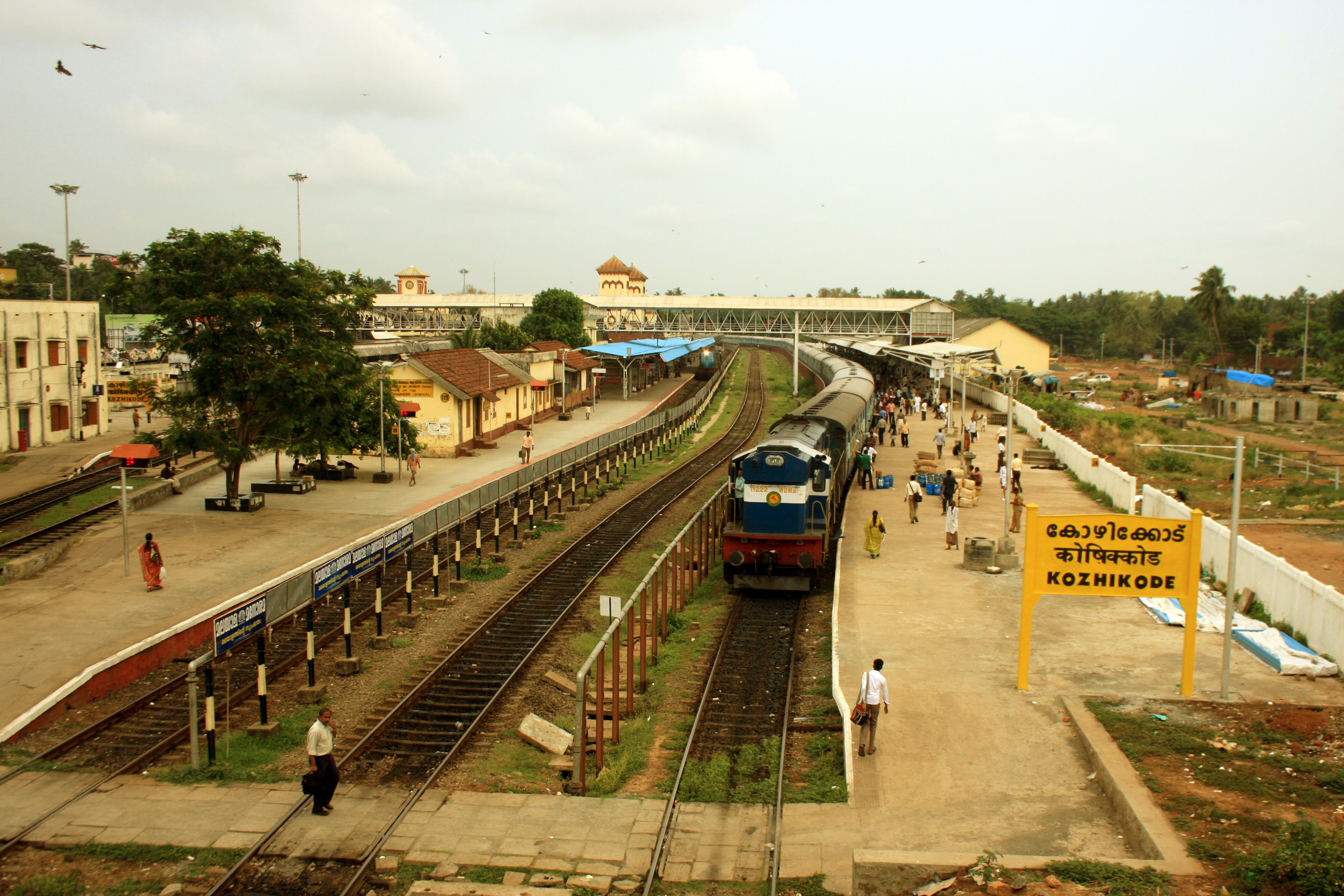
Calicut Railway Station was established during the Colonial rule

But as soon as the Haider Ali marched to Coimbatore, Nair rebellions broke out in Malabar. Some members of the Zamorin family rebelled against the Muslim occupiers. This included the Eralpadu Krishna Varma with his nephew Ravi Varma. The princes were aided by the British East India Company. In 1768 the Zamorin prince was restored in Calicut, agreeing to pay an annual tribute to Mysore. For nearly six years till 1774 nothing was heard about Hyder Ali. In 1774, Mysore forces under Srinivasa Rao occupied the city of Calicut. The prince retired to Travancore in a native vessel. The baton of resistance now passed to his nephew Ravi Varma. Ravi Varma helped the Company occupy Calicut in 1782. By the Treaty of Mangalore, concluded in 1784, Malabar was restored to Mysore. In 1785 the oppression of revenue officers led to a rebellion by the Mappilas of Manjeri. As a reward for aiding to put down the rebels, and partly as an incentive, Tipu Sultan settled upon Ravi Varma a pension and a jaghir in 1786. The peace was soon broken and Tipu sent 6,000 troops under Mon. Lally to Kerala.

Lord Cornwallis invited the Kerala chiefs to join him in 1790, promising to render them in future entirely independent of Mysore and to retain them upon reasonable terms under the protection of the company. Prince Ravi Varma met General Meadows at Trichinopoly and settled with him the terms of the Calicut's cooperation. After the Third Mysore War (1790–1792), Malabar was placed under the control of the company by the Treaty of Seringapatam.

In the settlement negotiations with the Joint Commission in 1792, the Zamorin proved recalcitrant. To pressure him, a portion of his former territories (Payyanadu, Payyormala, Kizhakkumpuram, Vadakkampuram and Pulavayi) was leased to the ruler of Kurumburanadu as manager for the East India Company. Finally, after prolonged negotiations, the hereditary territory of the Zamorin, together with the coin mint and the sea customs, was leased back to him. He was also temporarily given jurisdiction over the petty rulers and, as a mark of the Zamorin's exceptional position in Malabar, the revenue fixed for Beypore, Parappanadu and Vettattunadu was to be paid through him. As previously noted, these tax-payment and jurisdictional arrangements were terminated later and the Zamorin of Calicut became a mere pensioned landlord receiving the "malikhana". On 1 July 1800, Malabar was transferred to the Madras Presidency. On 15 November 1806 the agreement upon which rested the future political relations between the Zamorin of Calicut and the English was executed.

== Governance ==
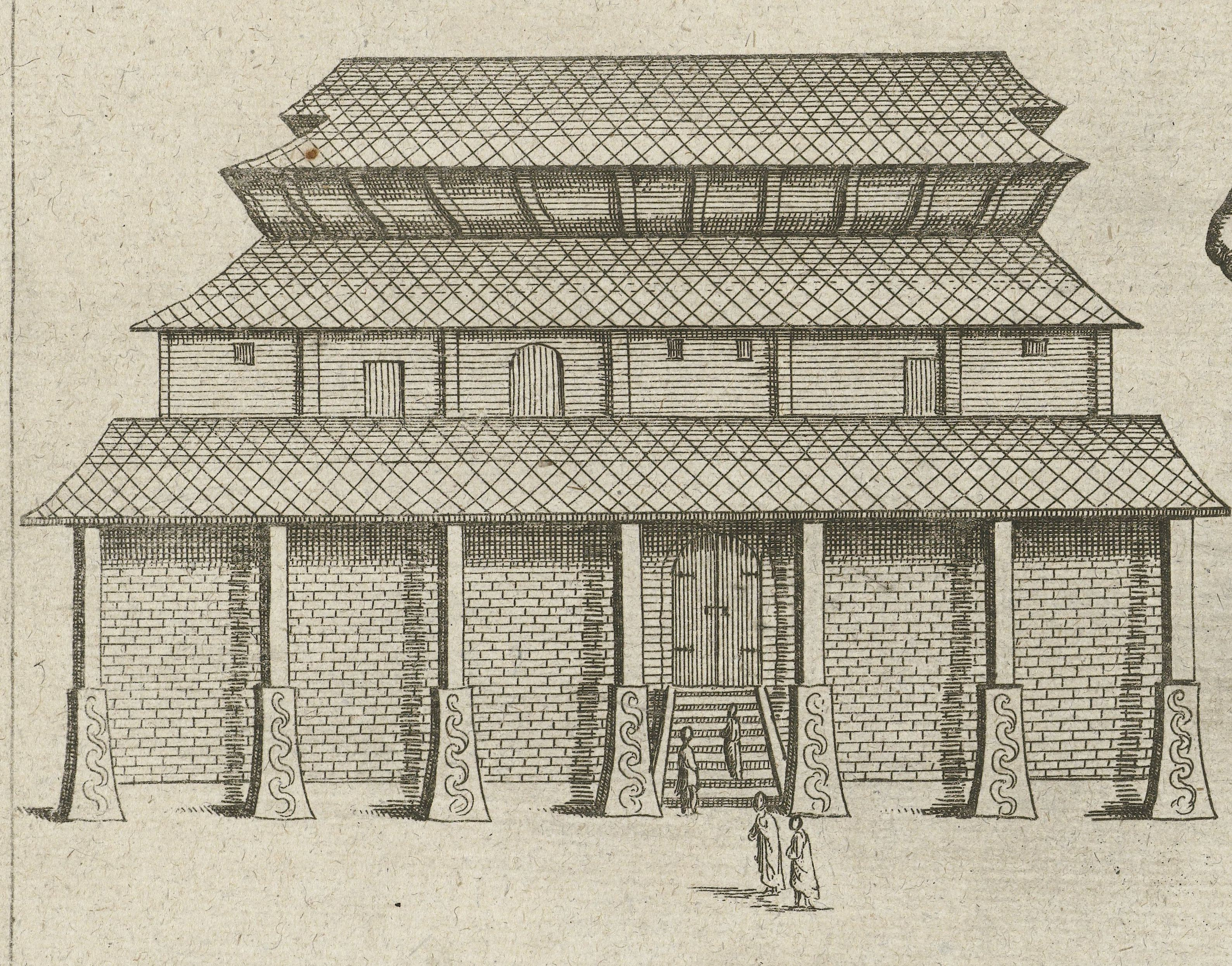
The Palace of the Zamorin of Calicut in 17th century – from Dutch archives

According to historian M. G. Raghava Varier, at the peak of their reign, the Zamorin's ruled over a region from Kollam to Panthalayini Kollam (Koyilandy). The hereditary local chiefs, more or less independent in their region, acknowledged the over-lordship of the Zamorin in Calicut. The local magnates – conferred with privileges and titles by the Zamorin – were more dependent on Calicut. In times of battles the chiefs and magnates provided the warriors to the Zamorin and were protected in turn when an enemy made encroachment to their dominions.

Some of the local chiefs had the investiture ceremony, rather similar to that of the Zamorin of Calicut, some claimed kshatriya status, and some of them even used the title "Raja". Vettam Udaya Mootha Kovil, Thirumanassheri Namboothiri, Thalappalli Punnathoor Nambadi, Thalappalli Kakkattu Nambadi, Vannilassheri Padinjare Nambadi, Parappur Karippuva Kovil, Chittoor Namboothirippadu, Manakkulathil Mooppil, Parappur Valavil Kovil, Parappur Kayyavil Kovil, Venginnadu Nambadi, Kurumburanadu Madampu Unithiri were some of the local chiefs of the kingdom of Calicut.

K. V. Krishna Iyer, the court historian in Kozhikode, explains;

Apart from the southern half of Kurumburanadu, Payyanadu, Polanadu, Ponnani, Cheranadu, Venkadakkotta, Malappuram, Kappul, Mannarakkadu, Karimpuzha, Nedunganadu, Naduvattom, Kollangode, Koduvayur, and Mankara the kingdom of Kozhikode included the following territories as tributary polities: Kottayam, Payyormala, Pulavayi, Tanore, Chaliyam, Beypore, Parappanadu, Thirunavaya, Thalapalli-Kakkad, Thalapalli-Punnathoor, Chittoor, Chavakkad, Kavalappara, Edappally, Patinjattedam, Cranganore, Kollengodu, Cochin and all of its vassal polities, Paravur, Purakkad, Vadakkumkur, Tekkumkur, Kayamkulam and Quilon.

The kingdom only included the following territories during the late 18th century:

Payyanadu, Polanadu, Ponnani, Cheranadu, Venkattakkotta, Malappuram, Kappul, Mannarkkad, Karimpuzha, and Nedunganadu. The Zamorin claimed to be – with more or less influence – the paramount sovereign over Payyormala, Pulavayi, Beypore, Parappanadu, Tanore, Talapalli, Chavakkadu and Kavalappara. Kozhikode had also taken possession of the more full and immediate sovereignty over Kollangode-Venginnadu, Koduvayur and Mankara.

The Zamorin was assisted in the work of government in Calicut by four hereditary chief ministers called "Sarvadhi Karyakkar" and number of ministers called "Karyakkar" and "Polttis". The Karyakkar were appointed and removed by the Zamorin. Adhikaris, Thalachennavars, Achanmar and temple functionaries also belonged to the Polttis. There were ritual specialists like Hindu priests of the palaces, astrologers etc. as well as various occupational groups like physicians, weavers, and militiamen all of whom were attached to the royal establishment.

=== Sarvadhi Karyakkar ===
- Mangattachan – the prime minister
- Tinayancheri Elayatu
- Dharmothu Panikkar – the instructor-in-arms who commanded the Calicut forces
- Varakkal Paranambi – treasury and accounts
- Ramachan Nedungadi

=== Shahbandar Koya ===
Although the Zamorin of Calicut derived greater part of his revenue from taxing the Indian Ocean spice trade, but he still did not run a fully developed mercantilist state. The Zamorins left trade in the hands of Paradesi (Middle Eastern) and Kerala Muslims.

Shahbandar Koya (sometimes Khwaja, popularly known as the "Koya of Kozhikode") was a privileged administrative position in Calicut. The Shahbandar was the second most important official in most Asian polities after the ruler. Trade at the port of Calicut was controlled by this Muslim merchant-cum-port commissioner. He supervised customs on the behalf of the king, fixed the prices of the commodities, and collected the share to the treasury. As the farmer of customs he also had right collect brokerage and poll tax at the port.

According to tradition, it was a merchant from Muscat, Oman who induced to the Zamorin to the conquer Valluvanadu. The Koya was subsequently appointed as the "Shahbandar" by the Zamorin of Calicut. He is also given "all the privileges and dignities of a Nair chief, jurisdiction over all the Muslims residing in the bazaar of Calicut, the right to receive a present from the Ilavar (the Tiyyar), the Kammalar (the smiths, carpenters, stone workers etc.) and the Mukkuvar whenever the Zamorin conferred any honours on them on ceremonial occasions".

=== Revenue and trade ===
The major sources of revenue for the kingdom of Calicut were:

- Taxing trade via ports
- Cherikkal lands (royal estates, agricultural lands owned by the Zamorin)
- Amkam (fee for permitting to hold a trial by battle)
- Chunkam (tolls and duties)
- Ela (proceeds of lands confiscated)
- Kola (forced contribution for emergencies)
- Tappu (mulets/unconditional offences)
- Pizha (fines)
- Purushantaram (vassal succession fee)
- Pulyatta pennu (the proceeds from the sale of out-cast women) etc.
- Tirumulkalcha (gifts on various occasions)
- Virinnamittu panam (amount for the royal feast)
- Kannukku panam (amount presented for the death rituals) etc.

The Zamorin of Calicut derived greater part of his revenues by taxing spice trade. Trade – both coastal and overseas – was dominated the Muslims, though Jews, Chettis from Coromandel Coast, and Vanias from Gujarat all traded in and from Calicut. The Muslim traders included natives (Mappilas and Marakkars) as well as Muslims from the Middle East. The foreigners dominated the lucrative Indian Ocean spice trade.

The goods carried across the Arabian Sea included spices – pepper, ginger and cardamom – and trans-shipped textiles, and coconut products. The import into Calicut consisted of gold and copper, silver, horses (Kannur especially), silk, various aromatics, and other minor items. The Indian coastal trade network encompassed commodities such as coconuts, coir, pepper, cardamom, cinnamon and rice. Rice was a major import item into the kingdom of Calicut from Canara and Coromandel Coast. Low-value but high-volume trade in foodstuffs that passed through the Gulf of Mannar was also handled by the native Muslims from Malabar Coast. The local people were suppliers and consumers of goods in Kozhikde ports.

Maritime corridor	Nature	Dominant community
West Asia – Malabar Coast (Red Sea, and the Persian Gulf)	International / overseas	Muslims from the Middle East
East Asia – Malabar Coast (Pegu, Mergui, and Melaka in Myanmar and Malaysia and points east)	International / overseas	Native Muslims (Mappilas and Marakkars)
East Coast of India – Malabar Coast (Canara, Coromandel Coast and Bay of Bengal shores) and Maldives, and Ceylon	Domestic / coastal	Native Muslims (Mappilas and Marakkars), and Chettis from Coromandel Coast
Gujarat – Malabar Coast	Domestic / coastal	Muslims, and Vanias from Gujarat
Malabar coastal	Domestic / coastal	Muslims – Mappilas

The coins minted in Calicut included Panam (made of gold), Taram (made of silver) and Kasu (made of copper). The officer in-charge of the mint was called the "Goldsmith of Manavikraman". The royal mint was destroyed in 1766.

- 16 Kasu = 1 Taram
- 1 Taram = 1 Portuguese Real (Approx.)
- 16 Tarams = 1 Panam

Ma Haun's Table (1409)
- 1 Kochi Panam = 15 Tarams
Holzschuher's Table (1503)
Gold coins:
- Calicut/Kannur/Kochi Panam (15 carats gold)
  - 19 Panams = 1 cruzado (Portuguese) or ducat (European)
- Kollam Panam (19 carats gold)
  - 12 Panams = 1 cruzado (Portuguese) or ducat (European)
Silver coins:
- [All Malabar Coast] Taram
  - 16 Tarams = 1 Panam
Copper coins:
- Kollam Kasu
  - 15 Kasus = 1 Panam

Coins in circulation in the pre-Portuguese kingdom of Calicut included gold coins called Pagoda/Pratapa, silver Tangas of Gujarat, of Bijapur, of Vijayanagara and the Larines of Persia, Xerafins of Cairo, the Venetian and the Genoan ducats. Other coins in circulation in the kingdom of Calicut – in sometime or other – included Riyal ("Irayal"), Dirhma ("Drama"), Rupee ("Uruppika"), Rasi ("Rachi"), and Venadu Chakram. Venadu coins – it seems – came to circulation after the Mysorean interlude.

Rasi later gave way to the Kaliyuga Rayan Panam. Of Kaliyuga Rayan Panam there were two varieties. One of these (issued by Kannur) was afterwards imitated by the Zamorin called Virarayan Putiya Panam, to distinguish it from the coin of Kannur, which then became Pazhaya Panam. The four Pazhaya Panams made a Rupee while three and half Putiya Panams equalled a Rupee.

== Military ==
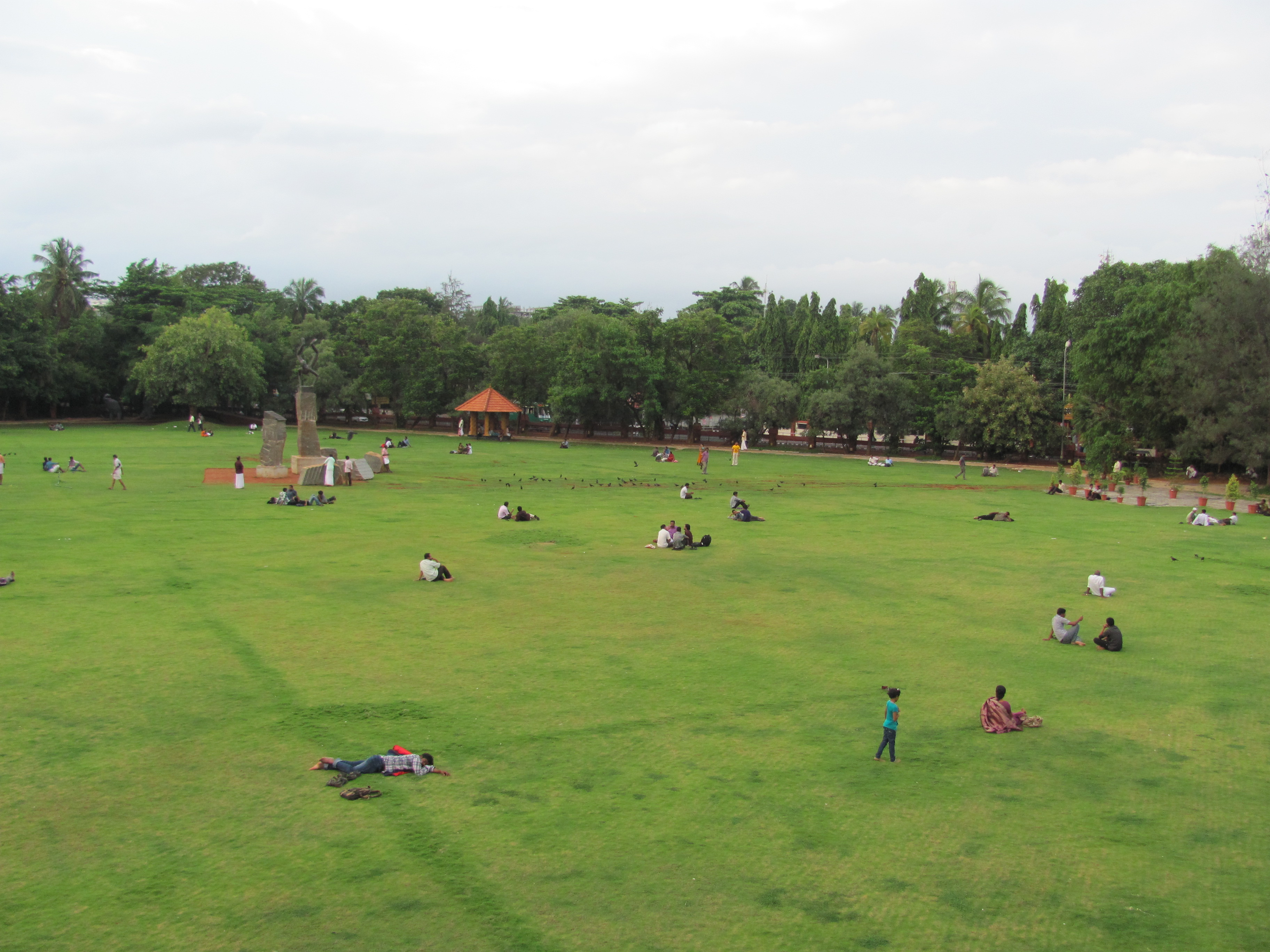
Present day location of the Mananchira Palace. The Fort and Palace were destroyed by Tipu Sultan in the 18th century

Calicut's attitude towards the vanquished chiefs and European governors was generally marked by moderation. The whole conquered area was not ruled directly from Calicut but was ruled by a Calicut official (general, minister or Eradi prince). Sometimes, its former rulers allowed to rule as a vassal or feudatory.

Calicut forces consisted mainly of feudal levies, brought by the vassal rulers and chiefs. The former were divided into five classes (Commanders of the Five Thousand, of the Thousand, of the Five Hundred, of the Three Hundred, and of the Hundred). Standing armies were kept at strategic locations like Calicut, Ponnani, Chavakkad, Chunganadu etc. Dharmottu Panikkar – the instructor in arms – commanded the warriors. The nominal cavalry was commanded by the Kuthiravattattu Nair. Nair militia was slow moving as compared to the cavalry, and always fought on foot. Dharmoth Panicker, Cherayi Panicker and were also important Army heads in the Samoothiri army.

The use of firearms and balls had been known before the advent of the Portuguese. The Mappilas formed the main corps of musketeers, led by Thinayancheri Elayathu.

=== Kunjali Marakkars ===
The Kunjali Marakkars effectively functioned the admiral of the fleet of the Calicut Zamorin in the 16th century. The Mappila seamen were famous for their naval guerrilla warfare and hand-to-hand fighting on board. The Mappila vessels, small, lightly armed, and highly mobile, were a major threat to the Portuguese shipping all along the Indian west coast. But the Mappila artillery was inferior, and the vessels were incapable of large scale joint/organised operations. Merchants drew Mappila corsairs and used them to transport the spices past Portuguese blockades.

Historians speculate that the Marakkars were primarily suppliers of food materials from the ports of the Coromandel Coast and spices from interior Kerala and Sri Lanka. Some assume that the Marakkars, before the beginning of the hostilities with the Portuguese, were traders of rice from Konkan. One Ismail Marakkar seems to be a prominent rice trader in Kochi. During the early years of Portuguese presence in Kerala the native Muslim merchants of Kochi – such as Cherina/Karine Mecar (Karim Marakkar), Mamale (Muhammed) Marakkar, Mitos Marakkarm, Nino Marakkar, Ali Apule, Coje Mappila and Abraham Mappila etc. – acted as spice suppliers for them. The Marakkars also supplied food materials for the Portuguese settlements in Kerala. Mamale Marakkar of Cochin was the richest man in the country. These traders, along with the other big Mappila, and Syrian Christian merchants, also acted as brokers and intermediaries in the purchase of spices and in the sale of the goods brought from Europe.

It was the commercial Interests of the Portuguese private traders in Cochin that came into the conflict with Mappilas and the (Tamil) Maraikkayar traders. By the 1520s, open confrontations between the Portuguese and the Mappilas, in southern India and in western Sri Lanka, became a common occurrence. After a series of naval battles, the once powerful Chinna Kutti Ali was forced to sue for peace with the Portuguese in 1540. The peace was soon broken, with the assassination of the Muslim judge of Kannur Abu Bakr Ali (1545), and the Portuguese again came down hard on the Mappilas. By the end of the 16th century, the Portuguese were finally able to deal with the "Mappila challenge". Kunjali Marakkar IV was defeated and killed, with the help of the Zamorin, in c. 1600. Even after the execution of Marakkar IV, the title of the Kunjali Marakkar continued to exist for almost century.

The four key Kunjali Marakkars were:

- Kutti Ahmed Ali (Marakkar I)
- Kutti Pokker Ali (Marakkar II)
- Pattu Kunjali Marakkar (Marakkar III)
- Ponnani Muhammed Kunjali (Marakkar IV)

== List of Calicut Zamorins ==
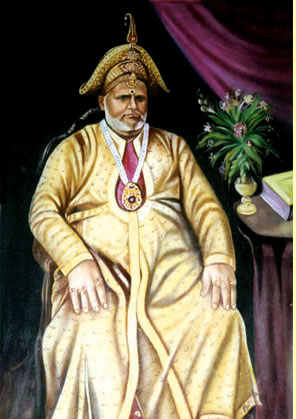
Zamorin of Calicut (1868–1892). In 1766 Haider Ali of Mysore defeated the Zamorin of Calicut and absorbed Malabar district to his state. After the Third Mysore War (1790–1792), Malabar was placed under the control of the British East India company. Later the status of the Zamorins as independent rulers was changed to that of pensioners of the company.

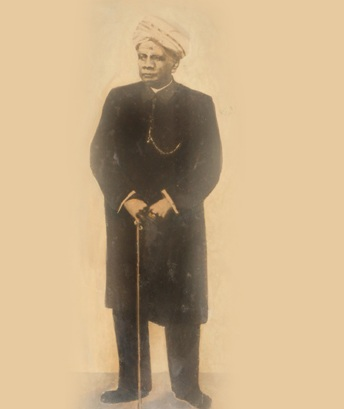
K. C. Manavedan Raja (1932–1937)

Historical documents rarely mentions the individual names of the Zamorins of Calicut. Mana Vikrama, Mana Veda and Vira Raya were the only names given to male members in the royal family, the Zamorin always being known as Manavikrama. Mana Veda might be a corruption of the Old Malayalam title "Mana Viyata". Portuguese historian Diogo de Couto was the first to attempt the construction of chronological scheme.

The following is a list of rulers of Calicut from "The Zamorins of Calicut" (1938) by K. V. Krishna Iyer. The first column (No.) gives the number of the Zamorin reckoned from the founder of the ruling family, based upon de Couto's assumption that there had been 98 Zamorins before the Zamorin reigning in 1610.

=== First dynasty ===
The original seat of the aristocratic clan was Nediyiruppu and the head of the house was known as Nediyiruppu Mutta Eradi, a title enjoyed by the fifth in rank from the Zamorin. Under the Kodungallur Chera rulers the Mutta Eradi governed Ernad with the title of "Ernad Utaiyar". Later the clan abandoned its ancestral house and transferred its residence to the present day Kozhikode.

No. of Zamorin	Name	Reign	Important events
1	Mana Vikrama (Manikkan)	1124-?	The legendary founder of the ruling family.
27		8 years	Kozhikode city is established
65	Rama Varma Kulashekhara	1339–1347	Ibn Battuta at Kozhikode (1342–1347)
73	Raja Raja Varma	1402–1410	Ma Huan at Kozhikode (1403)
78		1442–1450	The visits of Abdur Razzak (1442) and Niccolò de' Conti (1444)
81	Mana Vikrama the Great	1466–1474	Athanasius Nikitin (1468–1474) visits Kozhikode.
82	Mana Veda	1474–1482	
84	Manavikraman Raja (Mankurussi)	1495–1500	The arrival of Vasco da Gama (1498)
85		1500–1513	The occupations of Kochi (1503–1504)
86		1513–1522	Treaty with Portuguese (1513), and the erection of the Portuguese fort at Calicut (1514)
87		1522–1529	The expulsion of Portuguese from Calicut
88		1529–1531	The building of Portuguese fort at Chaliyam (1531)
89		1531–1540	Battles with the Portuguese
90		1540–1548	Treaty with Portuguese (1540)
91		1548–1560	Adoption of the chief of Bardela (150) and the battles with the Portuguese.
92	Vira Raya	1560–1562	
93	Mana Vikrama	1572–1574	The expulsion of the Portuguese from Chaliyam (1571)
94		1574–1578	Battles with the Portuguese
95		1578–1588	The Portuguese allowed a factory at Ponnani (1584)
96		1588–1597	The settlement of the Portuguese at Calicut (1591)
97		1597–1599	Battles with Marakkar (1598–1599)
98		1599–1604	Capture of Marakkar's stronghold (1600)
99		1604–1617	Siege of Cannanore (1604–1617) and treaties with the Dutch (1604 and 1608) and the English (1615)
100	Mana Vikrama	1617–1627	
101		1627–1630	
102		1630–1637	
103	Mana Vikrama (Saktan Tampuran)	1637–1648	The uncle of the author of the Krishnanatakam
104	Tiruvonam Tirunal	1648–1655	
105	Mana Veda	1655–1658	The author of the Krishnanatakam
106	Asvati Tirunal	1658–1662	The expulsion of the Portuguese from Kodungallur (1662)
107	Puratam Tirunal	1662–1666	The expulsion of Portuguese from Kochi (1663)
108		1666–1668	Battles with the Dutch
109		1668–1671	The destruction of the Cheraman Sword
110	Uttrattati Tirunal	1671–1684	Cession of Chetwai to the Dutch
111	Bharani Tirunal Mana Vikrama	1684–1705	The terror of the Dutch. Two Mamankams (1694 and 1695)
112	Nileswaram Tirunal	1705–1711	Adoptions from Nileswaram (1706 and 1707)
113	Vira Raya	1711–1729	The Dutch War (1715–1718)
114	Mana Vikrama	1729–1741	

Note: Italic names only indicate the asterism under which the Zamorin is born

=== Second dynasty ===
It seems that the original ruling family came to an end with the 114th Zamorin of Calicut. The 115th Zamorin, the first of the second ruling family, was the oldest of the princes adopted from Nileshwaram in 1706.

No. of Zamorin	Name	Reign	Important events
115	Zamorin from Kilakke Kovilakam	1741–1746	
116	Putiya Kovilakam	1746–1758	The Dutch War (1753–1758)
117	Kilakke Kovilakam	1758–1766	Battles with Travancore and the invasion of Mysore, committed suicide. Annexed by Mysore.
118	Putiya Kovilakam	1766–1788	
119	Kerala Varma Vikrama (Putiya Kovilakam)	1788–1798	Treaty of Seringapatam (1792)
120	Krishna Varma (Putiya Kovilakam)	1798–1806	Agreement of 1806 with EIC (died in 1816)

== Zamorin family today ==
"Kerala had many royal families which together may have more than 10,000 descendants. The Kochi family alone has more than 600. All these families had properties taken over by governments without compensation. Many of them are living in penury now. Shouldn't the state pay pensions to all of them then?"

— K. K. N. Kurup

Historians say any special treatment to the Zamorins would be against the [Indian] Constitution, which does not grant any privilege on the basis of birth. M. G. S. Narayanan says the Zamorins have not donated any property to the state. "The Zamorin's family had fled from Calicut when Hyder Ali from Mysore invaded Calicut in 1766. When defeat was imminent, the Zamorin committed suicide and set fire to the palace," he says. "That led to Calicut falling into the hands of [Hyder] Ali, his son Tipu Sultan and finally the British [Company] by 1792. The Zamorins had lost all their property by the time they were allowed to return to Calicut by 1800."

— M. G. S. Narayanan

The Zamorins of Calicut returned to Calicut from Travancore by 1800. During the British rule, Malabar's chief importance laid in producing pepper. The company reduced the Zamorins to the position of "pensioned" landlord by giving them an annual payment called mali khana. Payments (Mali khana) were taken over by the government of India after independence in 1947. The royal family has been trying to get a pension from the various governments over fifty years. The Kerala government decided to award a monthly pension to members of the royal family in 2013.

At present the Zamorin of Calicut is trustee to 46 Hindu temples (under Malabar Devaswom Board, as Madras H. R & C. E Act 1956) in northern Kerala, including five special grade temples, which generate a substantial revenue. The Zamorin also has a permanent seat on the Guruvayur Sree Krishna Temple's managing committee. Zamorin's high school – situated overlooking the Tali temple – was established in 1877 and the family manages the Zamorin's Guruvayurappan College.

The family has sought the government's help to preserve the artefacts in their private collection. This collection include palm leaf manuscripts, swords, shields and other valuables. Malabar Devaswom Board Commissioner recently proposed to the Kerala state government that the temples under the hereditary (private) trustees – such as the Zamorin – should be attached to the Board.

The general administration department data tabled in the Kerala assembly reveals that since 2013, 876 members of Kozhikode Zamorin royal family received a total of Rs 19.51 crore in family and political pensions. This is apart from the pension titled Malikhan being provided to the members of royal families of former princely states of Malabar (part of British India) by the Centre

== See also ==
- Kolathunadu
- Kingdom of Cochin (Kochi)
- Travancore
- Siege of Chaliyam

== Sources ==
- H. A. R. Gibb, Ed., Ibn Battuta- Travels in Asia and Africa 1325–1354, New Delhi, Reprint 1986,
- M. L. Dames, Ed., The Book of Duarte Barbosa, Vol. II, (1812), New Delhi, Reprint 1989,
- Lieut. M. J. Rawlandson, Ed. & Trans., Tohfut ul Mujahideen, London, 1833
- Hermann Gundert, Ed., Keralotpatti, in Scaria Zacharia, Ed., Keralotpattiyum Mattum, Kottayam, 1992.
- Albert Gray, Ed., The Voyage of Francois Pyrard of Laval, Vol. I, (1887), New Delhi, Reprint 2000
- William Logan, Malabar, Vol. I, (1887), Madras, Reprint 1951
  - Kesavan Veluthat, 'Logan's Malabar: Text and Context' in William Logan, Malabar, Vol. I, (1887), Thiruvananthapuram, 2000
- K. M. Panikkar, A History of Kerala (1498–1801), Annamalainagar, 1960.
- P. K. S. Raja, Medieval Kerala, (1953), Calicut, 1966.
- A. Sreedhara Menon, A Survey of Kerala History, (1967), Madras, 1991
- N. M. Nampoothiri, Samutiri Caritrattile Kanappurangal, Sukapuram, 1987
- M. G. S. Narayanan, Perumals of Kerala, Calicut. 1996.
- S.F. Dale, The Mappilas of Malabar 1498–1922: Islamic Society on the South Asian Frontier, Oxford, 1980
- Kesavan Veluthat, Brahman Settlements in Kerala: Historical Studies, Calicut, 1978.
- Genevieve Bouchon, Regent of the Sea: Cannanore's Response to Portuguese Expansion, 1507–1528, Delhi, 1988.
- Rajan Gurukkal & Raghava Varier, Eds., Cultural History of Kerala, Vol. I, Thiruvananthapuram, 1999.
- K. V. Krishna Iyer, Zamorins of Calicut: From the Earliest Times to A D 1806. Calicut: Norman Printing Bureau, 1938.
- M. G. S. Narayanan, Calicut: The City of Truth Revisited Kerala. University of Calicut, 2006
- M. G. S. Narayanan, Perumals of Kerala: Brahmin Oligarchy and Ritual Monarchy – Political and Social Conditions of Kerala Under the Cera Perumals of Makotai (c. AD 800–AD 1124). Kerala. Calicut University Press, 1996, pp 512.
- Schwartz, Stuart. Implicit Understandings, Cambridge University Press, Cambridge, 665 pp, 1994, 302. ISBN 0-521-45880-3
- Hamilton, Alex. A New Account of the East Indies, Pinkerton's Voyages and Travels, viii. 374
- Hart, Henry H. The Sea Road to the Indies. New York:MacMillan Company, 1950.
- Danvers, Frederick Charles. The Portuguese in India. New York:Octagon Books, 1966.
