= Administration of Thrissur district =

Thrissur District has four types of administrative hierarchies:

- District, Taluk, and Village administration managed by the state government of Kerala; non-elected posts.
- Panchayath Administrations, which are managed by the elected local bodies (Tier-3)
- Assembly Constituencies for the State Government of Kerala (Tier-2)
- Parliament Constituencies for the Union Government of India (Tier-1)

== Revenue and Civil ==
Taluks in Thrissur District

Shri. Arjun Pandian IAS

District Collector & Magistrate of Thrissur
- Incumbent
- Assumed office 19 July 2024
- Deputy: Shri. Akhil V Menon IAS
- Sub-Collector & Revenue Divisional Officer (TCR)
- Deputy: Shri. Murali T
- Deputy Collector (General) & Additional District Magistrate
- Deputy: Dr. M C Rejil
- Revenue Divisional Officer (IJK)

=== Taluks ===
Taluks & its Headquarters

Thrissur	Thrissur
Mukundapuram	Irinjalakuda
Kodungallur	Kodungallur
Chavakad	Chavakad
Thalapilly	Wadakkanchery
Chalakudy	Chalakudy
Kunnamkulam	Kunnamkulam

The district is divided into two Revenue Sub Divisions: Thrissur and Irinjalakuda, and is headed by the Revenue Divisional Officer (RDO). The district is divided into seven taluks, headed by the Thasildar. Each of these taluks is further divided into villages headed by a village officer, with a total of 255 villages in the district. The numbers in the brackets denote the number of villages in each taluk.

- Taluks under Thrissur Revenue Division:
  - Thrissur (74)
  - Chavakkad (29)
  - Talappilly (45)
  - Kunnamkulam (29)
- Taluks under Irinjalakuda Revenue Division:
  - Mukundapuram (29)
  - Chalakudy (31)
  - Kodungallur (18)

=== Villages ===
The following contains a detailed list of villages within Thrissur district, under various taluks.

== Law and order ==
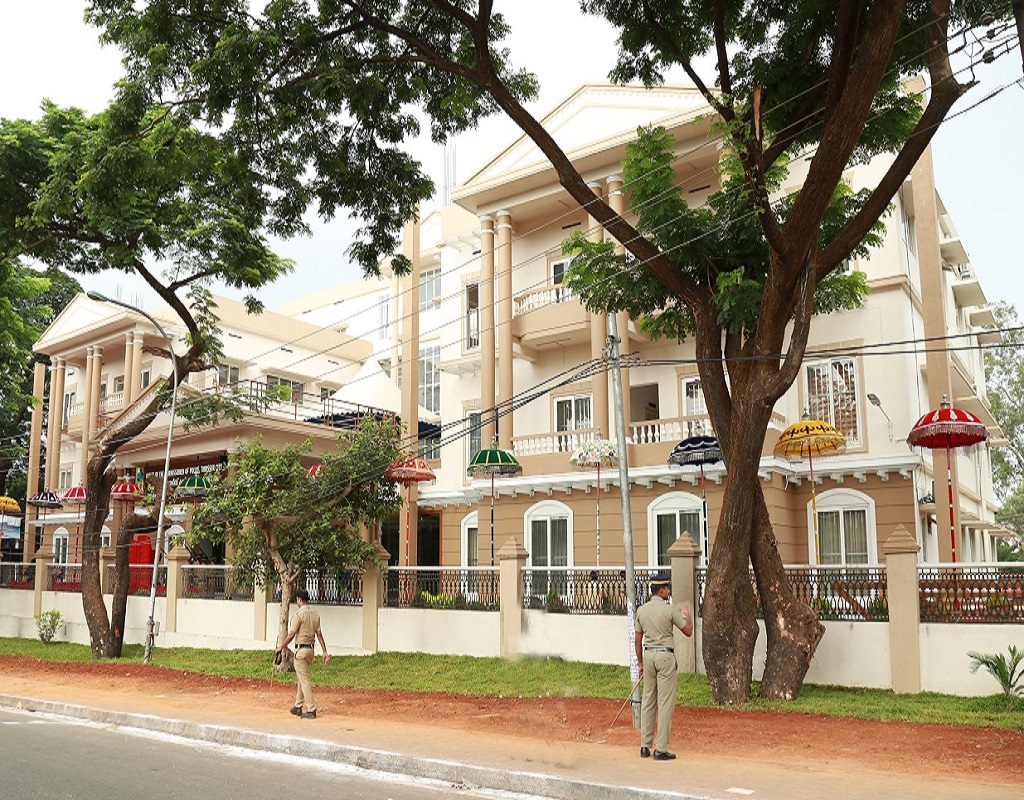
Office of the District Police Chief

Thrissur district is the headquarters of Thrissur City Police and Thrissur Rural Police, which make up the two police districts that operate within the civil district of Thrissur. The city is also the headquarters of Deputy Inspector General of Police (DIG), Thrissur Range, which looks after the law and order of Thrissur District, Palakkad District and Malappuram district. All the Superintendent of Police of these three districts come under his jurisdiction. The city also contains the Kerala Police Academy, Central Prison, Viyyur, Police Dog Training Centre and Excise Academy and Research Centre. India Reserve Battalion, new commando unit of Kerala Police is headquartered in Ramavarmapuram. Border Security Force (148 battalion) have its first centre in Kerala in Thrissur only.

=== Thrissur Commissionerate ===
Commissioner of Police Nakul Rajendra Deshmukh IPS District Police Chief
- Police career
- Department: Kerala Police
- Branch: Thrissur City Police
- Service years: 2025 - Incumbent
- Rank: Superintendent of Police (SP)

The Thrissur City Police is headed by a Police Commissioner, an Indian Police Service (IPS) officer of the rank Superintendent of Police (SP). The city is divided into four sub divisions, Thrissur, Ollur, Kunnamkulam and Guruvayur. It also operates 24 police stations, including a woman police station and a traffic police station. There is also a Cyber Crime police station. The Thrissur City Police Commissionerate is situated in Pattalam Road near East Police Station.

=== Thrissur Rural Police District ===
District Police Chief B Krishnakumar IPS
- Police career
- Department: Kerala Police
- Branch: Thrissur Rural Police
- Service years: 2025 - Incumbent
- Rank: Superintendent of Police (SP)

The Thrissur Rural Police has its headquarters at the Rural District Police Headquarters at Kattungachira, Irinjalakuda. It is headed by a Superintendent of Police (SP). Thrissur Rural Police District comprises 22 Police Stations in 3 Police Sub Divisions: Irinjalakuda, Chalakudy, and Kodungallur. Out of 22 Police Stations, 19 are handling law and order. The other 3 Police Stations are the Coastal Police Station at Azhekode, Vanitha Police Station at Irinjalakuda, and the Cyber Police Station at Irinjalakuda. Apart from this, one Control Room is functioning at Kodungallur.

== Elected Governing Bodies ==
=== Local Self-Governing Bodies (Tier-3) ===
The district of Kerala has the following counts of Local Self-Governing Bodies (LSGs), which form the third-tier government.

- Panchayati Raj Institutions (Rural)
  - District Panchayat - 1
  - Block Panchayat - 16
  - Grama Panchayat - 86
- Urban Local Bodies
  - Municipality - 7
  - Municipal Corporation - 1

Thrissur Municipal Corporation is the only municipal corporation in the district. Each local body is made up of multiple wards, each of which elects a councillor to the body.

=== Kerala State Assembly Constituencies (Tier-2) ===
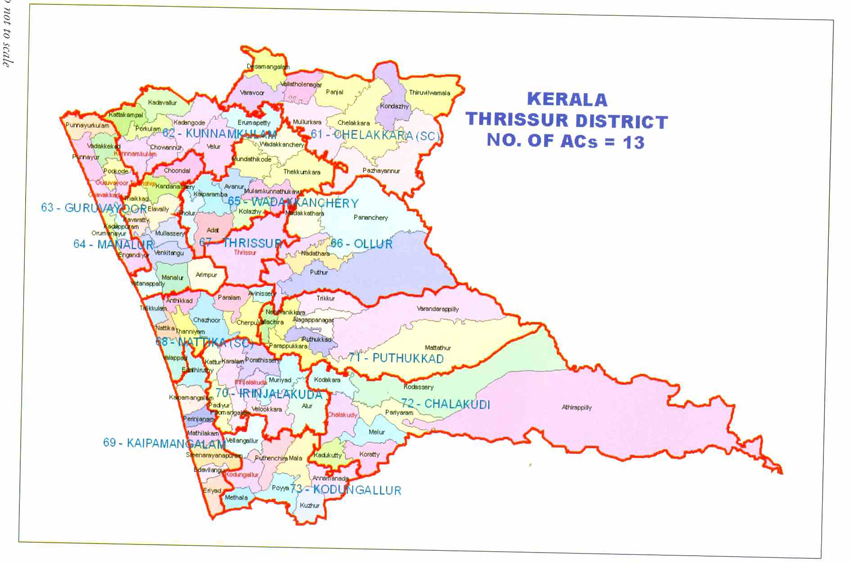

There are 13 constituencies from the district of Thrissur:

- 61 - Chelakkara Assembly Constituency
- 62 - Kunnamkulam Assembly Constituency
- 63 - Guruvayoor Assembly Constituency
- 64 - Manalur Assembly Constituency
- 65 - Wadakkanchery Assembly Constituency
- 66 - Ollur Assembly Constituency
- 67 - Thrissur Assembly Constituency
- 68 - Nattika Assembly Constituency
- 69 - Kaipamangalam Assembly Constituency
- 70 - Irinjalakuda Assembly Constituency
- 71 - Puthukkad Assembly Constituency
- 72 - Chalakudy Assembly Constituency
- 73 - Kodungallur Assembly Constituency

=== Lok Sabha Parliamentary Constituency (Tier 1) ===
The district of Thrissur forms part of three parliamentary constituencies, for the Lok Sabha, out of 20:

- Thrissur Lok Sabha constituency
- Chalakudy Lok Sabha constituency; headquartered in Chalakkudy, Thrissur district. (3/7 assembly constituencies in Thrissur district)
- Alathur Lok Sabha constituency; headquartered in Alathur, Palakkad district. (3/7 assembly constituencies in Thrissur district)

Suresh Gopi is the Thrissur MP, Benny Behanan is the Chalakudy MP, and K. Radhakrishnan is the Alathur MP.

== Local Self-Governments (Tier-3) ==
The number of local bodies governed by different coalitions/alliances is listed below, along with the total number. These are as per the last elections held in 2025 December.

2025 Thrissur Local Self-Government
LSG body	Ruling Coalition / Party					Total
LSG body	LDF	UDF	NDA	Others	Tie	Total
Grama Panchayats	44	34	1	0	7	86
Block Panchayats	10	5	0	0	1	16
District Panchayats	1	0	0	0	0	1
Municipalities	5	2	0	0	0	7
Corporations	0	1	0	0	0	1
Total	60	42	1	0	8	111

The following lists the number of wards held by each coalition/alliance across multiple local bodies, as of 2025.

2025 Thrissur LSG Wards
Local self-government body	Ruling Coalition / Party				Total
Local self-government body	LDF	UDF	NDA	Others	Total
Grama Panchayats	726	641	171	63	1601
Block Panchayats	133	88	5	5	231
District Panchayats	21	9	0	0	30
Municipalities	125	99	36	26	286
Corporations	11	33	8	4	56
Total	1016	870	220	98	2204

=== Thrissur Municipal Corporation ===
Honourable Dr. Niji Justin

10th Mayor of Thrissur
- In office December 26, 2025 – Incumbent
- Deputy: A Prasad
- Preceded by: M K Varghese

Personal details
- Party: Indian National Congress

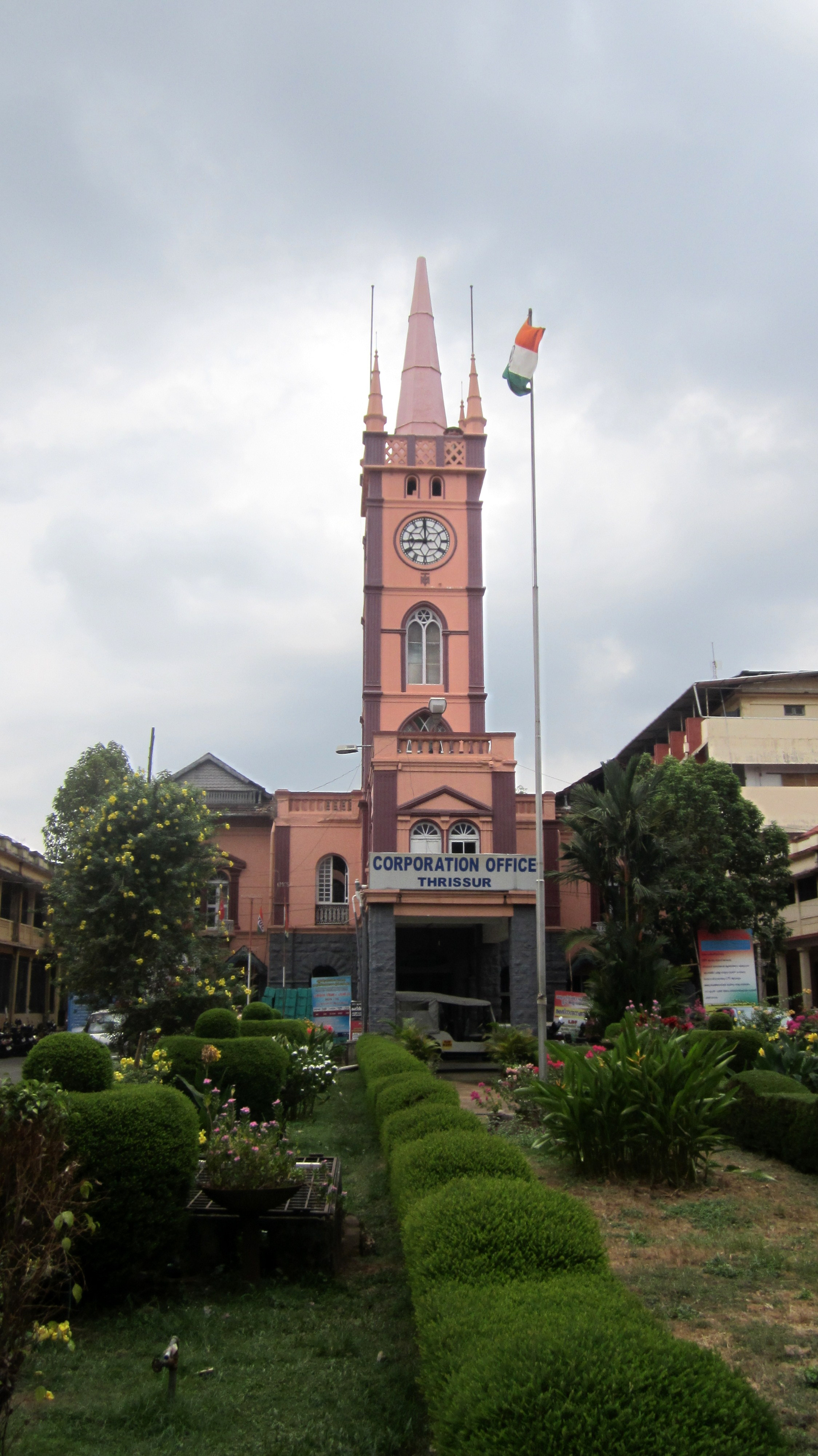
Municipal Corporation Building, Thrissur seen from M.O. Road

Thrissur city functioned as a municipality since 1921 under the Cochin Municipal Regulations. In 1932, the new corporation building was constructed, and in 1972 new areas from other Panchayats were added to the municipality. On 1 October 2000, the municipal town was upgraded to the level of a Municipal Corporation with the Panchayats of Ayyanthole, Koorkkenchery, Nadathara, Vilvattom (part), Ollur and Ollukkara. The Corporation comprises three legislative assemblies Thrissur, Ollur and Cherpu. The city is administered by the Thrissur Municipal Corporation, headed by a mayor. The corporation is the second-largest city corporation in the state of Kerala in India. The city is the only local body in Kerala which directly controls power, water supply and solid waste management system in the city.

For administrative purposes, the city is divided into 56 wards, from which the members of the corporation council are elected for five years. The corporation has its headquarters in Thrissur city. The Thrissur Urban Development Authority and Town and Country Planning Department (TCPD) are the agencies that prepare development plan for the city.

=== Municipalities ===
Thrissur district has 7 municipalities, as listed below, each governed by a Municipal chairman and several committees chaired by councellors (ward members).

Under updation in line with 2025 local body elections.

No	Municipality	District	Chairman	Alliance
M08032	Chalakudy	Thrissur		United Democratic Front (Kerala)
M08033	Irinjalakuda	Thrissur		United Democratic Front (Kerala)
M08034	Kodungalloor	Thrissur		Left Democratic Front
M08035	Chavakkad	Thrissur		Left Democratic Front
M08036	Kunnamkulam	Thrissur		Left Democratic Front
M08037	Guruvayur	Thrissur		Left Democratic Front
M08068	Wadakkancherry	Thrissur		Left Democratic Front

== Members of Elected Constituencies (Tier 1&2) ==
=== Thrissur Lok Sabha constituency ===
KL 10 - Thrissur
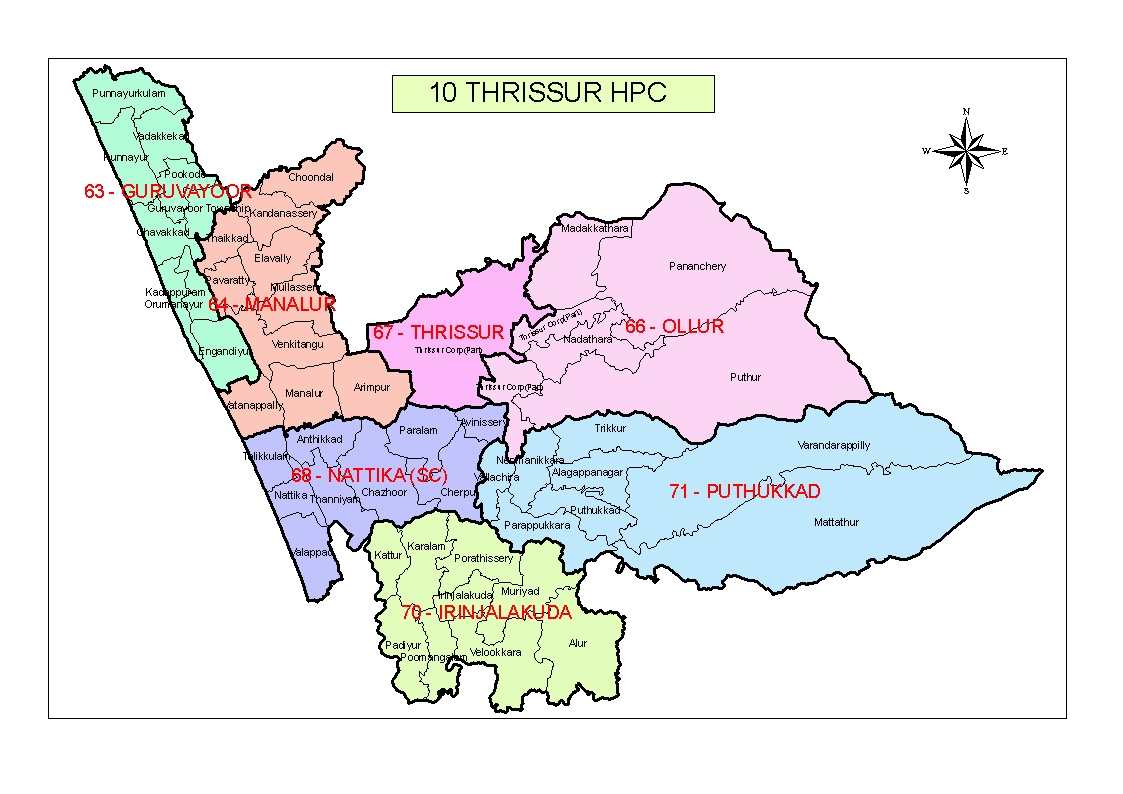
- Thrissur Lok Sabha constituency

Constituency details
- Country: India

Honourable Suresh Gopi MP
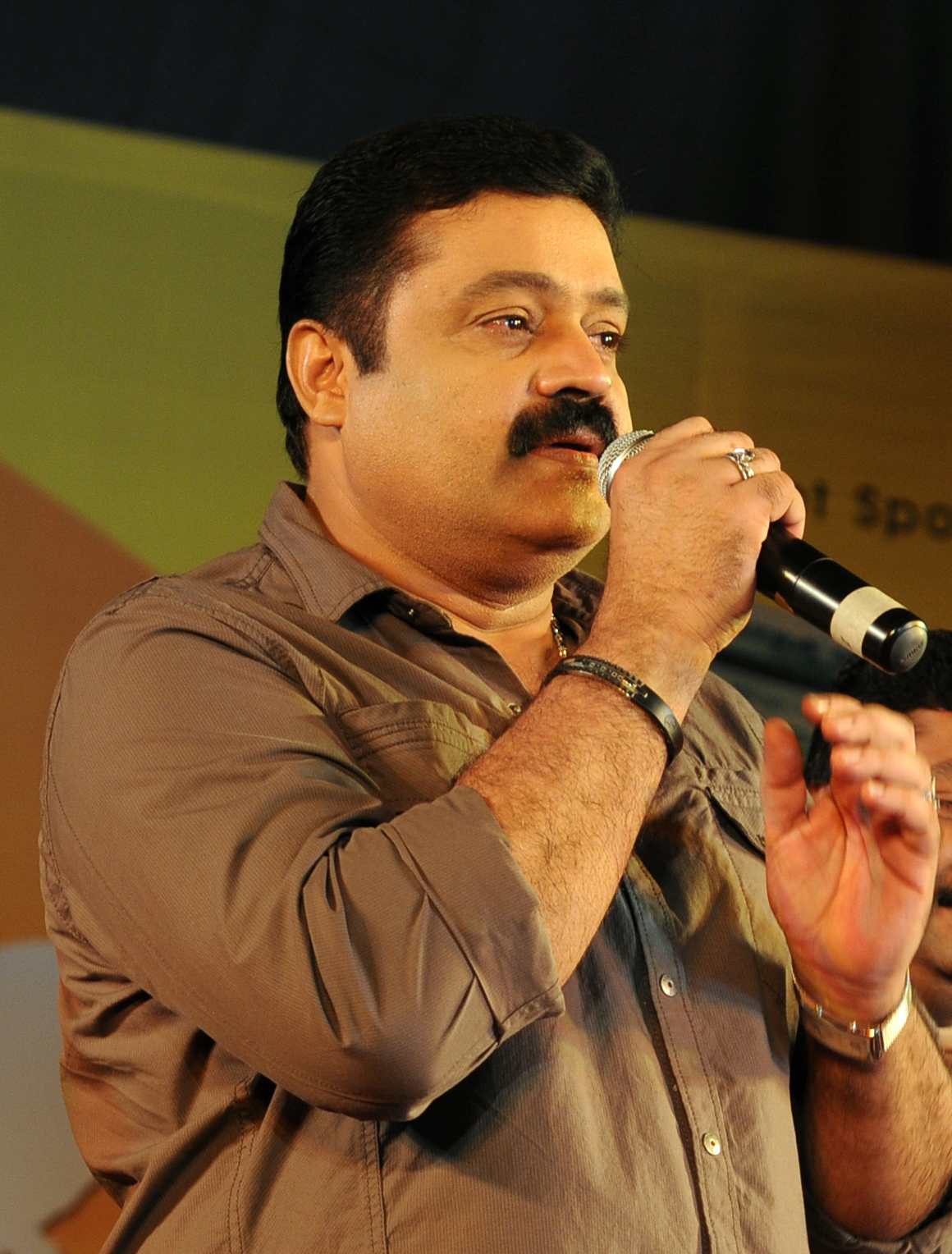

Member of the Indian Parliament for Thrissur Lok Sabha constituency
- Incumbent
- Assumed office 4 June 2024
- Preceded by: T. N. Prathapan

Personal details
- Party: BJP

2024 Indian general election: Thrissur
Party	Candidate	Votes	%	±%
BJP	Suresh Gopi	412,338	37.80	▲9.61
CPI	V. S. Sunil Kumar	337,652	30.95	▲0.10
INC	K. Muraleedharan	328,124	30.08	▼9.75
NOTA	None of the above	6,072	0.56	▲0.15
Majority		74,686	6.90	▼2.08
Turnout		1,092,574	73.63	▼4.32
BJP gain from INC		Swing		

==== Kerala State Legislative Assembly segments ====
Thrissur Lok Sabha constituency is composed of the following assembly segments :

No	Name	District	MLA	Party
63	Guruvayur	Thrissur	N. K. Akbar	Communist Party of India (Marxist)
64	Manalur	Thrissur	Murali Perunelly	Communist Party of India (Marxist)
66	Ollur	Thrissur	K. Rajan	Communist Party of India
67	Thrissur	Thrissur	P. Balachandran	Communist Party of India
68	Nattika (SC)	Thrissur	C. C. Mukundan	Communist Party of India
70	Irinjalakuda	Thrissur	R. Bindu	Communist Party of India (Marxist)
71	Puthukkad	Thrissur	K. K. Ramachandran	Communist Party of India (Marxist)

=== Chalakudy Lok Sabha constituency ===
KL 11 - Chalakudy
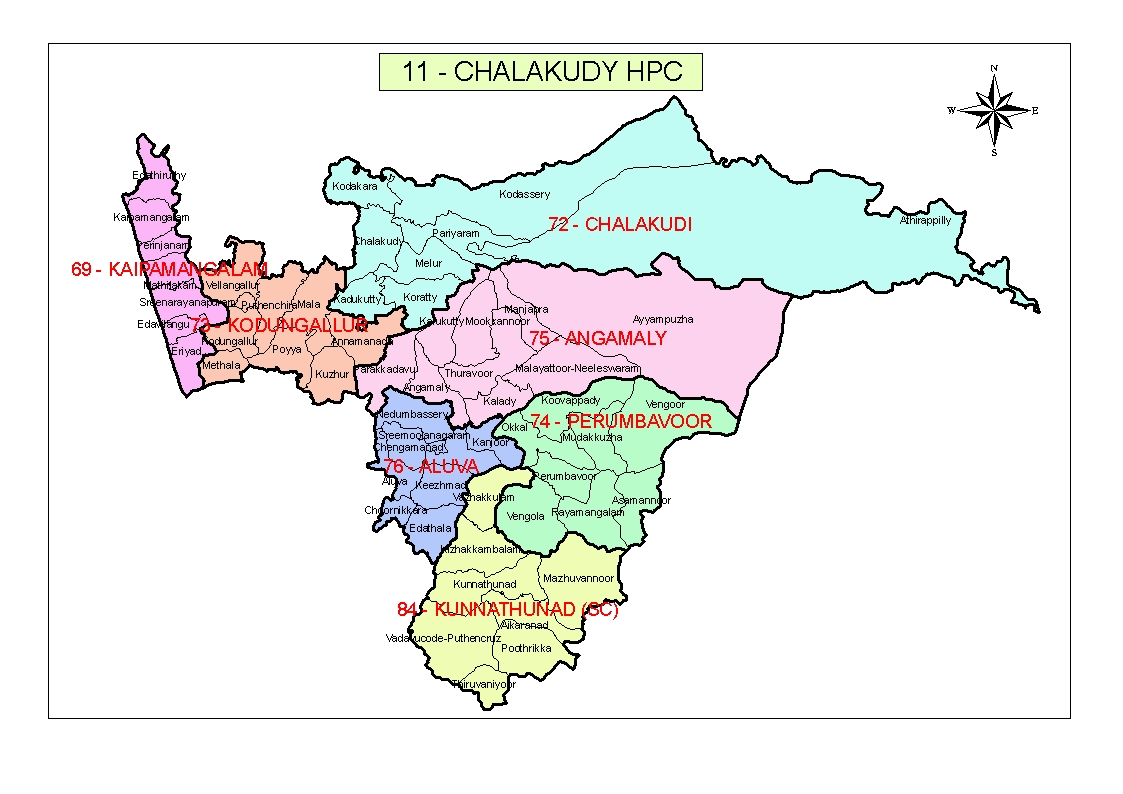
- Chalakudy Lok Sabha constituency

Constituency details
- Country: India

Honourable Benny Behanan MP
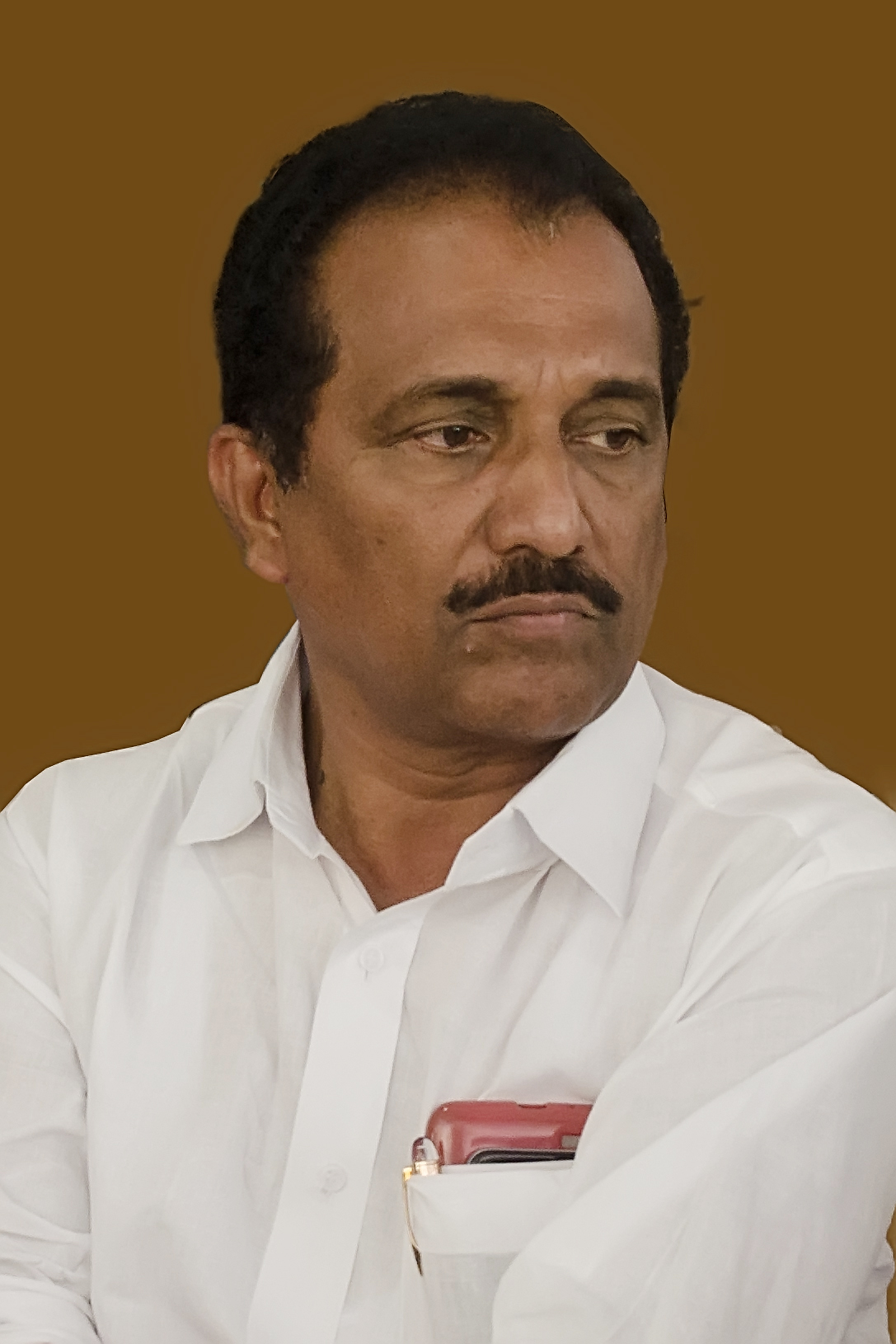

Member of the Indian Parliament for Chalakudy Lok Sabha constituency
- Incumbent
- Assumed office 23 May 2019 (2nd term)
- Preceded by: Innocent Vareed Thekkethala

Personal details
- Party: INC

This constituency is headquartered in Chalakudy in Thrissur district, and includes parts of the nearby Ernakulam district. This constituency was formed in the 2009 delimitation.

2024 Indian general election: Chalakudy
Party	Candidate	Votes	%	±%
INC	Benny Behanan	394,171	41.44	▼6.37
CPI(M)	C. Raveendranath	3,30,417	34.73	▲0.28
BDJS	K.M. Unnikrishnan	1,06,400	11.18	
Twenty20 Kizhakkambalam	Adv Charley Paul	1,05,642	11.11	
NOTA	None of the above	8,063	0.85	
BSP	Rosilin Chacko	2,410	0.25	
Majority				
Turnout		9,53,520	72.72	
INC hold		Swing		

==== Kerala State Legislative Assembly segments ====
Chalakudy Lok Sabha constituency Lok Sabha constituency is composed of 7 assembly segments, namely Chalakudy, Kodungallur, Kaipamangalam, Angamaly, Perumbavoor, Aluva, and Kunnathunadu. The latter four are part of the Ernakulam district. The table only shows the assembly sections of Thrissur district.

No	Name	District	Member	Party
69	Kaipamangalam	Thrissur	E. T. Tyson	CPI
72	Chalakudy	Thrissur	T. J. Saneesh Kumar Joseph	INC
73	Kodungallur	Thrissur	V. R. Sunil Kumar	CPI(M)

Kaipamangalam assembly segment came into existence in 2008, following delimitation of legislative assembly constituencies. Chalakudy, Kodungallur, Perumbavoor, and Angamaly were part of the erstwhile Mukundapuram Lok Sabha constituency.

=== Alathur Lok Sabha constituency ===
KL 09 - Alathur
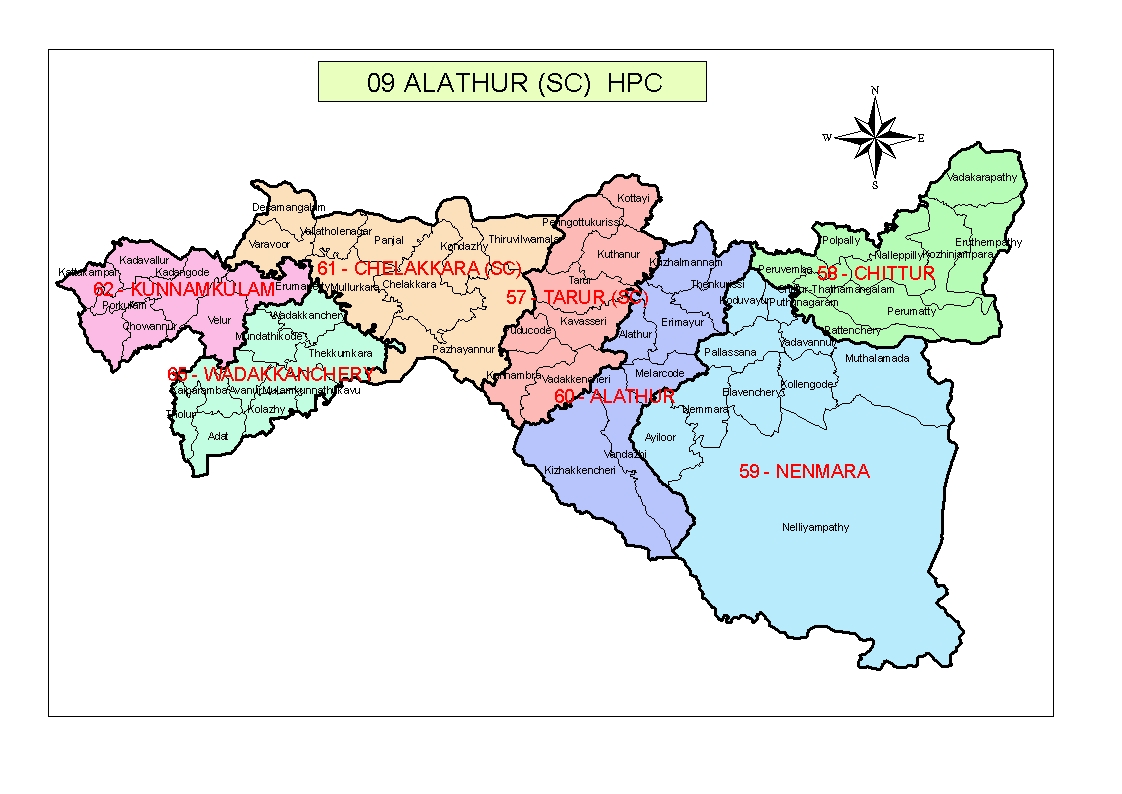
- Alathur Lok Sabha constituency

Constituency details
- Country: India
- Reservation: SC

Honourable K. Radhakrishnan MP
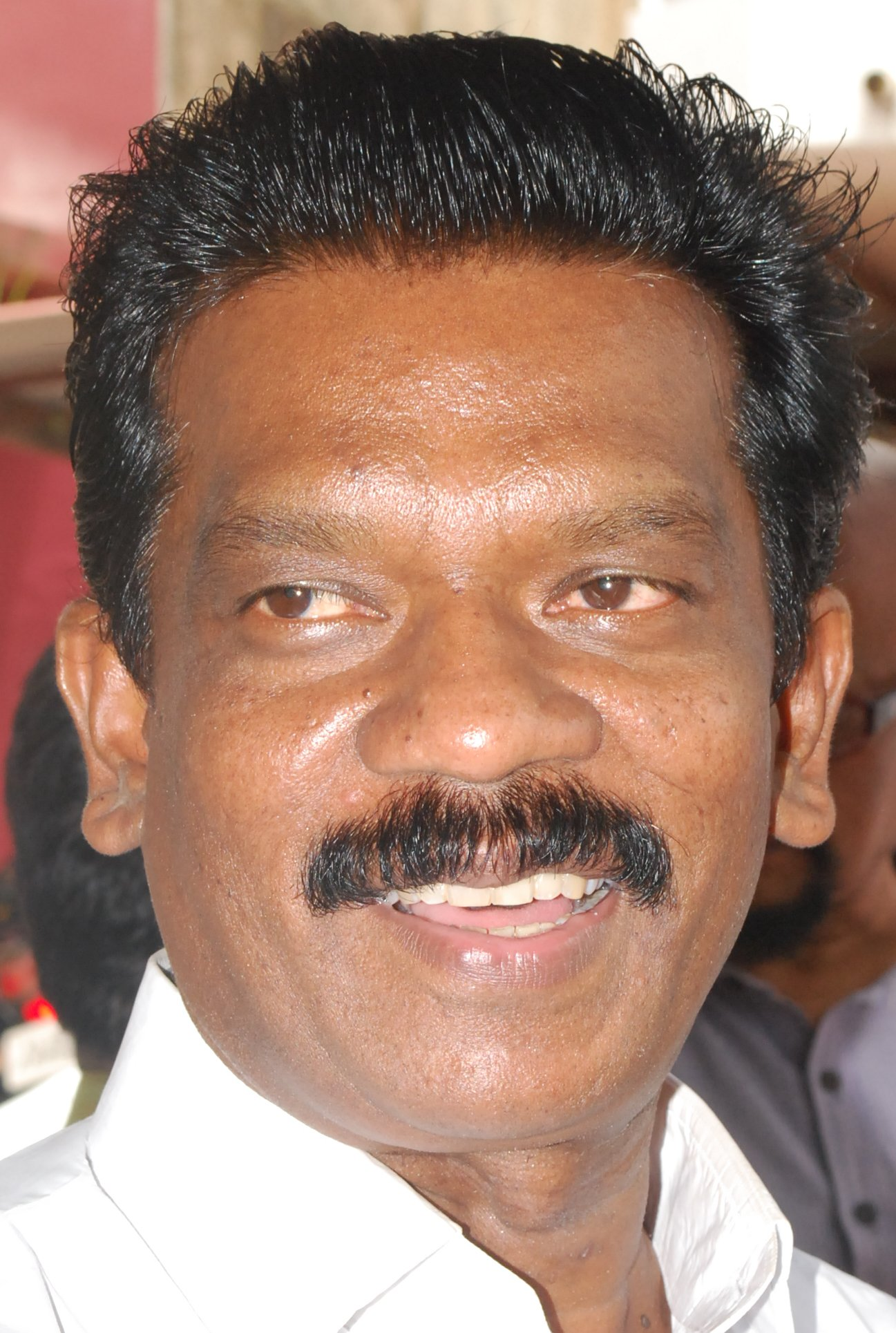

Member of the Indian Parliament for Alathur Lok Sabha constituency
- Incumbent
- Assumed office 4 June 2024
- Preceded by: Ramya Haridas

Personal details
- Party: CPI(M)

The Alathur Lok Sabha constituency is headquartered in the district of Palakkad, and is reserved for members of the Scheduled Castes. This constituency is spread across the two districts and was formed in the 2009 delimitation.

2024 Indian general election: Alathur
Party	Candidate	Votes	%	±%
CPI(M)	K. Radhakrishnan	403,447	40.66	▲3.86
INC	Ramya Haridas	3,83,336	38.63	▼13.77
BJP	T. N. Sarassu	1,88,230	18.97	▲10.97
NOTA	None of the above	12,033	1.21	▲0.45
Majority		20,111	2.03	▼13.56
Turnout		9,93,759	74.15	▼6.32
CPI(M) gain from INC		Swing		

==== Kerala State Legislative Assembly segments ====
Alathur Lok Sabha constituency Lok Sabha constituency is composed of 7 assembly segments, namely Alathur, Tarur (SC), Chittur, Nenmara, Wadakkanchery, Kunnamkulam, and Chelakkara (SC). The first four are part of the Palakkad district. The table only shows the assembly sections of Thrissur district.

Constituency number	Name	District	Member	Party
61	Chelakkara (SC)	Thrissur	U. R. Pradeep	CPI(M)
62	Kunnamkulam	Thrissur	A. C. Moideen	CPI(M)
65	Wadakkanchery	Thrissur	Xavier Chittilappilly	CPI(M)

Chelakkara, Wadakkancherry and Kunnamkulam segments were earlier in the erstwhile Ottapalam Lok Sabha constituency.
