= V. K. Rajan =

Indian politician

Minister for Agriculture
- In office 20 May 1996 – 29 May 1997
- Preceded by: P. P. Thankachan
- Succeeded by: Krishnan Kaniyamparambil

Member of the Legislative Assembly
- In office 1996 – 1997
- Preceded by: K. Karunakaran
- Succeeded by: U. S. Sasi
- Constituency: Mala
- In office 1977 – 1991
- Preceded by: E. Gopalakrishna Menon
- Succeeded by: Meenakshi Thampan
- Constituency: Kodungallur

Personal details
- Born: September 1940
- Died: 29 May 1997 (aged 56)
- Party: Communist Party of India
- Spouse: K. K. Sathy
- Children: 2 Sons, 1 Daughter (include V. R. Sunil Kumar)
- Parent: V. P. Kumaran (father)

V. Kumaran Rajan (September 1940 – 29 May 1997) was an Indian politician who was the Minister for Agriculture from 20 May 1996 to 29 May 1997 in the Kerala state of India.

He entered the political arena while being a student, associating with the Communist Party of India in 1956. Later, actively participating in the Trade Union Movements, he had been imprisoned several times for participating in workers’ agitations. In 1977, Shri. Rajan became elected as a member of KLA from Kodungallur constituency as a CPI candidate, and he represented the same constituency in 1980, 1982 and in 1987.

Getting elected to the KLA yet again, in 1996 from Mala constituency, Shri. Rajan served as Minister for Agriculture from 20 May 1996 to 29 May 1997, in the Ministry headed by Shri. E.K. Nayanar. Shri. Rajan was also, at different times, Member, State Council of CPI and CPI State Executive, Secretary, Thrissur District Committee of CPI, and CPI Parliamentary Party.

He also served as President of a number of trade unions affiliated to AITUC, including District Private Motor Workers' Union and Autoriksha Drivers’ Union, Kodungaloor and Trichur.

Smt. K.K. Sathy was his wife and they have two sons and one daughter. His son V. R. Sunil Kumar is the current MLA of Kodungallur Constituency.

Shri. V.K. Rajan died on 29 May 1997 while serving as Minister.
