= W. S. Sasi =

Indian politician

U. S. Sasi

Member of the Kerala Legislative Assembly
- In office 1996–2001
- Preceded by: V. K. Rajan
- Succeeded by: T. U. Radhakrishnan
- Constituency: Mala

Personal details
- Political party: Communist Party of India

U. S. Sasi is an Indian politician and leader of Communist Party of India (CPI). He represented Mala constituency in 10th Kerala Legislative Assembly elected in 1996 By-election.
