= Geetha Gopi =

Indian politician (born 1973)

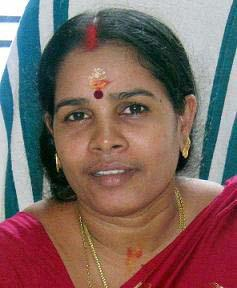
- Member of the Legislative Assembly

Member of Legislative assembly
- In office 2011–2021
- Preceded by: T. N. Prathapan
- Succeeded by: C. C. Mukundan
- Constituency: Nattika
- In office 2026–Incumbent
- Preceded by: C. C. Mukundan
- Constituency: Nattika

Personal details
- Born: 30 May 1973 (age 53) Punnayurkulam
- Party: Communist Party of India
- Spouse: K. Gopi
- Children: 2

Geetha Gopi (born 30 May 1973) is an Indian politician from Kerala. She is a three time member of the Kerala Legislative Assembly from Nattika Assembly constituency in Thrissur district representing the Communist Party of India.

Geetha Gopi was born on 30 May 1973 in Punnayurkulam, Thrussur district, Kerala.

== Career ==
Geetha Gopi started her political career in 1995. She was the Chairperson of Guruvayur Municipality in 2004 and 2009 and deputy chairperson of the same in 2011.

She first became an MLA winning the 2011 Kerala Legislative Assembly election from Nattika Assembly constituency on CPI ticket and retained the seat in the 2016 Assembly election. After a gap, she won from the same constituency in the 2026 Kerala Legislative Assembly election, again on CPI ticket. She polled 58,979 votes and defeated here nearest rival, Sunil Lalur of the Indian National Congress, by a margin of 7093 votes.
