= Kerala Sahitya Akademi Award for Miscellaneous Works =

Discontinued Malayalam literary award

The Kerala Sahitya Akademi Award for Miscellaneous Works was an annual award by the Kerala Sahitya Akademi (Kerala Literary Academy) to Malayalam writers for writing miscellaneous works of literary merit. It was one of the categories of the Kerala Sahitya Akademi Award. The award was established in 1969 and was discontinued from 1991, since many new categories were added to the Kerala Sahitya Akademi Award in 1992.

== Awardees ==
Year	Book	Writer	Image
1969	Rashtrapithavu	K. P. Kesava Menon	
1970	Athmakatha	E. M. S. Namboodiripad	
1971	Kanneerum Kinavum	V. T. Bhattathiripad	
1972	Kaliyugam	Ponjikkara Rafi, Sabeena Rafi	
1973	Marakkatha Kathakal	S. K. Nair	
1974	Vela Manassilirikkatte	Veloor Krishnankutty	
1975	Jivitappata	Cherukad	
1976	Natyakalpadrumam	Mani Madhava Chakyar	
1977	Keralathinte Samskarika Charithram	P. K. Gopalakrishnan	
1978	Ente Balyakalasmaranakal	C. Achutha Menon	
1979	Kesariyude Katha	K. P. Sankara Menon	
1980	Sahasra Purnima	C. K. Revathi Amma	
1981	Verakkooru	M. P. Balagopal	
1982	Cinema: Mithyayum Sathyavum	Thottam Rajasekharan	
1983	Aravinda Darsanam	K. Velayudhan Nair	
1984	Velluvilikal, Prathikaranangal	N. V. Krishna Warrier	
1985	Tatvamasi	Sukumar Azhikode	
1986	Chettante Nizhalil	Leela Damodara Menon	
1987	Kelappan	M. P. Manmadhan	
1988	M. N.te Hasyakrithikal	M. N. Govindan Nair	
1989	Ariyappedatha E. M. S.	Appukuttan Vallikunnu	
1990	M. N. Roy: Satyanweshiyaya Viplavakari	N. Damodaran	
1991	Pathrapravarthanam Enna Yathra	V. K. Madhavan Kutty	
