= Masappady Mathupillai =

- Directed by: A. N. Thampi
- Written by: Veloor Krishnankutty
- Produced by: C. K. Sherif
- Starring: Jayabharathi; Sudheer; KPAC Lalitha; Adoor Bhasi; Jose Prakash
- Music by: G. Devarajan
- Production companies: T&S Combines
- Distributed by: T&S Combines
- Release date: 9 March 1973
- Country: India
- Language: Malayalam

Masappady Mathupillai is a 1973 Indian Malayalam film directed by A. N. Thampi and produced by C. K. Sherif. The film stars Jayabharathi, Sudheer, KPAC Lalitha, Adoor Bhasi, Bahadoor and Jose Prakash in the lead roles. The film has musical score by G. Devarajan.

== Cast ==
- Jayabharathi
- KPAC Lalitha
- Adoor Bhasi
- Jose Prakash
- Manavalan Joseph
- Muthukulam Raghavan Pillai
- Alummoodan
- Bahadoor
- Kaduvakulam Antony
- Kaval Surendran
- Khadeeja
- Kunchan
- Kuttyedathi Vilasini
- Meena
- Narayana Das
- Nellikode Bhaskaran
- Paravoor Bharathan
- S. P. Pillai
- Sudheer
- Vincent

== Soundtrack ==
The music was composed by G. Devarajan and the lyrics were written by Vayalar Ramavarma, Kilimanoor Ramakanthan and Yusufali Kechery.

No.	Song	Singers	Lyrics	Length (m:ss)
1	"Ayalathe Chinnamma"	C. O. Anto	Vayalar Ramavarma	
2	"Purushagandham Sthree"	K. J. Yesudas	Vayalar Ramavarma	
3	"Swarnamurukkiyozhichapole"	P. Leela, P. Madhuri	Kilimanoor Ramakanthan	
4	"Zindabaad Zindabaad"	P. B. Sreenivas	Yusufali Kechery	
