= Minnaminugu =

- Directed by: Ramu Kariat
- Screenplay by: K. S. K. Thalikulam (dialogues)
- Story by: Ramu Kariat; Ponjikkara Rafi
- Produced by: Ramu Kariat; Sreenivasan
- Starring: Premji; Manavalan Joseph
- Cinematography: B. J. Reddy
- Edited by: K. V. Padmanabhan
- Music by: M. S. Baburaj
- Production company: Chithra Keralam
- Release date: 24 May 1957
- Country: India
- Language: Malayalam

Minnaminugu (transl. Firefly) is a 1957 Indian Malayalam-language film, directed by Ramu Kariat. The film stars Premji and Manavalan Joseph. It was released on 24 May 1957.

== Plot ==
Sadanandan (Eddy) is a new doctor posted to the village. He has two children, Babu (Vipin) and Suma (Seetha). His mother (Padmam Menon) asks Sadanandan to hire a maid, and he hires Ammini, the orphan maid played by Damayanthi. She takes good care of his children, but gets seriously wounded, and Sadanandan’s prompt medical care cures her. In the process, they fall in love. Padmam Menon is unable to comprehend this fire, but Babu (Vipin) and Suma (Seetha) are unable to handle the separation from Ammini, which results in them falling seriously ill. Ammini finds out and goes to the doctor's house; her care and love help them recover. Sadanandan realizes the need for a woman in bringing up his children, and Ammini becomes part of the family.

== Cast ==
- Premji
- Manavalan Joseph
- Santha Devi
- Kochattil Balakrishna Menon
- Vasanthi (debut)
- S Devan

== Production ==
Minnaminugu is the first film independently directed by Ramu Kariat. Filming took place at Premiere Studios, Mysore.

== Soundtrack ==
The music was composed by M. S. Baburaj, in his film debut. It is also the film debut of playback singer Machad Vasanthi .
