= Sabeena Rafi =

Indian essayist and historian of Malayalam literature (1918–1990)

- Born: 6 October 1918; Gothuruth, present day Ernakulam district, Kerala, India
- Died: 22 June 1990 (aged 65)
- Occupations: Essayist, historian
- Notable work: Chavittu Nadakam - Oru Charithra Padanam; Marxism, Oru Thirinjunottam; Kaliyugam
- Spouse: Ponjikkara Rafi
- Parents: Joseph; Mariamma
- Awards: Kerala Sahitya Akademi Award for Miscellaneous Works

Sabeena Rafi (6 October 1918 – 22 June 1990) was an Indian essayist and historian of Malayalam literature. Her oeuvre consists of philosophical works, an autobiography and Chavittu Nadakam - Oru Charithra Padanam, the first historical compendium on Chavittu Nadakam, an operatic dance form. Her book, Kaliyugam, a philosophical work jointly written with her husband, Ponjikkara Rafi, fetched her the Kerala Sahitya Akademi Award for Miscellaneous Works in 1972.

== Biography ==
Sabeena was born on 6 October 1918 at Gothuruth, a small village in the periphery of present day Ernakulam district of the south Indian state of Kerala to Joseph and Mariamma. She earned two master's degrees, in History and Economics, and served our her career as a teacher. She married Ponjikkara Rafi in 1963, following a period of romance, but the couple did not have children. She died on 22 June 1990, at the age of 65; survived by Rafi, who died two years later, on 6 September 1992.

== Legacy and honours ==
Sabeen Rafi's oeuvre consists of five non-fiction works and Chritumas Sammanam, her autobiography. Chavittu Nadakam - Oru Charithra Padanam, her 1964 publication on the history of Chavittu Nadakam, an operatic dance form originated in Ernakulam, is considered to be the first comprehensive book on the subject. Marxism, Oru Thirinjunottam, a book co-written with her husband, is a detailed study of the Marxian theory and its spiritual aspects; the book also has a critique on Mother of Maxim Gorky. Kaliyugam, again a Ponjikkara Rafi co-written work, is a study of human behaviour from early ages, with a philosophical perspective. The book fetched her the Kerala Sahitya Akademi Award for Miscellaneous Works in 1972.

== Bibliography ==
- Sabeena Rafi (1964). Chavittu Nadakam - Oru Charithra Padanam (in Malayalam) (1 ed.). Kochi: Avanthi Publications.
- Sabeena Rafi (1968). Christumas sammanam (in Malayalam) (1 ed.).
- Ponjikkara Rafi; Sebeena Rafi (1982). Kaliyugam (in Malayalam) (1 ed.). D. C. B. Kottayam.
- Ponjikkara Rafi; Sabeena Rafi (1991). Marxism Oru Thirinjunottam, Emmavoosilekkula Yathrayum (in Malayalam) (0 ed.). Bamsuri Books.
- Sabeena Rafi; Ponjikkara Rafi (1992). Sukradasayude charitram. Kottayam: D.C. Books.

== See also ==
- List of Malayalam-language authors by category
- List of Malayalam-language authors
