= O. J. Janeesh =

Cabinet Minister in Government of Kerala

Adv. O. J. Janeesh
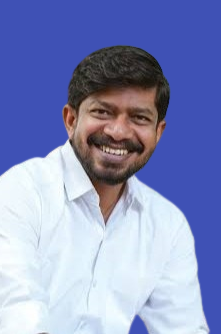

Minister for Sports and Youth Welfare, Registration, Archeology, Zoo and Museum Government of Kerala
- Incumbent
- Assumed office 18 May 2026
- Governor: Rajendra Arlekar
- Chief minister: V.D. Satheesan
- Departments: See list: Sports; Youth Affairs; Zoos; Museum; Registration; Archaeology; Archives
- Preceded by: Saji Cherian (Youth Welfare); V. Abdurahiman (Sports); Ramachandran Kadannappalli (Registration, Museum, Archeology); J. Chinchu Rani (Zoos)

Member of the Kerala Legislative Assembly
- Incumbent
- Assumed office 21 May 2026
- Preceded by: V. R. Sunil Kumar
- Constituency: Kodungallur

Personal details
- Born: O. J. Janeesh; 1989 (age 36–37) Mala, Thrissur, Kerala, India
- Party: Indian National Congress
- Parent: Janaranjanan (father)
- Education: Bachelor of Business Administration; Bachelor of Laws (Honours)
- Alma mater: Government Law College, Thrissur
- Occupation: Politician; Lawyer

Adv. O. Janaranjanan Janeesh (born 1989) is an Indian politician and lawyer currently serving as the Minister for Sports, Youth Welfare, Registration, and Archeology in the Government of Kerala. He is a member of the Kerala Legislative Assembly representing the Kodungallur constituency. A member of the Indian National Congress, he was elected in the 2026 Kerala Legislative Assembly election, unseating the incumbent representative from the Communist Party of India.

== Early life and education ==
O. J. Janeesh was born to Janaranjanan in the Thrissur district of Kerala. He completed his high school education from Government High School, Kuzhur and higher secondary education from VCSHSS Puthenvelikkara and joined Government Polytechnic College, Perumbavoor and later pursued a career in law. He graduated with BBA; LL.B Hons double degree from the Government Law College, Thrissur, affiliated with the University of Calicut, in 2019. Before his entry into the state legislature, he practiced as an advocate.

== Political career ==
Janeesh rose to prominence through his involvement with the student and youth wing of the Congress party. In the 2026 Kerala Assembly elections, he was selected as the candidate for the Kodungallur seat, which had been held by the LDF since 2016.

In a result characterized as a significant shift in the region's political landscape, he polled 65,162 votes, defeating the incumbent V. R. Sunil Kumar of the Communist Party of India (CPI) by a margin of 8,308 votes. Following the results, political analysts noted the decrease in the LDF vote share in what was previously considered a stable constituency.

== Election results ==
=== 2026 Kerala Legislative Assembly election ===
2026 Kerala Legislative Assembly election: Kodungallur
Party	Candidate	Votes	%	±%
INC	O. J. Janeesh	65,162		
CPI	V. R. Sunil Kumar	56,854		
BJP	Dr. Varghese George	23,933		
AAP	Dr. K. M. Francis Roy	447		
BSP	Ravi A. K.	488		
Independent	Nandgopan Vellathadi	284		
NOTA	None of the above	744		
Margin of victory		8308	5.66%	
INC gain from CPI				
Turnout		147912		
