= Ambili Ammavan (film) =

1986 film directed by KG Vijayakumar

- Directed by: KG Vijayakumar
- Written by: Veloor Krishnankutty
- Screenplay by: Veloor Krishnankutty
- Produced by: vijay varghese, Joice Thoppil
- Starring: Jagathy Sreekumar; Nedumudi Venu; Kalaranjini; Santhakumari
- Cinematography: VC Sasi
- Edited by: L Bhoominathan
- Music by: Kannur Rajan
- Production company: Yuvaraja Productions
- Distributed by: Yuvaraja Productions
- Release date: 28 November 1986
- Country: India
- Language: Malayalam

Ambili Ammavan is a 1986 Indian Malayalam film, directed by KG Vijayakumar. The film stars Jagathy Sreekumar, Nedumudi Venu, Kalaranjini and Santhakumari in lead roles. The film had musical score by Kannur Rajan.

== Cast ==
- Jagathy Sreekumar
- Nedumudi Venu
- Kalaranjini
- Santhakumari
- Jagannatha Varma
- Guinness Pakru
- Alummoodan
- Achankunju
