= T. N. Prathapan =

Indian politician

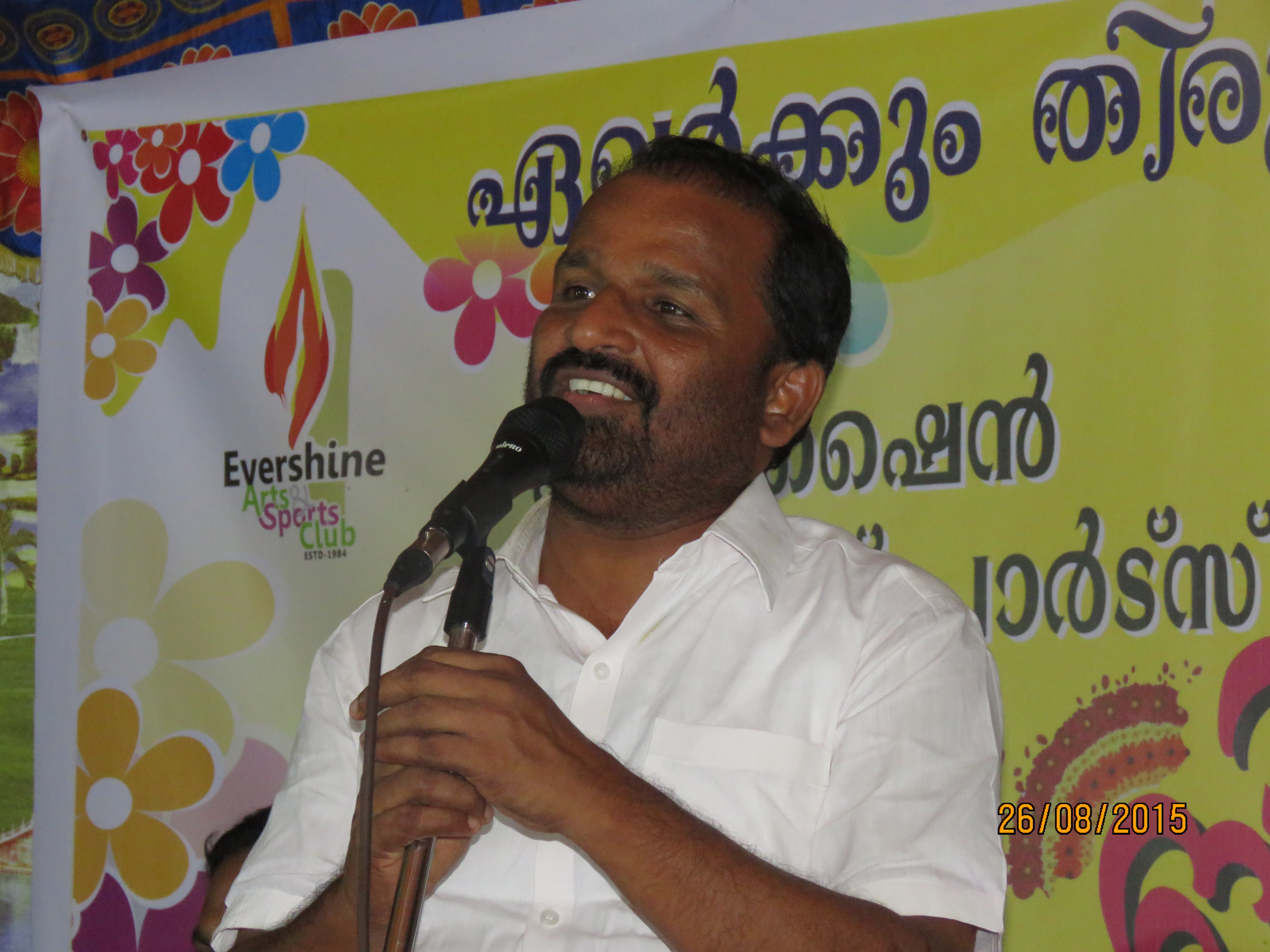

Member of Parliament Lok Sabha
- In office 2019–2024
- Preceded by: C. N. Jayadevan
- Succeeded by: Suresh Gopi
- Constituency: Thrissur

Member of Kerala Legislative Assembly
- In office 2011–2016
- Preceded by: K. P. Rajendran
- Succeeded by: V. R. Sunil Kumar
- Constituency: Kodungallur
- In office 2001–2011
- Preceded by: Krishnan Kaniyamparambil
- Succeeded by: Geetha Gopi
- Constituency: Nattika

Personal details
- Party: Indian National Congress

T. N. Prathapan is an Indian National Congress politician from Thrissur who was Member of parliament, Lok Sabha from Thrissur from 2019 to 2024.

He was a Member of the Kerala Legislative Assembly of Kodungallur from 2011 to 2016. He was previously elected to K.L.A. in 2001 and 2006 from Nattika Assembly Constituency.

He contested the 2019 Indian general election from Kerala as a candidate of Indian National Congress in Thrissur constituency and was elected as the MP.

T. N. Prathapan was appointed the working president of the Kerala Pradesh Congress Committee (KPCC) on 13 March 2024 by All India Congress Committee (AICC).He was appointed AICC Secretary on November 11, 2025 and still holds that position.
