= Thottam Rajasekharan =

Indian writer (1930–2026)

- Born: 24 September 1930; Trivandrum, Travancore, India
- Died: 1 August 2026 (aged 95)
- Occupation: Writer
- Writing career
- Years active: 1954–2026
- Notable awards: Kerala Sahitya Akademi Award for Miscellaneous Works; 1982 Cinema: Mithyayum Sathyavum

Thottam Rajasekharan (24 September 1930 – 1 August 2026) was an Indian writer. He died on 1 August 2026, at the age of 95.

== Major works ==
- Mukhammoodikal -1954 (Drama)
- Thrishna – 1967 (Novel)
- Nandu – 1972
- Cinema Midhayayum Sathyavum – 1981
- Udyogaparvam – 1991 (Service Story)
- Bodhi – 1991 (novel)
- Somatheeram – 2008 (Novel)
- Sivagiri Samaram oru Seshapatram – 2007
- Cinema Kalayum Jevithavum – 2010
- Utharakandom – 2011 (Service Story)
- Narayana Guru Nayakan

== See also ==
- Kerala Sahitya Akademi Award for Miscellaneous Works
