= Ponjikkara Rafi =

Indian writer (1924–1992)

- Born: Joseph Raphael; 12 April 1924; Ponjikkara, Cochin State present day Ernakulam district, Kerala, India
- Died: 6 September 1992 (aged 68)
- Occupations: Essayist, playwright, novelist, short story writer, screenwriter
- Notable work: Swargadhoothan; Ora Pro Nobis; Kaliyugam
- Spouse: Sabeena Rafi
- Parents: Shouryar Joseph; Anna
- Awards: Kerala Sahitya Akademi Award for Miscellaneous Works

Joseph Raphael (12 April 1924 – 6 September 1992), better identified as Ponjikkara Rafi, was an Indian essayist, playwright, short story writer and a novelist of Malayalam literature. His oeuvre consists of short story anthologies, novels, philosophical works and screenplays but he is best remembered for two novels, Daivadhoothan, regarded as the first Malayalam novel written in stream of consciousness narrative style, and Ora Pro Nobis, a historical novel based on the Dutch colonial rule. He was also the author of Kaliyugam, a philosophical work jointly written with his wife, Sabeena Rafi, which fetched him the Kerala Sahitya Akademi Award for Miscellaneous Works in 1972.

== Biography ==
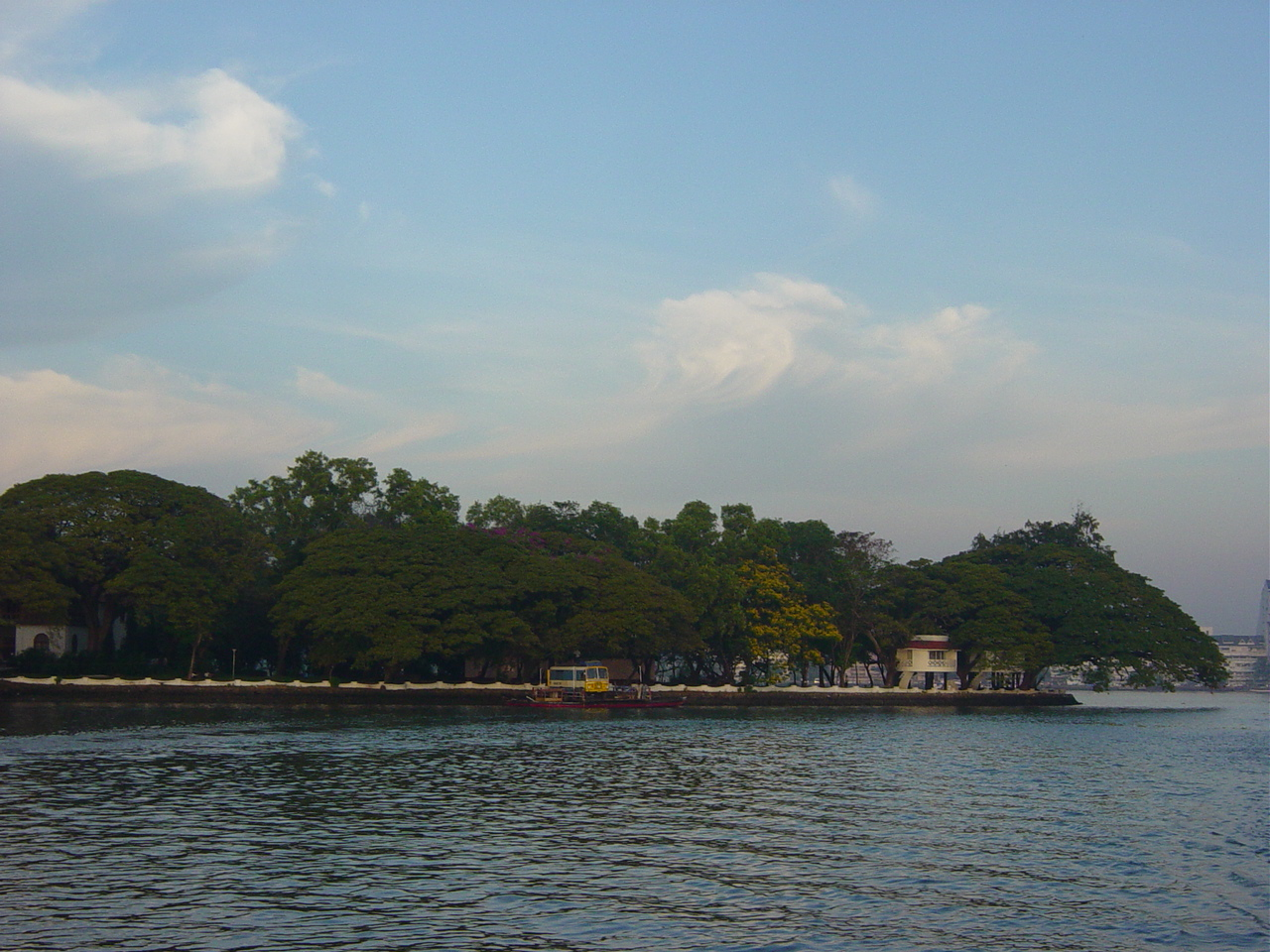
Ponjikkara, Rafi's birthplace

Ponjikkara Rafi was born Joseph Raphael on 12 April 1924 in Naduvathezhathu family of Ponjikkara, an islet in Mulavukad panchayat, along the coast of (then Cochin State) present day Ernakulam district, in the south Indian state of Kerala, in a family of carpenters as the seventh among the nine children born to Shouryar Joseph (Note: Shouryar is the vernacular for Xavier) and Anna. After early schooling at Ponnarimangalam School, he shifted to St. Albert's High School in the mainland but could not complete his high school studies. Subsequently, he passed a vocational course in blacksmithy from Government Trade School and started his career as a fitter at the work shop of the Cochin Port. His stay at the port was short as he was terminated from service in the wake of his participation in a workers' strike and his next job at the Indian Aluminium Company, Aluva, as a crane operator, also ended the same way. Later, he shifted his focus to journalism and literature and was associated with magazines such as Suprabha, Udayam and Democrat; it was at Democrat, he had the opportunity to work alongside C. J. Thomas, the noted playwright. He also worked with Vaikom Muhammed Basheer as a partner, when the renowned author ran Circle Book Stall, a book shop in Ernakulam. In 1966, he joined the Sahithya Pravarthaka Co-operative Society, a writers' co-operative, where he worked until 1974, in different capacities as those of a production assistant, reader and as the manager of National Book Stall, the retail wing of the society.

Rafi married Sabeena, who was five years elder to him, in 1963, following a period of romance, but the couple did not have children. He died on 6 September 1992, at the age of 68; his wife had predeceased him on 22 June 1990.

== Legacy and honours ==
Rafi published eleven short story anthologies, eight novels, two plays and three essay compilations. His literary journey started with his first published story, Antonyude Vagdhanam (Antony's Promise), which was published in Sathyanadam weekly and the first anthology, Bhavi, was published in 1945. His earlye novels portrayed the Cochin Portuguese creole culture and of the eight novels he wrote, Swargadhoothanand Ora Pro Nobisare the more notable ones. Swargadhoothan, a novel in three parts and published in 1958 is known to be the first Malayalam novel written in stream of consciousness narrative style and Ora Pro Nobis is a historical novel detailing the life of Dutch colonial Kochi. In Swargadhoothan, Rafi envisioned the islets around Kochi getting connected to the mainland in 1958 and it became a reality when Goshree bridges were opened in February 2004. He also wrote a detective novel, Padakkuthira Missi and two plays, Mathai Master and Mezhukuthiri. One of his non-fiction books, Marxism, Oru Thirinjunottam, co-written with his wife, is a detailed study of the Marxian theory and its spiritual aspects; the book also has a critique on Mother of Maxim Gorky. Kaliyugam, a Sabeena Rafi co-written work, is a study of human behaviour from early ages, with a philosophical perspective. The book fetched him the Kerala Sahitya Akademi Award for Miscellaneous Works in 1972.

Rafi entered the film world by writing the screenplay and dialogues for Koodappirappu, a J. D. Thottan, released in 1956. One of his stories, Minnaminungu, was adapted into a film under the same name by Ramu Kariat in 1957 and Rafi wrote the screenplay for the film. He was reported to have assisted Vayalar Rama Varma to gain entry into films. He held the position of the secretary of the Kerala Sasthra Sahithya Parishad from 1966 to 1974 and served as the vice president of the Parishad for a brief period. Pranatha Books, a Kerala-based publisher, has instituted an annual award, Ponjikkara Rafi Award, for recognizing excellence in Malayalam literature and the first recipient of the honour was Sebastian Pallithode.

== Bibliography ==
=== Novels ===
- Rafi, Ponjikkara (1958). Swarga dhoothan. Kottayam: Saahithya Pravathaka Co-operative Society.
- Rafi, Ponjikkara (1961). Kanayile kalyanam. S.P.C.S.
- Rafi Ponjikkara (1981). Ora Pro Nobis.
- Ponjikkara Rafi (1964). Aniyude Chechi (in Malayalam).
- Ponjikkara Rafi (1954). Fulltime Kamukan (in Malayalam) (0 ed.). Vidyarthi Mithram.
- Rafi, Ponjikkara (1985). Chenthaengintae pookkula (in Malayalam).

=== Short story anthologies ===
- Ponjikkara Rafi (1964). Karutha Blouse (in Malayalam).
- Ponjikkara Rafi (1963). Kochu Rosi (in Malayalam) (1 ed.).
- Ponjikkara Rafi (1963). Khadhar Jubba (in Malayalam) (1 ed.).
- Ponjikkara Rafi (1963). Alathallunna Puzha (in Malayalam) (1 ed.).
- Ponjikkara Rafi (1947). Thuranna Vathil (in Malayalam) (1 ed.).
- Ponjikkara Rafi (1951). Ozhivukalam (in Malayalam) (1 ed.).
- Rafi, Ponjikkara (1967). Theranjedutha kathakal (in Malayalam).

=== Non fiction ===
- Sebeena Rafi; Rafi, Ponjikkara (1992). Sukradasayude charitram. Kottayam: D.C. Books.
- Rafi, Ponjikkara (1982). Anuyathrakal, kandeththalukal. Kottayam: Sahitya Pravarthaka Sahakarana Sangam.
- Rafi, Ponjikkara (1985). Charithra maanangal. Kottayam, Current.
- Rafi, Ponjikkara (1989). Prakaasadhara. Trissur, Current.
- Ponjikkara Rafi; Sebeena Rafi (1991). Marxism Oru Thirinjunottam, Emmavoosilekkula Yathrayum (in Malayalam) (0 ed.). Bamsuri Books.
- Ponjikkara Rafi (1982). Kaliyugam (in Malayalam) (0 ed.). D. C. B. Kottayam.

=== Plays ===
- Ponjikkara Rafi (1963). Mathayi Master (in Malayalam) (0 ed.).
- Rafi Ponjikkara. Mezhukuthiri.

== Filmography ==
- Koodappirappu
- Minnaminugu

== See also ==
- List of Malayalam-language authors by category
- List of Malayalam-language authors
