= Sebastian Pallithode =

- Born: Sebastian; Alappuzha, Kerala, India
- Writing career
- Genres: Malayalam short story, Malayalam literature, Malayalam novels
- Notable awards: Ponjikkara Rafi literary award
- Website: sebastianpallithode.com

Sebastian Pallithode is an Indian writer, who has received many awards and recognitions for his work, writing in Malayalam. He has written more than 32 novels, including Nirangalude Rajakumaran, Agnus Dei, Judatheruvu, Jeevichirikkunavarude Manasil, Thorathe Peyyunna Mazhayil, Theophinachan: Oru Manushyasnehiyude Velipadukal, Pope John Paul II and Jeevithavum Kaalavum.

In April 2014, he received the first Ponjikkara Rafi literary award for his short stories in several Malayalam magazines and dailies.

== Bibliography ==
Sebastian Pallithode has authored over 32 novels and short stories among them the most notables are

- Clint - Nirangalude Rajakumaran
- Agnus Dei
- Judatheruvu
- Jeevichirikkunavarude Manasil
- Thorathe Peyyunna Mazhayil
- Theophinachan: Oru Manushyasnehiyude Velipadukal
- Pope John Paul II
- Jeevithavum Kaalavum
