= K. K. Valsaraj =

Indian politician

Member of the Kerala Legislative Assembly
- Incumbent
- Assumed office May 2026
- Preceded by: E. T. Taison
- Constituency: Kaipamangalam

Personal details
- Born: Valsaraj K. K. 1963 (age 62–63) Thrissur district, Kerala, India
- Party: Communist Party of India
- Parent: Kesavan (father)
- Education: BA Economics (University of Calicut)
- Occupation: Politician

K. Kesavan Valsaraj (born 1963) is an Indian politician serving as the member of the legislative assembly (MLA) for the Kaipamangalam constituency in the Kerala Legislative Assembly. A member of the Communist Party of India (CPI), he was elected in the 2026 Kerala Legislative Assembly election, retaining the seat for the party.

== Early life and education ==
K. K. Valsaraj was born to Kesavan in the Thrissur district of Kerala. He completed his secondary education and later pursued a degree in economics. He graduated with a Bachelor of Arts (BA) in Economics from Sree Krishna College, Guruvayur, under the University of Calicut in 1985. Before entering the state legislature, he was an active political worker in the Thrissur region.

== Political career ==
Valsaraj has been a long-standing member of the CPI and has held various organizational roles within the party's Thrissur district unit. In the 2026 Kerala Assembly elections, he was selected to contest from Kaipamangalam, succeeding the sitting legislator E. T. Taison.

In the final election results announced on 4 May 2026, Valsaraj secured 65,448 votes, defeating his nearest rival, T. M. Nazar of the Indian National Congress, by a margin of 9,944 votes. His victory ensured that the CPI maintained its strong presence in the coastal belt of Thrissur district.

== Election results ==
=== 2026 Kerala Legislative Assembly election ===
| Party | Candidate | Votes | % | ±% | |
|---|---|---|---|---|---|
| | CPI | K. K. Valsaraj | 65,448 | 46.41 | -7.29 |
| | INC | T. M. Nazar | 55,504 | 39.36 | +4.30 |
| | BDJS | Athulliaghosh Vettiyattil | 15,221 | 10.79 | +2.18 |
| | AAP | Jayan Eratt | 2,144 | 1.52 | - |
| Margin of victory | | 9,944 | 7.05 | | |
| Total valid votes | | 1,41,027 | | | |
| CPI hold | | Swing | -5.80 | | |
