= Kodungallur Assembly constituency =

Constituency of the Kerala legislative assembly in India

Kodungallur
- Constituency No. 73 for the Kerala Legislative Assembly
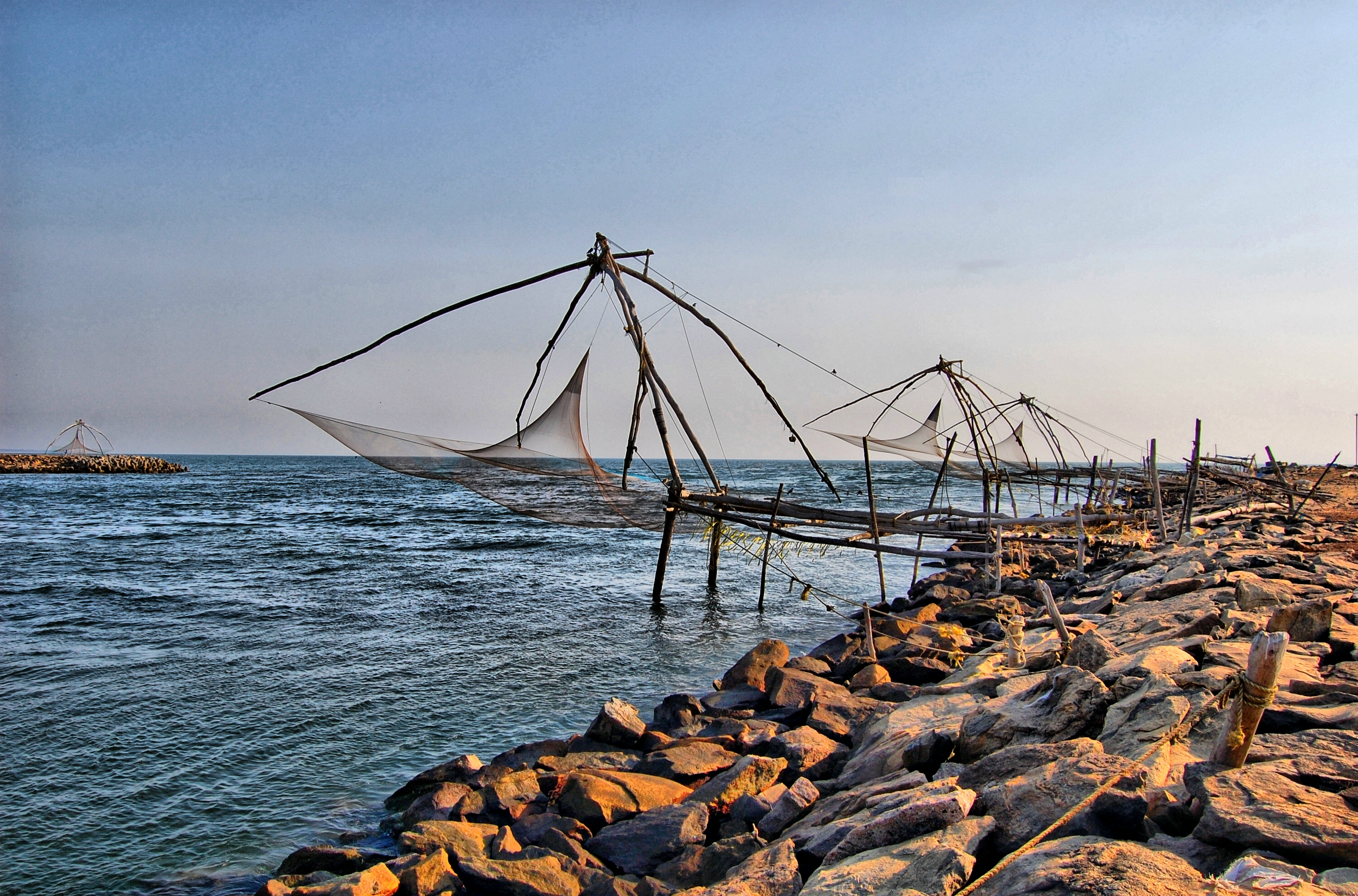
- Cape of Kodungallur, where the River Periyar empties into Arabian Sea.

Constituency details
- Country: India
- Region: South India
- State: Kerala
- District: Thrissur
- Established: 1957
- Total electors: 1,86,847 (2016)
- Reservation: None

Member of Legislative Assembly
- 16th Kerala Legislative Assembly
- Incumbent O. J. Janeesh
- Party: Indian National Congress
- Alliance: UDF
- Elected year: 2026

Kodungallur State assembly constituency is one of the 140 state legislative assembly constituencies in Kerala. It is also one of the seven state legislative assembly constituencies included in Chalakudy Lok Sabha constituency. As of the 2026 assembly elections, the current MLA is O. J. Janeesh of INC.

== Local self-governed segments ==
With The Redrawing Of Constituencies,Present Kodungallur Consists Of Major Parts Of Previous Mala Assembly Constituency,Which was represented by congress veteran K. Karunakaran.

Kodungallur Assembly constituency is composed of the following local self-governed segments:

Sl no.	Name	Status (Grama panchayat/Municipality)	Taluk
1	Kodungallur	Municipality	Kodungallur
2	Poyya	Grama panchayat	Kodungallur
3	Annamanada	Grama panchayat	Chalakudy
4	Kuzhur	Grama panchayat	Chalakudy
5	Mala	Grama panchayat	Chalakudy
6	Puthenchira	Grama panchayat	Mukundapuram
7	Vellangallur	Grama panchayat	Mukundapuram

== Members of Legislative Assembly ==
The following list contains all members of Kerala Legislative Assembly who have represented the constituency:

Election	Niyama Sabha	Name	Party	Tenure
1957	1st	E. Gopalakrishna Menon	Communist Party of India	1957 – 1960
1960	2nd	P. K. Abdul Khadir	Indian National Congress	1960 – 1965
1967	3rd	P. K. Gopalakrishnan	Communist Party of India	1967 – 1970
1970	4th	E. Gopalakrishna Menon	Communist Party of India	1970 – 1977
1977	5th	V. K. Rajan	Communist Party of India	1977 – 1980
1980	6th	V. K. Rajan	Communist Party of India	1980 – 1982
1982	7th	V. K. Rajan	Communist Party of India	1982 – 1987
1987	8th	V. K. Rajan	Communist Party of India	1987 – 1991
1991	9th	Meenakshi Thampan	Communist Party of India	1991 – 1996
1996	10th	Meenakshi Thampan	Communist Party of India	1996 – 2001
2001	11th	Umesh Challiyil	Janathipathiya Samrakshana Samithy	2001 – 2006
2006	12th	K. P. Rajendan	Communist Party of India	2006 – 2011
Major boundary changes
2011	13th	T. N. Prathapan	Indian National Congress	2011 – 2016
2016	14th	V. R. Sunil Kumar	Communist Party of India	2016 – 2021
2021	15th	V. R. Sunil Kumar	Communist Party of India	2021-2026
2026	14th	O. J. Janeesh	Indian National Congress	2026-incumbt

== Election results ==
=== 2025 ===
SEGMENTS	LDF	NDA	UDF	IND	T20		LEADING ALLIANCE
KODUNGALLUR	19058	18373	6984	450	0	44865	LDF
POYYA	5797	1788	5992	687	0	14264	UDF
ANNAMANADA	7859	1930	10058	92	746	20685	UDF
KUZHUR	3960	2386	5615	164	636	12761	UDF
MALA	7027	4673	8013	713	1098	21524	UDF
PUTHENCHIRA	6025	2431	4917	445	572	14390	LDF
VELLANGALUR	9678	4040	9279	686	0	23683	LDF
TOTAL	59404	35621	50858	3237	3052	152172	
%	39.03740504	23.40837999	33.42139158	2.12719817	2.005625214		

=== 2026 ===
2026 Kerala Legislative Assembly election: Kodungallur
Party	Candidate	Votes	%	±%
INC	O. J. Janeesh	65,162	44.05	
CPI	V. R. Sunil Kumar	56,854	38.44	
TTP	Dr. Varghese George	23,933	16.18	
AAP	Dr. K. M. Francis Roy	447	0.3	
BSP	Ravi A. K.	488	0.33	
Independent	Nandgopan Vellathadi	284	0.19	
NOTA	None of the above	744	0.5	
Margin of victory		8308	5.66%	
INC gain from CPI		Swing		
Turnout				

Local body	INC	CPI	NDA	Leading	Lead
Vellangallur	10,194	9,718	2,568	INC	476
Puthenchira	8,912	8,124	2,846	INC	788
Mala	2,924	2,477	1,349	INC	447
Kodungallur	19,623	21,028	11,566	CPI	1,405
Poyya	6,468	4,628	1,397	INC	1,840
Annamanada	10,171	6,371	2,256	INC	3,800
Kuzhur	5,644	3,408	1,637	INC	2,236
Total EVM	63,936	55,754	23,619	INC	8,182
Postal votes	1,226	1,100	314	INC	126
Total Votes	65,162	56,854	23,933	INC	8,308

=== 2021 ===
There were 1,92,933 registered voters in the constituency for the 2021 election.

2021 Kerala Legislative Assembly election: Kodungallur
Party	Candidate	Votes	%	±%
CPI	V. R. Sunil Kumar	71,457	47.99	▲2.28
INC	M. P. Jackson	47,564	30.37	▲1.57
BJP	Santhosh Cherakkulam	28,204	18.94	−
NOTA	None of the above	870	0.58	−
BSP	Ramya Mohanan	366	0.25	−
SUCI(C)	O. M. Sreeja	270	0.18	▲0.05
Independent	Rajan Painat	171	0.11	−
Margin of victory		23,893	16.05	
CPI hold		Swing		
Turnout		1,48,902	77.18	▼2.34

=== 2016 ===
There were 1,90,675 registered voters in the constituency for the 2016 election.

2016 Kerala Legislative Assembly election: Kodungallur
Party	Candidate	Votes	%	±%
CPI	V. R. Sunil Kumar	67,909	45.71	▲2.93
INC	K. P. Dhanapalan	45,118	30.37	▼19.74
BDJS	Sangeetha	32,793	22.07	−
NOTA	None of the above	886	0.60	−
SDPI	Manaf A. K.	558	0.38	−
Independent	Radhakrishnan C .K.	411	0.28	−
BSP	Subramanian	367	0.25	▼0.23
Independent	Rajan	210	0.14	−
SUCI(C)	C. S. Krishnakumar	200	0.13	▼0.13
Independent	Joshy Kumar K. V.	125	0.08	−
Margin of victory		22,791	15.04	
CPI gain from INC		Swing		
Turnout		1,48,577	79.52	▲3.38

=== 2011 ===
There were 1,76,055 registered voters in the constituency for the 2011 election.

2011 Kerala Legislative Assembly election: Kodungallur
Party	Candidate	Votes	%	±%
INC	T. N. Prathapan	64,495	50.11	
CPI	K. G. Shivaanandan	55,063	42.78	
BJP	I. R. Vijayan	6,732	5.23	
BSP	Ambily Unnikrishnan	624	0.48	−
Independent	Haridas K. B.	461	0.36	
Independent	Rajesh Appat	377	0.29	
Independent	Ally Ravi	343	0.27	
SUCI(C)	Suja Anthony	330	0.26	
Independent	T. U. Radhakrishnan	289	0.22	−
Margin of victory		9,432	7.33	
INC gain from CPI		Swing		
Turnout		1,28,714	76.14	
