= Veloor Krishnankutty =

Indian literary satirist

- Born: September 19, 1927; Veloor, Kottayam, Travancore
- Died: August 22, 2003 (aged 75); Kottayam, Kerala, India
- Occupations: Writer, screenwriter
- Children: Two daughters and a son
- Parents: N. N. Kunjunni; Parvathi Amma
- Awards: 1974 Kerala Sahitya Akademi Award for Miscellaneous Works

N. K. Krishnankutty, popularly known as Veloor Krishnankutty (19 September 1927 – 22 August 2003), was an Indian satirist of Malayalam literature. Kerala Sahitya Akademy awarded him their annual award for miscellaneous works in 1974.

== Biography ==
Veloor Krishnankutty was born on September 19, 1927 in Velur in the present day Kottayam district, then in Travancore to N. N. Kunjunni and Parvathi Amma.

His education was at M. D. Seminary, Kottayam and CMS College Kottayam. His career started as a journalist in Deepika where he used to write a column under the pen name Pathraparayanan, and became the editor of the Deepika weekly. Later, he sat in the editorial board of Keraladhwani for eight years. He was also a member of the senate of the University of Cochin and the advisory boards of the All India Radio and the Institute of Children's Literature.

In 1973, one of his books, Masappady Mathupillai was adapted into a film under the same name and he wrote the dialogues. Noted filmmaker, K. G. George based his 1984 satire Panchavadi Palam on a book of Krishnankutty of the same name and two years later, he wrote the story, screenplay and dialogues for Ambili Ammavan. His book, Vela Manasilirikkatte, fetched Krishnankutty the Kerala Sahitya Akademi Award for Miscellaneous Works in 1974. He was also a recipient of other honours including E. V. Krishna Pillai Memorial Janma Satabdi Award and K. Karunakaran Memorial Seva Sangham Award.

He died on August 22, 2003, at a private hospital in Kottayam where he had been admitted following renal complaints, survived his wife, two daughters and a son.

== Books ==
Sl. No	Book's Name	Publisher Details
1	Adapradhaman	Deepika Book Depot
2	Avalosunda	Resmi Printing and Publication, Ernakulam
3	Akila Kerala Vayasans Club	N.B.S
4	Arimpara Devasya	N.B.S
5	Athirthiyilekku	CISS Book House, Kottayam Printed SD Printing, Ernakulam.
6	Aalkoottathil Eliyamma	Current Books, Kottayam
7	Aattavilakku	Venus, Konni
8	Aadyathe Vishu	M.S Book Depot, Kollam
9	Avivahitharkku maathram	
10	Aareyum Premikkathirikku	
11	Angane thanne	Aarya Bharathi Publishers, Kottayam
12	Aasane Eruo	Mangalam Publications, College Road, Kottayam
13	Aanavaal	Sree Ramavilasam Press, Kollam
14	Edavazhiyil Kittuvasaan	N.B.S
15	Erupathettu Kettu	Narasinha Vilasam Press
16	Ettoliyovu	Current Books, Kottayam
17	Ennu Rokkam	
18	Eppam Lissy Ithile Varum	N.B.S
19	Ettooli Sandesam	Pusthakasaala, Alapuzha
20	Election Ettooppu	Prabhath Book House, Trivandrum
21	Undayilla Vedi	Royal Book Depot
22	Undittu Poyal Mathi	Deepika Book House
23	Undappakru	Venus Press, Konni
24	Enikku Nee Maatram	Prabhath Printing & Publishing Company Ltd.
25	April Fool	D C Books, Kottayam
26	Eliyamma Memorial	Janatha Publications, kanhangad.
27	Ozhukkathu SankaraDas	
28	Oru Daivam Sthalam Vittu	Current Books, Kottayam
29	Kadha Prasnga Smaranakal	Prabhath Printing & Publishing Company Ltd.
30	Kalyanam Kazhinjappol	
31	Kalyanikku Kambi Vannu	Current Books, Kottayam
32	Kathu kitty Nandi	
33	Kalyana Commission	
34	Klarammayude Kla	Sahithya Pravarthaka Sahakarana Sangam & National Book Stall, Kottayam
35	Kumbakarna Kurup	Narasinha Vilasam Press
36	Kuthira Vaali	P.K Brothers, Kozhikodu
37	Kunju Lekshmi & Sons	Poorna Publications, Kozhikodu
38	Koriawala	Sree Ramavilasam Press, Kollam
39	Kya Boltha Hai	Sahithya Pravarthaka Sahakarana Sangam & National Book Stall, Kottayam
40	Grahappizhakal	Venus Press, Konni
41	Gas Trouble	Venus Press, Konni
42	Than Paathi Sarkar Paathi	Venus Press, Konni
43	Njekku Vilakku	N.B.S
44	Nallaal	Deepika Book House
45	Daivathe Thottal Thottavane Thattum	Venus Press, Konni
46	Padhathi Kollam, Pakshe	
47	Parithapam Paachulla	Poorna Publications, Kozhikodu
48	Pakkavada Paramu Nair	
49	Pukavali Paadilla	Deepika Book Depot
50	Pathampuram	
51	Paalam Apakadathil	Venus Press, Konni
52	Purampokkil Avaran	
53	Prakasam Akaleyanu	Royal Book Depot, Kottayam
54	Bharya Ariyapremam	
55	Fruit Salad	Keerthi Books, Kollam.
56	File Paampu	Venus Press, Konni
57	Kettiyonte Kuttam	Current Books, Kottayam
58	Rameswaram Model	
59	Thenganayude Akilenthya Paryadanam	Prabhath Book
60	Poovampazhathinte Niravum Karuthoru Marukum	Venus Press, Konni
61	Pennennu Paranjal Pennalla	P.K Brothers, Kozhikodu
62	Porikadala	Modern Books, Kollam
63	Pennu Kaanal	Royal Book Depot, Kottayam
64	Panchangam Undoo Panchangam	Narasinha Vilasam Press
65	Biscuitukal	
66	Madhura Naranga	N.B.S
67	Mathayude Suvishesham	Venus Press, Konni
68	Masappadi Maathu pilla	N.B.S
69	Masappadi Maathu pilla Ex.M.L.A	Narasinha Vilasam Press
70	Masappadiyude Arakshithavastha	Venus Press, Konni
71	Masappadiyude Vimochana Yaatra	Narasinha Vilasam Press
72	Bahu:mantri Maasappadi Maathupilla	Prabhath Printing & Publishing Company Ltd.
73	Masappadi Memorial	
74	Muthukkuda	
75	Muzhukkirukku	P.K Brothers, Kozhikodu
76	Masappadiyude Berlin Yaatra	N.B.S, Kottayam
77	Masappadi Productions	N.B.S, Kottayam
78	Onnu Vechal Randu Kittum	Current Books, Kottayam
79	Laathikal Laathikal	K&C Stores, Kunnamkulam.
80	Sanku Aliyan – I	Current Books, Kottayam
81	Sanku Aliyan – II	Current Books, Kottayam
82	Sesham Kazhchayil	
83	Sambalame Saranam	Vidyarthimithram, Kottayam.
84	Sanidasakkaran	Venus Press, Konni
85	Sabar Jal	
86	Sathyameva Jayathe	
87	Sangathi Nissaram	Venus Press, Konni
88	Sindbad	Thayyil Brothers
89	Second Saturday	Current Books, Kottayam
90	Computer Boy	Royal Book Depot, Kottayam
91	Retired Aayi	Venus Press, Konni
92	Nithya Kalyani Productions	Current Books, Kottayam
93	Ucha Bhashini	K&C Stores, Kunnamkulam.
94	Rasnadi podi	Current Books, Kottayam
95	Jeevikkan Padichaval	
96	Sundari Darsanam	Venus Press, Konni
97	Standard Oonu	
98	Vela Manasilirikkatte	Current Books, Kottayam
99	Veloor to Moscow	Venus Press, Konni
100	Varum Oro Dasa	
101	Vividhodhesam Vasupilla	Venus Press, Konni
102	German Kiss	N.B.S, Kottayam
103	Germaniyum Oru Madammayum	Prabhath Printing & Publishing Company Ltd.
104	Bra Bra Bri Bri	Keerthi Books, Kollam
105	Hair Kooplicate	Current Books, Kottayam
106	Ganapathi Homam	
107	Vere Vishesham Onnumilla	
108	Chumbana Prakasanam	Royal Book Depot, Kottayam
109	Jaathakavasal	Current Books, Kottayam
110	Mahilakale Oru Nimisham	Current Books, Kottayam
111	Ellam Imbamayam	Current Books, Kottayam
112	Ya Ya	Royal Book Depot, Kottayam
113	Yours Faithfully	Prabhath Printing & Publishing Company Ltd.
114	America Bahut Acha Hai	Prabhath Printing & Publishing Company Ltd.
115	Bharyahidam	Venus Press, Konni
116	I.G yude Makalude Kalyanam	
117	Kamalasanan and Co.	N.B.S, Kottayam
118	Eliyamma C/o USA	Current Books, Kottayam
119	Ee Number Nilavil illa	Current Books, Kottayam
120	Kalyaniyamma Vaka Bharthavu	Current Books, Kottayam
121	Haasya Sahithyam	
122	Abhinava Haasya Nikhandu	N.B.S, Kottayam
123	Hantha Saundaryame	Labella Publishers, Palarivattom, Ernakulam
124	Oruthane Thanne Ninachirunnal	
125	Vellarikka Pattanam	
126	Kalyanam Cheythu Kodukkapedum	Current Books, Kottayam
127	Beauty Parlor	Current Books, Kottayam
128	Veenapoovile Sathwikahasyam	Current Books, Kottayam
129	Chiriyude Charithram	Cultural Publication Department, Govt. of Kerala, Trivandrum
130	Adiyeda Avane	Royal Book Depot, Kottayam
131	Alpam Ninnal Solpam Parayam	Venus Press, Konni
132	Sangathi Nissaram	Venus Press, Konni
133	Ammathaan Dhanyaril Dhanya	Venus Press, Konni
134	Ellam Impamayam	Current Books, Kottayam
135	Kettiyonte Kuttam	Current Books, Kottayam
136	Pathu Chakkara Umma	Royal Book Depot, Kottayam
137	Ningal Aavasyapettathu	Royal Book Depot, Kottayam
138	Sarinu Ethra Makkalundu	Royal Book Depot, Kottayam
139	Ulppirivukal	Prabhath Printing & Publishing Company Ltd.
140	Kanne Madanguka	Prabhath Printing & Publishing Company Ltd.
141	Ennu Vaikunneram Naalu Mani	Prabhath Printing & Publishing Company Ltd.
142	Engane Ayal Daivam Enthu Cheyyum	Prabhath Printing & Publishing Company Ltd.
143	Haasyam	Narasimha Vilasam
144	Masam Thikayatha February	Keerthi Books, Kollam
145	Onnu Vechal Randu Kittum	Current Books, Kottayam
146	Ambili Ammavan	

== Awards ==
Sl.No	Award name	Year
1	Kerala Sahitya Akademi Award (Book Name: Vela Manasilirikkate)	1974
2	Ganaka Maha Sabha Award	1992
3	K. Karunakaran Sapthathy Smaraka Seva Kendram Award	1995
4	Thirumanasu Puraskaram, Sree Chithira thirunal Samskarika Vedi, Trivandrum	2001
5	S.S. Unnithan Foundation Award	2001
6	Gurukshetra Samajam Award	2001
7	Kannassa Award	2001
8	Vocational Achievement Award	2001
9	Kottayam Nagarasabha Sahithya Award	2001
10	E.V Krishnapilla Award	2003

== See also ==
- List of Malayalam-language authors
