= Kilimanoor Ramakanthan =

Indian Malayalam poet, writer and translator

Kilimanoor Ramakantan (2 August 1938 – 30 November 2009) was a renowned Malayalam poet, writer, translator and lyricist from Kerala, India. Dante's Divine Comedy was translated into Malayalam by Ramakanthan. This is the first translation of Divine Comedy in India.

== Biography ==
Ramakanthan was born in 1938 in Kilimanoor. Educated at Kilimanoor Rajaraja Varma High School, Thiruvananthapuram Arts College and University College. He worked as a teacher in Sreenarayana College, Kollam for a long time.

== Awards ==
- 2005 Asan Memorial award for Poetry
- Sahithya Academy Award for Best Translation
- Mooloor Award Kavitharangam Award
- Kavishresta Puraskaram by the Sree Narayana Academi
- Velutheri Kesavan Award

== Bibliography ==
=== Poems and anthology ===
- Anpathu Premaganangal, songs
- Marmaram
- Kalpantham
- Thrippadangalil [songs]
- Boottasing [Khandakavyam ]
- Kanneerinakkare
- Gurupatham
- Panthante pattu,
- Kilimanoor ramakanthante Kavithakal,
- Manushyamaramgal,
- Illa,
- Gopalakrishnante Kannukal,
- Iphigenia, Greek Drama
- Thachante Makante Makan
- Jeevithamudra, Khanda Kavyam
- Aro Oral
- Danteyude Nattil, Travel
- Kilimanoor Remakanthante Thiranjedutha kavithakal

=== Books on Kilimanoor Remakanthan ===
1. Orma kallukal by K.Indira [ Biography ]
2. Kilimanoor Remakanthan prakrithiye guruvakkiya kavi written by Malayalapuzha Sudhan { Criticism ]
3. Prakrithiyude snehagayakan by Nirmala Rajagopal [Biography ]
4. Kilimanoor Remakanthan [Biography 2 ]
5. JOTHIR GAMAYA essays edited by DR.D.BENJAMIN

=== Translations ===
Kilimanoor's Malayalam translation of Dante's Divine Comedy, published by Kendra Sahithya Academy, was the first translation of the Italian epic into any Indian language. He also translated Nikos Kazantzakis's The Odyssey: A Modern Sequel into Malayalam, where it was published in three parts by Kendra Sahithya Academy under the title Odyssey Aadhunika Anubandham.
