= E. T. Taison =

Indian politician

Comrade E. T. Taison
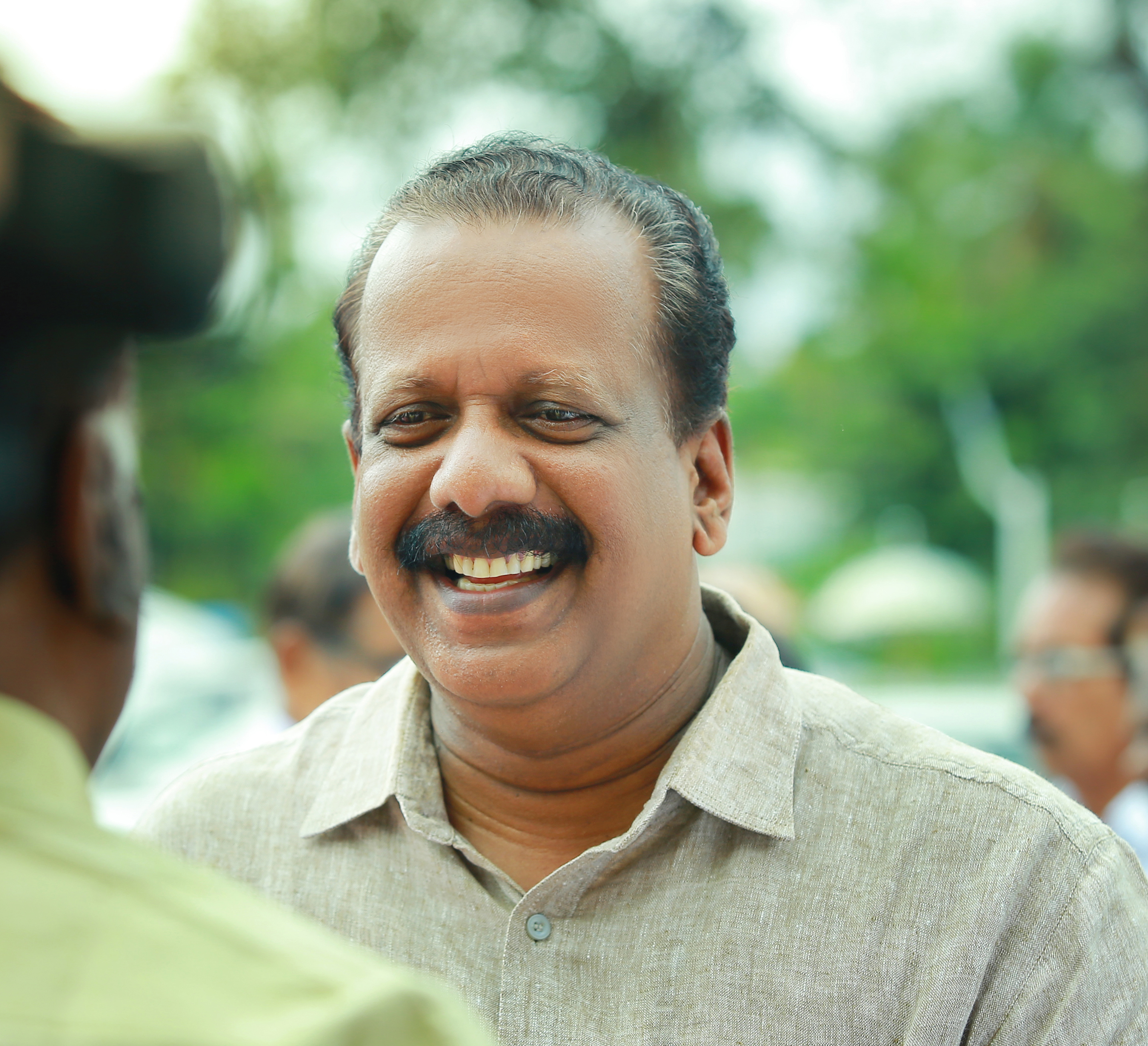

Member of the Kerala Legislative Assembly
- In office 2016–2026
- Preceded by: V. S. Sunil Kumar
- Succeeded by: K. K. Valsaraj
- Constituency: Kaipamangalam

Personal details
- Born: 20 January 1965 (age 61) Kodungallur
- Party: Communist Party of India
- Website: ettaisonmaster.com

Elanjikkal Thomas Taison is an Indian politician who served as a member of 15th Kerala State Legislative Assembly.

He is son of Smt. Anasthassia Thomas and Shri E. C. Thomas of the Elanjikkal house; born at Edavilangu, Thrissur on 20 January 1965. He studied Pre-Degree from MES Asmabi College, Kodungallur and Teachers Training Course (T.T.C) from Krishna Teachers Training Institute, Panangad. He worked as a Headmaster in High Schools in Thrissur District. He was a Member of C.P.I. District Committee, Thrissur; Secretary, C.P.I. Kaipamangalam Mandalam; Member, Edavilangu Grama Panchayat, Kodungallur Block Panchayat, Thrissur Jilla Panchayat.

Now, President, Manava Karunyasangam; Chairman, Bahadoor Smrithi Kendram; Patron, Daya Sadhu Jana Samrakshana Samithi.
