= Thrissur City Police =

Law enforcement agency in Kerala, India

Thrissur City Police തൃശൂര്‍ സിറ്റി പോലീസ്‌
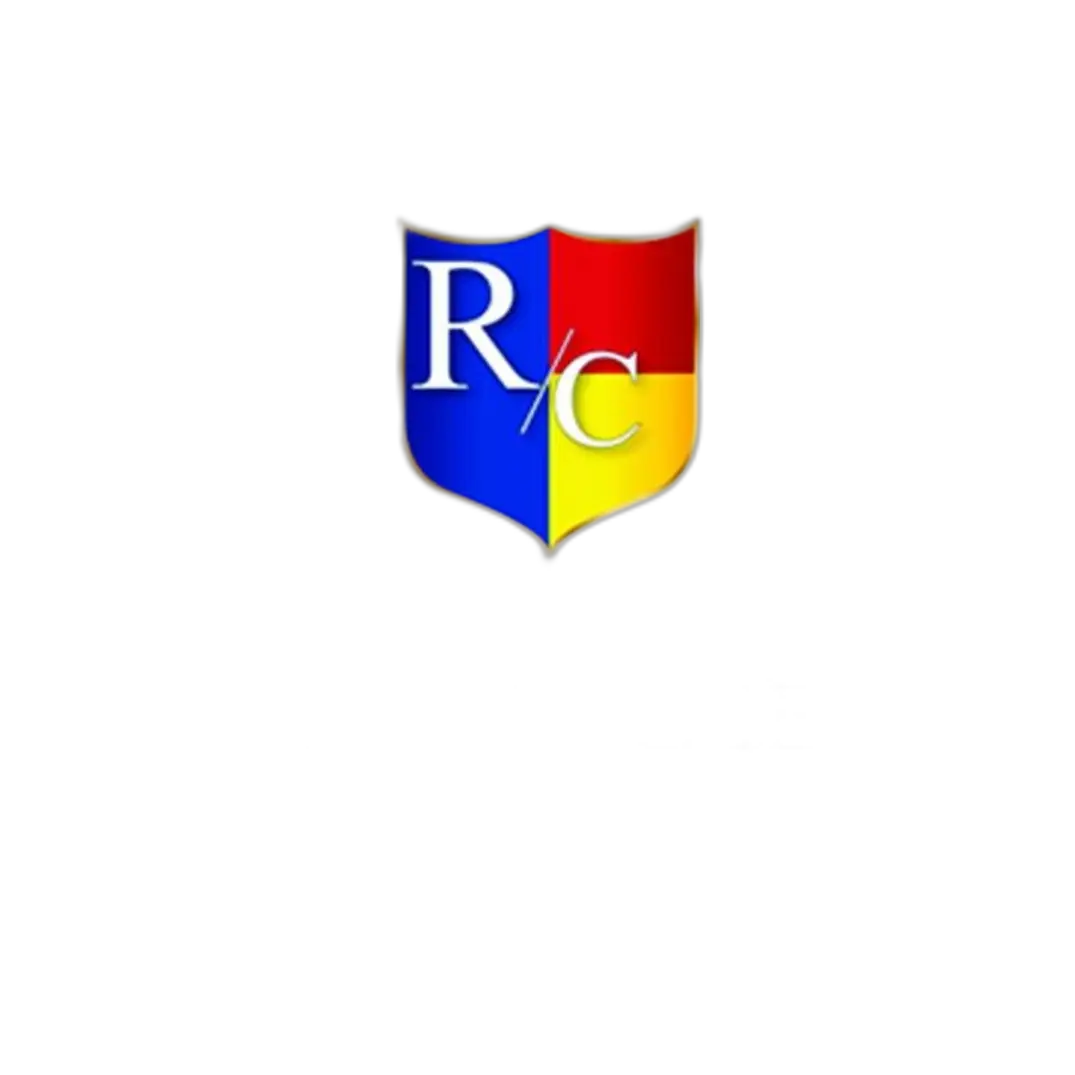

- The official flag of Kerala Police
- Abbreviation: TCP
- Motto: "Your Satisfaction is Our Pleasure"

Agency overview
- Formed: March 3, 2011
- Preceding agency: Thrissur District Police
- Employees: 752

Jurisdictional structure
- Operations jurisdiction: Thrissur Metropolitan Area; Guruvayoor, Kunnamkulam, Ollur, Thrissur City, India
- Area: 570.79 km^{2}
- Legal jurisdiction: Thrissur Municipal Corporation, Guruvayoor, Chelakkara, Wadakkanchery, Kunnamkulam, Chavakkad
- General nature: Local civilian police

Operational structure
- Overseen by: Home Department, Government of Kerala
- Headquarters: The Office of Commissioner of Police, Municipal Office Road, Thrissur
- Elected officer responsible: Ramesh Chennithala, Minister for Home and Vigilance, Govt of Kerala
- Agency executive: Nakul Rajendra Deshmukh IPS, Commissioner of Police
- Parent agency: Kerala Police
- Units: List: Control Room; Crime Detachment; Women Police (Vanitha Cell); Foreigners Registration Office; District Crime Records Bureau; Dog Squad; City Special Branch; District Armed Reserve; Traffic Unit; Special Branch (SB)
- Subdivisions: 4: Thrissur; Kunnamkulam; Guruvayur; Ollur

Facilities
- Stations: 24

Website
- thrissurcity.keralapolice.gov.in

Thrissur City Police (TCPD) (Malayalam: തൃശൂര്‍ സിറ്റി പോലീസ്‌ ), a division of the Kerala Police, is the law enforcement agency Thrissur City , Kunnamkulam and the temple town of Guruvayoor. The city police force is headed by a Commissioner of Police, an IPS officer, and the administrative control vests with the Home Ministry of Kerala. Thrissur City Police is the largest Police District in Kerala state covering an area of 570.79 Square kilometre.

The city police came into existence on March 3, 2011, after dividing the Thrissur District Police. The police commissionerate is situated in Thrissur City. The commissionerate cover 24 police stations and has four sub-divisions, Thrissur, Ollur, Guruvayur and Kunnamkulam. Nakul Rajendra Deshmukh IPS, is the current Police Commissioner of Thrissur.

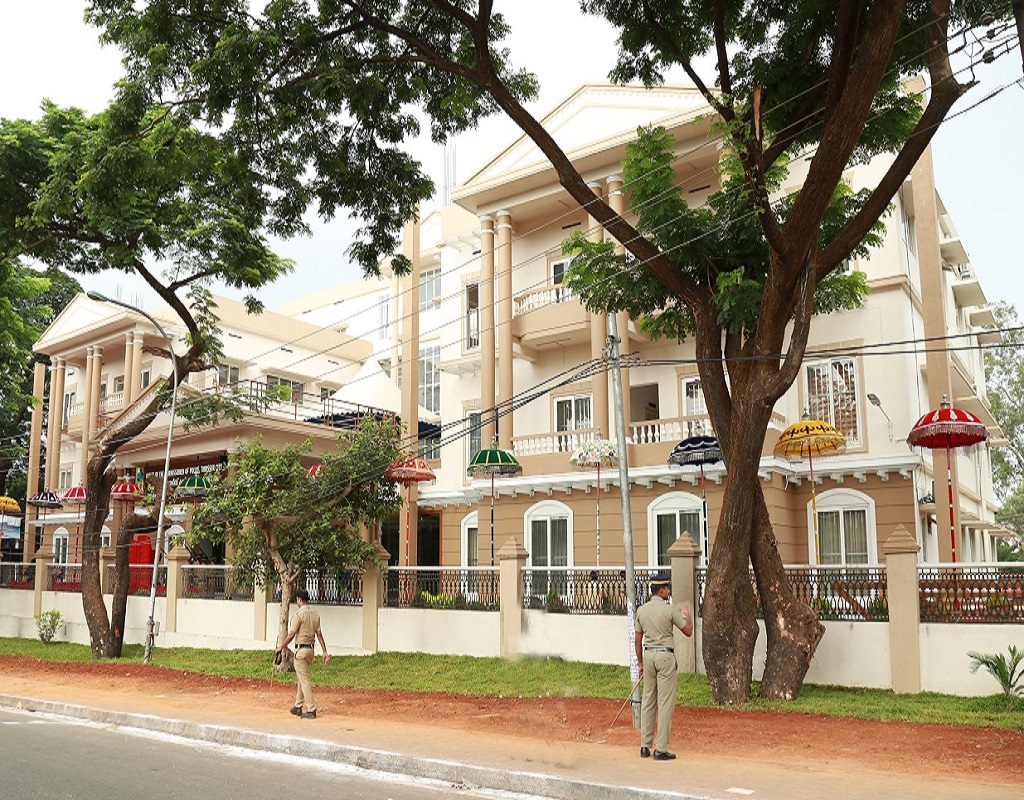
Office of the Thrissur Police Commissioner and District Police Chief, Thrissur City

== Organization ==
The Thrissur City Police is headed by a Commissioner of Police (CP), an SP-ranked officer of the IPS Kerala Cadre. The Commissioner is assisted by an Additional Deputy Commissioner of police at the city police headquarters. He is also assisted by Assistant Commissioners of Police (ACPs) of the rank of DySP/ ASP, who head police subdivisions and other special units.

The City Police Commissioner reports to Deputy Inspector General (DIG) of Thrissur Range.

For the maintenance of law and order, the Thrissur City Police District is divided into four police subdivisions and various police stations, each headed by an Assistant Commissioner of Police (ACP) and an Inspector of Police (IP), respectively.

Officers:

- Commissioner of Police / District Police Chief
- Additional Deputy Commissioner of Police (Administration)
- Deputy Commandant
- Assistant Commissioner of Police Thrissur
- Assistant Commissioner of Police Ollur
- Assistant Commissioner of Police Kunnamkulam
- Assistant Commissioner of Police Guruvayur
- Assistant Commissioner of Police District Crime Branch
- Assistant Commissioner of Police District Special Branch
- Assistant Commissioner of Police District Crime Records Bureau
- Assistant Commissioner of Police Narcotics Cell

Subordinates:

- Inspector of Police (IP)
- Sub-Inspector of Police (SI)
- Assistant Sub Inspector of Police (ASI)
- Senior Civil Police Officer (SCPO)
- Civil Police Officer (CPO)

== Police Stations under Thrissur Commissionerate ==
- Cyber Crime Police Station

=== Thrissur Subdivision ===
- Town East Police Station
- Town West Police Station
- Traffic Police Station
- Vanitha Police Station
- Nedupuzha Police Station
- Permangalam Police Station
- Medical College Police Station
- District Command and Control Room

=== Ollur Subdivision ===
- Ollur Police Station
- Mannuthy Police Station
- Peechi Police Station
- Viyyur Police Station

=== Guruvayur Subdivision ===
- Temple Police Station
- Guruvayur Police Station
- Pavaratty Police Station
- Chavakkad Police Station
- Vadakkekad Police Station
- Munakkakadavu Costal Police Station

=== Kunnamkulam Subdivision ===
- Kunnamkulam Police Station
- Erumapetty Police Station
- Wadakkancheery Police Station
- Cheruthuruthy Police Station
- Chelakkara Police Station
- Pazhayannur Police Station

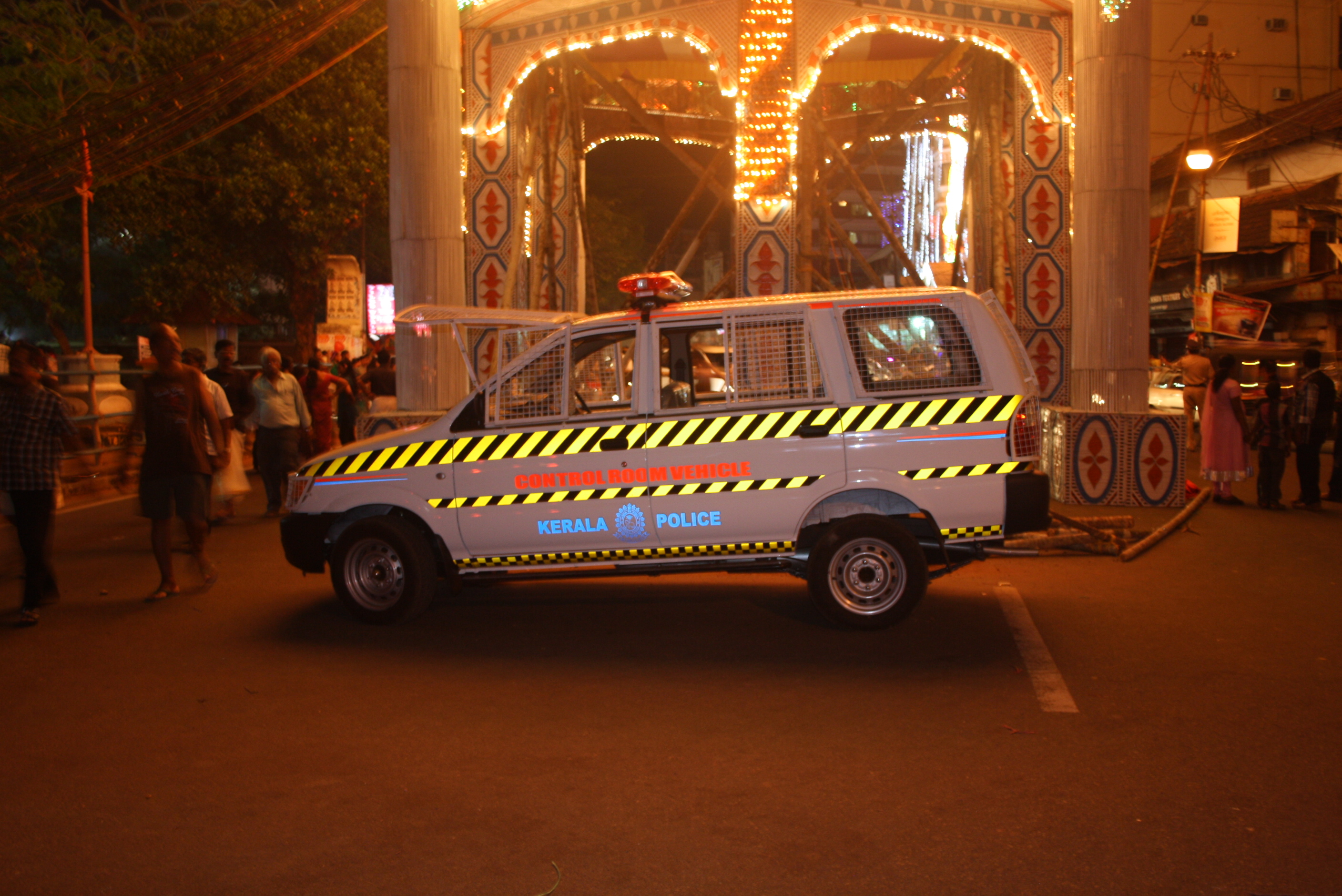
Patrol Vehicle of Thrissur City Police in Swaraj Round

== Thrissur Police Commissioners ==
- 1. P Vijayan (3 March 2011 – 31 December 2012)
- 2. P. Prakash (1 January 2013 – 22 August 2014)
- 3. Jacob Thomas (23 August 2014 – 11 February 2015)
- 4. R. Nishanthini (12 February 2015 – 14 July 2015)
- 5. K.G. Simon (15 July 2015 – 12 June 2016)
- 6. Dr J. Himendranath (13 June 2016 – 6 January 2017)
- 7. T. Narayanan (6 January 2017 – 9 August 2017)
- 8. Rahul R Nair (10 August 2017 – 8 May 2018)
- 9. G.H. Yatheesh Chandra (9 May 2018 - 8 January 2020)
- 10. R. Adithya ( 8 January 2020 - 15 November 2022)
- 11. Ankit Asok (19 November 2022– 19 June, 2024)
- 12. R Ilango (20 June 2024 - 4 October, 2025)
- 13. Nakul Rajendra Deshmukh (5 October - present)
