= V. R. Sunil Kumar =

Indian politician

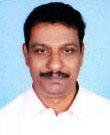

Member of the Kerala Legislative Assembly
- In office 2016–2026
- Constituency: Kodungallur constituency
- Preceded by: T. N. Prathapan
- Succeeded by: O. J. Janeesh

Personal details
- Born: 10 March 1969 (age 57) Kodungallur
- Party: Communist Party of India
- Spouse: Sreebha. R
- Children: Salvador.VS, Salveor VS

V. Rajan Sunil Kumar (born 10 March 1969) is an Indian politician who served as a member of 14th and 15th Kerala Legislative Assembly. He represented Kodungallur constituency and belongs to Communist Party of India. He is the son of V. K. Rajan, a four-time member of Kerala Legislative assembly and the former minister of Agriculture.

== Personal life ==
Kumar was born as son of V.K. Rajan (Ex. Minister) and K.K. Sathy on 10 March 1969 at Kodungallur, Thrissur district. He is married to Sreebha R and the couple have two sons.

== Education ==
He holds B.A. and LL.B. degrees.

== Political career ==
He was Secretary Mandalam Committee and Member, State Council, AISF, AIYF, AITUC; Kodungalloor Mandalam Committee Secretary and District Committee Member, C.P.I.
