= E. Gopalakrishna Menon =

Indian politician

E. Gopalakrishna Menon (16 January 1919 – 8 September 1996) was an Indian legislator and a leader of the Communist Party of India. He was the first communist legislator of Independent India. He had won the by-election to the Kochi Legislative Assembly in 1949. He was elected to the Travancore Cochin Legislative Assembly in 1952. He was elected to the First Kerala Legislative Assembly in 1957 and Fourth K.L.A in 1970 from Kodungallur Constituency.
