= Kaipamangalam Assembly constituency =

Constituency of the Kerala legislative assembly in India

Kaipamangalam
- Constituency No. 69 for the Kerala Legislative Assembly
- Kaipamangalam In Thrissur District

Constituency details
- Country: India
- Region: South India
- State: Kerala
- District: Thrissur
- Established: 2008
- Total electors: 1,73,965 (2021)
- Reservation: None

Member of Legislative Assembly
- 16th Kerala Legislative Assembly
- Incumbent K. K. Valsaraj
- Party: CPI
- Alliance: LDF
- Elected year: 2026

Kaipamangalam State assembly constituency is one of the 140 state legislative assembly constituencies in Kerala. It is also one of the seven state legislative assembly constituencies included in Chalakudy Lok Sabha constituency. As of the 2026 assembly elections, the current MLA is K. K. Valsaraj of CPI.

== Local self-governed segments ==
Kaipamangalam Assembly constituency is composed of the following local self-governed segments:

Sl no.	Name	Status (Grama panchayat/Municipality)	Taluk
1	Edavilangu	Grama panchayat	Kodungallur
2	Edathiruthy	Grama panchayat	Kodungallur
3	Eriyad	Grama panchayat	Kodungallur
4	Kaipamangalam	Grama panchayat	Kodungallur
5	Mathilakam	Grama panchayat	Kodungallur
6	Perinjanam	Grama panchayat	Kodungallur
7	Sreenarayanapuram	Grama panchayat	Kodungallur

== Members of Legislative Assembly ==
Election	Niyama Sabha	Name	Party	Tenure
2011	13th	V. S. Sunil Kumar	Communist Party of India	2011 – 2016
2016	14th	E. T. Taison	Communist Party of India	2016 – 2021
2021	15th	E. T. Taison	Communist Party of India	2021 - 2026
2026	16th	K. K. Valsaraj	Communist Party of India	Incumbent

== Election results ==
=== 2026 ===
2026 Kerala Legislative Assembly election: Kaipamangalam
Party	Candidate	Votes	%	±%
CPI	K. K. Valsaraj	65,448	45.81	▼7.95
INC	T. M. Nazar	55,504	38.85	▲1.77
BDJS	Athulliaghosh Vettiyattil	19,688	13.78	▲7.12
AAP	Jayan Eratt	653	0.46	
SDPI	A. M. Muhammed Riyas	536	0.38	▼0.22
CPI(ML) Red Star	Manoj M. M.	335	0.23	
NOTA	None of the above	690	0.48	▲0.14
Margin of victory		9,944	6.96	▼9.72
Turnout		1,42,854		
CPI hold		Swing	▼7.95	

=== 2021 ===
There were 1,73,965 registered voters in the constituency for the 2021 election.

2021 Kerala Legislative Assembly election: Kaipamangalam
Party	Candidate	Votes	%	±%
CPI	E. T. Taison	73,161	53.76	▲4.16
INC	Shoba Subin	50,463	37.08	−
BDJS	C. D. Sreelal	9,066	6.66	▼15.64
WPOI	M. K. Aslam	1,671	1.23	▼0.26
SDPI	M.K. Shameer	814	0.60	−
NOTA	None of the above	466	0.34	−
BSP	Thankamany Tharayil	442	0.32	−
Margin of victory		22,698	16.68	▼8.14
Turnout		1,73,965	78.22	▼1.07
CPI hold		Swing	▲4.16	

=== 2016 ===
There were 1,69,907 registered voters in the constituency for the 2016 election.

2016 Kerala Legislative Assembly election: Kaipamangalam
Party	Candidate	Votes	%	±%
CPI	E. T. Taison	66,824	49.60	▼0.60
RSP	M. T. Muhammed Nahas	33,384	24.78	−
BDJS	Unnikrishnan Thashnath	30,041	22.30	−
WPOI	K. K. Shahjahan	2,002	1.49	−
PDP	Abdul Kareem P. M.	624	0.46	−
NOTA	None of the above	565	0.46	−
Independent	P. A. Kuttapan	257	0.19	−
Independent	Biju Ittithara	238	0.18	−
CPI(M)	N. D. Venu	227	0.17	−
Margin of victory		33,440	24.82	▲13.21
CPI hold		Swing	▼0.60	
Turnout		1,34,726	79.29	▲3.30

=== 2011 ===
There were 1,79,535 registered voters in the constituency for the 2011 election.

2011 Kerala Legislative Assembly election: Kaipamangalam
Party	Candidate	Votes	%	±%
CPI	V. S. Sunil Kumar	58,789	50.20	
JSS	Umesh Challiyil	45,219	38.61	
BJP	A. N. Radhakrishnan	10,716	9.15	
Independent	M. M. Manoj	937	0.80	−
BSP	P. A. Kuttapan	811	0.69	
Independent	C. U. Nimi	638	0.54	
Independent	P. A. Kuttapan	257	0.19	−
Margin of victory		13,570	11.59	
CPI win (new seat)				
Turnout		1,32,379	75.99	
