= Nattika Assembly constituency =

Constituency of the Kerala legislative assembly in India

Nattika
- Constituency No. 68 for the Kerala Legislative Assembly
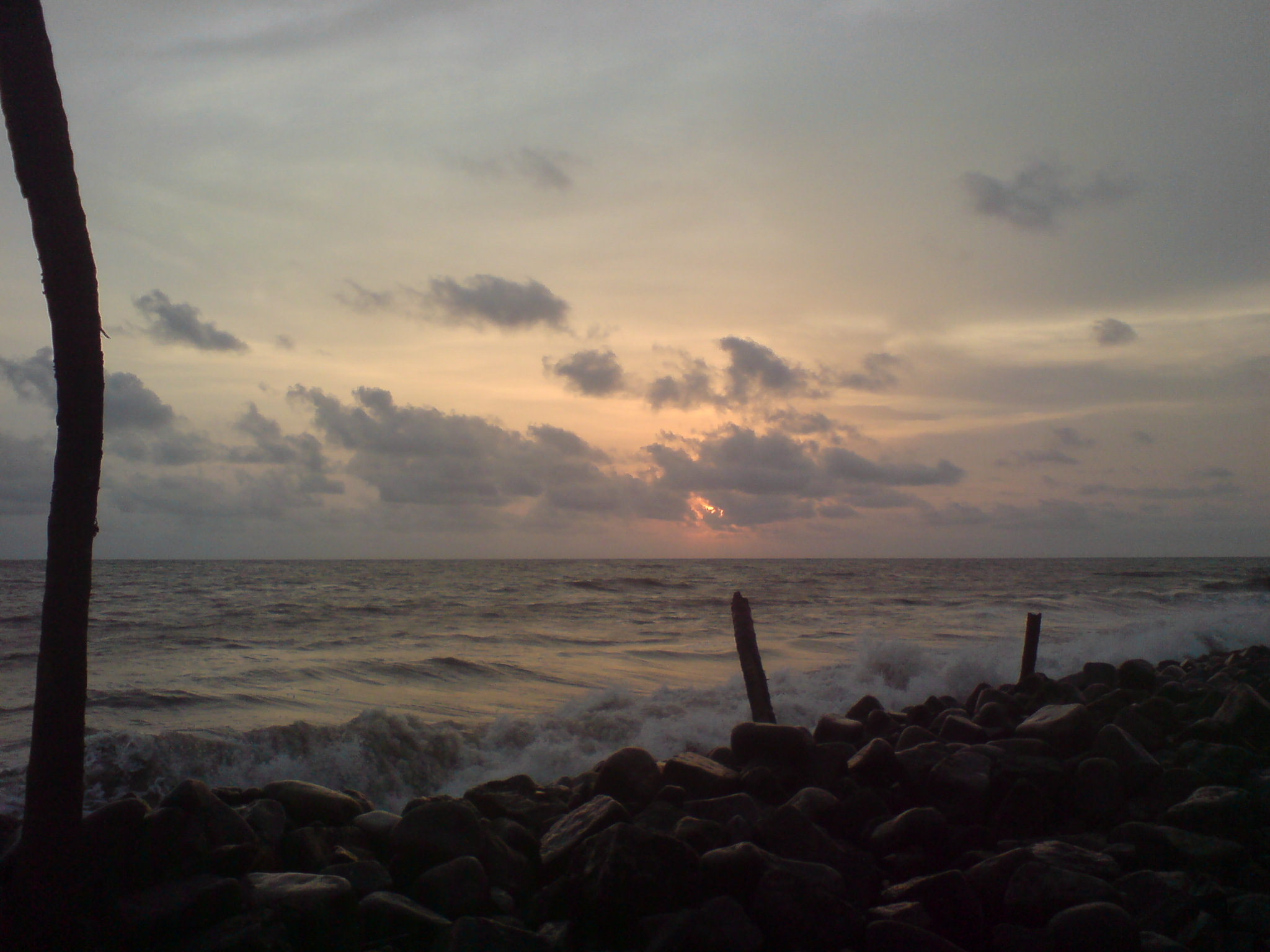
- Nattika Beach

Constituency details
- Country: India
- Region: South India
- State: Kerala
- District: Thrissur
- Established: 1951
- Total electors: 1,96,781 (2016)
- Reservation: SC

Nattika is one of the 140 state legislative assembly constituencies in Kerala. It is also one of the seven state legislative assembly constituencies included in Thrissur Lok Sabha constituency. As of the 2026 Assembly elections, the current MLA is Geetha Gopi of CPI.

== Local self-governed segments ==
Nattika Assembly constituency is composed of the following local self-governed segments:

Sl no.	Name	Status (Grama panchayat/Municipality)	Taluk
1	Nattika	Grama panchayat	Chavakkad
2	Valapad	Grama panchayat	Chavakkad
3	Thalikulam	Grama panchayat	Chavakkad
4	Anthikad	Grama panchayat	Thrissur
5	Avinissery	Grama panchayat	Thrissur
6	Chazhoor	Grama panchayat	Thrissur
7	Cherpu	Grama panchayat	Thrissur
8	Paralam	Grama panchayat	Thrissur
9	Thanniyam	Grama panchayat	Thrissur

== Members of the Legislative Assembly ==
The following list contains all members of Kerala Legislative Assembly who have represented the constituency:

Election	Niyama Sabha	Member	Party	Tenure
1957	1st	K. S. Achuthan	Indian National Congress	1957 - 1960
1960	2nd	K. T. Achuthan	Indian National Congress	1960 - 1965
1967	3rd	T. K. Krishnan	Communist Party of India	1967 – 1970
1970	4th	V. K. Gopinathan	Samyukta Socialist Party	1970 - 1977
1977	5th	P. K. Gopalakrishnan	Communist Party of India	1977 - 1980
1980	6th	P. K. Gopalakrishnan	Communist Party of India	1980 – 1982
1982	7th	Sidharthan Kattungal	Independent	1982 – 1987
1987	8th	Krishnan Kaniyamparambil	Communist Party of India	1987 – 1991
1991	9th	Krishnan Kaniyamparambil	Communist Party of India	1991 – 1996
1996	10th	Krishnan Kaniyamparambil	Communist Party of India	1996 – 2001
2001	11th	T. N. Prathapan	Indian National Congress	2001 – 2006
2006	12th	T. N. Prathapan	Indian National Congress	2006 – 2011
Major boundary changes
2011	13th	Geetha Gopi	Communist Party of India	2011 – 2016
2016	14th	Geetha Gopi	Communist Party of India	2016 – 2021
2021	15th	C. C. Mukundan	Communist Party of India	2021-2026
2026	16th	Geetha Gopi	Communist Party of India	Incumbent

== Election results ==
=== 2026 ===
2026 Kerala Legislative Assembly election: Nattika
Party	Candidate	Votes	%	±%
CPI	Geetha Gopi	58,979	37.44	▼10.05
INC	Adv. Sunil Laloor	51,886	32.94	▲3.96
BJP	C. C. Mukundan	45,216	28.70	▲6.74
NOTA	None of the above	1,454	0.92	▲0.32
Margin of victory		7,093	4.50	▼14.01
Turnout		1,57,535		
CPI hold		Swing	▼10.05	

=== 2021 ===
2021 Kerala Legislative Assembly election: Nattika (SC)
Party	Candidate	Votes	%	±%
CPI	C. C. Mukundan	72,930	47.49	▲0.85
INC	Adv. Sunil Laloor	44,499	28.98	▲0.12
BJP	Lojanan Ambatt	33,716	21.96	▼0.4
NOTA	None of the above	903	0.60	−
BSP	Vimal Mallika Vijayan	367	0.24	−
Independent	C. S. Jitheshkumar	617	0.4	−
Independent	Sivarathnan Alathi	595	0.39	−
Margin of victory		28,431	18.51	
Turnout		1,53,554		
CPI hold		Swing	▲0.85	

=== 2016 ===
There were 1,96,781 registered voters in the constituency for the 2016 election.

2016 Kerala Legislative Assembly election: Nattika (SC)
Party	Candidate	Votes	%	±%
CPI	Geetha Gopi	70,218	46.65	▼3.56
INC	K. V. Dasan	43,441	28.86	−
BDJS	T. V. Babu	33,650	22.36	−
NOTA	None of the above	903	0.60	−
PDP	Arumughan Snehatheeram	534	0.35	−
BSP	A. K. Santosh	530	0.35	▼0.12
Independent	T. K. Prasad	502	0.33	−
CPI(ML) Red Star	N. M. Pushpangadhan	253	0.17	−
Independent	Chandran Vakeel	168	0.11	−
Independent	Ninu K. B.	163	0.11	−
IGP	Sivadas N.	150	0.10	−
Margin of victory		26,777	17.79	▲5.28
CPI hold		Swing	▼3.56	
Turnout		1,50,512	76.49	▲4.87

=== 2011 ===
There were 1,79,535 registered voters in the constituency for the 2011 election.

2011 Kerala Legislative Assembly election: Nattika (SC)
Party	Candidate	Votes	%	±%
CPI	Geetha Gopi	64,555	50.21	
Independent	Vikas Chakrapani	48,501	37.72	
BJP	Sarju Thoykkavu	11,144	8.67	
Independent	Dinesh Kumar E. V.	1,636	1.27	
Independent	M. S. Vasanthy	826	0.64	
BSP	P. K. Subramanian	600	0.47	
Independent	N. V. Mani	513	0.40	
Independent	C. K. Chandran	497	0.39	
Independent	Pushpakaran	310	0.24	
Margin of victory		16,054	12.51	
CPI gain from INC		Swing		
Turnout		1,28,582	71.62	

=== 1952 ===
1952 Madras Legislative Assembly election: Nattika
Party	Candidate	Votes	%	±%
CPI	Gopalakrishnan	21,604	39.07%	
INC	Raman	21,125	38.21%	38.21%
Independent	Abdullakutty Sahib	7,160	12.95%	
Socialist Party (India)	Divakaran Andezeth	5,404	9.77%	
Margin of victory		479	0.87%	
Turnout		55,293	72.29%	
Registered electors		76,491		
CPI win (new seat)				
