= V. S. Sunil Kumar =

Indian minister

Adv. V. S. Sunil Kumar
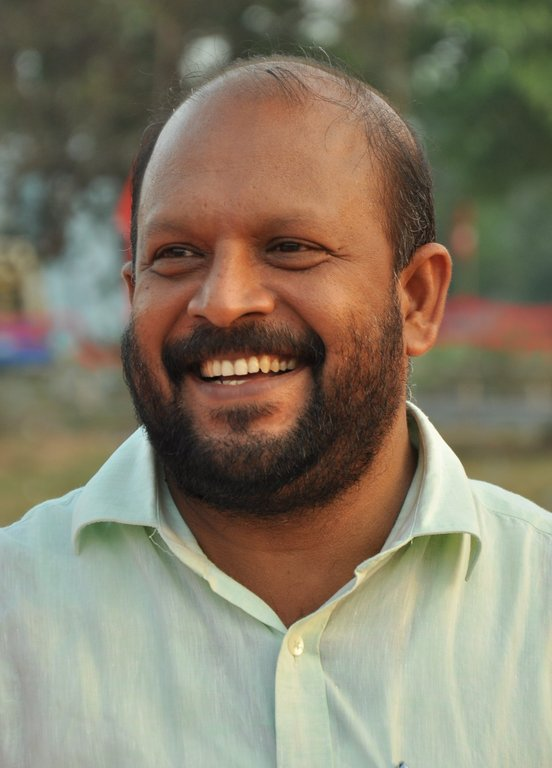

Minister for Agriculture
- In office 25 May 2016 – 3 May 2021
- Preceded by: K. P. Mohanan
- Succeeded by: P. Prasad

Member of the Legislative Assembly
- In office 25 May 2016 – 3 May 2021
- Preceded by: Therambil Ramakrishnan
- Succeeded by: P. Balachandran
- Constituency: Thrissur
- In office 2011 – 2016
- Preceded by: Established
- Succeeded by: E. T. Taison
- Constituency: Kaipamangalam
- In office 2006 – 2011
- Preceded by: K. P. Rajendran
- Succeeded by: Dissolved
- Constituency: Cherpu

Personal details
- Born: 30 May 1967 (age 59) Anthikad, Thrissur, Kerala, India
- Party: Communist Party of India
- Spouse: Adv. Rekha
- Children: Niranjan Krishna
- Parents: V. S. Subrahmannian; C. K. Premavathy
- Education: Sree Kerala Varma College, Thrissur; Kerala Law Academy Law College, Thiruvananthapuram
- Website: http://www.minister-agriculture.kerala.gov.in

V. S. Sunil Kumar (born 30 May 1967) is an Indian politician and the former Minister for Agriculture, Kerala. In 2011, he was elected from Kaipamangalam constituency and in 2016, from Thrissur constituency to Kerala Legislative Assembly.

He is a member of the Communist Party of India. He started his political career with All India Students' Federation at time of his high school life. He is an alumnus of Sree Kerala Varma College, Thrissur and completed his LL.B from Kerala Law Academy Law College, Thiruvananthapuram. He was holding different posts in AISF State and National level and in 1998, was the National Secretary.

== Personal life ==
He is born to V. S. Subrahmannian and C. K. Premavathy. He is married to Adv. Rekha and has a son Niranjan Krishna.
