= Meenakshi Thampan =

Indian politician

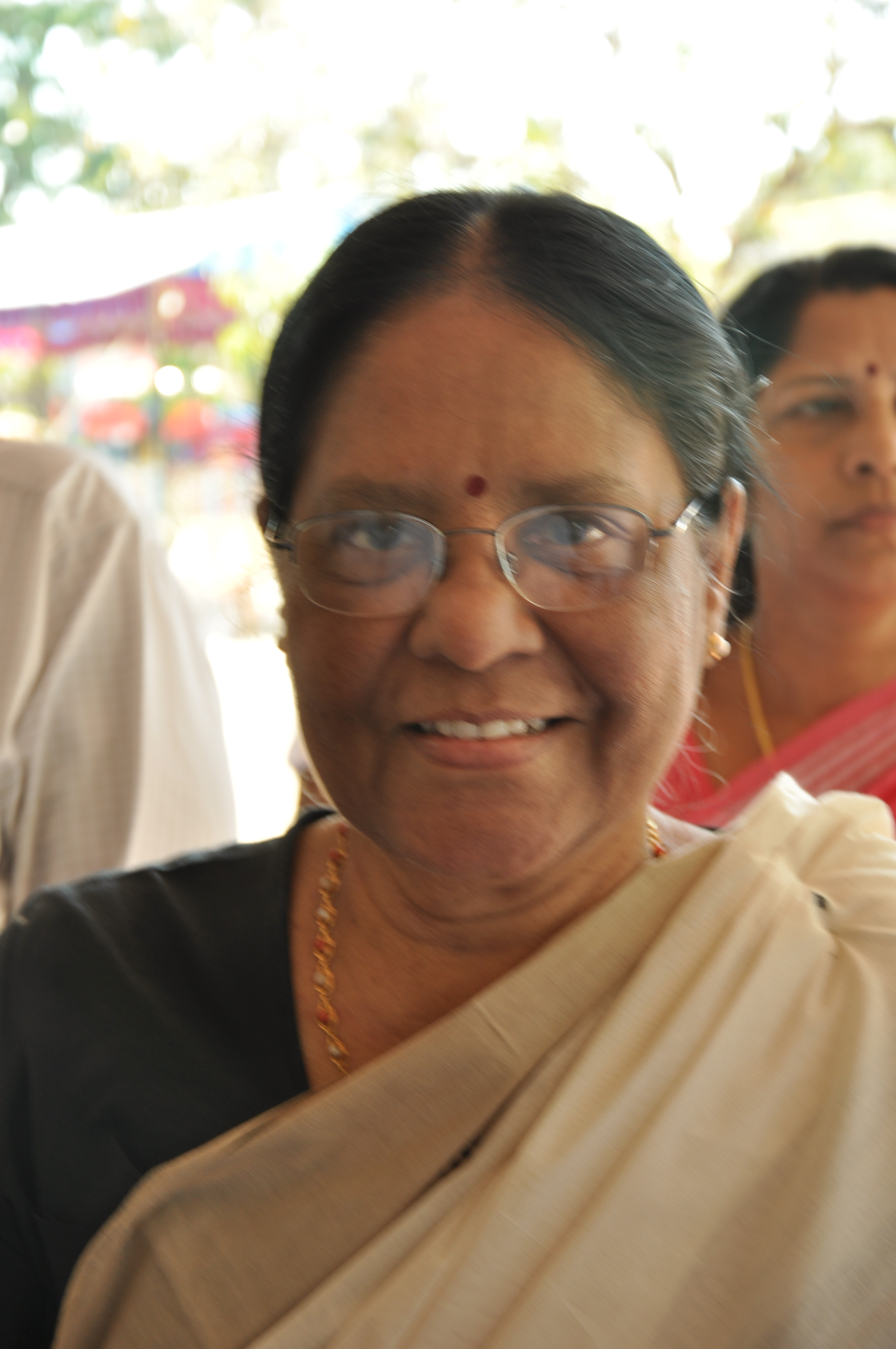

Member of the Kerala Legislative Assembly
- In office 1991–96, 1996–2001; 10 years
- Constituency: Kodungallur Assembly Constituency

Personal details
- Born: 5 December 1941 (age 84) Palakkad, Kerala
- Party: Communist Party of India
- Spouse: K. R. Thampan
- Children: 2 sons and 1 daughter

Meenakshi Thampan is an Indian politician, a member of the Communist Party of India from Thrissur district, Kerala. She was a Member of the Legislative Assembly from Kodungallur Assembly Constituency in 1991 – 1996 and 1996–2001. She was the member of Kerala State Women's Commission.
