= P. K. Gopalakrishnan =

Indian parliamentarian

P. K. Gopalakrishnan (March 1924 - 14 September 2009) was an Indian parliamentarian and a leader of the Communist Party of India. He was the Deputy Speaker in the fifth Kerala Legislative Assembly from 6 July 1977 to 23 October 1979.

== Biography ==
Gopalakrishnan was a member in the First Legislative Assembly of Madras constituted under the Constitution of India, representing the Nattika Constituency in the Madras Assembly from 1952 to 1956.

He was elected to the Kerala Legislative Assembly in 1967 from Kodungallur Constituency. He was again elected to the Fifth K.L.A. (1977 to 1979) and Sixth K.L.A. (1980 to 1982) from the Nattika Constituency. He was also the recipient of Kerala Sahitya Akademi Award.

Gopalakrishnan was married to M. Omana, they have two daughters. He died on 14 September 2009.
