= C. C. Mukundan =

Indian politician

Member of the Kerala Legislative Assembly for Nattika
- In office 24 May 2021 – 23 May 2026

Personal details
- Born: Kerala
- Party: Bharatiya Janata Party (since 2026)
- Other political affiliations: Communist Party of India (till 2026)

C. C. Mukundan is an Indian politician representing the Bharatiya Janata Party and he formerly served as the MLA of Nattika Constituency from May 2021 to May 2026 as a member of the Communist Party of India. He had been expelled from the CPI after being a member of that party for 40 years, having first made a name for himself as a trade union leader. Mukundan had been approached by the Aam Aadmi Party, but ultimately joined the BJP instead.

== Electoral history ==
Kerala Legislative Assembly elections
Year	Constituency	Party	Votes	Vote share	Result	Margin	Ref.
2021	Nattika	CPI	72,930	47.49%	Won	28,431	
2026	Nattika	BJP	45,216	28.70%	Lost	13,763	
