= Krishnan Kaniyamparambil =

Indian politician

Krishnan Kaniyamparambil (1948 - 12 February 2005) was an Indian politician who was the Minister of Agriculture from 9 June 1997 to 13 May 2001. He was the secretary of the Communist Party of India Legislature Party from 1967 to 1969 in Kerala.

== Biography ==
He was entering politics in 1965, through the CPI, he was actively involved in political activities early from school days. Later, he became active in the trade union field as well. He had to endure police assault, and also had to undergo imprisonment for a week, in connection with an AISF agitation, in 1968.

He became elected to the Kerala Legislative Assembly thrice, in 1987, 1991 and 1996 from Nattika constituency, contesting as CPI candidate. He had served as the Minister for Agriculture from 9 June 1997 to 13 May 2001, in the Ministry headed by Shri. E.K. Nayanar. He had likewise a remarkable stint as the Chairman of the Committee on Government Assurances during 1991- 1996, and the Committee on Estimates from 1996 to 1997.

A member of State Committee of CPI, he had served at different times, also as the Secretary, Thrissur District Committee of CPI, District President, Bharatiya Khet Mazdoor Union, and State President of All India Federation of Fishermen.

Smt. Lathika was his wife and they had two sons.

Shri. Krishnan Kaniyamparambil died 12 February 2005.
