= Thrissur in popular culture =

This article aims to compile various depictions of Thrissur in popular culture.

== Films ==
- Thoovanathumbikal: Malayalam director Padmarajan's film Thoovanathumbikal was shot in Thrissur city. Almost all the main characters speak with a Thrissur accent for Malayalam. The character played by the lead actor Mohanlal was based on a citizen of Thrissur, Mannarthodi jayakrishnan, and his friends like Vijayan Karot.
- Pranchiyettan and The Saint: Malayalam director Ranjith's film Pranchiyettan and The Saint is based on Thrissur's Rice Bazaar. Malayalam actor Mammootty plays the lead role of a Thrissur-based rice vendor merchant, Francis a.k.a. Ari Pranchi.
- Punyalan Agarbattis: Directed by Ranjith Sankar, Punyalan Agarbattis tell the story of a young entrepreneur from Thrissur city, Joy Thakkolkaran which is played by Jayasurya.
- Sapthamashree Thaskaraha: Shot in the prime backdrop of Thrissur city, this satire film is directed by Anil Radhakrishnan Menon and tells the story of seven thief’s.
- Mathai Kuzhappakkaranalla: Jayasurya's character from Thrissur does a role of an innocent auto driver who unnecessarily interferes into the problems of others with a good intention of solving them.
- Punyalan Private Limited a sequence of movie Punyalan Agarbattis directed by Ranjith Sankar released in 2017.
- Diwanjimoola Grand Prix was the film shot in different locations in and around Thrissur town released in 2018.
- Abraham Ozler was shot in Thrissur and nearby districts. The movie takes place in Thrissur, and follows Jayaram as an officer in the Thrissur City Police.

== Novels ==
- Malayalam writer Sarah Joseph's works are generally set in the background of city of Thrissur and nearby areas.
