= Kattukkaran Varunny Joseph =

Indian film distribution executive

- Born: 27 November 1871; Ollur, Thrissur, Kerala
- Died: 26 May 1925 (aged 53); Thrissur, Kerala, India
- Occupations: Film distribution, businessman
- Known for: Jose Electrical Bioscope

Kattukkaran Varunny Joseph (also known as Jose Kattookkaran and shortly, Kattukkaran Varunny) who is known as "Father of Malayalam cinema and theatre industry" was an industrialist who established the former film exhibiting company in Kerala named Royal Exhibitors. He started Jos Theatre in Thrissur which is the first permanent theatre in Kerala and Davison Theatre in Kozhikode under Royal Exhibitors. He had established the first electrically operated film projector Jose Electrical Bioscope at Ollur, Thrissur city in 1913.

== Early life ==
Varunny was born on 26 November 1871 in Ollur a suburban area of Thrissur, Kerala, India. He died on 26 May 1925.

== History of film exhibition ==
Varunny purchased the first projector and a few movies from railway officer Vincent Paul who bought the setup from a French exhibitor, and had the first showcase in Thrissur, under the banner Jose Bioscope In early 1907. His first exhibition was in Thekkinkadu Maidan in connection with the Thrissur Pooram at the same year. He used a manual projector and a tent that could fit around hundred people at a time, showcasing videos of blooming flowers, horse races and the life of Christ with unrelated narrations that nevertheless astounded the crowd. He toured all of south India with his Jose Bioscope and eventually established the first electrically operated film projection named Jose Electrical Bioscope, with the advent of electricity, in 1913. An unprecedented disaster struck when he lost his bioscope to a storm, when sailing from Mangalore after an exhibition. Not one to give up, K V Joseph founded Royal Exhibitors Company, in partnership with a few others. He also eventually founded Babysun Talkies, laying the foundation for film exhibition in Kerala.
