= Excise Academy and Research Centre =

Excise training centre in Kerala, India

State Excise Academy and Research Centre, Kerala
- SEARC സ്റ്റേറ്റ് എക്‌സ്‌സൈസ് അക്കാദമി ആൻഡ് റിസേർച് സെന്റർ, കേരള

Agency overview
- Formed: 2008
- Jurisdiction: State of Kerala
- Headquarters: Thrissur
- Ministers responsible: V. D. Satheesan, Chief Minister of Kerala; M. Liju, Excise Minister
- Agency executive: M. Sugunan (Joint Excise Commissioner, Director State Excise Academy & Research Centre, Thrissur)

Footnotes
- Honour - Duty - Service

State Excise Academy & Research Centre (SEARC) is situated in Poothole in Thrissur city, Kerala, India. The academy trains the entire staff of the Kerala Excise Department, and provides centralized training for Kerala State Excise personnel. It also runs basic training and in-service courses for various ranks. Earlier, the excise staff used to train at the Kerala Police Academy in Ramavarmapuram.
