= Police Dog Training Centre =

Police facility in Thrissur, Kerala, India

Police Dog Training Center is situated in Kerala Police Academy, in Thrissur city of Kerala state in India. It is one of the dog training centre in South India. It was established on 24 January 2008. The academy trains dogs for Kerala Police. The dog training centre can accommodate 30 dogs at a time and they can be trained in both tracking and sniffing operations. The first batch of dogs was passed out in October 2008.
