= Jos Theatre =

First permanent movie theatre in Kerala

Coordinates: 10.522379°N 76.215527°E

Jose Theater
- Jose Electrical Bioscope
- Interactive map of Jose Theater
- Address: Swaraj Round, Thrissur; Thrissur; India
- Owner: Jose Kattookkaran

Construction
- Opened: 1930

Jos Theatre is the first permanent movie theatre in Kerala, India. Located in Swaraj Round in Thrissur city, it was built by Kattukkaran Varunny Joseph, the first man to screen the film in Kerala. The movie theatre was earlier known as Jose Electrical Bioscope. It was Kerala's first permanent brick‑and‑mortar cinema hall and remains in continuous operation under the ownership of its founder's descendants.

== History ==
Kattukkaran Varunny Joseph was known as the "Father of Malayalam Cinema Exhibitors". He was the first to introduced film projection to Kerala in 1913 with his battery‑powered "Jose Electrical Bioscope" at Ollur, Thrissur. Building on that pioneering venture, he established Jose Theatre on Thrissur's Swaraj Round in 1930. It was the state's first permanent brick‑and‑mortar cinema hall. It is being operated by Joseph's descendants, the theater weathered the transition from silent films to talkies, multiple ownership changes and successive renovations continuously screening regional and national releases for over nine decades.

== Significance ==
As Kerala's first dedicated movie house, Jose Theatre institutionalized regular film exhibition, transforming cinema from a transient novelty into a form of public entertainment in Thrissur. It provided Malayalam filmmakers with an exhibition platform and fostered communal viewing traditions. Today, Jose Theatre is a monument to early Indian cinema's exhibition history and to the entrepreneurial work of its founder, whose touring bioscopes and permanent hall laid the groundwork for Kerala's cinematic development.
