= Thrissur =

City in Kerala, India

Thrissur Tṛśśūr (Malayalam) Trichur, Thrissivaperur
- Metropolis
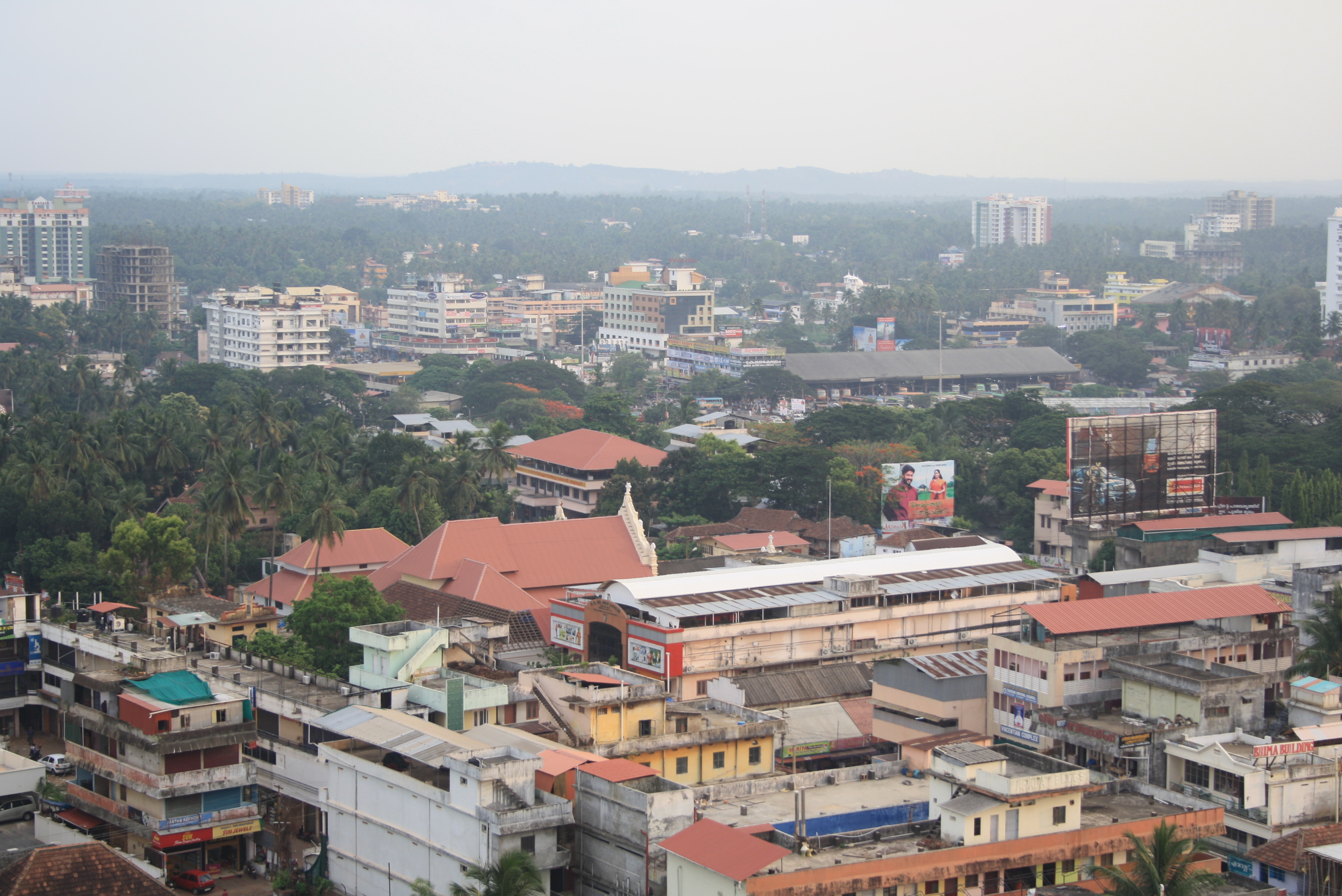
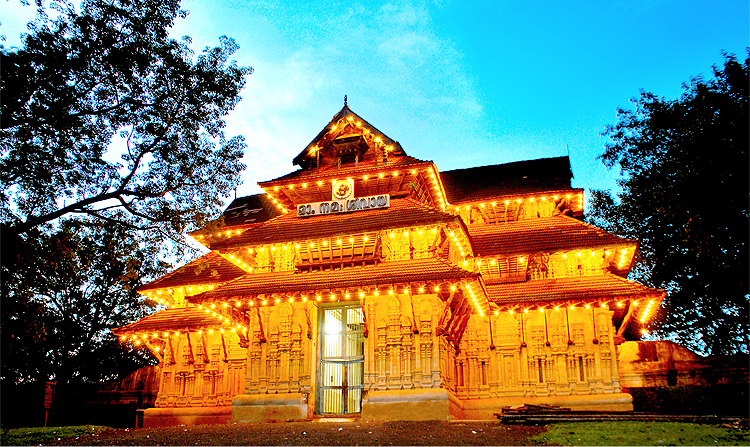
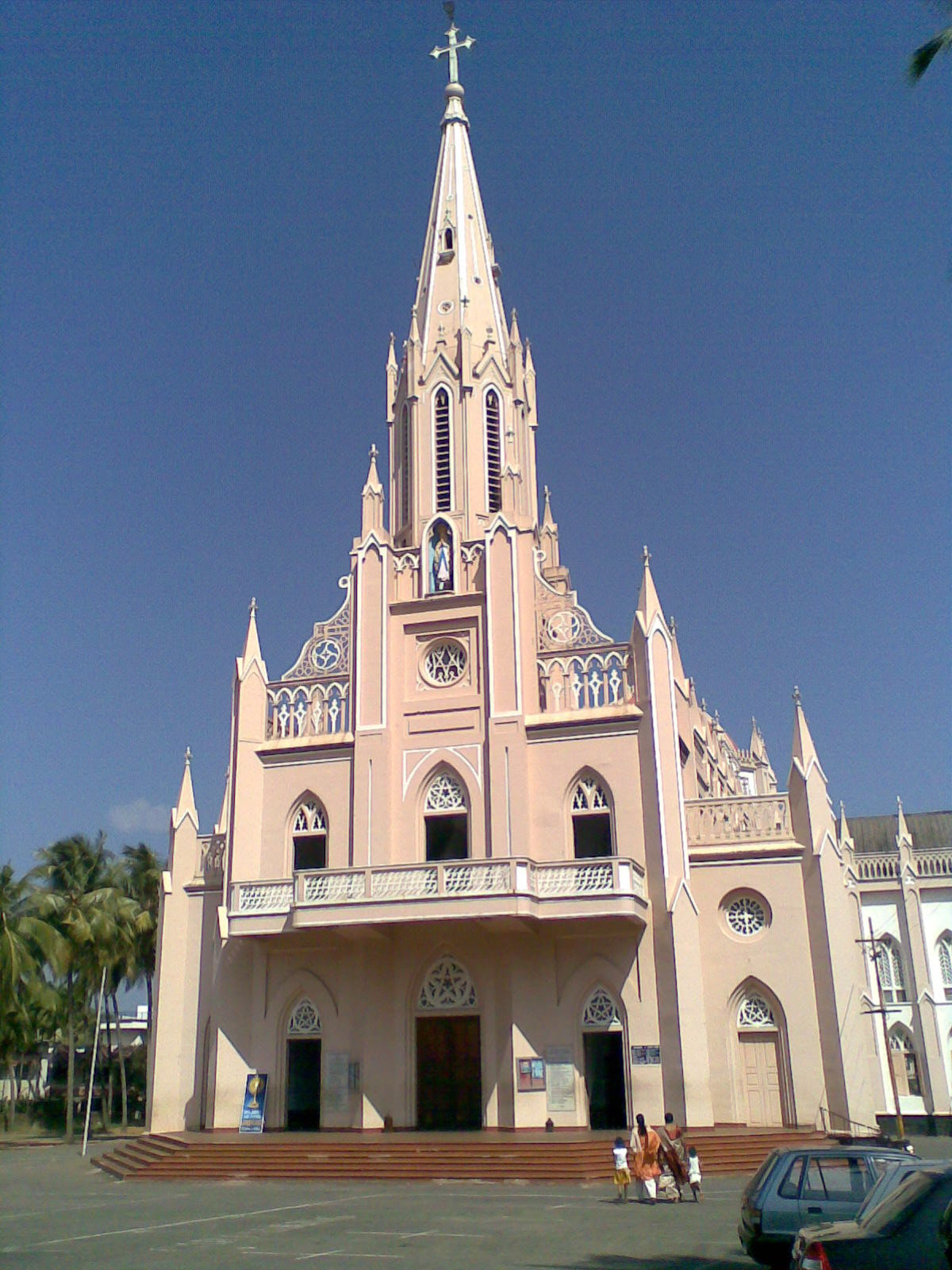
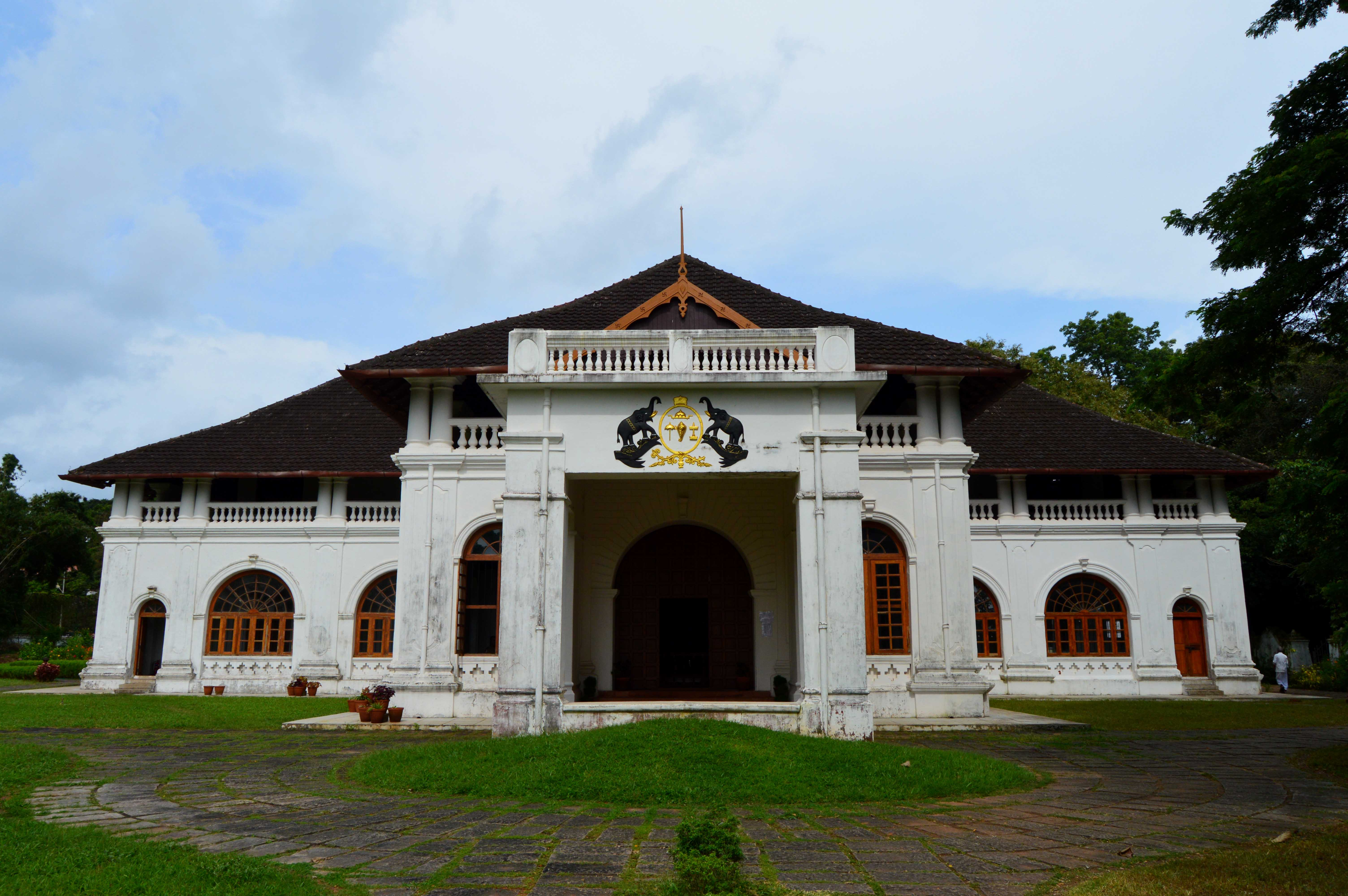
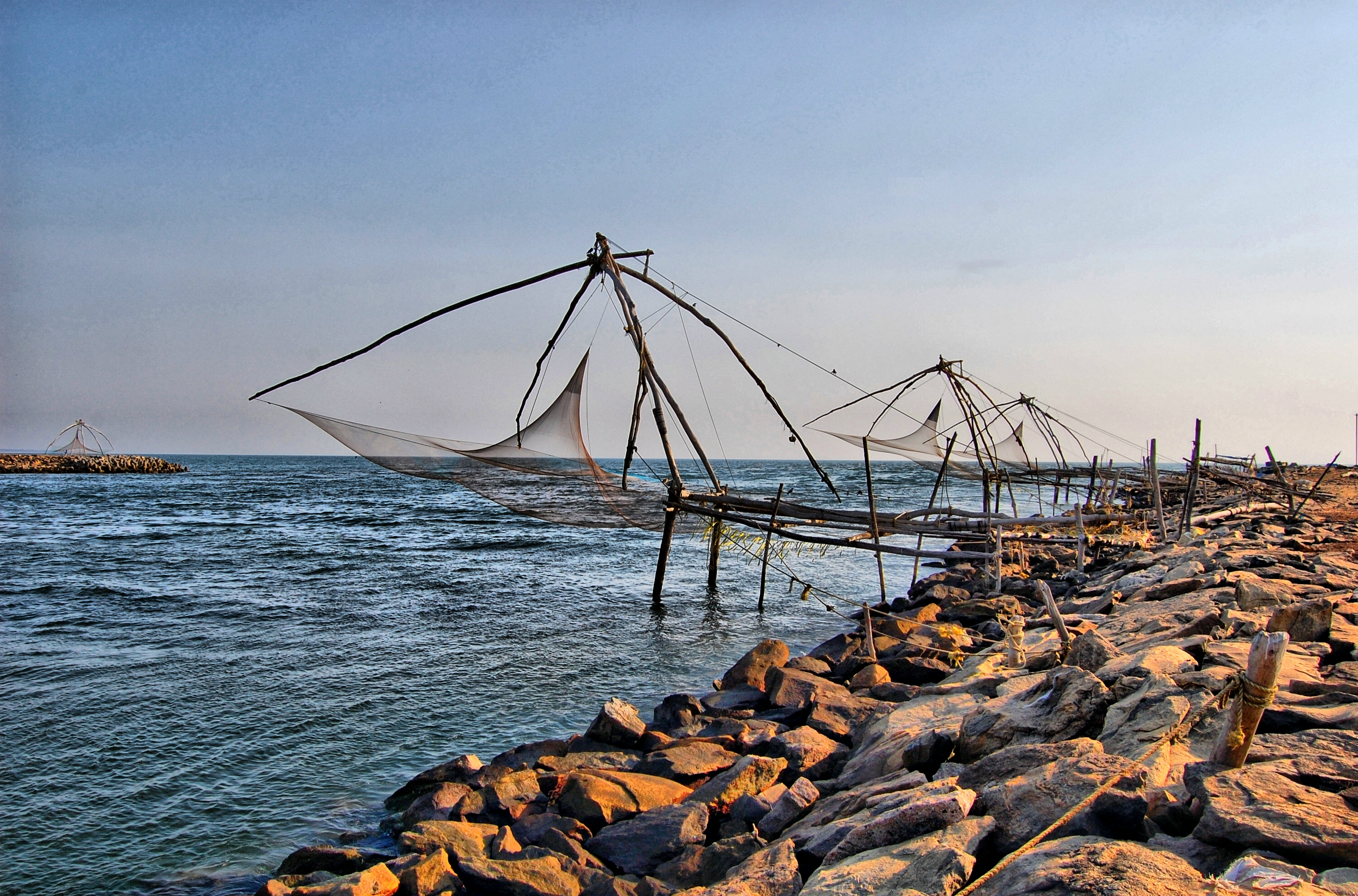
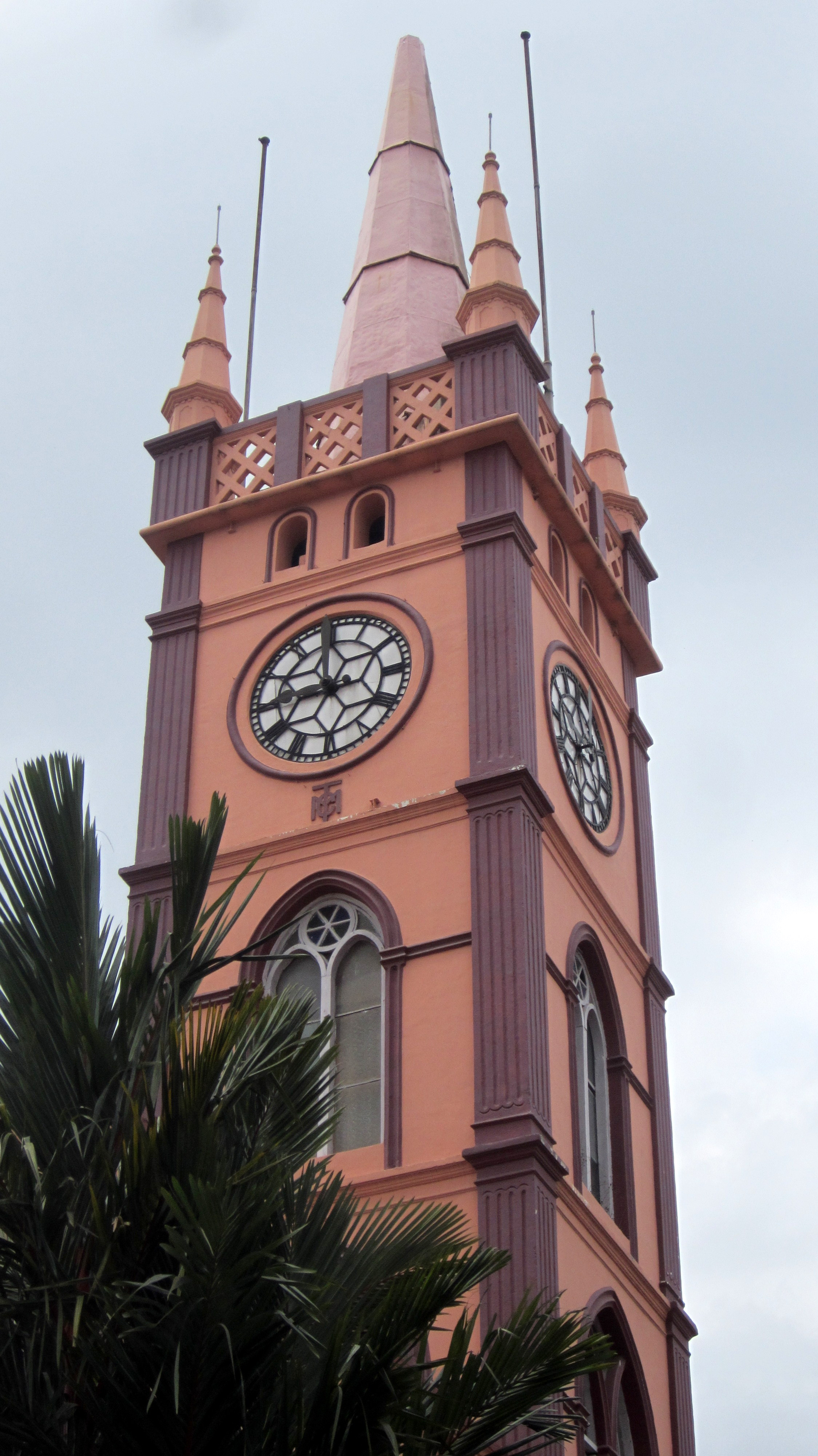
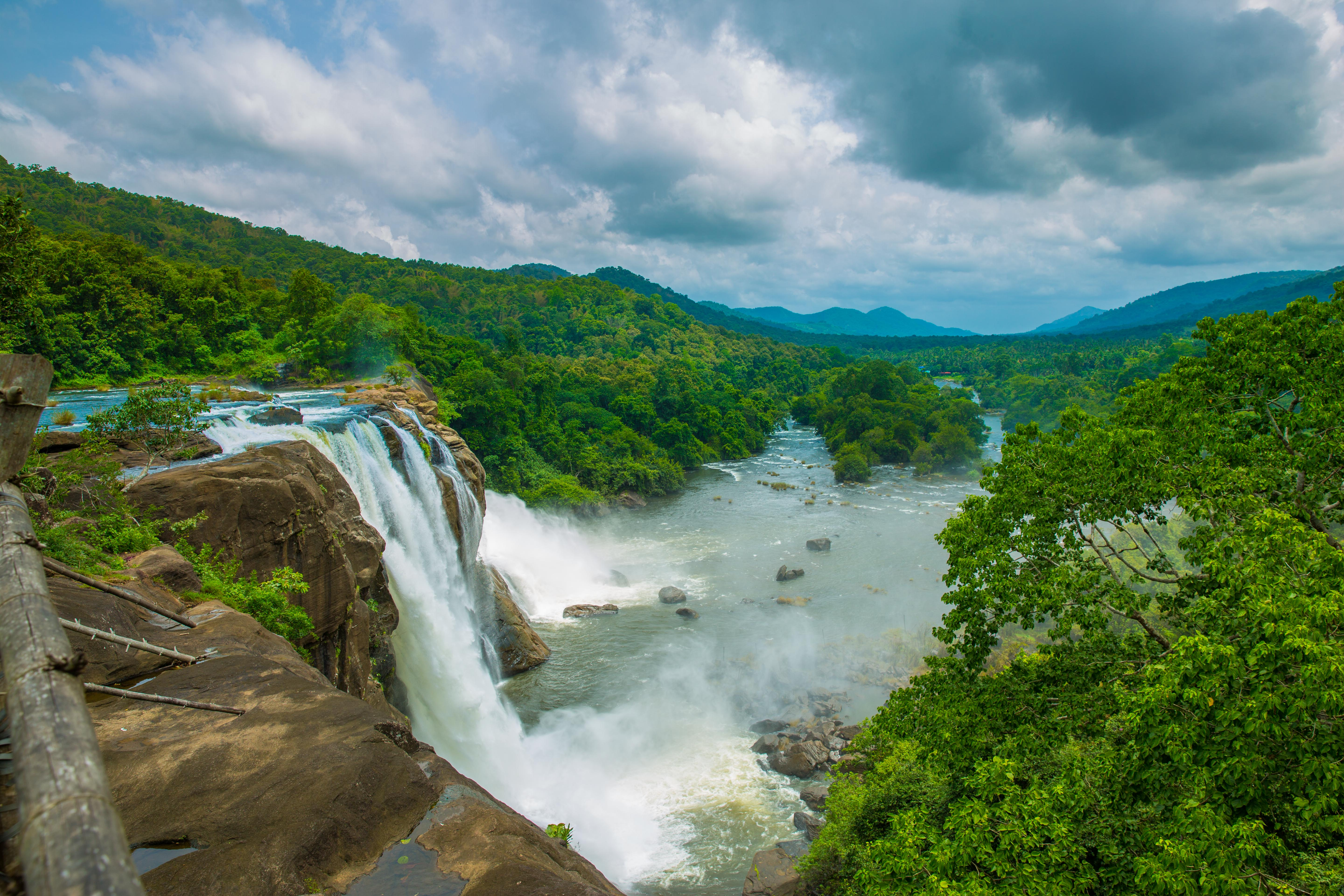
- Clockwise from top: Thrissur city, Metharapolitha Cathedral, Cape of Kodungallur, Athirappilly Falls, Municipal Corporation Building, Thrissur clock tower, Sakthan Thampuran Palace, Vadakkunnathan Temple

- Thrissur (Kerala) Thrissur (India)
- Coordinates: 10°31′39.4″N 76°12′51.8″E
- Country: India
- State: Kerala
- District: Thrissur

Government
  - Type: Municipal Corporation
  - Body: Thrissur Municipal Corporation
  - Mayor: Dr. Niji Justin (INC)
  - Deputy mayor: A Prasad (INC)
  - Police commissioner: Nakul Rajendra Deshmukh IPS
  - Member of Parliament: Suresh Gopi (BJP)
  - Member of Legislative Assembly: Rajan Pallan (INC)

Area
  - Metropolis: 101.42 km^{2} (39.16 sq mi)
  - Rank: 4th
- Elevation: 39.58 m (129.9 ft)

Population (2011)
  - Metropolis: 315,957
  - Density: 3,115/km^{2} (8,070/sq mi)
  - Metro: 3,720,000
- Demonym(s): Thrissurkaran (male); Thrissurkari (female); Thrissurkar (plural)

Languages
  - Official: Malayalam, English
- Time zone: UTC+5:30 (IST)
- PIN: 680xxx
- Telephone codes: Thrissur: +91487xxxxxxx, Irinjalakuda: +91480xxxxxxx, Wadakkancherry: +914884xxxxxx, Kunnamkulam: +914885xxxxxx
- Vehicle registration: KL-08
- Literacy rate: 97.24%
- GDP(2024): $13.6 Billion
- Importance: Cultural capital of Kerala
- Climate: Am/Aw (Köppen)
- Precipitation: 3,100 millimetres (120 in)
- Avg. summer temperature: 35 °C (95 °F)
- Avg. winter temperature: 20 °C (68 °F)
- Website: thrissur.nic.in

Thrissur (Malayalam: തൃശൂർ, pronounced [triˈʃ(ː)uːr]), formerly Trichur, also known by its historical name Thrissivaperur (Thiru-siva-perur), is a city and the headquarters of the Thrissur district in Kerala, India. It is the third largest urban agglomeration in Kerala after Kochi and Kozhikode, and the 21st largest in India. Thrissur is classified as a Tier-2 city by the Government of India. The city is built around a 65-acre (26 ha) hillock called Thekkinkadu Maidanam which seats the Vadakkumnathan temple. It is located 284 kilometres (176 mi) north-west of the state's capital city, Thiruvananthapuram. Thrissur was once the capital of the Kingdom of Cochin, and was a point of contact for the Assyrians, Greeks, Persians, Arabs, Romans, Portuguese, Dutch and English.

Thrissur is known as City of Celebrations and also called the cultural capital of Kerala because of its cultural, spiritual and religious leanings throughout history. The city centre contains the Kerala Sangeetha Nadaka Academy, Kerala Lalithakala Akademi and Kerala Sahitya Academy. The city hosts the Thrissur Pooram, one of the largest temple festival in the state. The festival is held at the Thekkinkadu Maidan of Vadakumnathan temple in April or May in the Malayalam month 'medam'.

The city has historically been a centre of Hindu scholarship, and Christianity, Islam and Judaism are believed to have entered the Indian subcontinent through Thrissur and its surrounding areas. Thrissur has a large number of well-known temples including the Vadakkumnathan temple, Thiruvambadi Sri Krishna Temple, and Paramekkavu Bagavathi temple. There are three major Catholic churches, the St. Antony's Syro-Malabar Catholic Forane, Our Lady of Lourdes Syro-Malabar Catholic Metropolitan Cathedral and Our Lady of Dolours Syro-Malabar Catholic Basilica, the largest Christian church in India. Thrissur is home to the Academy of Sharia and Advanced Studies an Islamic institute that is unusual in that it teaches Sanskrit and aspart of the Sanskrit syllabus it includes study of several key Hindu texts.

The city is the headquarters of four major scheduled banks, South Indian Bank Ltd, CSB Bank, Dhanalakshmi Bank and ESAF Small Finance Bank as well as several chit funds. The city is also known for its silks and gold jewellery industry.

Thrissur is also a major academic hub and is home to several educational institutions, including the Kerala Kalamandalam, Kerala Agricultural University, Kerala University of Health Sciences, College of Veterinary and Animal Sciences, Sree Kerala Varma College, St Thomas College, Jawahar Bal Bhavan Thrissur, Kerala Institute of Local Administration, Kerala Forest Research Institute, Kerala Police Academy, Police Dog Training Centre, Kerala Fire and Rescue Services Academy, Excise Academy and Research Centre, Government College Of Music And Performing Arts, Government College of Fine Arts, Government Law College, Government Engineering College, Government Medical College and Vaidyaratnam Ayurveda College. UNESCO has included Thrissur in its Global Network of Learning Cities (GNLC) in recognition of the city's outstanding efforts to make lifelong learning a reality for all at the local level.

== Etymology ==
The name Thrissur (Malayalam: തൃശ്ശൂർ) is a shortened form of the Malayalam word Thirusshivaperoor (meaning: City of the Sacred Lord Shiva). The name owes itself to the most prominent feature of the city, which is the Vadakkumnathan Temple, which has Shiva as its presiding deity. Thrissur was officially known by its anglicized name Trichur until 1990 when the government decided to replace it with its real Malayalam name. Thrissur was also known as "Vrishabhadripuram" (Kailasam of the South) in ancient days.

== History ==
The presence of numerous prehistoric megaliths and dolmens indicates that Thrissur has been inhabited from at least 1000 BCE to 500 CE.

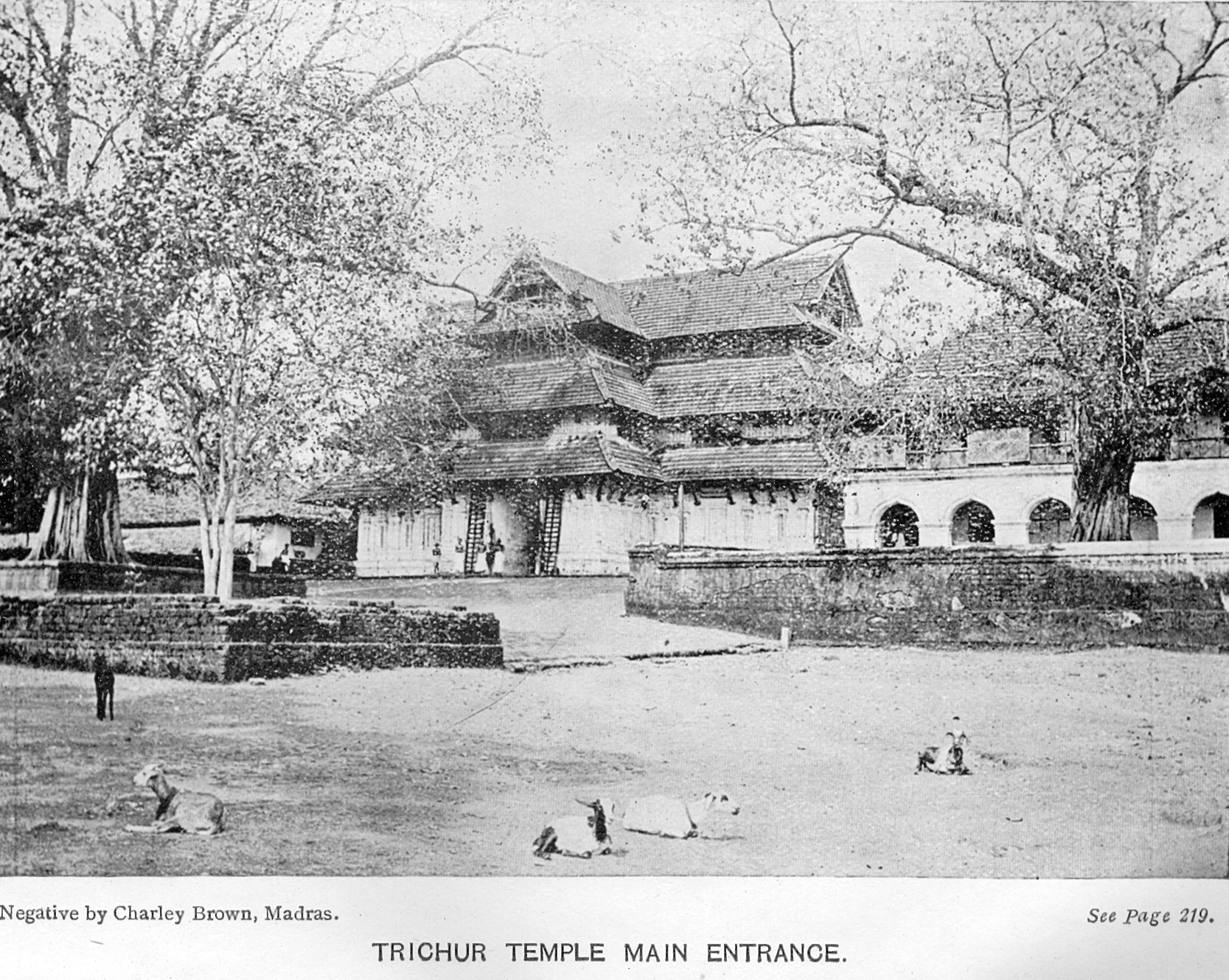
Image of the main entrance of Vadakkunnathan Temple seen from Swaraj Round from Illustrated Guide to the South Indian Railway

The Portuguese had naval influence in many parts of Kerala in the 16th century, including Thrissur. At the beginning of the 17th century, the Portuguese naval power was reduced and Dutch became the main naval power. With the help of the Dutch, the royal family of the Kingdom of Cochin recaptured Thrissur from the Zamorin of Calicut in 1710.

Thrissur rose to importance after Maharaja Sakthan Thampuran ascended the throne of the Kingdom of Cochin (1769–1805) and made Thrissur his capital. The Maharaja made the city into a major financial and commercial hub of South India, by inviting Syrian Christian families and Brahmins from adjoining areas.

During 1750–60 Hyder Ali, the Sultan of the powerful Kingdom of Mysore, conquered Thrissur, making it a tributary of Mysore. In 1786, the son of Tipu Sultan of Mysore led another invasion of Thrissur but retreated after the Srirangapattanam war. In the meantime, Rama Varma X, the successor of Sakthan Thampuran signed a treaty with the East India Company, transforming the state of Cochin into a British Protectorate.

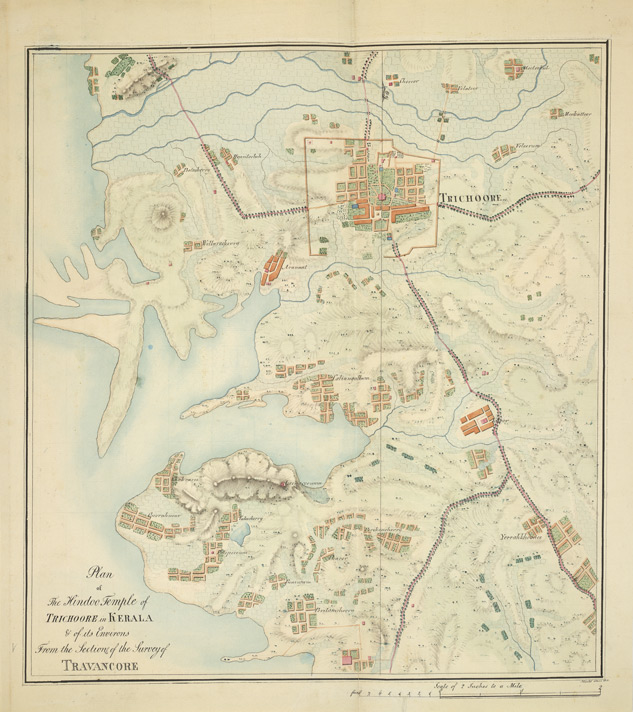
The first known map of Thrissur City with Vadakkunnathan Temple prepared by John Gould in 1816

The Indian independence movement gained momentum after a Committee was formed at the 1919 meeting of the Indian National Congress. The civil disobedience movement attracted many people in Thrissur in subsequent years, and Mahatma Gandhi visited the city in 1927 and 1934 to promote it.

R. K. Shanmukham Chetty, the controversial Diwan of Cochin Kingdom from 1935 to 1941, developed the city by constructing Thrissur Town Hall and Ramanilayam, buildings which remain important in Kerala politics. Other important civic buildings and infrastructure constructed around this time include the Municipal Corporation Building of Thrissur and the Swaraj Round.

In 1947, when India gained independence from colonial rule, Thrissur was part of the Kingdom of Cochin. Thrissur district was formed on 1 July 1949, with the headquarters at the city of Thrissur.

== Geography ==
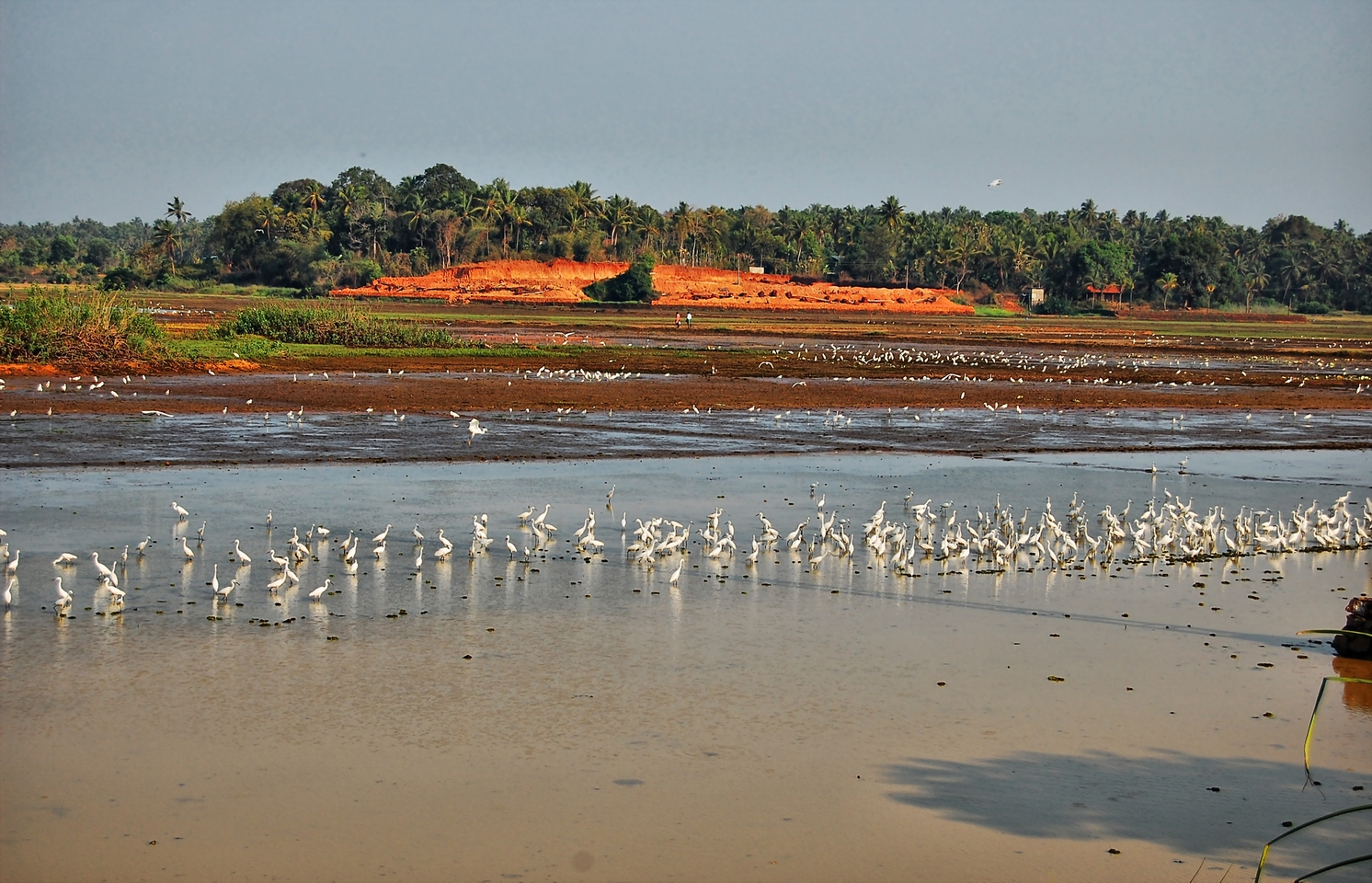
The Thrissur-Ponnani Kole Wetlands is one of largest, highly productive and threatened wetlands in Kerala. It acts as natural drainage for City of Thrissur.

Thrissur is the headquarters of Thrissur district, in the center of the Indian state of Kerala. The city is 75 km north-east of Kochi, 133 km south-west of Coimbatore, 124 km south-east of Kozhikode and 151 km north of Changanacherry. The city is located in a hillock called Thekkinkadu Maidan which is the second highest point in the city after the Vilangan Hills. The city has an average altitude of 2.83 meters above sea level.

From the hillock, the city gradually flattens into the Thrissur-Ponnani Kole Wetlands, which act as natural drainage for the city. The water from the wetlands flows via rivers into the Laccadive Sea, keeping Thrissur city safe from the major flooding that affects most other cities in Kerala.

The city is located in the midland region of Kerala, with an extended part of the Palakkad plains. The city geologically is composed of Archaean gneisses and crystalline schists. Major parts of the city are covered by Archaean rocks. The city lies near the center of the Indian tectonic plate (the Indian Plate) and is subject to comparatively little seismic or volcanic activity.

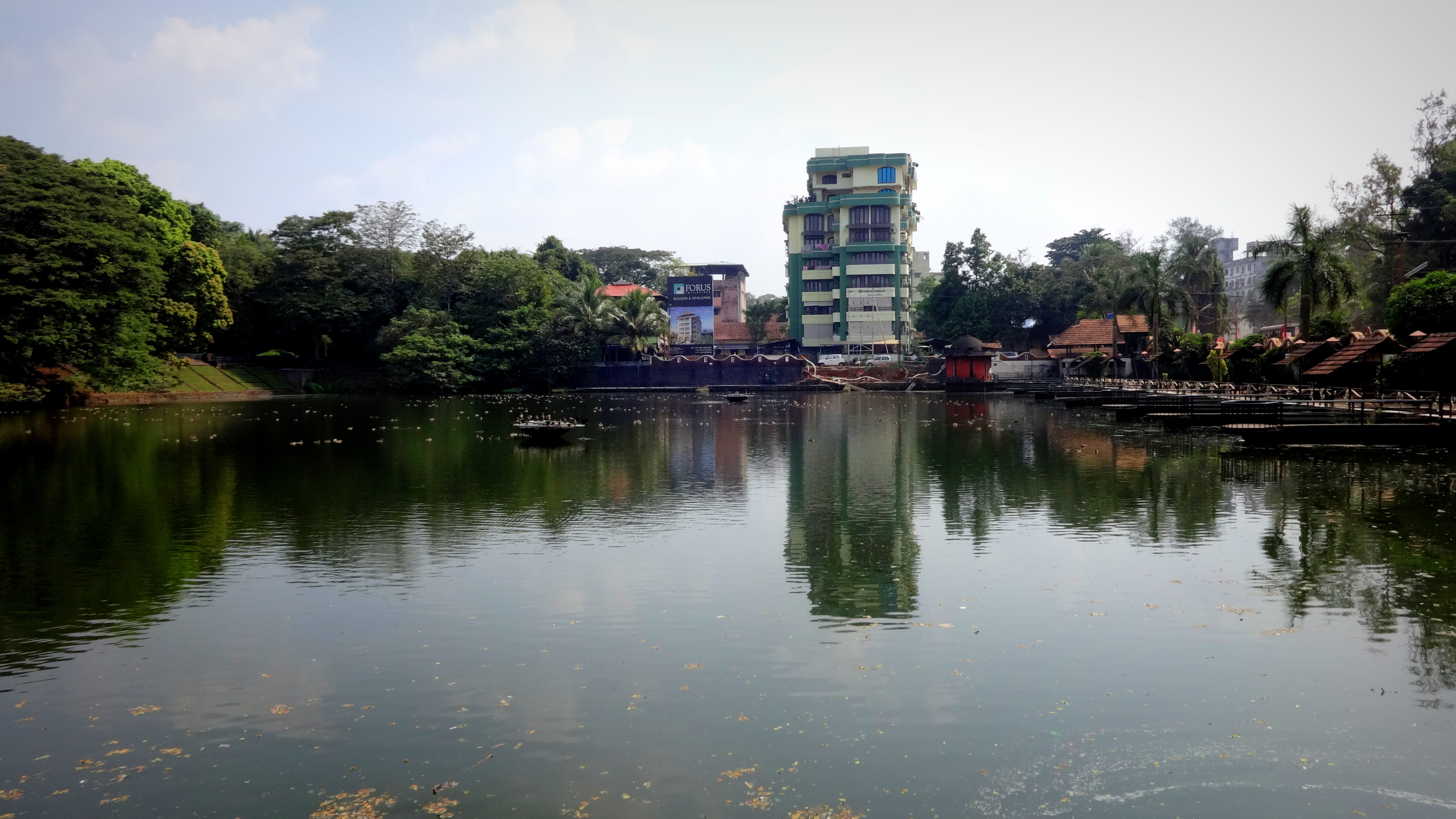
Ponds and canals in Vadakkechira, Thrissur prevent flooding during monsoon season.

=== Climate ===
Under the Köppen climate classification, the City of Thrissur features a tropical monsoon climate (Am). Summer lasts from March to May which is the hottest time of the year. Summer months are uncomfortable due to higher levels of heat and humidity. Daytime temperatures can rise up to 36 to 38 °C (96.8 to 100.4 °F) coupled with excessive humidity. Summer is followed by the southwest monsoon from June to September. October and November form the post-monsoon or retreating monsoon season. Winter from December through February is cooler, and windy, due to winds from the Western Ghats. Winter months are generally dry and less humid compared to other months of the year. Morning temperatures are usually cool and daytime temperatures hover around 30 °C or 86 °F.

The city is drenched in the monsoonal season by heavy showers. The average annual rainfall is approximately 3,100 millimetres or 122 inches. The South-west monsoon generally sets in during the last week of May. After July the rainfall decreases. On average, there are 124 rainy days in a year. The maximum average temperature of the city in the summer season is 36 °C or 96.8 °F while the minimum temperature recorded is 27 °C or 80.6 °F. The winter season records a maximum average of 31 °C or 87.8 °F and a minimum average of 20 °C or 68 °F.

Climate data for Thrissur (Vellanikkara) 1991–2020
Month	Jan	Feb	Mar	Apr	May	Jun	Jul	Aug	Sep	Oct	Nov	Dec	Year
Record high °C (°F)	35.9 (96.6)	39.7 (103.5)	40.4 (104.7)	39.9 (103.8)	38.3 (100.9)	36.2 (97.2)	33.0 (91.4)	33.3 (91.9)	35.3 (95.5)	35.4 (95.7)	34.9 (94.8)	35.5 (95.9)	40.4 (104.7)
Mean daily maximum °C (°F)	33.1 (91.6)	34.8 (94.6)	35.7 (96.3)	34.9 (94.8)	33.3 (91.9)	30.2 (86.4)	29.5 (85.1)	29.8 (85.6)	30.6 (87.1)	31.5 (88.7)	32.0 (89.6)	32.0 (89.6)	32.2 (90.0)
Mean daily minimum °C (°F)	22.2 (72.0)	22.7 (72.9)	24.4 (75.9)	25.1 (77.2)	24.7 (76.5)	23.6 (74.5)	23.0 (73.4)	23.1 (73.6)	23.0 (73.4)	22.9 (73.2)	22.9 (73.2)	22.5 (72.5)	23.3 (73.9)
Record low °C (°F)	16.5 (61.7)	16.9 (62.4)	18.9 (66.0)	19.9 (67.8)	20.2 (68.4)	19.6 (67.3)	18.5 (65.3)	19.6 (67.3)	20.3 (68.5)	18.0 (64.4)	16.9 (62.4)	16.6 (61.9)	16.5 (61.7)
Average rainfall mm (inches)	0.4 (0.02)	19.0 (0.75)	27.8 (1.09)	60.1 (2.37)	214.3 (8.44)	615.8 (24.24)	596.6 (23.49)	484.4 (19.07)	320.6 (12.62)	289.7 (11.41)	95.9 (3.78)	8.4 (0.33)	2,732.9 (107.59)
Average rainy days	0.1	0.7	1.7	3.8	8.3	22.0	23.6	18.3	13.8	12.0	4.8	0.8	109.9
Average relative humidity (%) (at 17:30 IST)	46	47	59	66	71	82	82	80	78	77	70	57	68
Source: India Meteorological Department

== Economy ==
Thrissur is home to many Malayali entrepreneurs and is a major financial and commercial hub of Kerala. Historians say that King Sakthan Thampuran invited Syrian Christian families and Brahmins to settle in Thrissur city from their business centers in adjoining areas. Soon, Thrissur became a flourishing centre of internal trade in Kerala. Thrissur is one of the major manufacturing centers of plain gold and rolled gold jewellery in South India; up to 70% of Kerala's jewellery is manufactured in Thrissur. There are around 3,000 gold ornaments manufacturing units in the city and 40,000-odd artisans and others work in these units. The industry provides direct and indirect employment to 200,000 people in Thrissur. The artisans based in these units craft nearly 85 percent of one tonne gold which is used per day in Kerala. About 90 tonnes of gold was being used annually in Kerala for manufacturing of ornaments daily.

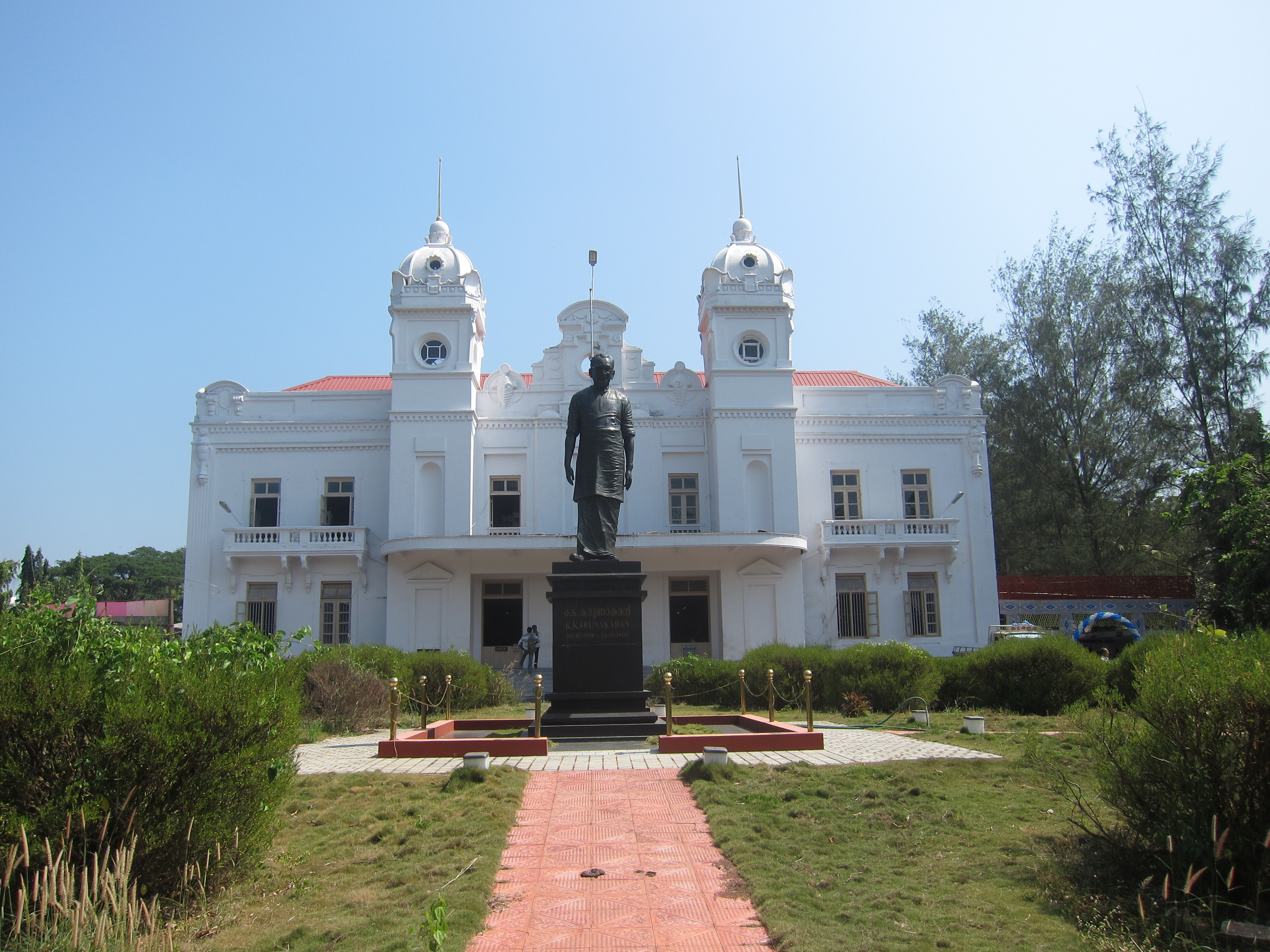
The Town Hall in Thrissur

According to the Reserve Bank of India, Thrissur has been regarded as a banking town since the 1930s, when 58 banks were headquartered in the city. In the present, the city remains a significant center for banking and finance, with the headquarters of major banks like South Indian Bank, CSB Bank, Dhanlaxmi Bank, and other financial institutions like Manappuram Finance, Kerala State Financial Enterprises and ESAF Small Finance Bank. Many chit funds, a type of Indian savings and credit system, are located in Thrissur. In 2010, an estimated 3,000 chit fund companies were located in Thrissur, employing approximately 35,000 people.

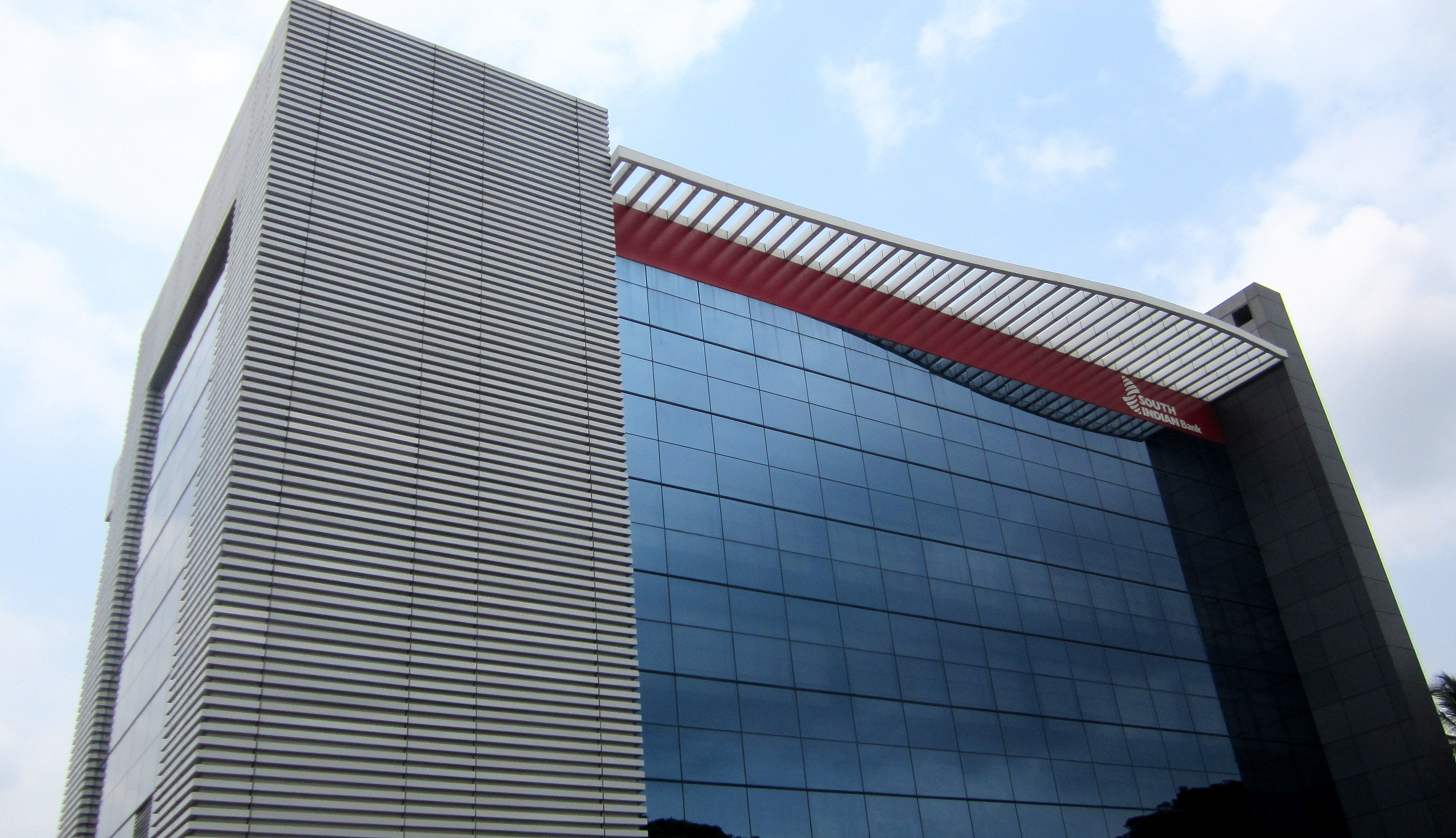
South Indian Bank headquarters in Thrissur City

The city is a hub for the Ayurvedic drug-manufacturing industry. Out of the 850 ayurvedic drug-manufacturing companies in Kerala, about 150, including some of the largest in the state like Oushadhi, Vaidyaratnam Oushadhasala, KP Namboodiris, are located in and around the city. Thrissur Ayurveda Cluster, another initiative by a group of Ayurvedic manufacturers of Thrissur, has developed a cluster in KINFRA Park in Koratty in Thrissur District.

Retail businesses in Thrissur include Kalyan Group, Jos Alukkas, Joy Alukkas and Josco Group. InfoPark Thrissur, the fourth technology park in Kerala, is situated in Thrissur District. Tourism has also contributed heavily to the economy of Thrissur. Domestic tourists generally use the city as a hub to explore the highly promoted tourism industry of the state of Kerala. The city with its temples, old churches and its culture, is ranked first in the number of domestic tourists visiting Kerala.

== Administration ==
Municipal Corporation Officials
Mayor	Dr Niji Justin
Deputy mayor	A. Prasad
Members of Legislative Assembly
Thrissur Assembly Constituency	Rajan Pallan
Ollur Assembly Constituency	K. Rajan
Member of Parliament (Lok Sabha)
Thrissur Lok Sabha constituency	Suresh Gopi

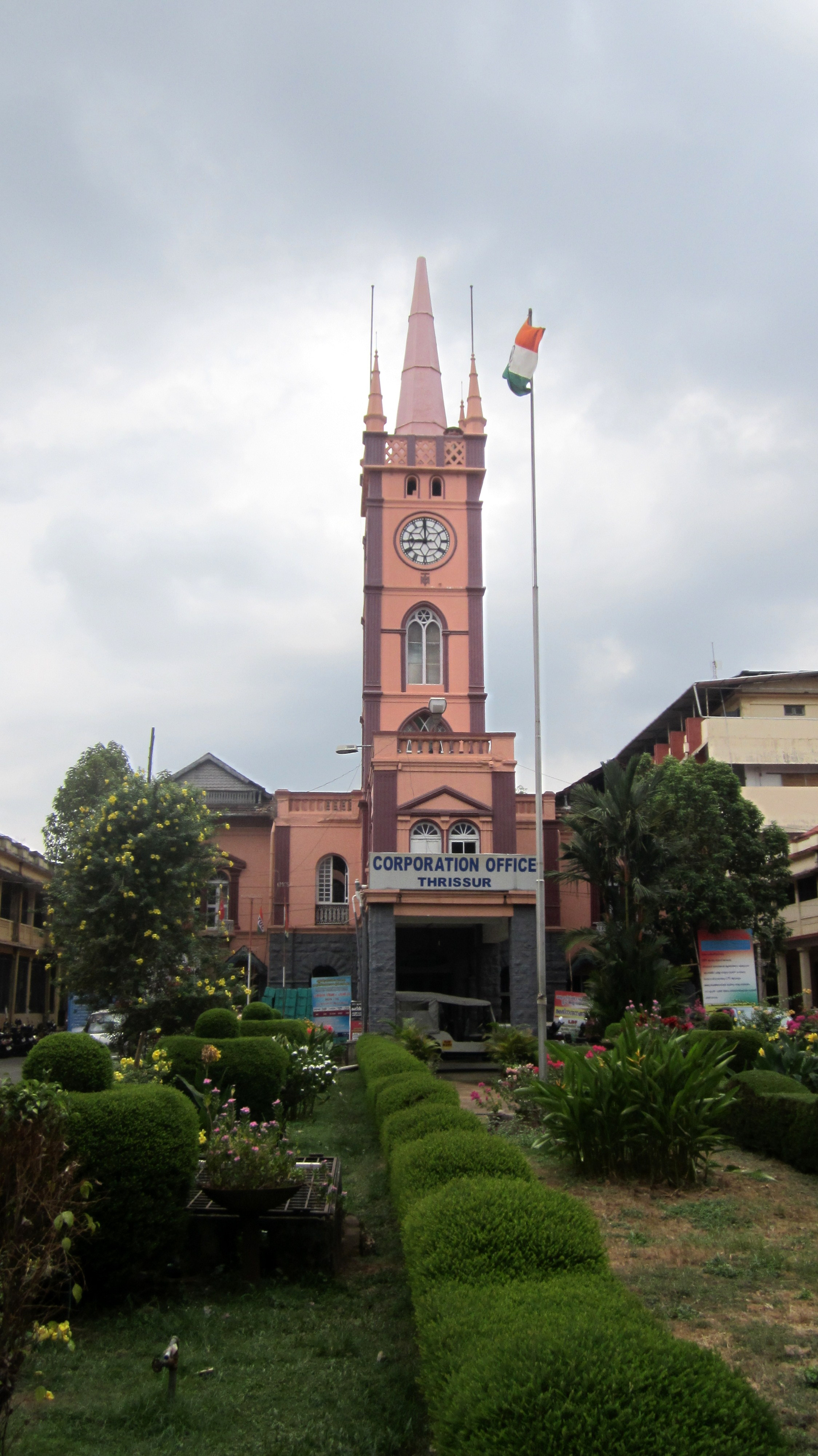
Municipal Corporation Building, Thrissur seen from M.O. Road

=== Municipal governance ===
Thrissur has functioned as a municipality since 1921 under the Cochin Municipal Regulations. In 1932, the new corporation building was constructed, and in 1972, several village councils or panchayats were added to the municipality. On 1 October 2000, the municipal town was upgraded to a municipal corporation and took over the towns and villages of Ayyanthole, Koorkkenchery, Nadathara, Vilvattom (part), Ollur and Ollukkara.

The city is administered by the Thrissur Municipal Corporation, headed by a mayor and comprising three legislative assemblies Thrissur, Ollur and Cherpu. For administrative purposes, the city is divided into 56 wards, from which the members of the corporation council are elected for five years.

It is the second-largest city corporation in the state of Kerala in India. The corporation, headquartered in the city of Thrissur proper, directly controls power, water supply and solid waste management system in the city. The Thrissur Municipal Corporation and Town and Country Planning Department (TCPD) are the agencies that prepare development plan for the city.

State agencies provide several essential public services in the city. The Kerala Water Authority provides water supply; the Kerala Fire and Rescue Services Department provides fire protection and emergency response; the Kerala Police is responsible for law enforcement and public safety; and the Kerala State Electricity Board provides electricity distribution. Public transport is operated mainly by the Kerala State Road Transport Corporation (KSRTC), along with private bus operators.

=== Police services ===
The Thrissur City Police is responsible for policing and law enforcement in the city. It operates under the Kerala Police and is headed by a Commissioner of Police (CP). The Thrissur City Police has jurisdiction over an area of 570.79 km², covering Thrissur city and the municipalities of Guruvayoor, Chelakkara, Wadakkanchery, Kunnamkulam and Chavakkad.

The city is divided into four sub divisions, Thrissur, Kunnamkulam, Ollur and Guruvayur. It also operates 24 police stations, including a woman police station, a cyber crime station and a traffic police station.The city is the headquarters of Thrissur City Police and Thrissur Rural Police.

The Thrissur City Police Commissionerate operates out of the erst-while District Armed Police headquarters at Ramavarmapuram. The Thrissur Rural Police has its headquarters at the District Collectorate complex at Ayyanthole. The city is also the headquarters of the Deputy Inspector General of Police, Thrissur Range, which looks after the law and order of Thrissur District, Palakkad District and Malappuram District. All the Superintendent of Police of these three districts come under his jurisdiction. The city also contains the Kerala Police Academy, Central Prison, Viyyur, Police Dog Training Centre and Excise Academy and Research Centre. Indian Reserve Battalion, the new commando unit of Kerala Police is headquartered in Ramavarmapuram. Border Security Force (148 battalion) have its first center in Kerala in Thrissur only.

== Demographics ==
Historical population
Year	Pop.	±%
1941	57,500	—
1951	69,500	+20.9%
1961	73,000	+5.0%
1971	76,200	+4.4%
1981	77,900	+2.2%
1991	74,600	−4.2%
2001	317,526	+325.6%
2011	315,957	−0.5%

Religions in Thrissur city (2011)
Religion	Percent
Hinduism	54.20%
Christianity	40.04%
Islam	5.50%
Other or not stated	0.26%

As of 2011 India census, Thrissur city had a population of 315,957. Males constitute 48.2% and females constitute 51.8% of the total population numbering 152,296 and 163,661 respectively. The density of population is 3,130/km^{2}. The sex ratio is 1,092/1,000 male. The total number of the households in the city is 66,827. The average family size in the city is 4.27 members. The city has a slum population equivalent to 0.30% of the total city population and 0.37% of the Kerala's slum population. The city has an average literacy rate of 95.96%: male literacy rate is 97.37% whereas female literacy rate is 94.72%.

Hindus constitute the majority with 54.20% of the population. Christians constitute 40.04% of the population,Dominated By Syro Malabar Church and is home to the Archeparchy of Trichur.Muslims constitute 5.50% of the population in Thrissur city. In Thrissur district Hindu population is 58.42% and Muslim population is 17.07% and Christian population is 24.27%.

Languages of Thrissur city (2011)
1. Malayalam (97.8%)
2. Tamil (1.35%)
3. Others (0.89%)

By language, 97.76% of the population speaks Malayalam and 1.35% Tamil as their first language.

== Politics ==
Thrissur has played a significant part in the political history of South India. Thrissur City administration is carried out by Municipal Corporation of Thrissur. Dr. Niji Justin (UDF) is the Mayor of Thrissur Municipal Corporation. The city of Thrissur is represented in the Kerala State Legislative Assembly by two elected members, one from Thrissur Assembly Constituency and another from Ollur Assembly Constituency. As of 2026, Rajan J. Pallan is the representative of Thrissur Assembly Constituency and K. Rajan from Ollur Assembly Constituency.

Thrissur city is also a part of the Thrissur Lok Sabha constituency and elects a member to the Lok Sabha, the lower house of the Parliament of India, once every five years. The current MP is Suresh Gopi of the Bharatiya Janata Party. The Lok Sabha seat has primarily been held by the Indian National Congress (seven terms since 1951) and the Communist Party of India (ten terms since 1957).

== Culture ==
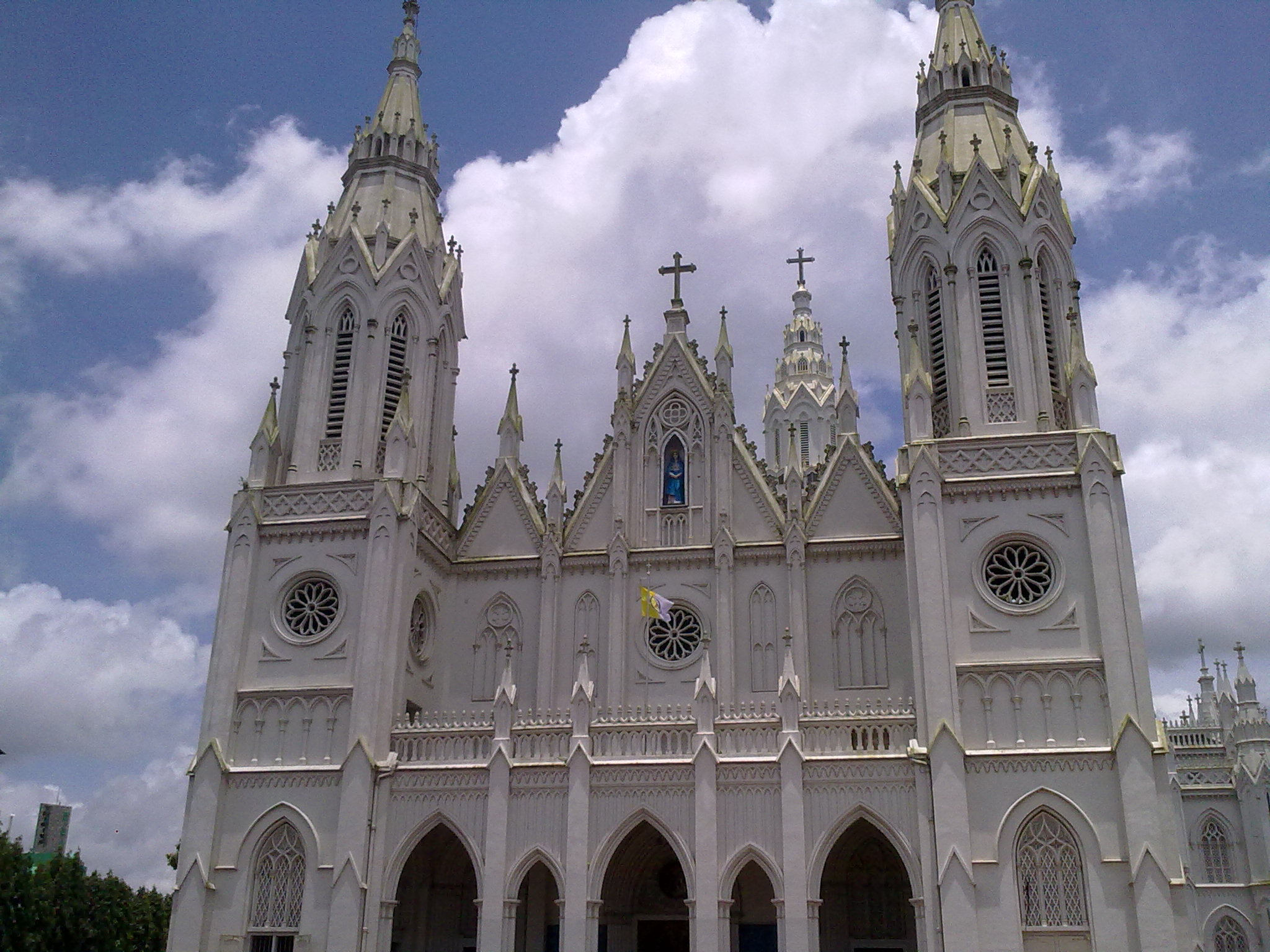
Asia's tallest church, the Our Lady of Dolours Syro-Malabar Catholic Basilica is situated in the middle of Thrissur city

=== Festivals ===
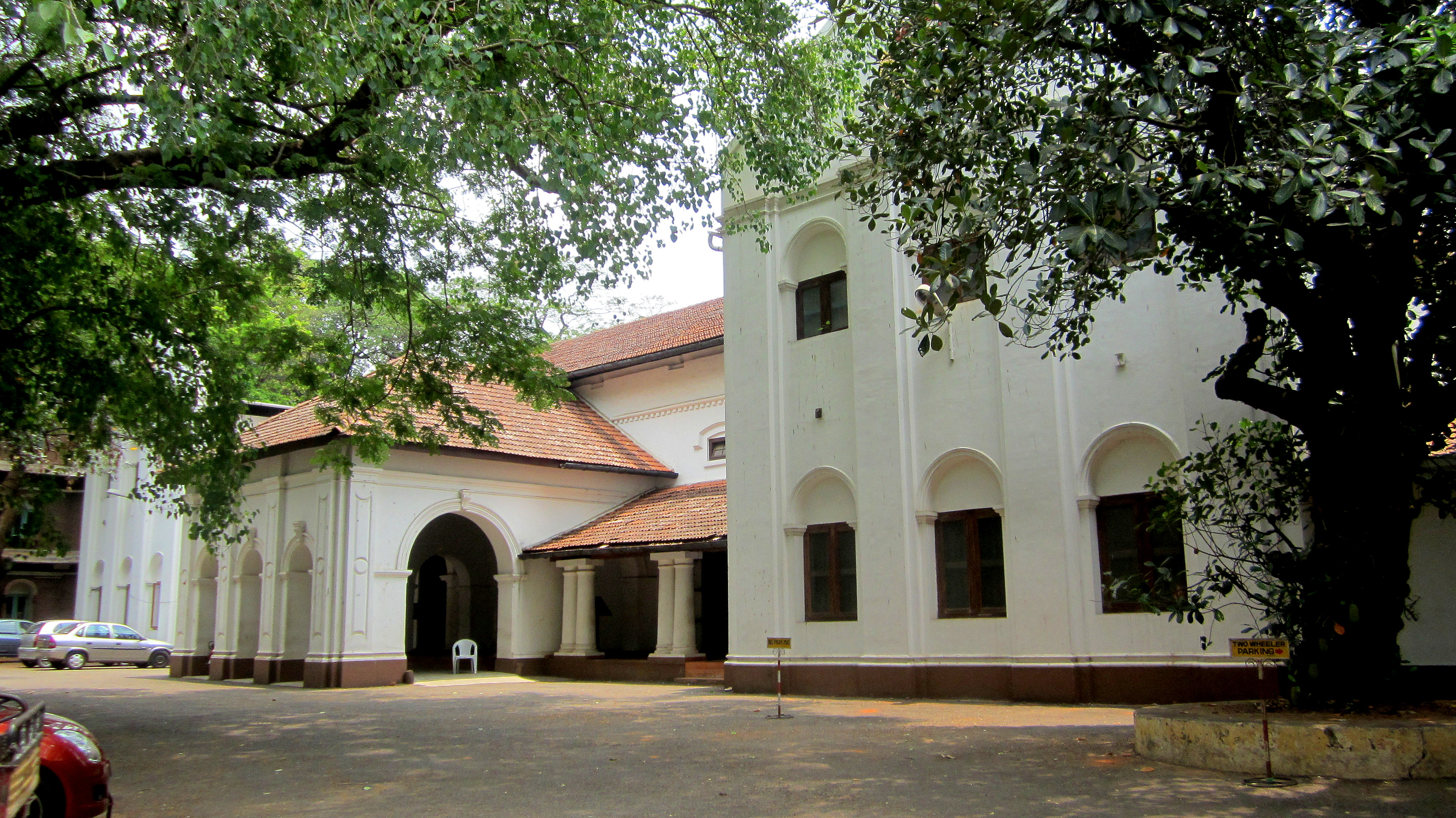
Kerala Sahitya Academy building in Thrissur

Thrissur is known as the Cultural Capital of Kerala, the city enjoys a thriving cultural tradition dating back to centuries. Thrissur Pooram, the largest pooram in Kerala, is sometimes referred to as 'the pooram of all poorams'. It is celebrated every year in the month of Medam (mid-April to mid-may) as per the Malayalam calendar. For thirty-six hours, the city plays host to a large gathering of people and elephants.

Puli Kali, also known as Kavakali, is another festival, which attracts thousands of people to the city. It is performed by trained artists to entertain people on the occasion of Onam, an annual harvest festival, celebrated mainly in Kerala. Buon Natale is the cultural festival conducted at Swaraj Round with Christmas celebration. Buon Natale procession entered the Guinness World Records in 2014 for having the most number of people dressed up as Santa Claus. Other important festivals celebrated in the city include Christmas, Onam, Diwali, Easter, Eid and Vishu.

Elephants play a major part in many of the city's festivals. Aanayoottu (feeding of elephants), held in Vadakkunnathan Temple in the City annually, is the world's largest elephant feeding ceremony. The ceremony is conducted on the first day of the Malayalam month of Karkidakam.

=== Literature ===
Literary lineage of city dates back to early history of Kerala but it came to prominence after Kerala Government set up Kerala Lalita Kala Akademi, Kerala Sahitya Academy, Kerala Sangeetha Nadaka Academy and College of Fine Arts, Thrissur for promoting literature, music and arts in Kerala. After the Indian Independence, Thrissur became the literary capital of Kerala as turned to the playground of novelist, poets and orators. In 1952 when Current Books set its first shop in Thrissur by former education Minister Professor Joseph Mundassery, it become the abode of writer's like O. V. Vijayan, Kovilan, V. K. N., Uroob, Edasseri Govindan Nair, M. T. Vasudevan Nair, K. G. Sankara Pillai and Sarah Joseph. The area was later known as Current Moola ("Current Corner"). The building that housed the Current Books bookshop was demolished in 2011.

Thrissur is home to prominent Malayalam literary figures like Kovilan, Kunhunni Mash, Sukumar Azhikode, K. Satchidanandan, Mullanezhi, Sarah Joseph, Attoor Ravi Varma, Lalitha Lenin, P. Bhaskaran, Joseph Mundassery.

=== Religious buildings ===
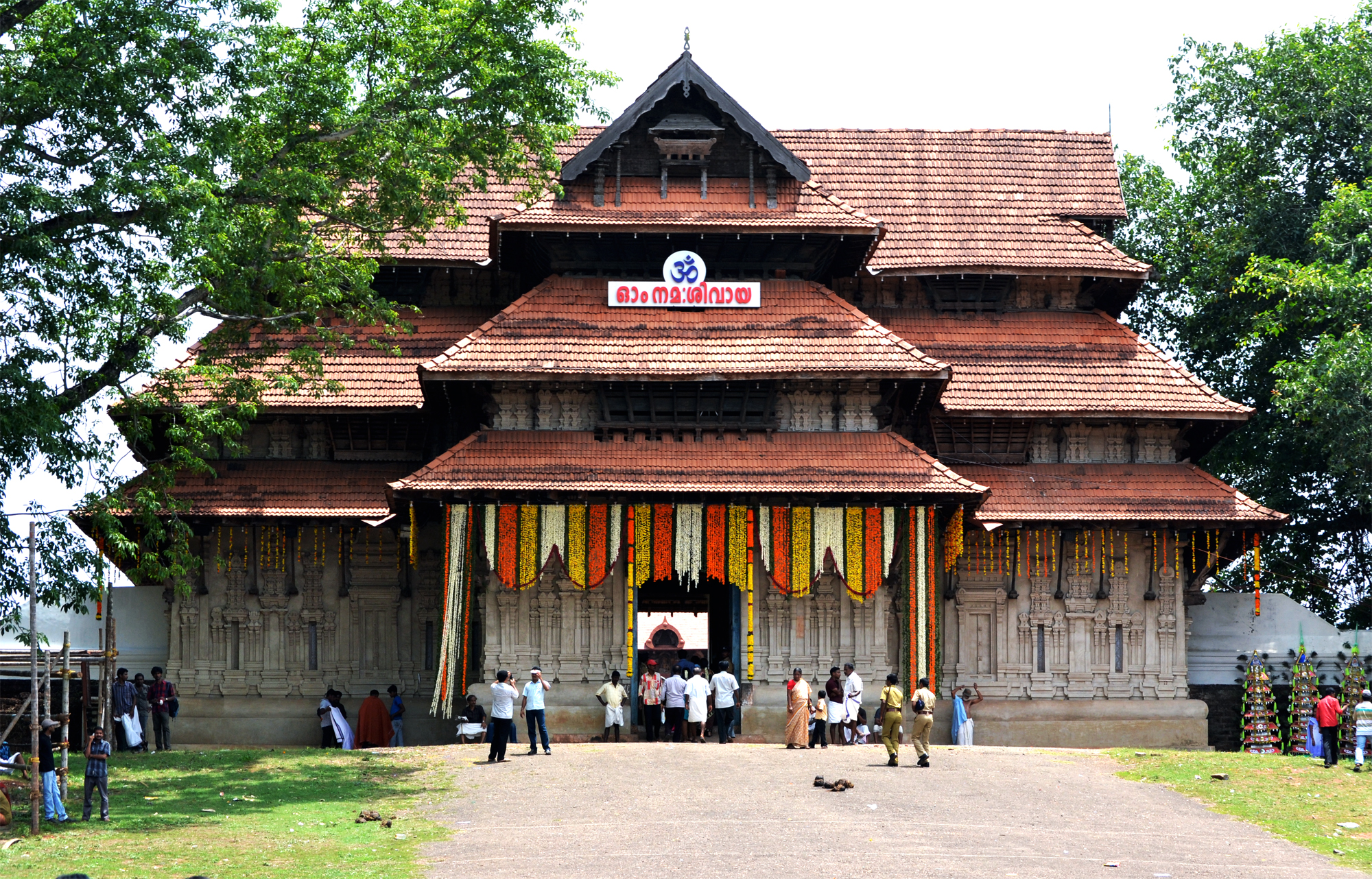
One of the four Vadakumnathan Temple Gates, inside the Swaraj Maidan

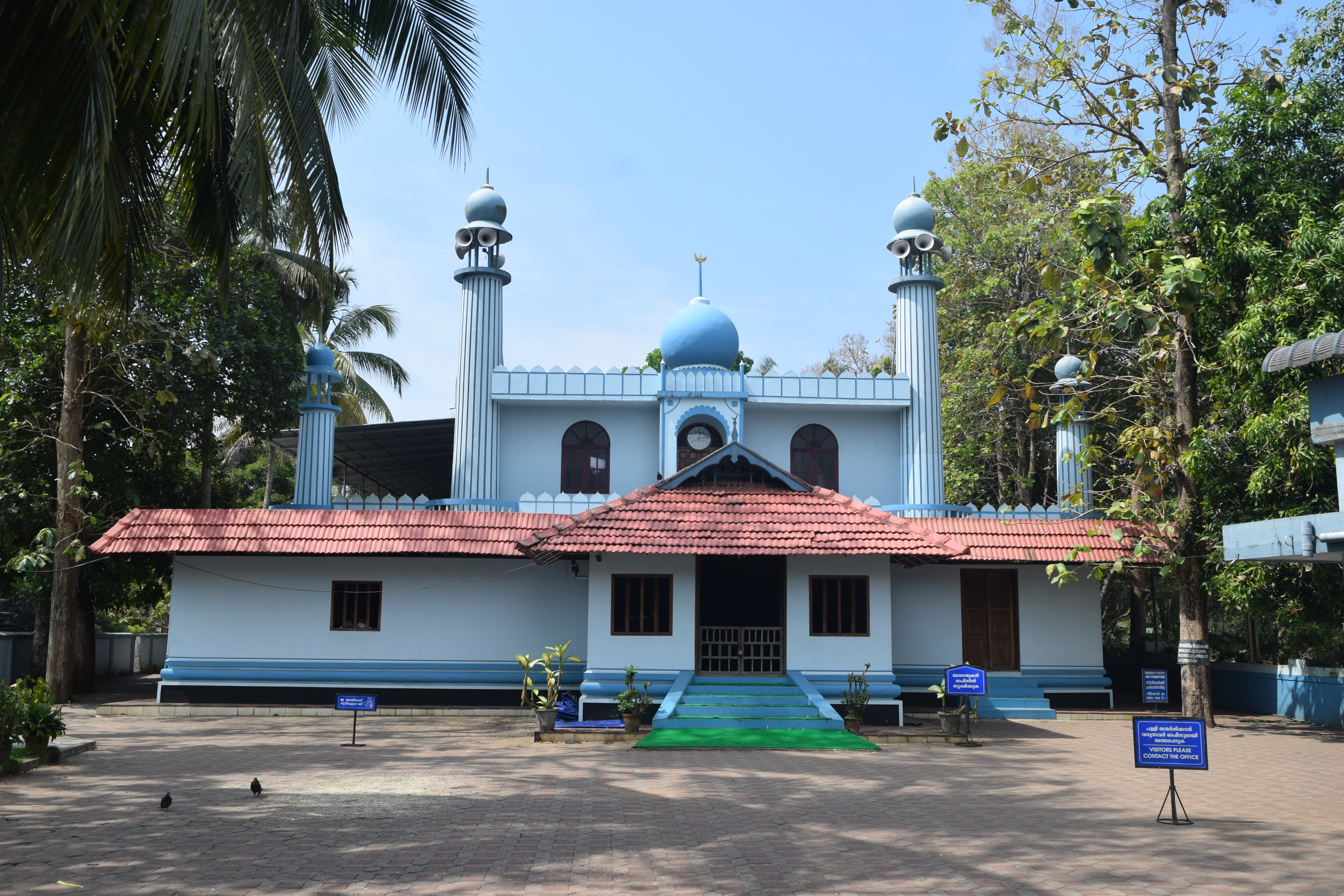
Cheraman Juma Mosque, said to be the oldest mosque in India

The Vadakkunnathan temple, believed to have been founded by the legendary saint Parasurama, is an example of the Kerala style of architecture and houses several sacred shrines and murals delineating graphically, various episodes from the Mahabharata. Thiruvambadi Sri Krishna Temple, one of the largest Sree Krishna temples in Kerala and Paramekkavu Bagavathi Temple which is one of the largest Bagavathi temples in Kerala is also situated in the city. Aykunnu Pandavagiri Devi Temple is situated at Venginisseri village, that around 9 km from city center. Sree Guruvayurappan Temple is located in Guruvayur (28 km from Thrissur); it is also referred to as Bhuloka Vaikunta which means "Holy Abode of Vishnu on Earth".

Asia's tallest church, the Our Lady of Dolours Syro-Malabar Catholic Basilica (Puthan Pally), Our Lady of Lourdes Syro-Malabar Catholic Metropolitan Cathedral which has an underground shrine, Saint Antony's Syro-Malabar Church, Ollur which has been called as Chinna Roma (Small Rome) are masterpieces of architecture and indigenous paintings. Saint Euphrasia's tomb and museum also situated in the city. St. Thomas Syro-Malabar Church, Palayur (28 km from Thrissur) is the first church in India, and Thomas the Apostle performed the first baptism in India here.

The Chettiyangadi Hanafi Mosque in Thrissur City is one of the oldest mosque in Thrissur. Cheraman Juma Mosque in Kodungallur, (40 km from Thrissur) is the first mosque in India.

=== Cuisine ===
The cuisine of Thrissur is linked to its history, geography, demography and culture. Rice is the staple food. Achappam, Kuzhalappam, Vatteppam, Unniyappam and Pazham Pori are common snacks. Vellayappam, a kind of rice hopper is another dish which is special to the city, they have a food street named vellayappam angadi.

== Education ==
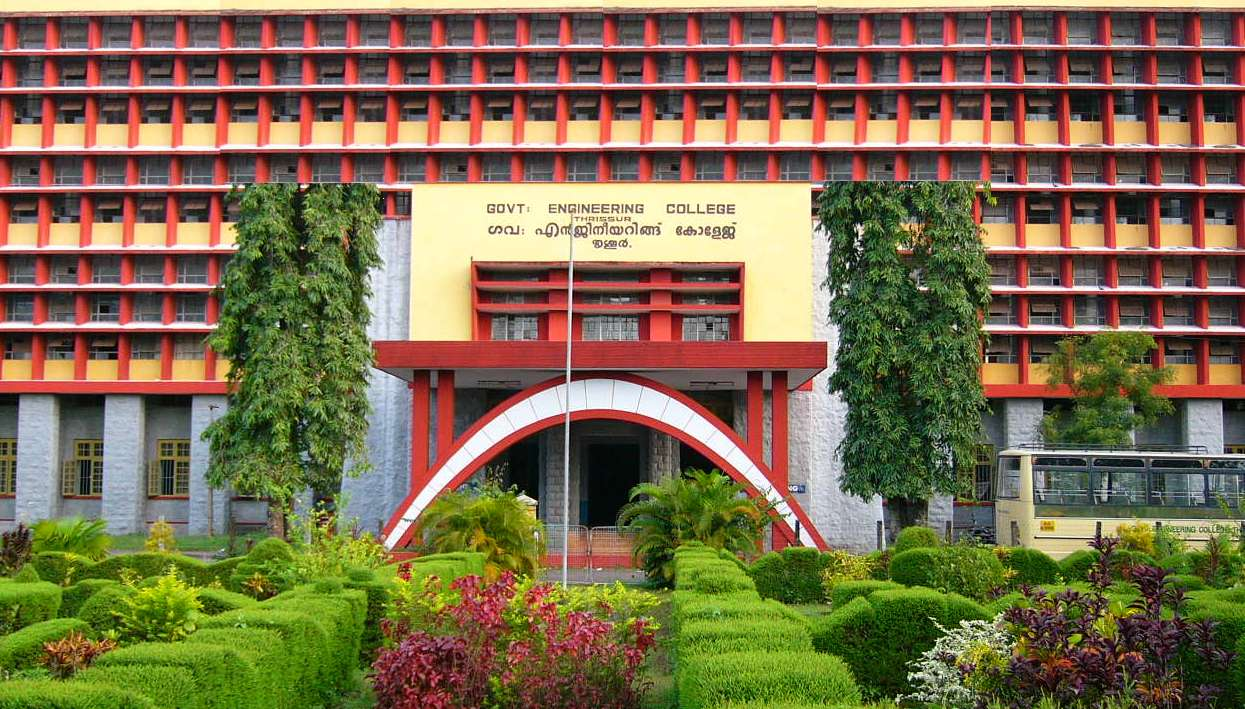
Government Engineering College, Thrissur

Thrissur, which has been a centre of learning from ancient times, is developing as a modern education hub. Schools in city are either run publicly by the Kerala Government or privately, some with financial aid from the Government. Education is generally conducted in English or Malayalam, with the former being the majority. Most schools are affiliated with the Kerala Board of Public Examination, Indian Certificate of Secondary Education (ICSE), the Central Board of Secondary Education (CBSE), the National Institute of Open Schooling (NIOS) or the Montessori system. There are 93 lower primary schools; 34 upper primary schools; and 78 high schools; and 157 higher secondary schools in the city. Church Mission Society School started in 1845 is the oldest school and St. Thomas College is the first college in Thrissur. On 2 September 2022, Thrissur joined the UNESCO Global Network of Learning Cities (GNLC).

Geethu Krishna M.G., a research scholar from this district to join Botanical Survey of India. Her work on 'Indigenous knowledge coastline sacred groves in Central Kerala, India' is notable in Botanical research.

== Healthcare ==
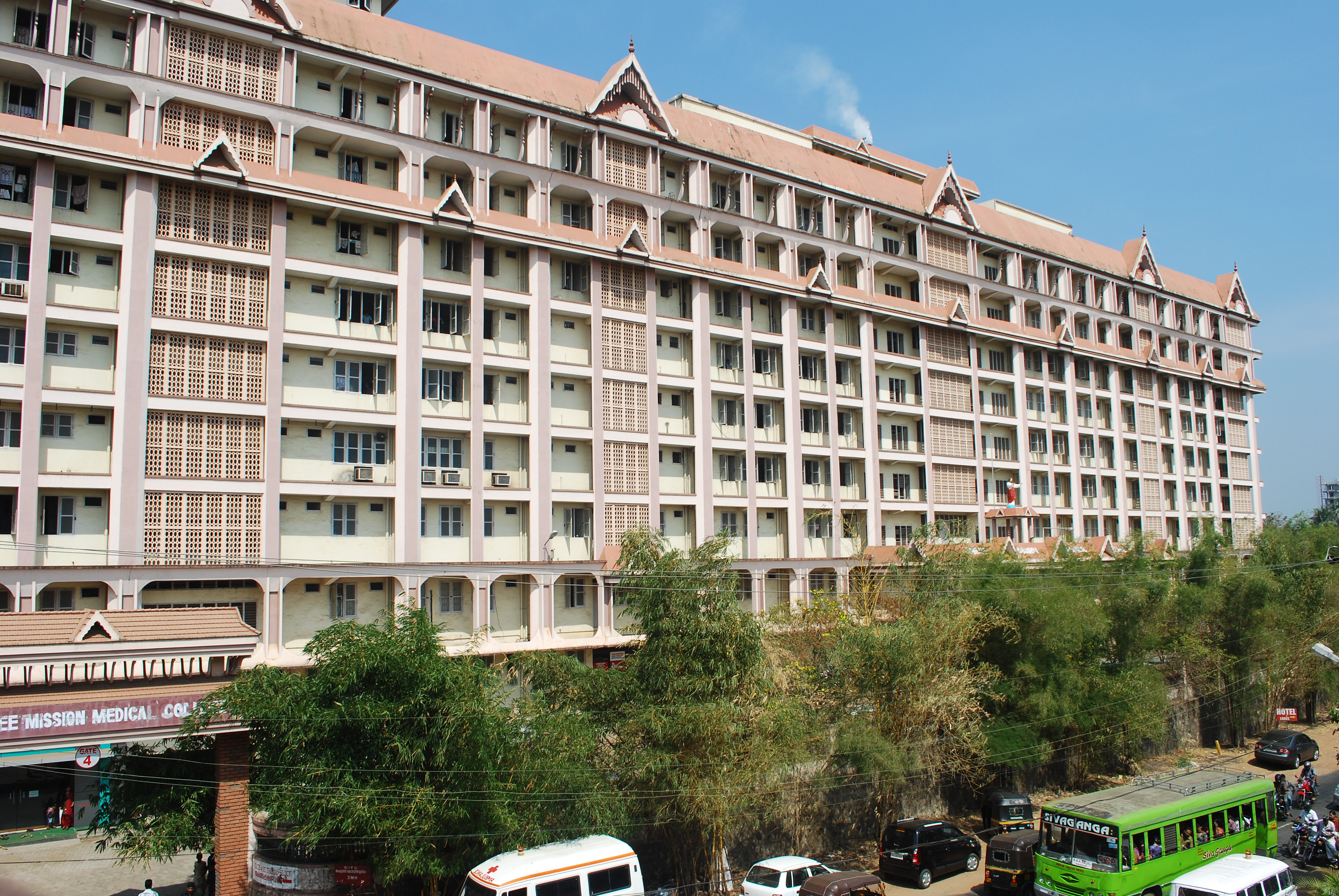
Jubilee Mission Medical College and Research Institute, a Syro-Malabar Catholic Archdiocese of Thrissur run medical college.

The city serves as a centre for healthcare in Central Kerala, with people from Thrissur district, Palakkad district, Malappuram district and the northern part of Ernakulam district coming to Thrissur for medical care. There are three medical colleges in the city: Government Medical College, Thrissur, Amala Institute of Medical Sciences, and Jubilee Mission Medical College and Research Institute. The Vaidyaratnam Ayurveda Medical College also situated in city.

== Sports ==
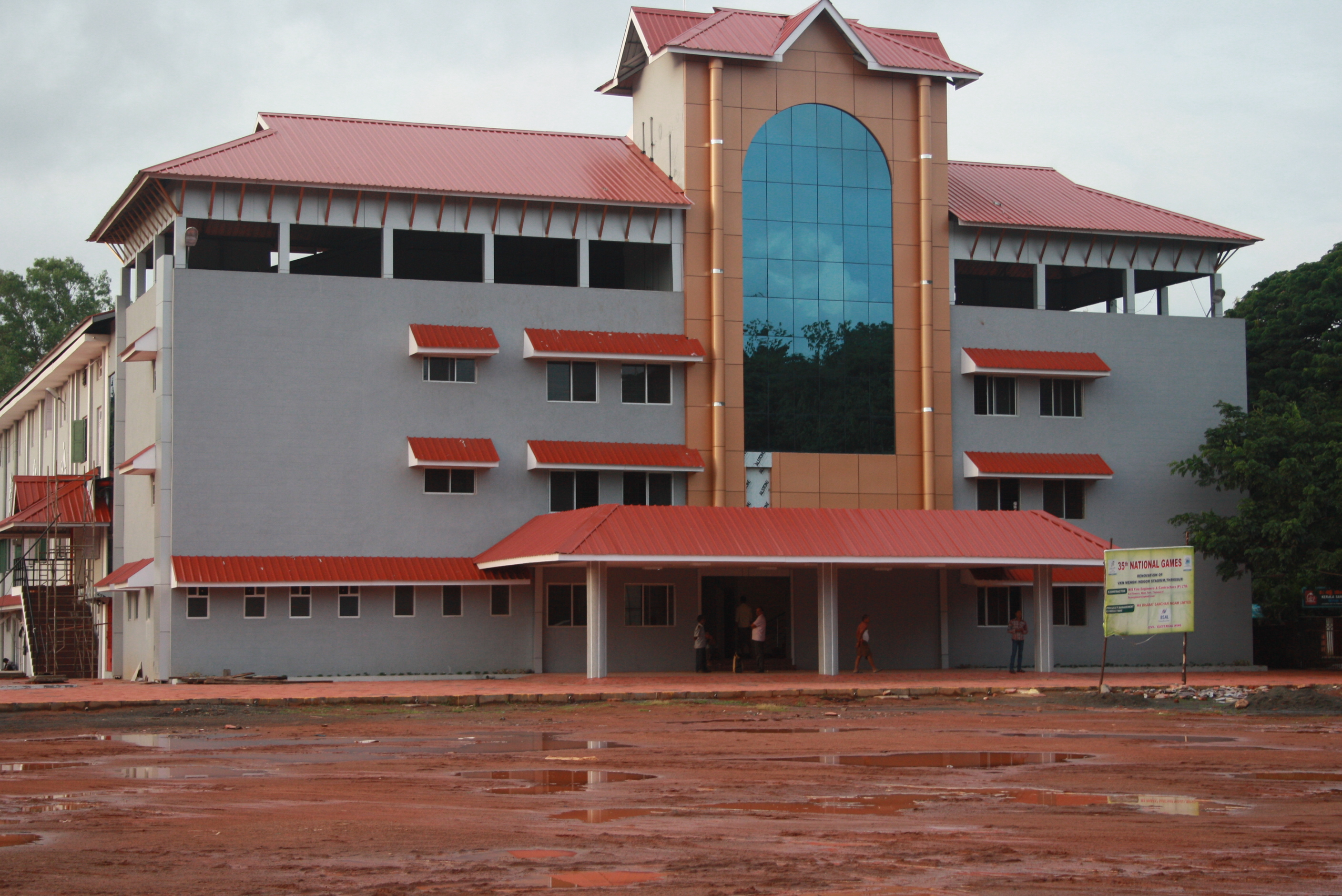
V.K.N. Menon Indoor Stadium in Thrissur city

Football is the most popular sport in the city, and there are two football stadiums in the city, Thrissur Municipal Corporation Stadium and Thope Stadium.The largest and highest temporary stadium in the world as per Guinness Book of World Records was built in the Thrissur Corporation Ground in 1990 for the occasion of Federation Cup football tournament, which was designed by Er. TJ Antony. International ballers and former Indian captains C. V. Pappachan, I. M. Vijayan and Jo Paul Ancheri, and the Under 17 World Cup player K. P. Rahul belongs to Thrissur. The N.I. David Memorial Trophy, an annual inter-club football tournament is held in Thrissur every year. The football championship was started in 1996 by the Superintendent of Police, Thrissur. The city has a floodlit stadium, known as Thrissur Municipal Corporation Stadium. It also has two indoor stadiums, V.K.N. Menon Indoor Stadium and a SAI maintained Thrissur Aquatic Complex with international facilities. Thrissur has contributed many national and international bodybuilding stars to India. Chess prodigy Nihal Sarin is from Thrissur.

== Media ==
The first Malayalam newspaper which published from Thrissur was Lokamanyan in 1920. Then came Deenabandhu edited by V. R. Krishnan Ezhuthachan. Ezhuthachan started publishing as a weekly in 1941 from Thrissur. It was one of the first periodicals that supported the national movement. As soon as the Quit India movement was started, its editor and staff were sent to jail and publications were banned. Later Lokamanyan (1920); Kerala Chintamani (1905); Kerala Kesari (1924); Mahatma (1930); Gomathy (1930) and Navajeevan of Joseph Mundassery was also published from Thrissur. The Express started in 1944 from Thrissur with K Krishanan as the editor is known in Central Kerala for its nationalist and socialist views. Major Malayalam newspapers published in Thrissur include Malayala Manorama, Mathrubhumi, Madhyamam, Deepika, Kerala Kaumudi, Deshabhimani, Mangalam, Veekshanam, Metro Vaartha and Janayugom. A number of evening papers, like General in Malayalam and City Journal in English, are also published from the city. Newspapers in other regional languages like Hindi, Kannada, Tamil and Telugu are also available in city.

The first cinema hall in Kerala, with a manually operated film projector, was opened in Thrissur by Jose Kattookkaran in 1907. In 1913, the first electrically operated film projector was established in city again by Jose Kattookkaran and was called the Jose Electrical Bioscope now known as Jos Theatre.

A film festival, known as the ViBGYOR Film Festival, used to be held in the city every year until 2019. It was an international short and documentary film festival. Telecom services are provided by various players like Airtel, Vodafone Idea, Jio, and the state-owned BSNL.

Private FM radio stations in the Thrissur are Club FM 104.8 MHz, Radio Mango 91.9 MHz, Red FM 91.1 MHz. All India Radio has an AM (630 kHz) and an FM (101.1 MHz) station for the city. The transmitter of the All India Radio (630 kHz) was commissioned on 4 November 1956. The station started independent broadcasting in 1974. Thrissur has a Doordarshan studio with a low power transmitter located near the studio.

== Transport ==
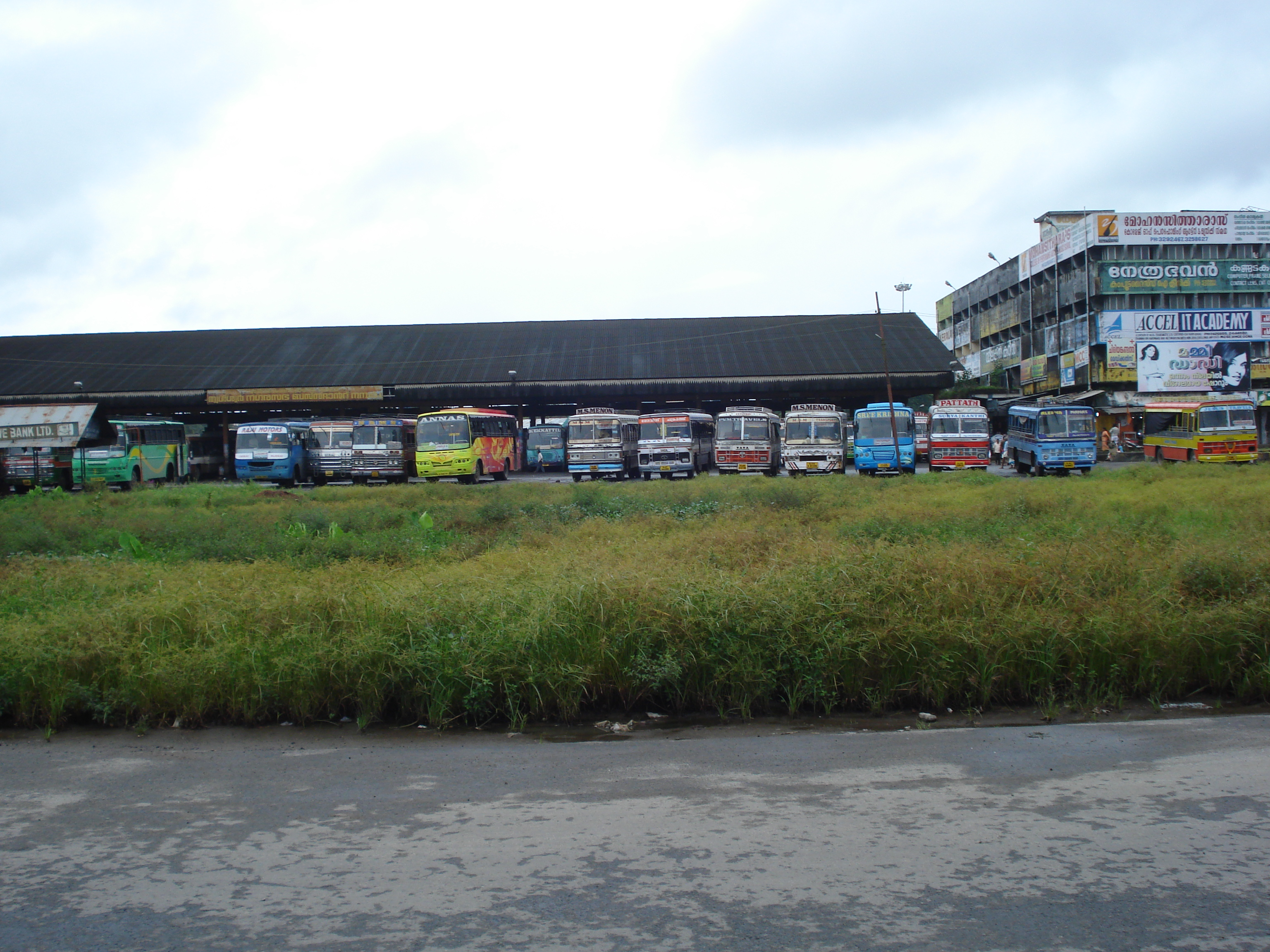
Shaktan Thampuran Private Bus Stand, Thrissur, is the largest private bus station in Kerala State.

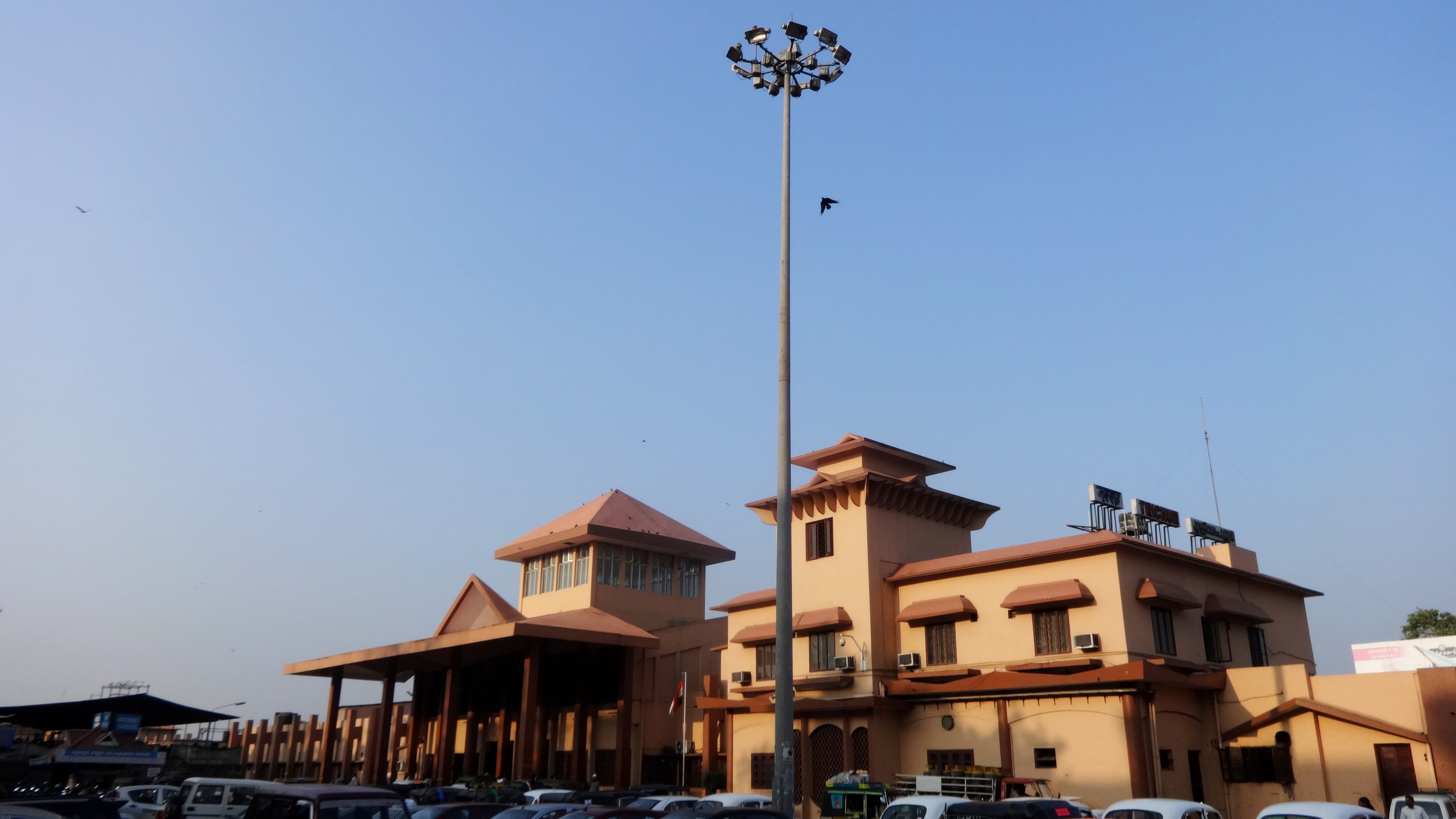
Thrissur railway station

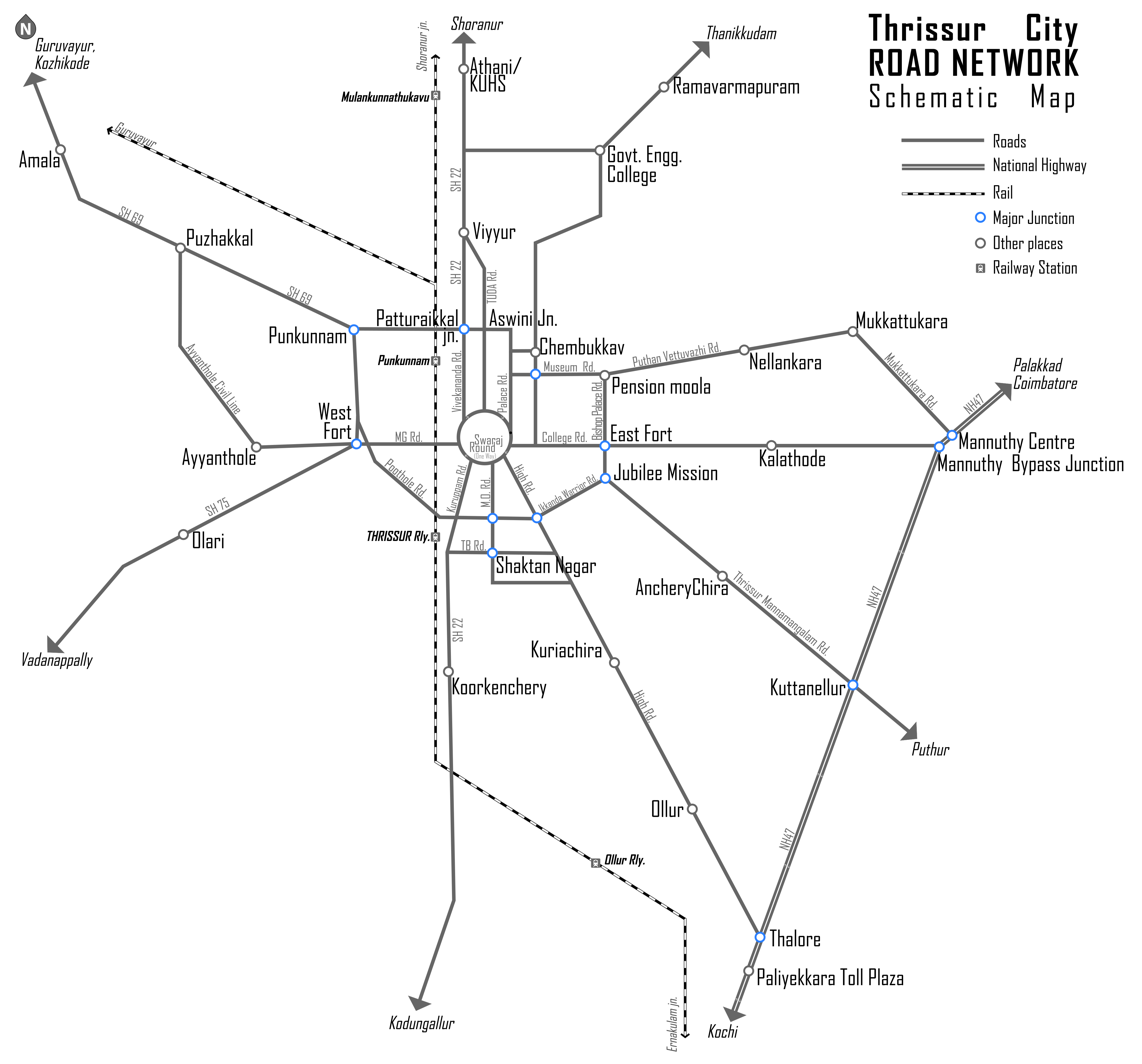
Schematic Road network map of Thrissur City

=== Road ===
The city is connected to the North-South Corridor National Highway (India) via the four-lane National Highway 544, previously NH 47. The highway traverses through the entire length and breadth of the city from different points and provides access to the nearby cities such of Kochi, Palakkad and Coimbatore. NH 544 provides two main exit points at Mannuthy and Thalore which is bypass to the Thrissur city.

The city is largely dependent on private buses, taxis and auto rickshaws for public transport.

State-owned Kerala State Road Transport Corporation (KSRTC) runs inter-state, inter-district and city services. Thrissur has three bus stations, the Shaktan Thampuran Private Bus Stand, Thrissur in Sakthan Thampuran Nagar, Vadakke Stand (Northern Bus Stand) and the Thrissur KSRTC Bus Station near the Thrissur railway station. State Highway (SH 69) Thrissur-Kuttippuram Road, SH 22 Kodungallur – Shornur Road, SH 75 Thrissur – Kanjani – Vadanappally Road are the three state highways which connect city with its suburbs and municipalities.

=== Railway ===
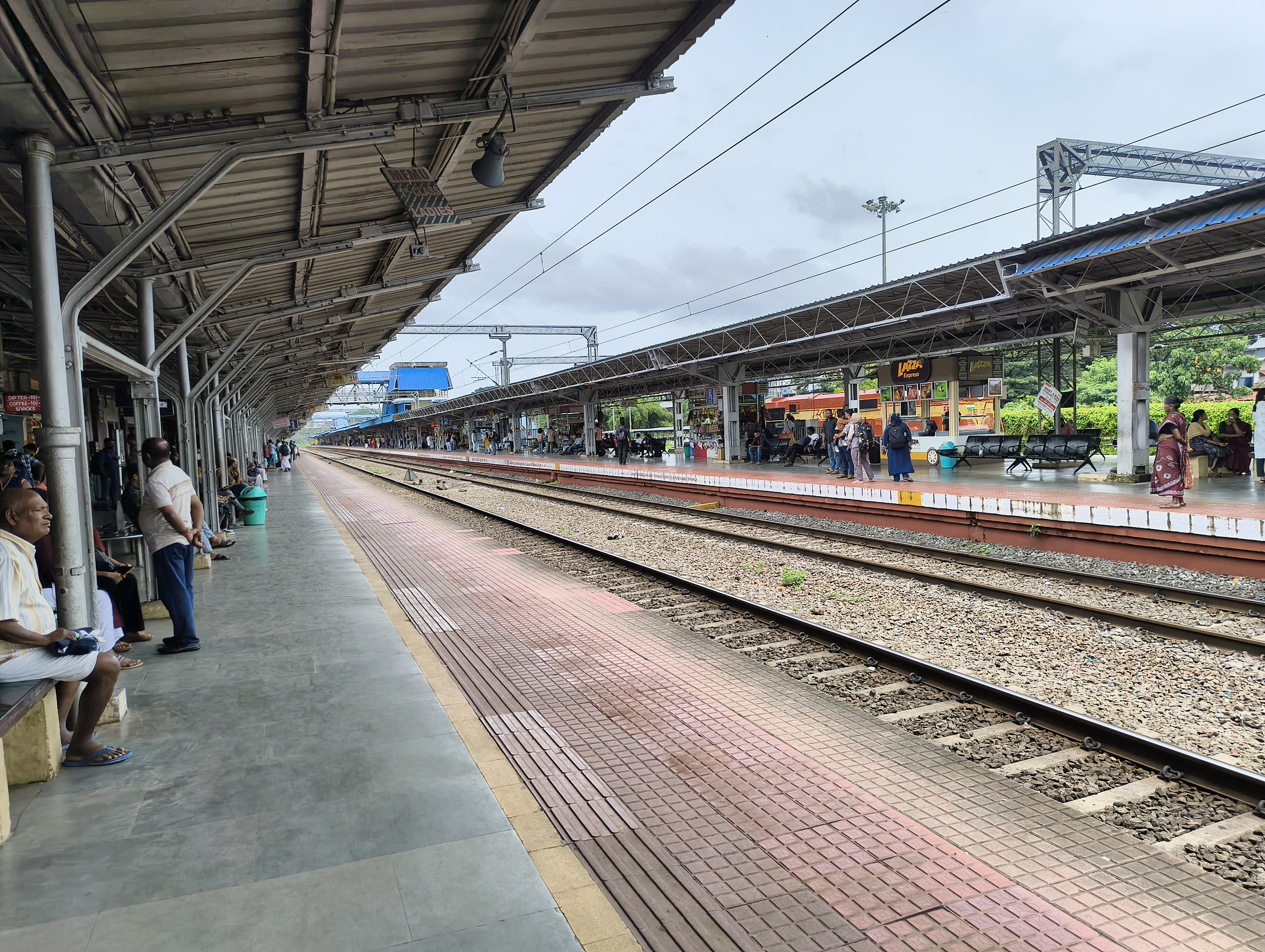
Platform of Thrissur Railway Station

The Southern Railway zone of the Indian Railways operates the main rail transport system in Thrissur. There are four railway stations in Thrissur city. Thrissur railway station, one of the five NSG-2 category railway stations in Trivandrum Division of Southern Railways, provides trains to three directions and lies on the busy Shoranur–Cochin Harbour section. It has a satellite station, Punkunnam railway station and two minor stations, Ollur railway station and Mulankunnathukavu railway station. Thrissur railway station also connects to the temple town of Guruvayur by Guruvayur–Thrissur spur line. In addition, Southern Railway is running a suburban railway system connecting Thrissur to Kochi and Palakkad using Mainline Electrical Multiple Unit services (MEMU).

== Maps of Thrissur ==
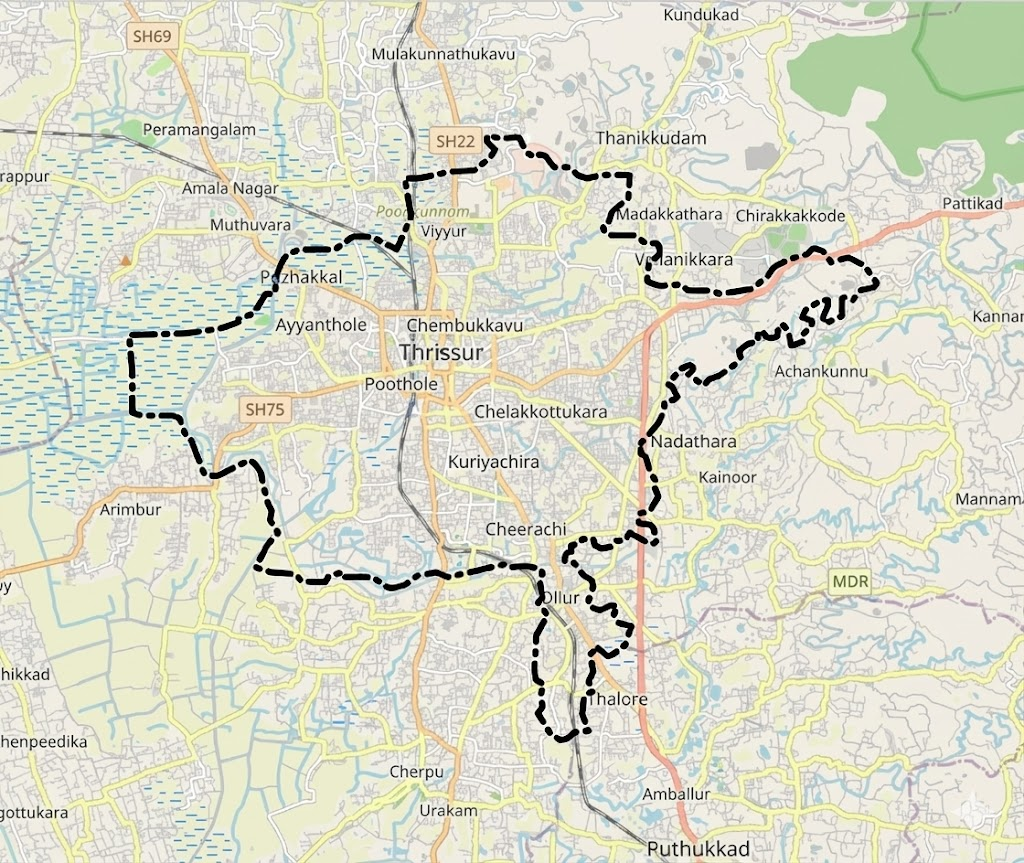
Map showing the boundary of Thrissur Municipal Corporation

Map showing the 56 divisions of Thrissur Municipal Corporation as per the delimitation order published on 30 May 2025
Map showing the boundaries of all the 56 divisions of Thrissur Municipal Corporation, published on 30 May 2025.
The numbers and the names of the divisions
1. Punkunnam (പൂങ്കുന്നം); 2. Kuttankulangara (കുട്ടംകുളങ്ങര); 3. Patturaikal (പാട്ടുരായ്കൽ); 4. Viyyur (വിയ്യൂർ); 5. Peringavu (പെരിങ്ങാവ്); 6. Ramavarmapuram (രാമവർമപുരം); 7. Kuttumukku (കുറ്റുമുക്ക്); 8. Villadam (വില്ലടം); 9. Cherur (ചേറൂർ); 10. Gandhi Nagar (ഗാന്ധി നഗർ); 11. Mukkattukara (മുക്കാട്ടുകര); 12. Nettissery (നെട്ടിശ്ശേരി); 13. Mullakkara (മുല്ലക്കര); 14. Mannuthy (മണ്ണുത്തി); 15. Ollukkara (ഒല്ലൂക്കര); 16. Nadathara (നടത്തറ); 17. Kuttanellur (കുട്ടനെല്ലൂർ); 18. Chelakkottukara (ചേലക്കോട്ടുകര); 19. Kalathodu (കാളത്തോട്); 20. Paravattani (പറവട്ടാനി)	21. Kizhakkumpattukara (കിഴക്കുമ്പാട്ടുകര); 22. Chembukkavu (ചെമ്പുക്കാവ്); 23. Mission Quarters (മിഷൻ ക്വാർട്ടേർസ്); 24. Kuriachira (കുരിയച്ചിറ); 25. Valarkavu (വളർകാവ്); 26. Ancheri (അഞ്ചേരി); 27. Patavarad (പടവരാട്); 28. Ollur Centre (ഒല്ലൂർ സെന്റർ); 29. Edakkunni (എടക്കുന്നി); 30. Thaikkattussery (തൈക്കാട്ടുശ്ശേരി); 31. Cheerachy (ചീരാച്ചി); 32. Chiyyaram South (ചിയ്യാരം സൗത്ത്); 33. Chiyyaram (ചിയ്യാരം); 34. Kuriachira West (കുരിയച്ചിറ വെസ്റ്റ്); 35. Kannamkulangara (കണ്ണംകുളങ്ങര); 36. Thekkinkadu (തേക്കിൻകാട്); 37. Thiruvambady (തിരുവമ്പാടി); 38. Kottappuram (കോട്ടപ്പുറം); 39. Poothole (പൂത്തോൾ); 40. Kokkala (കൊക്കാല)	41. Vadookkara (വടൂക്കര); 42. Koorkenchery (കൂർക്കഞ്ചേരി); 43. Kanimangalam (കണിമംഗലം); 44. Panamukku (പനമുക്ക്); 45. Nedupuzha (നെടുപുഴ); 46. Kariattukara (കാര്യാട്ടുകര); 47. Laloor (ലാലൂർ); 48. Aranattukara (അരണാട്ടുകര); 49. Kanattukara (കാനാട്ടുകര); 50. Udayanagar (ഉദയനഗർ); 51. Ayyanthole (അയ്യന്തോൾ); 52. Olari (ഒളരി); 53. Elthuruth (എൽതുരുത്ത്); 54. Chettupuzha (ചേറ്റുപുഴ); 55. Pullazhi (പുല്ലഴി); 56. Puthurkara (പുതൂർക്കര)
(Click HERE to see the official map.)

== Picture gallery ==
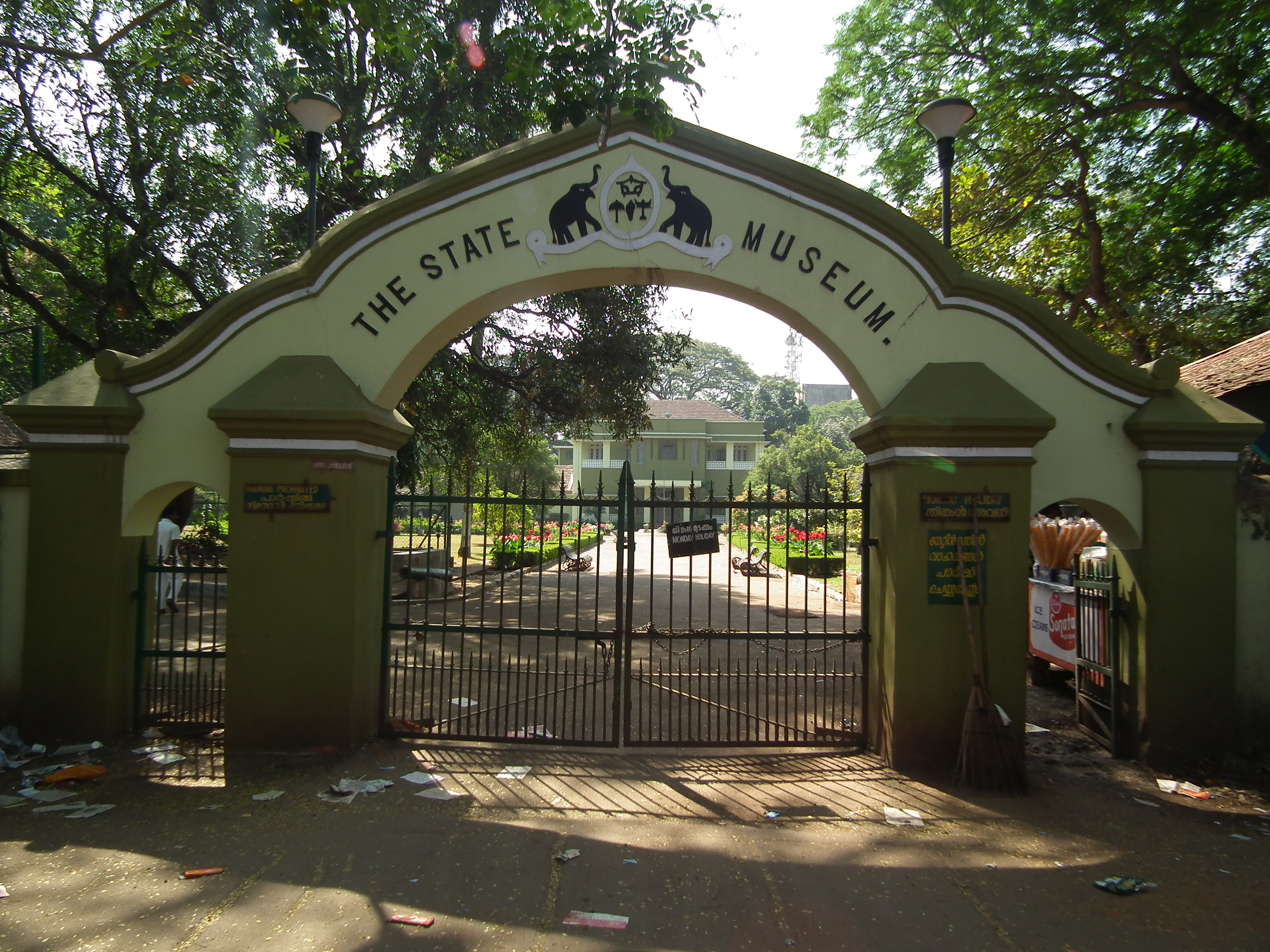
Entrance gate of Thrissur Zoo

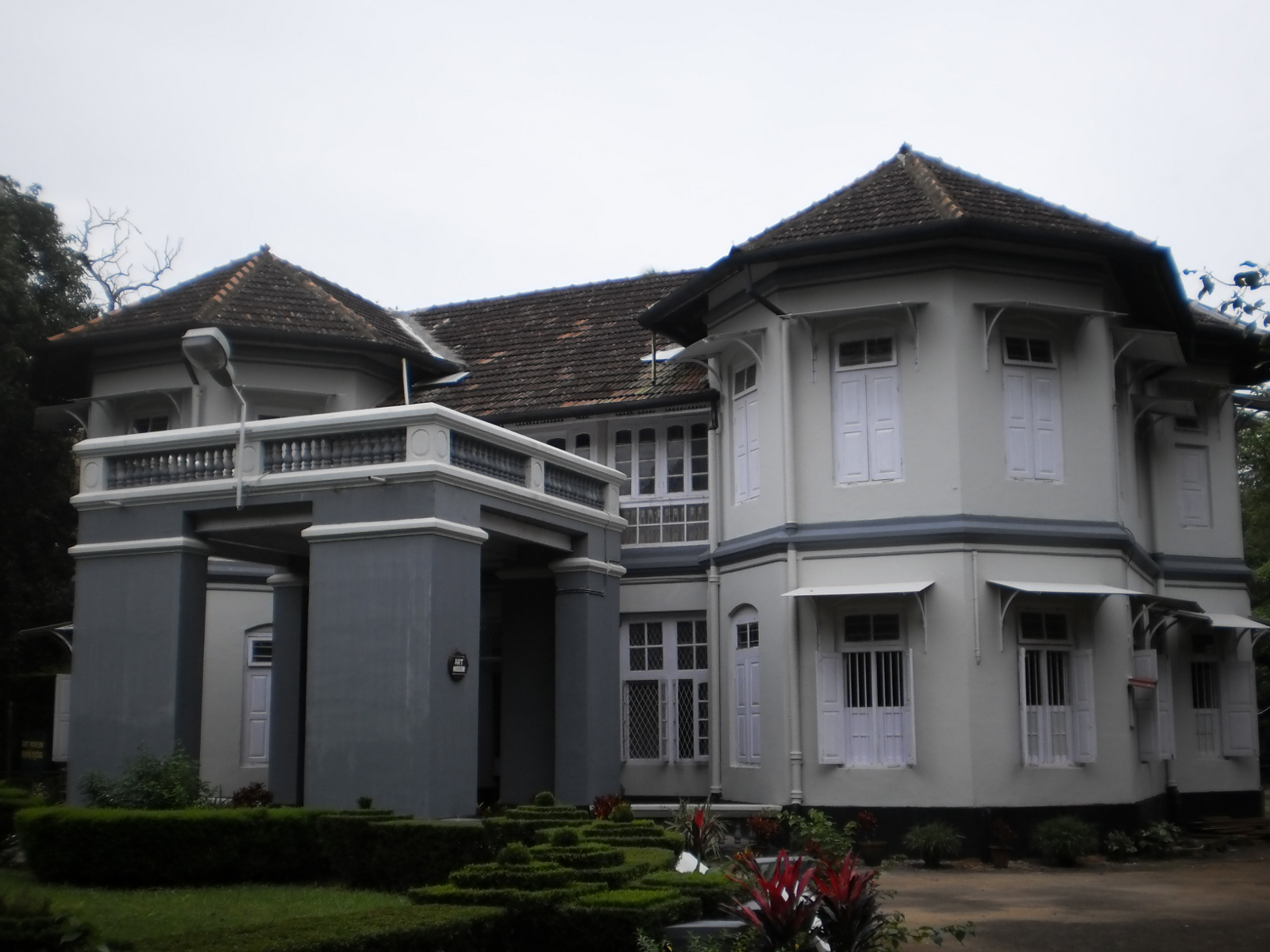
Archaeological Museum, Thrissur

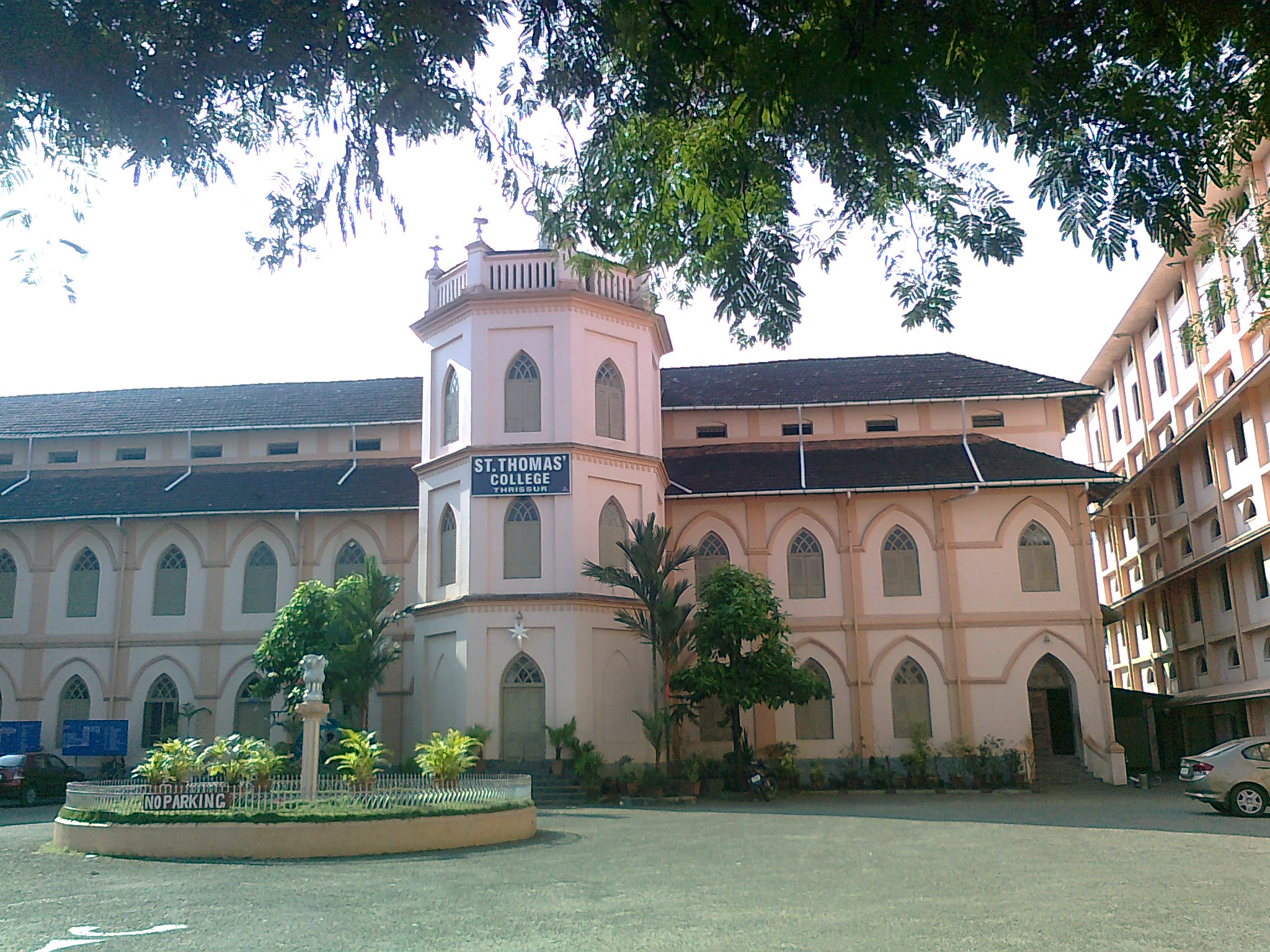
St. Thomas College, Thrissur

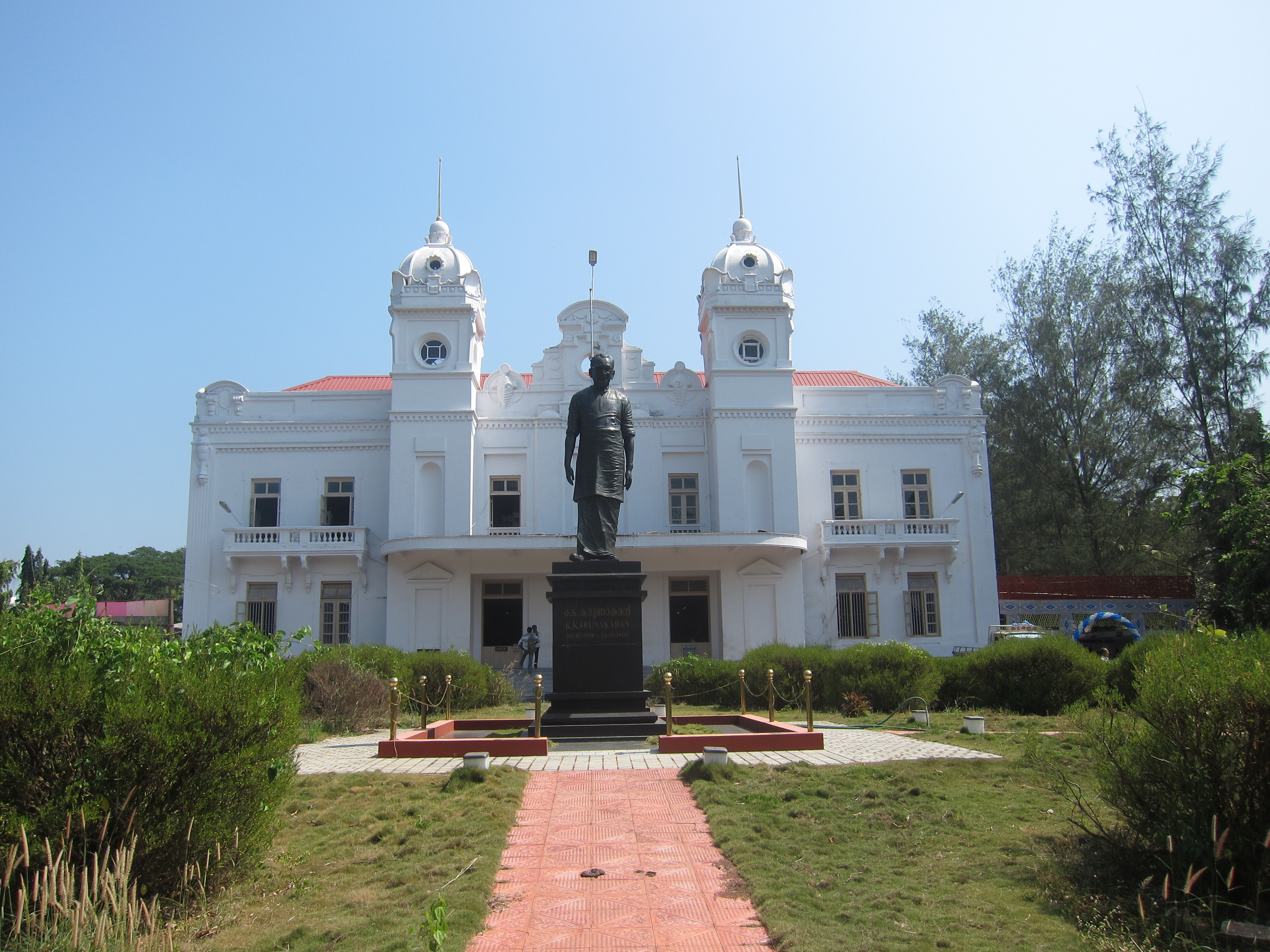
Thrissur Town Hall

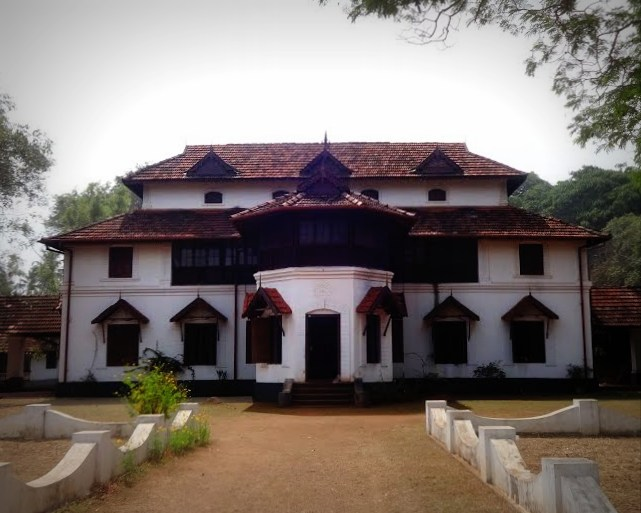
Mural Art Museum

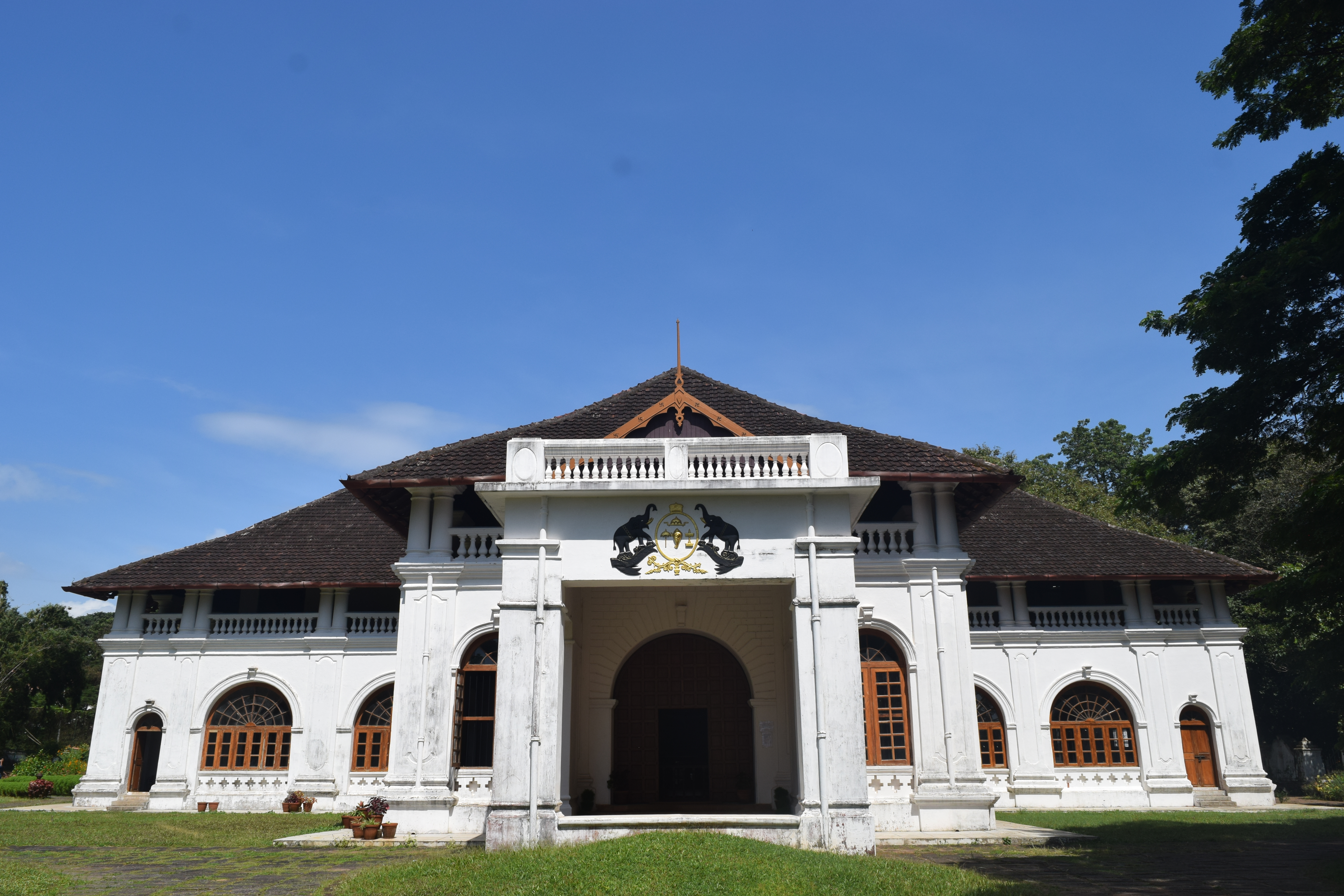
Shakthan Thampuran Palace

== Twin Cities ==
Thrissur is twinned with:

- Yessentuki, Russia

== See also ==
- Thrissur Municipal Corporation
- Thrissur in popular culture
- List of Thrissur Corporation wards
- List of people from Thrissur
- List of twin towns and sister cities in India
- Largest Indian Cities by GDP
