= Ramanilayam =

Ramanilayam (Malayalam:രാമ നിലയം) is a guest house owned by the Government of Kerala situated in the centre of Thrissur city of Kerala, India.

== Description ==
The building was constructed during British Raj period. Before it was converted to a guest house, it was the residence for Political officers of the United Kingdom. The guest house has 30 rooms in three blocks, and two VIP rooms. Politicians and bureaucrats get more priority in the allocation of rooms. The Government of Kerala is planning to add 40 more rooms by constructing one more block. The Kerala Tourism Department runs the facility. Being a government guest house, it has witnessed many major events in the political history of Kerala.

== See also ==
- Thrissur District
