= Department of Cultural Affairs (Kerala) =

State government agency of Kerala, India

Agency overview
- Jurisdiction: Government of Kerala
- Headquarters: Thiruvananthapuram, Kerala, India; 8°29′19.7″N 76°57′27.3″E
- Annual budget: ₹372.4075 crore (US$39 million) (2026–27, revised)
- Ministers responsible: P. C. Vishnunadh, Minister for Cultural Affairs and Cinema; O. J. Janeesh, Minister for Archaeology, Archives and Mesueum, Zoos
- Agency executives: Minhaj Alam IAS, Additional Chief Secretary (Cultural Affairs, Archeology, Archives, Zoos and Museums); MD Inbasekar K I.A.S, Director of Cultural Affairs; E Dinesan, Director of Archeology; Parvathy. S, Director of Archives; P.S Manjula Devi, Director of Museums and Zoos
- Website: Official website

The Department of Cultural Affairs is a department working under the Government of Kerala. The department is formed to promote and preserve the culture and heritage of Kerala. Several cultural organisations operate under this department.

== Activities ==
=== Cultural Affairs (A) Department ===
- Papers relating to Kerala Kalamandalam, Kerala Sahitya Academy, Kera la Sangeetha Nataka Academy, Kerala Folklore Academy, Kerala Lalithakala Academy, Bharat Bhavan, Thulu Academy
- Audit Reports, L.A. interpellation, Subject Committee Report, Estimate Committee report, O. P. Etc.
- Issuing Awards such as Ezhuthachan puraskaram, Kathakali Puraskaram, Pallavoor Appu Marar Puraskaram, Raja Ravivarma Puraskaram, Keraleeya Nritha Natya Puraskaram.
- Papers relating to Grant-in-aid to Jawahar Bala Bhavan in the State and allied matters.
- Grant-in-aid to memorials to eminent men of arts and letters and allied matters.
- Grant-in-aid to Cultural Organisations in the State and NRG to various Cultural Institutions.
- Papers relating to Kerala State Chalachitra Academy, Kerala State Film Development Corporation.
- Related papers with L.A., Apex Committee Meeting etc. and Miscellaneous papers.

=== Cultural Affairs (B) Department ===
- Papers relating to Archaeology Department, Centre for Heritage Studies
- Papers relating to Administration and Establishment matters of Museum & Zoo
- Multi Purpose Cultural Complex Society (Vyloppilly Samskrithi Bhavan).
- Miscellaneous papers of Cultural Affairs (B) Department.
- Papers relating to South Zone Cultural Centre and Swathi Sangeetholsavam.
- Cinema-TV Awards, Cultural Exchange Programme, Monthly Plan Progress.
- Papers related to Budget proposals of Cultural Affairs Department, Subject Committee, Vasthuvidya Gurukulam and Cine Artists' Pension.
- Paper related to Subsidy for Malayalam film and grant to federation of film societies of India
- Sanctioning of grant for the conduct of International Film Festival, Kerala

=== Cultural Affairs (C) Department ===
- All papers relating to State Institute of Languages, Kerala State Institute of Children's Literature, State Institute of Encyclopaedic Publications, Kerala State Book Mark, Konkani Sahithya Academy, Kerala State Cultural Activists Welfare Fund Board.
- Pension papers of Kerala Government Cultural Institution Employees Pension Scheme.
- All papers of State Archives Department & Directorate of Culture
- Monthly pension to artists who are in indigent circumstances, Arrear pension of pensioner to his/her heirs.
- Financial Assistance to Artists for Medical treatment, Central-state pension to artists.
- All miscellaneous papers relating to the Section.
- Consolidation work of Cultural Affairs Department.
- L. A. Interpellation.
- Monthly Business Statement.
- Papers related to classical language Status to Malayalam

== Organisations under the department ==
- Directorate of Culture
- Department of Archaeology
- Department of Archives
- Museum and Zoo Department
- Kerala Sahitya Akademi
- Kerala State Chalachithra Academy
- Kerala Sangeetha Nataka Akademi
- Kerala Lalithakala Akademi
- Kerala Folklore Academy
- Konkani Sahithya Academy
- Tulu Academy
- Mahakavi Moyinkutty Vaidyar Mappila Kala Academy
- Urdu Academy
- State Institute of Languages
- Kerala State Institute of Children's Literature
- State Institute of Encyclopaedic Publications
- Kerala State Book Mark
- Malayalam Mission
- Vyloppilly Samskrithi Bhavan
- Vasthuvidya Gurukulam
- Bharath Bhavan
- Guru Gopinath Natana Gramam
- Centre for Heritage Studies
- Sreenarayana International Study Centre
- Kumaran Asan National Institute of Culture
- Jawahar Bala Bhavan
- Kerala Kalamandalam
- Kerala State Film Development Corporation
- Kerala State Cultural Activists Welfare Fund Board
- Pallana Kumaranasan Smarakam
- O. V. Vijayan Smarakam
- Kunchan Nambiyar Smarakam Ampalapuzha
- Thakazhi Smarakam
- Kunjunnimash Smarakam
- Kunjan Nambiar Smarakam
- Vaikom Muhammad Basheer Smaraka Trust
- Govinda Pai Smaraka Samithy
- Parthi Subbah Yakshagana Samithi
- Narendraprasad Smaraka Nadaka Padana Gaveshana Kendram
- Unnaiwarrier Smaraka Kala Nilayam
- Mayyanad C. Kesavan Smarakom
- Cherayi Sahodharan Ayyappan Smaraka Samithi
- Sarasakavi Mulur Smarakom
- A. R. Rajarajavarma Smaraka Samithi
- Thunchan Memorial Trust

== See also ==
- Department of Finance
- Kerala Forest Department
- Department of Information and Public Relations
- Department of Non-Resident Keralites Affairs
- Kerala Public Works Department
- Department of Tourism
- Department of Revenue
- Department of Food, Civil Supplies & Consumer Affairs
- Department of Industries and Commerce
- General Education Department
