= Ramavarmapuram =

- Suburb
- Location in Kerala, India
- Coordinates: 10.55992°N 76.23104°E
- Country: India
- State: Kerala
- District: Thrissur
- Ward: 4
- Named honouring Cochin Kings: 1956

Government
  - Body: Thrissur Municipal Corporation
  - Councillor: V K Suresh Kumar
  - Corporation Mayor: Prof R Bindu

Languages
  - Official: Malayalam, English
- Time zone: UTC+5:30 (IST)
- PIN: 680631
- Lok Sabha constituency: Thrissur
- Legislative Assembly constituency: Thrissur
- Civic agency: Thrissur Municipal Corporation
- Distance from Thrissur Railway Station: 6 kilometres (3.7 mi) N (Road)

Ramavarmapuram is the northern suburb of Thrissur City in Kerala. It is home to several governmental and other institutions. The largest menhir type megalithic monument in granite in Kerala is found there.

At the time of the founding of a broadcasting station of All India Radio in Thrissur, the place where the station was established was renamed as Ramavarmapuram. Prior to that the place was known as Anappara. The original place name is still used locally. Over the years the place specified as Ramavarmapuram expanded to include the entire region in the northern suburbs of Thrissur City. After of the formation of Thrissur Municipal Corporation in September 2000, one of the fifty-two divisions of the city has been named Ramavarmapuram.

== Origin of the name ==
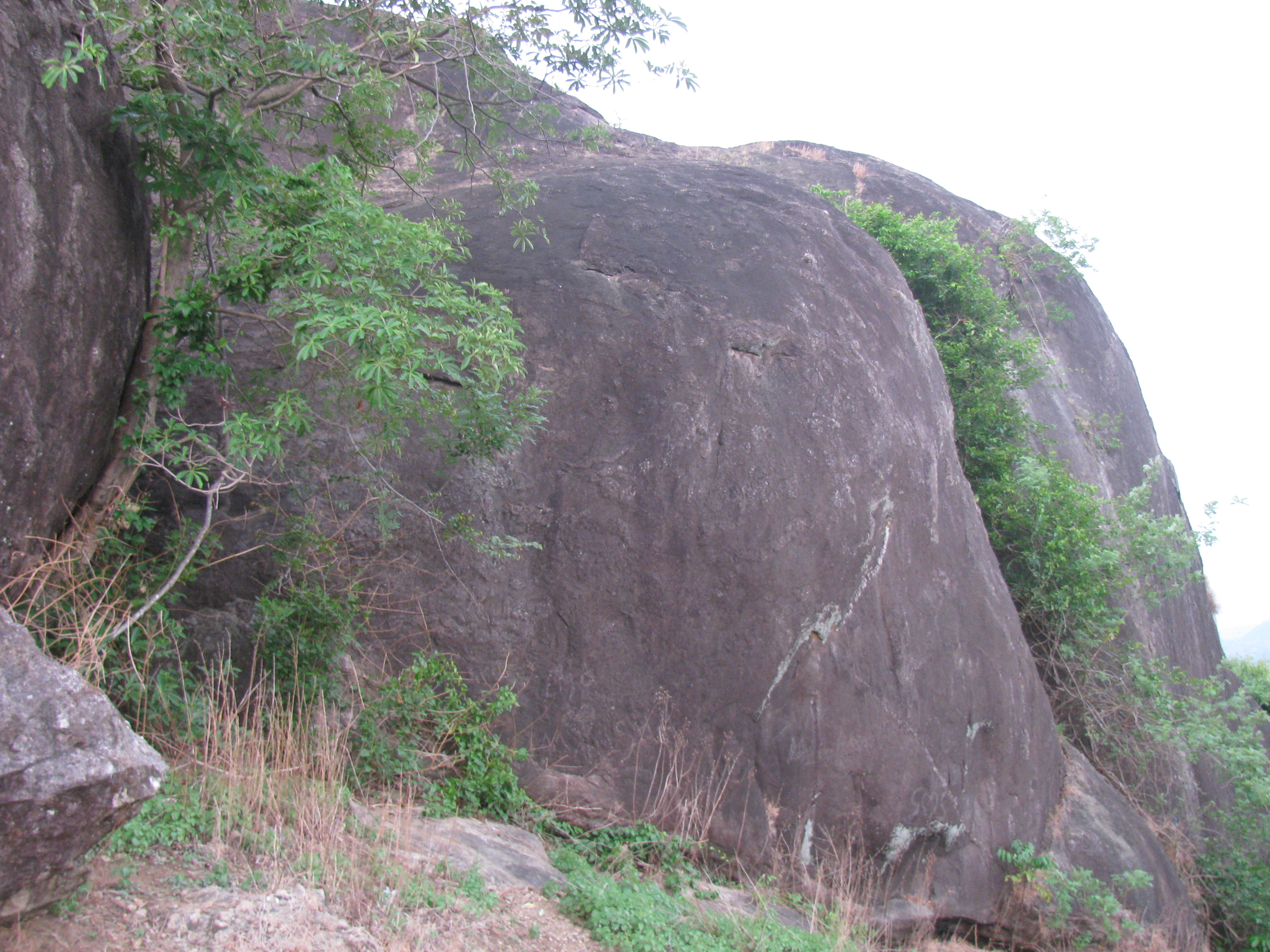
Elephant Rock in Ramavarmapuram

A part of the real estate holdings of the Cochin royal family was acquired by the government for setting up a broadcasting station of All India Radio in Thrissur. The place where the station was established was named as Ramavarmapuram in honour and to perpetuate the memory of Rama Varma the donor of the land. The word 'Ramavarmapuram' can be loosely translated into English as 'Rama Varma's land'. The donor was the last king of the princely state of Cochin, Rama Varma Kunjunni Thampuran known popularly as Pareekshith Thampuran. He was born on 15 August 1876 and crowned as king in July 1948. On 1 July 1949, the princely states of Travancore and Cochin were integrated to form the Travancore-Cochin state. With that merger Thampuran ceased to be the Maharaja of Cochin. He died in November 1964 at Thripunithura.

In Cochin royal family all the male members were named according to the following convention: eldest son to a mother - Rama Varma, second son - Kerala Varma and third son - Ravi Varma. Because of this convention the official names of most of the rulers of Cochin were Rama Varma. Counting since 1500 CE Parikshith Thampuran was the eighteenth king named Rama Varma in the history of Cochin.

== Parukutty Nethyar Amma connection ==
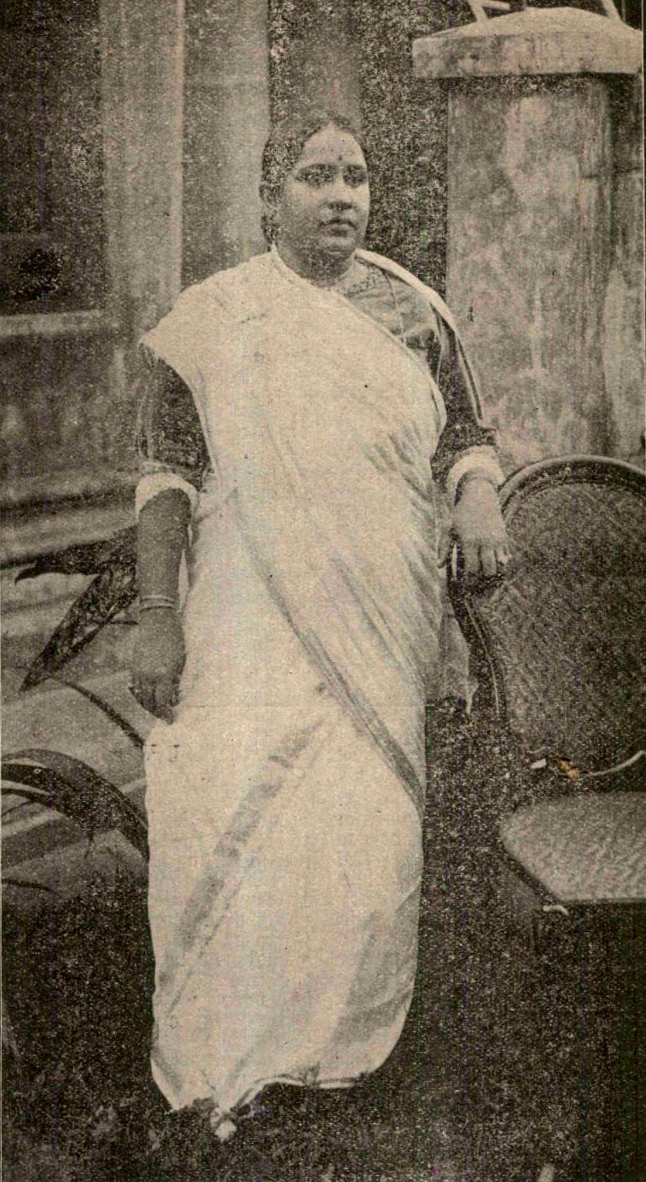
Parukutty Nethyar Amma

Parukutty Nethyar Amma (5 July 1875 - 25 February 1963) was the consort of the ruler of the Kingdom of Cochin, Maharaja Rama Varma XVI (popularly known as Madrassil Theepetta Thampuran), who reigned from 1914 to 1932. Nethyar Amma had a powerful influence in the administration of the Kingdom during the reign of Rama Varma XVI. In a biography of Nethyar Amma published in 2022, one can find this passage: "During the abdicated Raja's period of rule, the Central jail at Ernakulam had been transferred to a park in Viyyur, near Trichur, to a location that once housed the Trichur Zoo. That zoo had been closed in 1912 and the animals had been sent to Madras. Parukutty sold a thousand acres in Viyyur that she personally owned to the state for Rs 1. Of these, 200 acres next to the Central Jail were utilized to extend the jail grounds. She wanted to use the remaining 800 acres to create a township - Rama Varma Puram - in honour of Maharaja Rama Varma XVI. The intent was to create a university town similar to Oxford and to move the main colleges such as the Maharaja's College in Ernakulam to these premises. She also wanted to establish an engineering college, a veterinary college, an agricultural college and a medical college there." A website on the history of Cochin royal family states that from the official correspondences between British India Govt officials of the period one can infer that there indeed was a plan "... to move the Maharaja’s College from Ernakulam to Ramavarmapuram near Thrissur".

== Pre-history of the locality ==
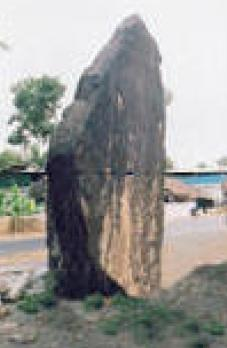
Ramavarmapuram menhir

Ramavarmapuram has a little known pre-history. The area must have been the site of human settlement in very ancient times. This is evidenced by the presence of a megalithic monument there. The monument is in granite and is of menhir type. Such monuments are very rare in Kerala. In fact, including Ramavarmapuram, there are only two places in Kerala where such monuments exist. The other place is Kuttoor also in Thrissur district. The monument in Ramavarmapuram is the larger of the two and measures 15 feet (4.6 m) in height and 12 feet 4 inches (3.76 m) in breadth. It is under the protection of Department of Archaeology since 1944. The monument is locally known as 'Padakkallu' or 'Pulachikkallu'.

These menhirs are memorials for the departed souls put up at burial sites. They belong to the Megalithic Age of Kerala, which is roughly estimated between 1000 BCE and 500 CE. All such monuments have not been dated exactly. Some experts are of the view that these are the remnants of the Neolithic Age in the development of human technology.

The Ramavarmapuram menhir is also believed to be a monument belonging to the Sangam period in the South Indian history.

== Terrain ==
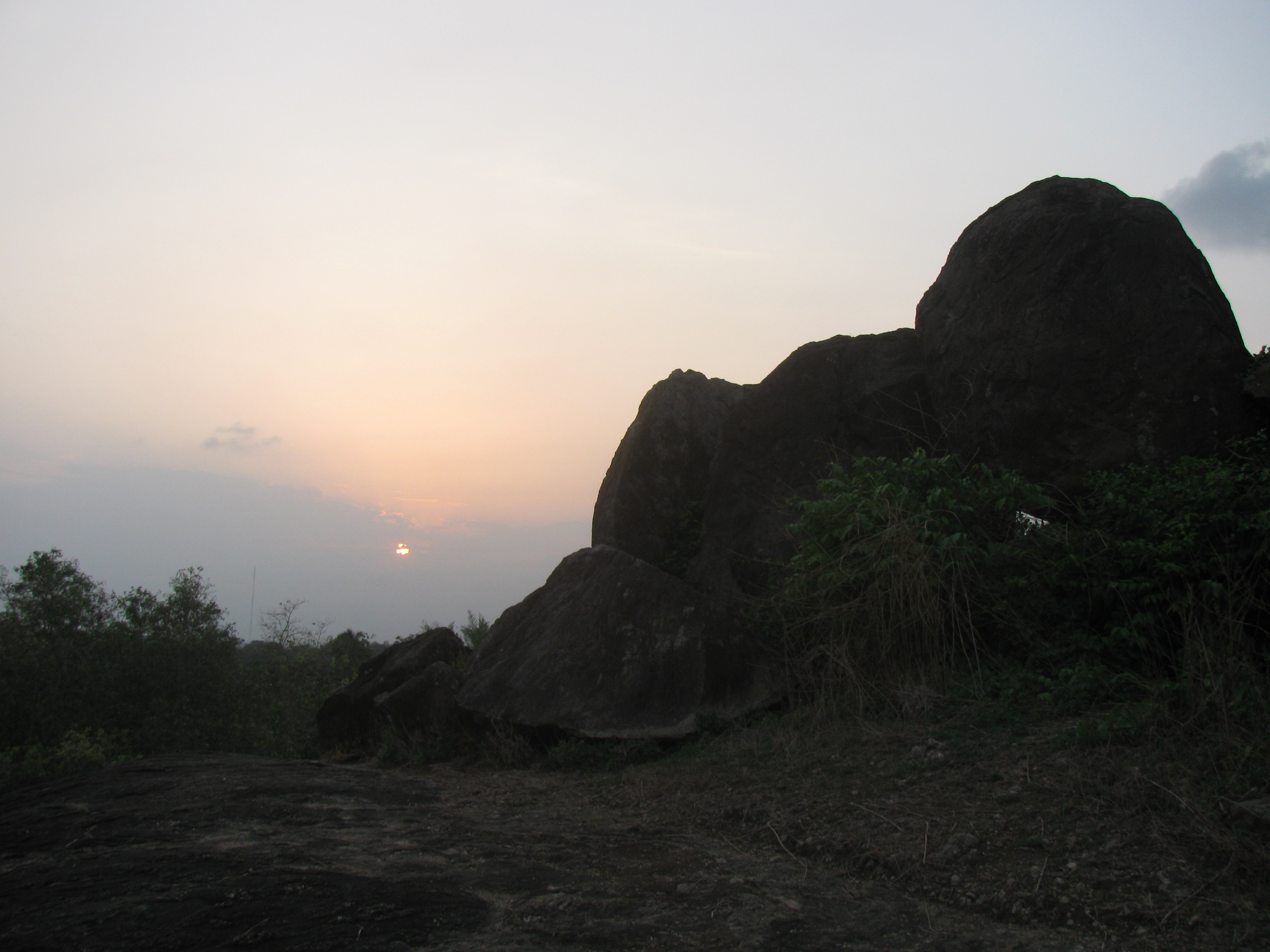
Sunset viewed from Elephant Rock in Ramavarmapuram

The nature of the terrain of region is reflected in the original name of the area. 'Anappara' is the place of the 'elephant rock', a place with a rock resembling the back of an elephant. (There are many places in Kerala named Anappara.) Ramavarmapuram area has extensive granite quarries supplying large quantities of construction aggregates in the form boulders, crushed stone and gravel to the building industry in Thrissur district.

A factory has been established in 2003 to produce dimension stones in granite. The tiles and slabs produced by the factory have a unique color christened 'Malabar green'.

== Church murals ==
There are around ten churches in Kerala having murals, all of them at least two centuries old. The renovated St. Francis Xavier's Church has 16 murals of incidents in the life of Jesus.

== Institutions in Ramavarmapuram ==
Ramavarmapuram has an unusual concentration of well-known establishments all connected to Kerala Police. These include one of the largest police training centres in India, south India's only police dog training centre and the headquarters of the Kerala Armed Police I Battalion. This has its origins in the separation of the then Cochin State Police into two divisions in the early 1930s and the stationing of the headquarters of one of the divisions in the present-day Ramavarmapuram.

== Institutions connected to Kerala Police ==
=== Headquarters of Kerala Armed Police I Battalion ===
The battalion was established by a Government order in 1972. A striking feature of this campus of Kerala Armed Police is the particular shape of its barracks: Three-storied Z- and L-shaped barracks all constructed by Rao Bahadur T S Narayana Iyyer, Dewan of Cochin in 1930s. The camp site is located in a 26-acre (110,000 m^{2}) campus. Retrieved 8 January 2009 This was the first such battalion to be formed in Kerala. Presently there are five such battalions.

The armed police battalions serve as reserve force to be deployed whenever and wherever the district police fall short of manpower in the maintenance of law and order. When so deployed, they function under the control of the district police officers and are returned to their camps as soon as the requirement is over. Unlike district police, they are not permitted to undertake crime investigation work. The battalions are maintained on the pattern of infantry battalions.

=== Kerala Police Academy ===
The Academy, spread over an area of 348 acres (1.4 km²), started functioning in May 2004. It is the main training centre of Kerala Police and is designed to have a capacity of training 1950 trainees at a time, which is one of the highest in India.

=== Police Dog Training Center ===
This is the only one such centre in South India. The first batch of dogs was passed out in October 2008. The centre is attached to Kerala Police Academy.

There are two types of dogs employed by Police: 'Tracker dogs' which track criminals and 'Sniffer dogs' which detects explosives, narcotics etc. The dog training centre can accommodate 30 dogs at a time and they can be trained in both tracking and sniffing operations.

=== Thrissur District Armed Reserve Police ===
The administrative blocks, residential quarters, parade grounds and other establishments connected with Thrissur District Armed Reserve Police are all located in Ramavarmapuram adjacent to the campus of Kerala Armed Police I Battalion.

After several mergers of the various wings of the law-enforcement agencies existing in the different parts of Kerala before independence, a force called State General Armed Reserve was formed in 1941. This was bifurcated in 1958 to form the Special Armed Police Battalion and the District Armed Reserve Police.

=== Kerala Fire and Rescue Services Academy ===
The academy started functioning in June 2007. There is a growing demand for trained fire fighting men in foreign countries. The Academy is designed to run rescue and fire fighting courses for able bodied youth. The Government has requested the Central Government to upgrade the Academy as a national centre for disaster management training.

=== Administrative Office of Thrissur City Police Commissioner ===
The Administrative Office of Thrissur City Police Commissioner is located in Ramavarmapuram. The Thrissur City Police Commissionerate was formed in March 2011 by bifurcating the then existing Thrissur police district into rural and urban. The administrative jurisdiction of the City Police Commissioner covers 12 police stations including a women's police station and a traffic station. These stations fall in three subdivisions, namely, Thrissur (comprising Thrissur East, Thrissur West and Ollur circles) and Guruvayur (comprising Peramangalam and Guruvayur circles). P. Vijayan is the first City Police Commissioner of Thrissur.

=== Civil Defence Training Institute ===
Kerala's first Civil Defence Training Institute is being set up in a campus spread over eight acres of land in Ramavarmapuram near Viyyur Central Jail. Oommen Chandy, Kerala Chief Minister, laid the foundation for the Institute on 30 June 2012. The Institute is intended to train ex-service men, home guards, NCC cadets and the general public to deal with disasters, including natural calamities.

== Educational institutions ==
=== State Institute of English, Kerala ===
The State Institute of English-Kerala is a state-level centre established by Government of Kerala and functioning in Ramavarmapuram to promote English language studies in Kerala. Though the Institute started functioning in May 2011, it was formally inaugurated by Kerala Education Minister P K Abdu Rabb only on 1 October 2011. It is an English Language Training Institute (ELTI) affiliated to English and Foreign Languages University (EFL University), Hyderabad. The Institute coordinates research and training activities in English language teaching by working in tandem with the District Centres for English at Thiruvananthapuram, Kollam, Thrissur and Kozhikode. The Institute's stress is on developing and delivering methodologies for improving communication skills of students by continued training of teachers. The training sessions in the Institute utilises technology-aided English language teaching methods.

=== Government Engineering College, Thrissur ===
Government Engineering College, Thrissur, is the second oldest engineering college in Kerala. It is also the first engineering college to be established after the formation of the State of Kerala. The college started functioning in the Chembukkavu (Thrissur) campus of Maharaja's Technological Institute in 1957. The classes were shifted to the present campus in October 1960 and the college was formally inaugurated in February 1962. The present college campus is spread over an area of 75 acres (300,000 m^{2}). The foundation stone of the college was laid by late Pandit Jawaharlal Nehru, the first Prime Minister of India, on 26 April 1958.

The land which is now under the control of Government Engineering College, Thrissur, was originally in the hands of Parukkutty Nethyar Amma (Malayalam : പാറുക്കുട്ടി നേത്യാര്‍ അമ്മ). She was the consort of Maharaja Rama Varma, who reigned as king of the princely state of Cochin from 1914 to 1932. After his demise in 1932 while staying in Madras (Chennai), Maharaja Rama Varma was popularly referred to as 'Madrassil Theepetta Thampuran'.

=== Vimala College, Thrissur ===
Prior to the de-linking of Pre-Degree Courses from the academic control of the universities, Vimala College was the only women's college in Kerala which offered exclusively graduate and post-graduate programmes. The college was presented the R Shankar Award in 2002 by the Government of Kerala for the best college in Kerala. It has been accredited with five star rating by the National Assessment and Accreditation Council, Bangalore.

=== District Institute for Education and Training (DIET) ===
As part of the National Education Policy (1986), DIETs were established in selected districts all over India in 1986. The institute in Ramavarmapuram was also established at that time. The institute is managed by the Government of Kerala with financial assistance from the Government of India. The aim of this institute is to provide academic and resource support at district level for the success of various programs being undertaken in the field of primary and adult education. The physical infrastructure now being used by the DIET in Ramavarmapuram was in the hands of the Institute of Primary Education an institution which became defunct consequent on the establishment of DIET. The Institute of Primary Education had been functioning in Ramavarmapuram since 1970.

=== Government Hindi Teachers Training Institute ===
The institute under the control of Department of General Education, Government of Kerala, is conducting a course leading to the award of Diploma in Language Education (Hindi) (D L Ed (Hindi)) which is equivalent to BEd (Hindi). There are only two other such institutes in Kerala: Government Regional Institute of Language Training, Thiruvananthapuram and Institute of Language Teacher Education run by Bharath Hindi Prachara Kendram, Adoor.

=== District Centre of English ===
The Centre was established under a scheme sponsored by the Ministry of Human Resource Development, Govt of India and implemented by the Central Institute of English and Foreign Languages, Hyderabad with the support of the State Council of Education Research and Training. The scheme provides an opportunity to all teachers of English in a district to familiarise with modern methods and techniques of teaching English. The scheme is also intended to initiate the teachers into a path of self-development, to improve the standard of English among the learners and to develop a collaborative work culture among teachers.

=== Govt Vocational Higher Secondary School ===
The oldest educational establishment in the area is the Govt Vocational Higher Secondary School which was started off as an Upper Primary School in 1939. The High School was started in 1960 and was upgraded to its present form in 1984. The School offers vocational courses in plant protection, nursery management and ornamental gardening, maintenance and repairs of TV and radio, and maintenance and repairs of domestic appliances. Distinguished Malayalam poets G Sankara Kurup, Vailoppilly Sreedhara Menon and Mullanezhy Neelakandan had served this school as teachers.

=== Kendriya Vidyalaya ===
A Kendriya Vidyalaya (Central School) has started functioning in the premises of Kerala Police Academy in Ramavarmapuram from 30 August 2010. This is the second Kendriya Vidyalaya in Thrissur District. The other one is located at Puranattukara and it was established in 1985. There are a total of 39 Kendriya Vidyalayas in Kerala under the Ernakulam Region of the Kendriya Vidyalaya Sangathan.

== Welfare homes ==
=== Asha Bhavan ===
Asha Bhavans are institutions run by the Social Welfare Department of Govt of Kerala and they are meant for the care and protection of women who have been cured of their mental illness and who have no one to take protection of. There are three such institutions in Kerala one of which is in Ramavarmapuram. Asha Bhavans at Thiruvananthapuram and Kozhikode accommodate women above the age of 13 years and Asha Bhavan at Thrissur admits women above the age of 15 years.

=== Mahilamandiram ===
This Home provides shelter to widows, deserted women, divorced women and destitute women who have nobody to look after and who are of age above 13 years. Children coming with mothers are allowed to stay with them up to the age of six years. Every district in Kerala, except Idukki and Wayanad, has such a home. Mahilamandirams are also managed by the Social Welfare Department of Govt of Kerala

=== Vridha Mandiram ===
Vridha Mandiram (home for the elderly) is also run by the Social Welfare department of Govt of Kerala. The Mandiram was established in 1998. It admits as inmate any person of age above 55 years who have no one to take care of. There are facilities for a maximum of 100 inmates.

== Other institutions ==
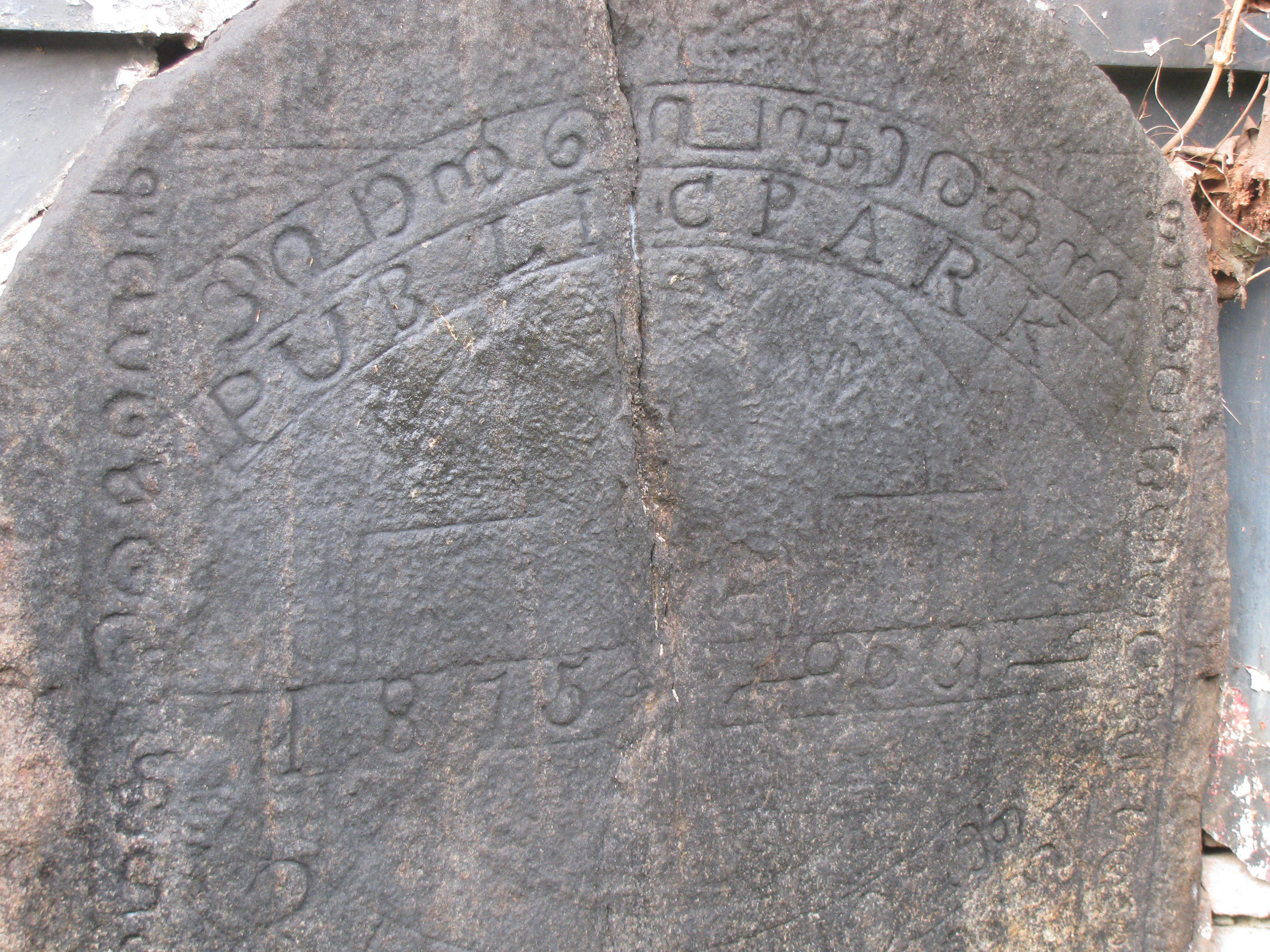
Foundation Stone of Viyyur Park, 1875 CE

=== Broadcasting Station of All India Radio ===
The transmitter of the Thrissur station of All India Radio was commissioned on 4 November 1956. The station started independent broadcasting in 1974.

=== Doordarshan Studio ===
There are only two studios in Kerala. The other one is located in Thiruvananthapuram. A low power transmitter of Doordardashan is also located near the studio.

=== Central Prison, Viyyur ===
The central jail was established in Viyyur in 1914. Prior to the establishment of the jail, the site was known as Viyyur Park. The Park housed the museum, zoo and botanical gardens which were all started in 1885. These were shifted to their present location in Chembukavu in 1914. There is also a Sub-Jail adjacent to Central Prison.

=== Government Children's Home ===
An institution established by Government of Kerala to rehabilitate children below 18 years of age who are in need of care and protection under Juvenile Justice Act 2000. Shelter, food, education, medical care, developmental opportunities and exposure for socialization/mainstreaming are the services provided in Juvenile Homes. There are 8 such institutions Kerala.

=== Child Welfare Committee Thrissur ===
As per the provisions of the Juvenile Justice (Care and Protection of Children) Act 2000 (amended in 2006) State governments are required to establish a Child Welfare Committee (CWC) or two in ever district. Each CWC should consist of a chairperson and four members. The chairperson should be a person well versed in child welfare issues and at least one member of the board should be a woman. The CWC has the same powers as a metropolitan magistrate or a judicial magistrate of the first class. A child can be brought before the committee (or a member of the committee if necessary) by a police officer, any public servant, CHILDLINE personnel, any social worker or public spirited citizen, or by the child himself/herself. CWC Thrissur is in Govt.Children's Home, Ramavarmapuram.

=== Indian Medical Association (IMA) Blood Bank ===
The IMA Blood Bank Complex and Research Centre at Ramavarmapuram is a joint project of Indian Medical Association (IMA), Thrissur and the District Panchayat, Thrissur under People’s Plan Programme. A registered charitable society called Janakeeya Samithy (Arogyam), Thrissur manages the center. The centre provides subsidised services to the economically disadvantaged sections of the population in the districts of Thrissur, Palakkad and Malappuram in central Kerala. The Complex was inaugurated in October 2004.

The center was adjudged as the Best Blood Bank in Kerala by Kerala State AIDS Control Society in 2008.

=== MILMA Dairy ===
One of the eleven dairies of Kerala Co-operative Milk Marketing Federation (known by the trade name Milma) is in Ramavarmapuram. This dairy has an attached training centre with hostel facility, the only such training centre in Kerala.

== Vigyan Sagar : S&T Park ==
Ramavarmapuram has been chosen as the site of a modern planetarium and a science and technology park to be constructed under the auspices of Thrissur District Panchayath. The project christened Vigyan Sagar is expected to cost Rupees twenty crores. The State Government has allocated 3.6 hectares of land, on the compound of the District Institute for Education and Training for setting up the planetarium and park.

== Other places named Ramavarmapuram ==
- A village in Palakkad District in Kerala is named Ramavarmapuram Pudur (PIN:678555)
- A locality in Thiruvananthapuram City is called Ramavarmapuram.
- An area of Nagercoil Town in Tamil Nadu is known as Ramavarmapuram.
- The original name of the public market of Koothattukulam founded during the time of His Royal Highness Sree Moolam Thirunal Maharaja of Travancore is Sree Ramavarmapuram Market.
- A marketplace near Neeravil, Perinad in Kollam district in Kerala is known as Sree Ramavarmapuram Market.

== Image gallery ==
Images of some of the important institutions located in Ramavarmapuram (31 images)

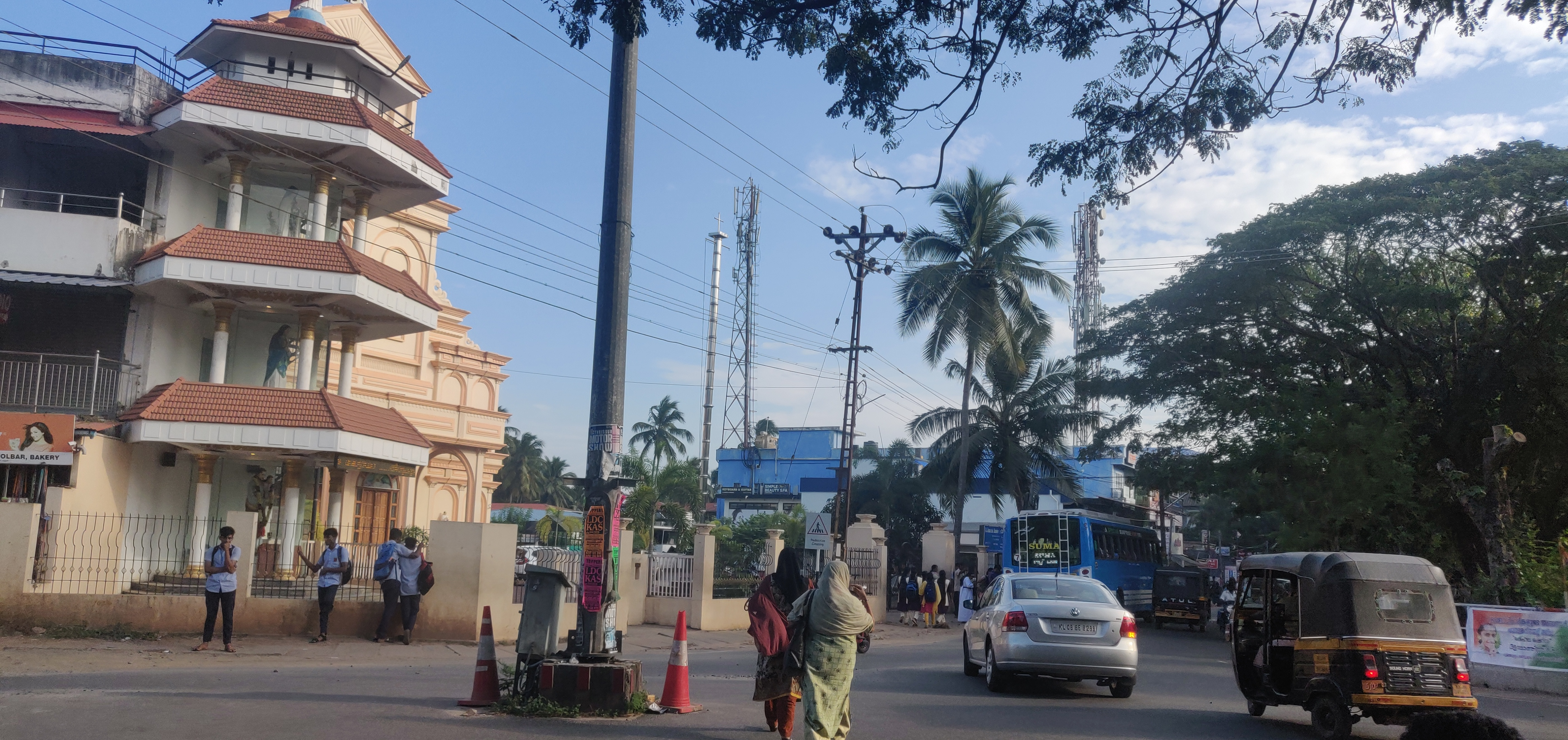
1. Pallimoola (Church Corner), the main road cross in Ramavarmapuram

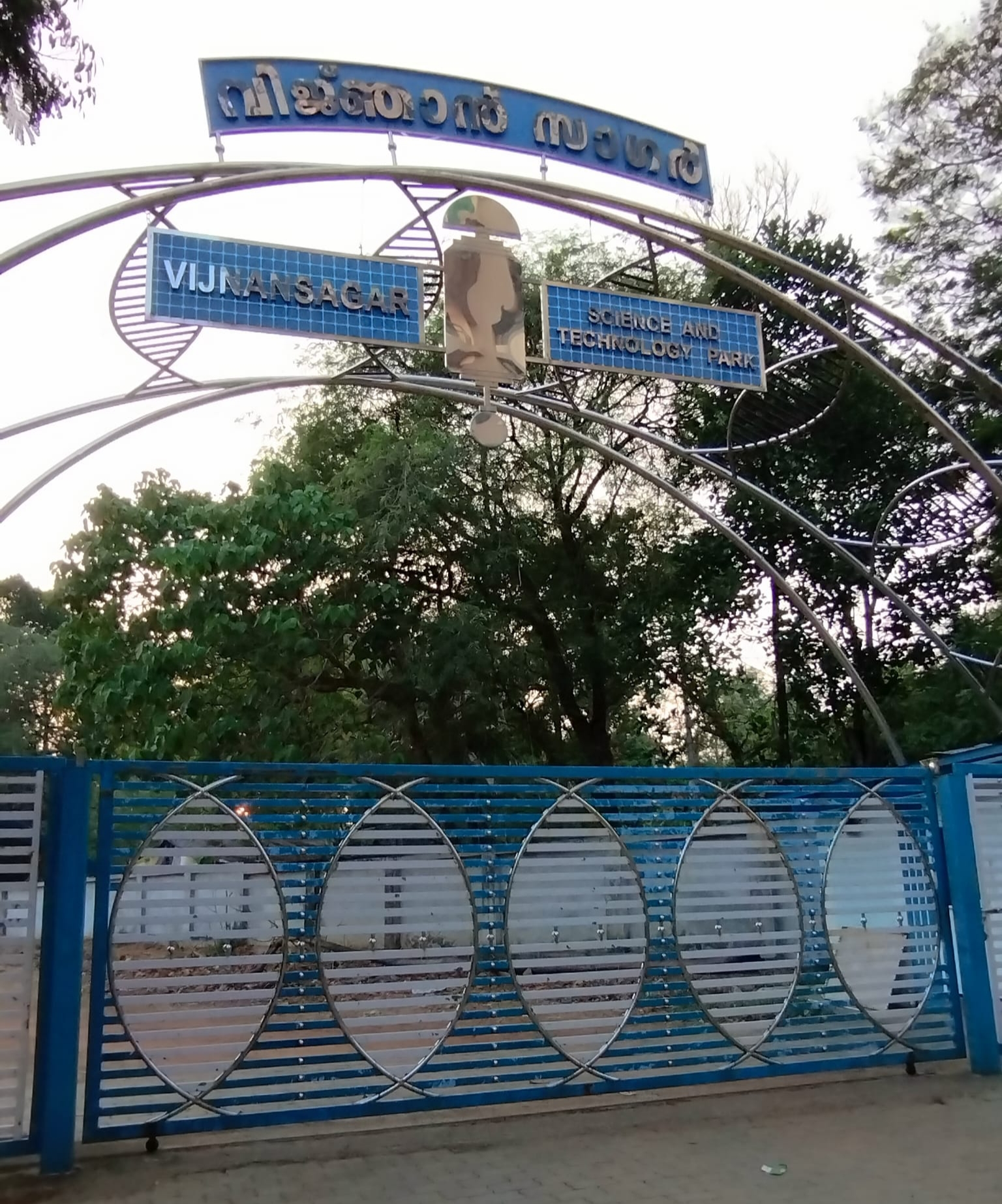
2. Entrance to Vijnan Sagar

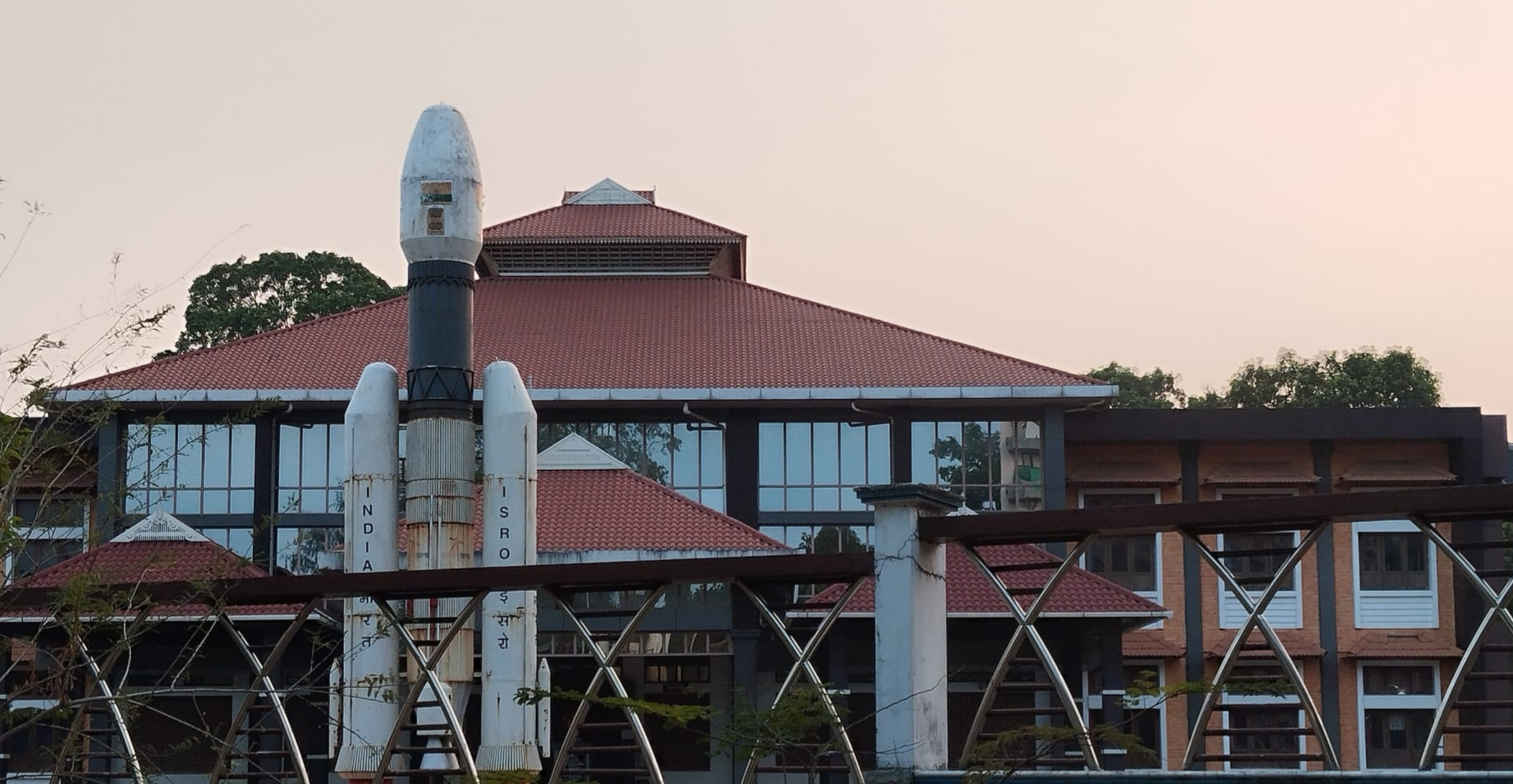
3. Main building of Vijnan Sagar

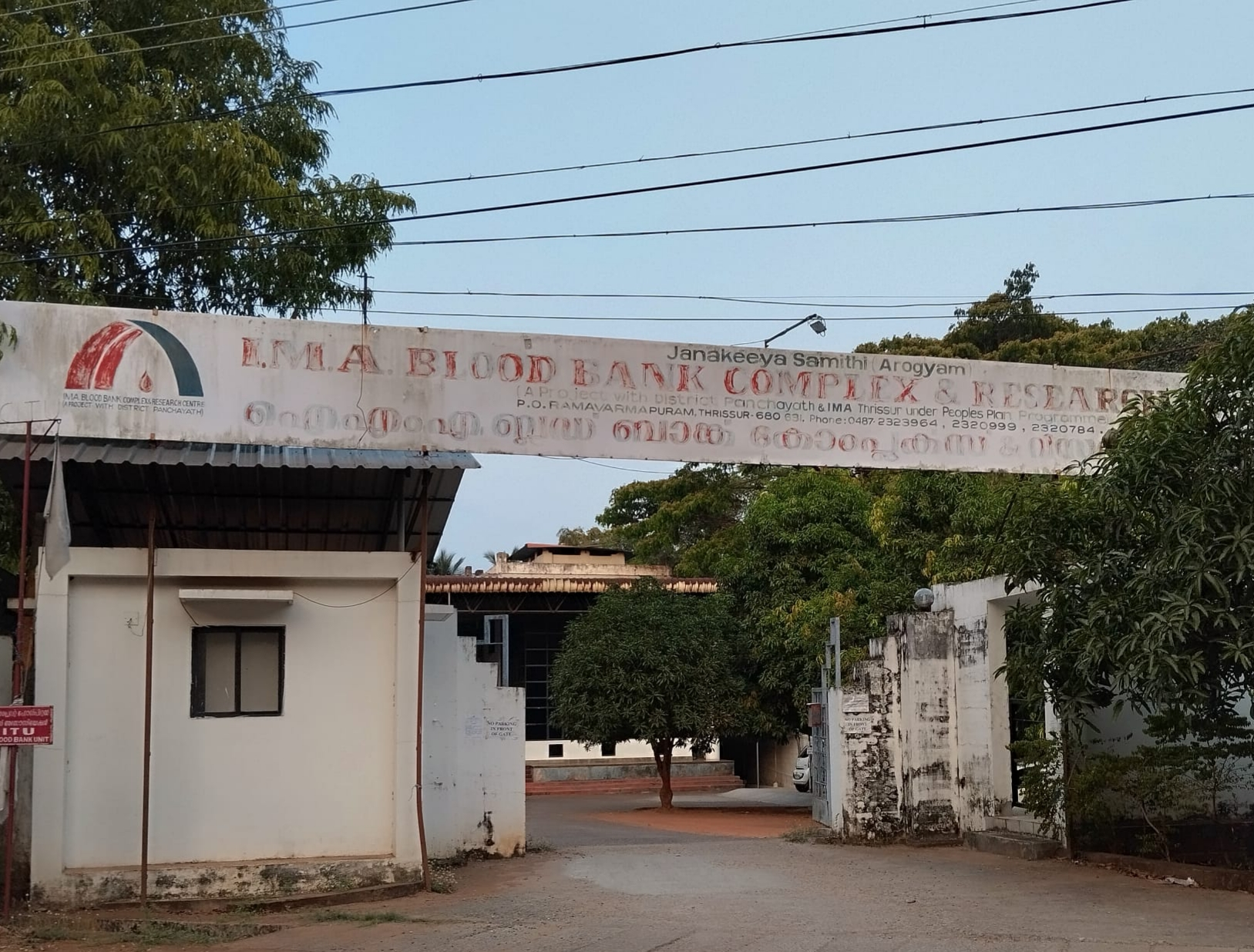
4. IMA Blood Bank Complex

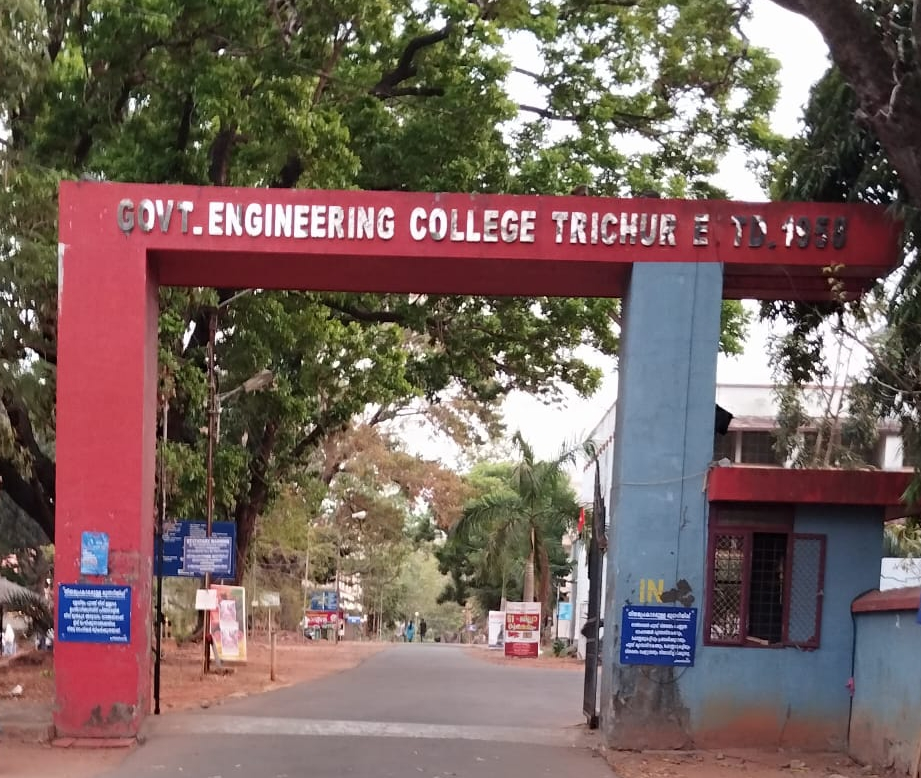
5. Govt Engineering College Entrance

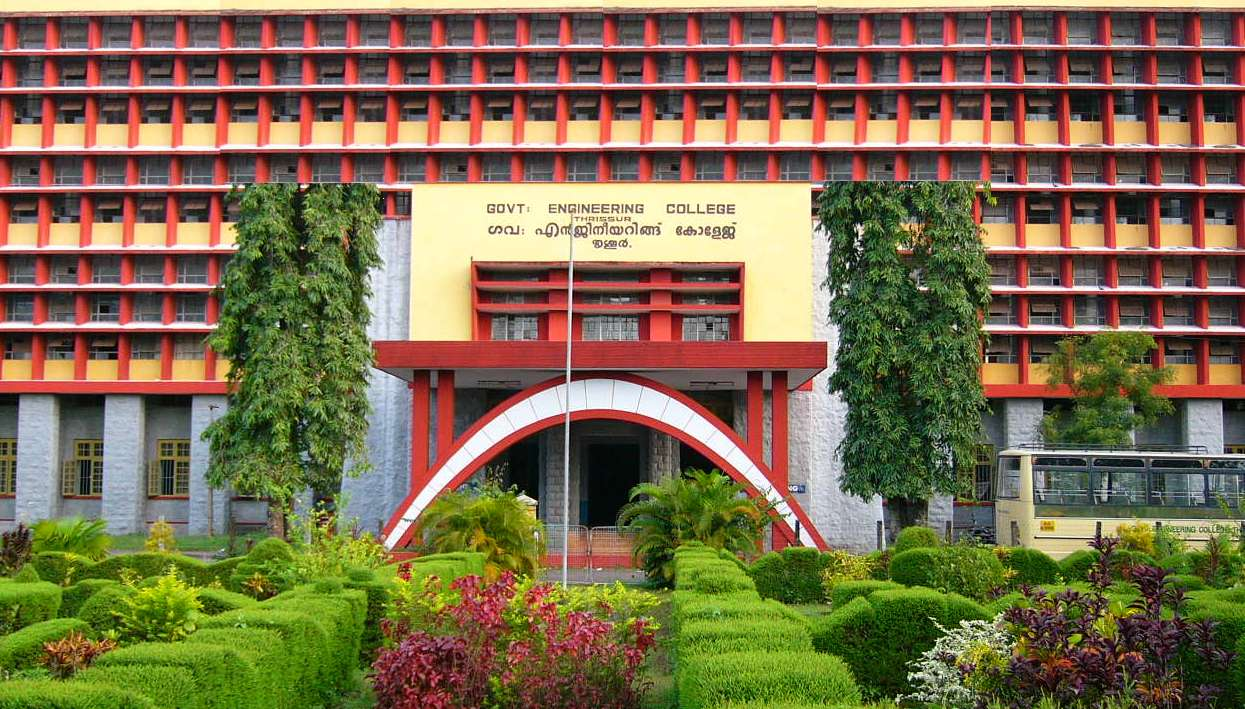
6. The main block of Govt Engineering College, Thrissur

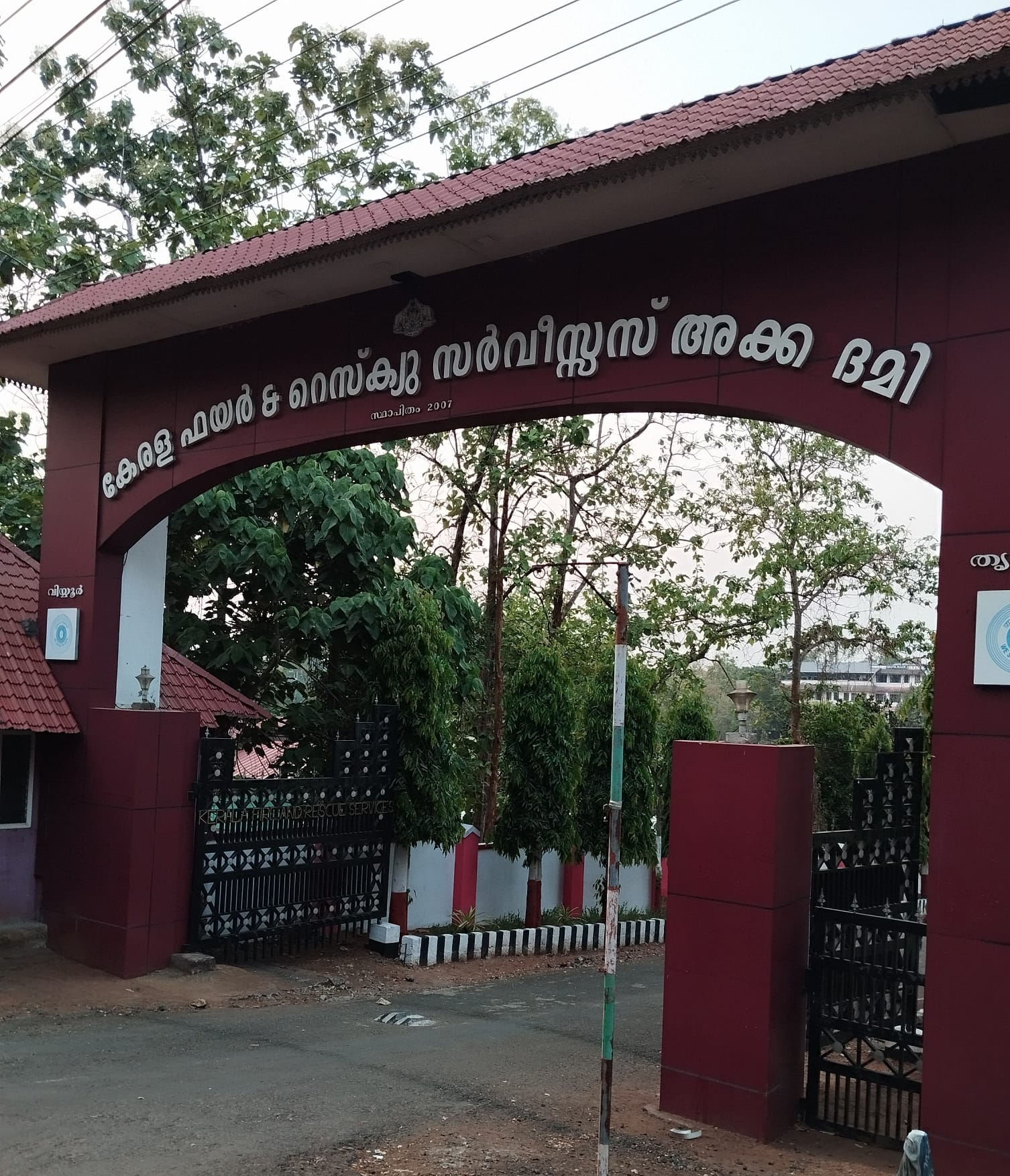
7. Kerala Fire & Rescue Services Academy

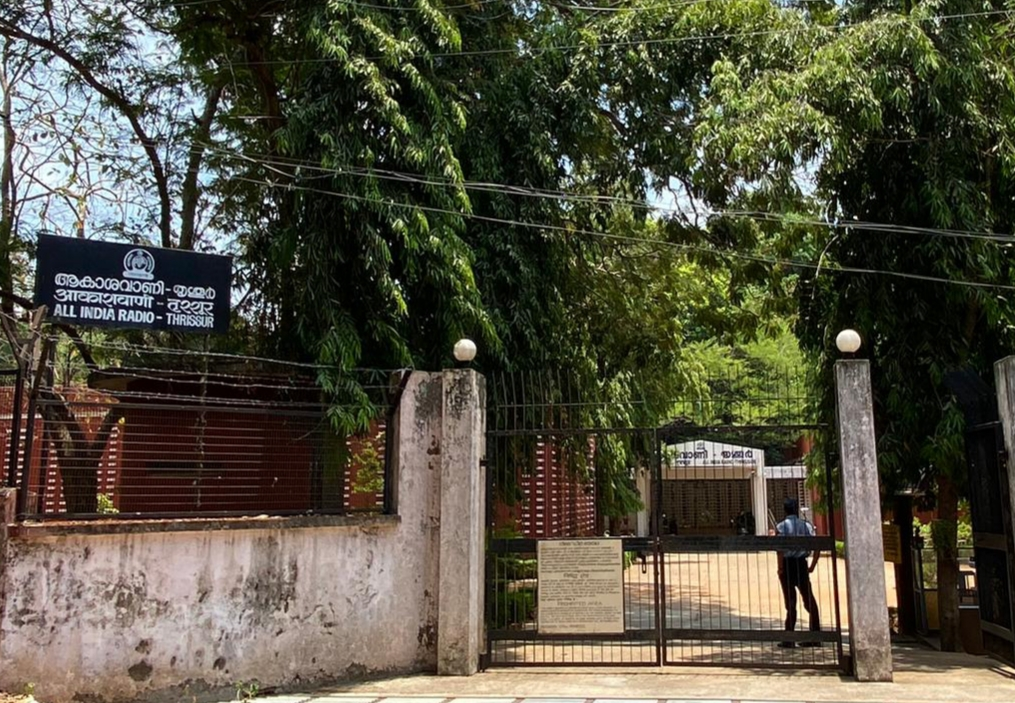
8. All India Radio, Thrissur Station

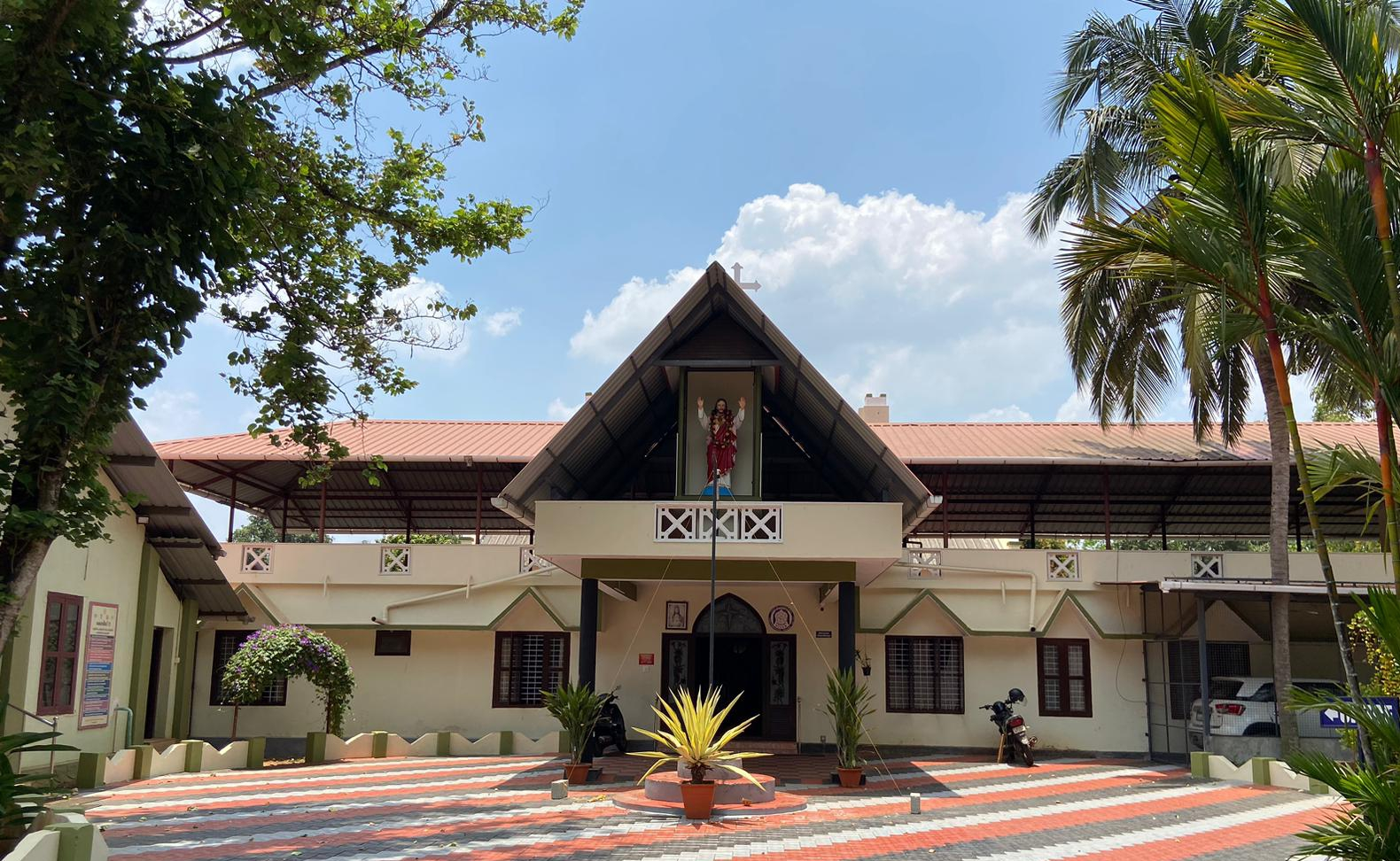
9. Christ Villa Poor Home

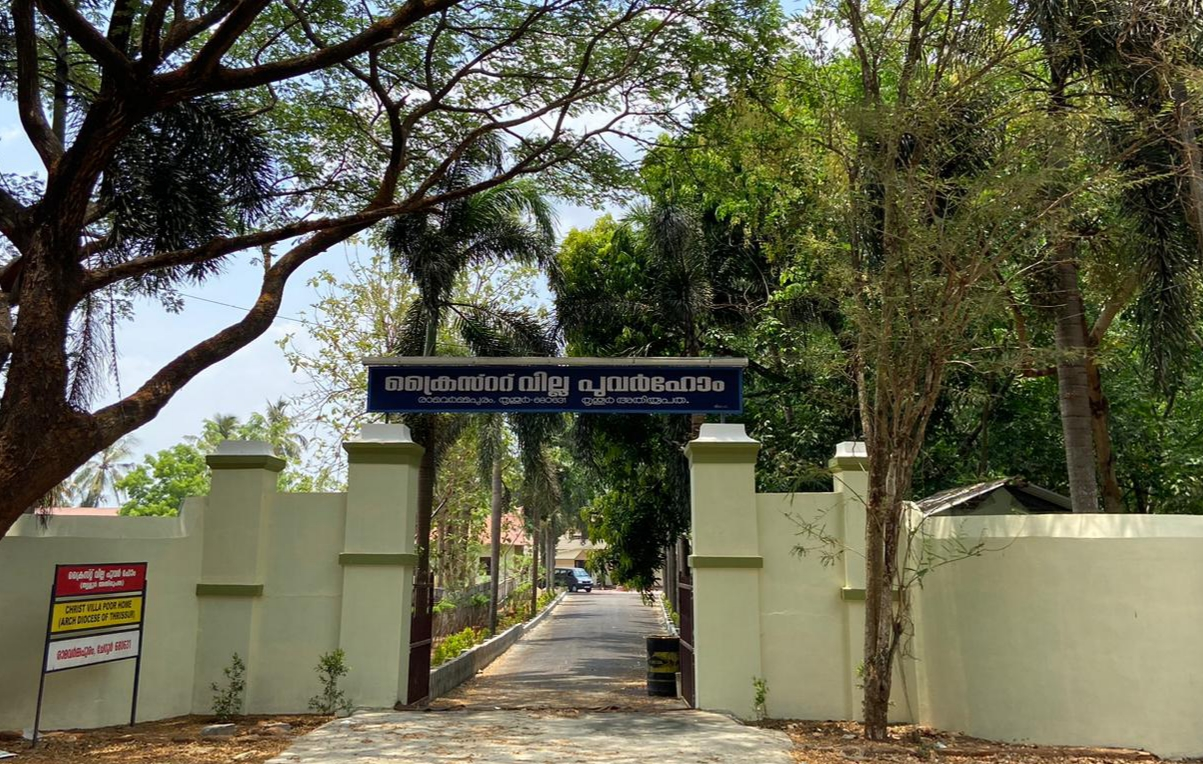
10. Entrance to Christ Villa Poor Home

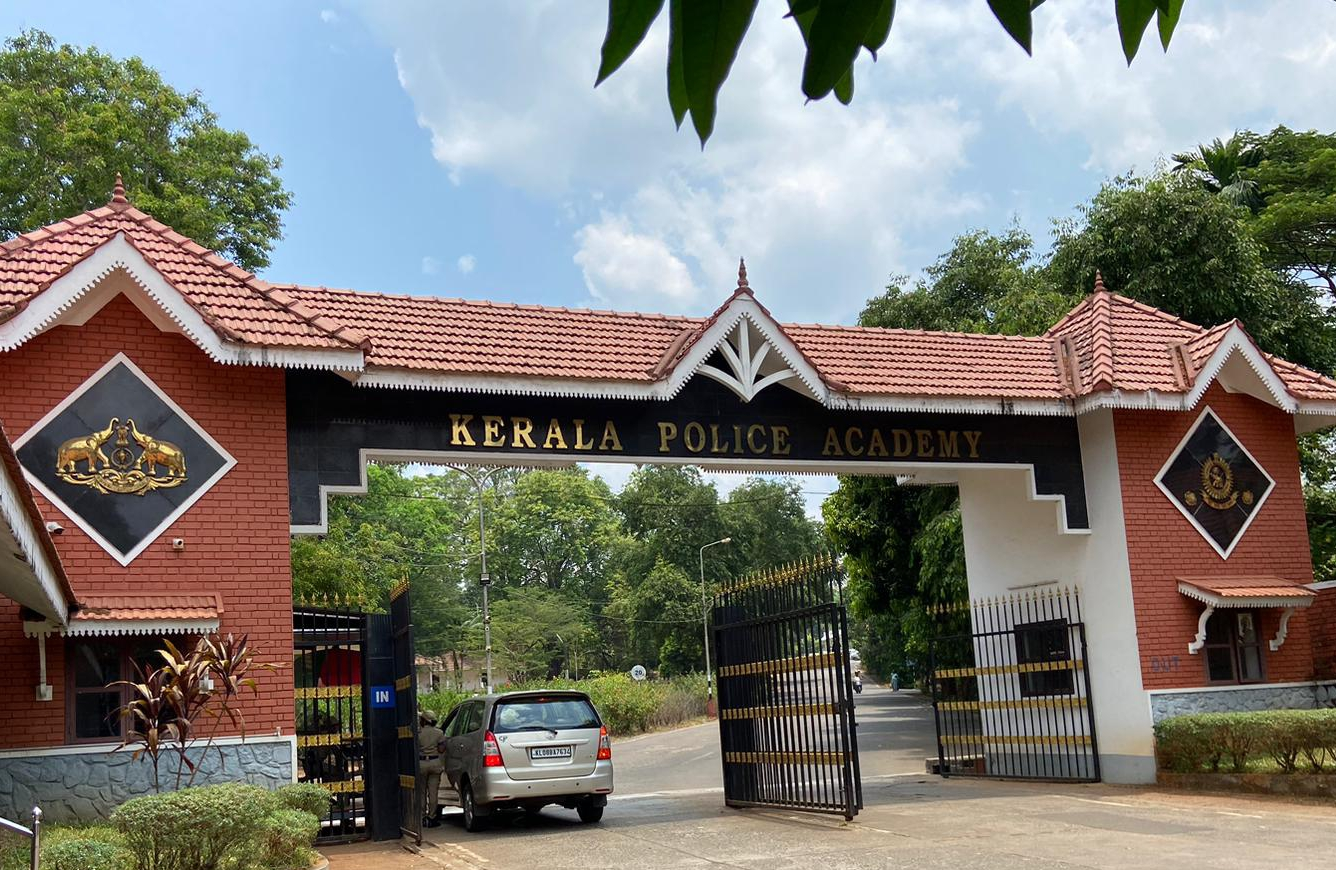
11. Kerala Police Academy

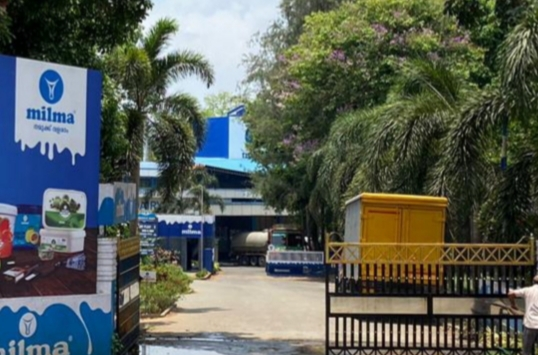
12. Milma Dairy, Thrissur

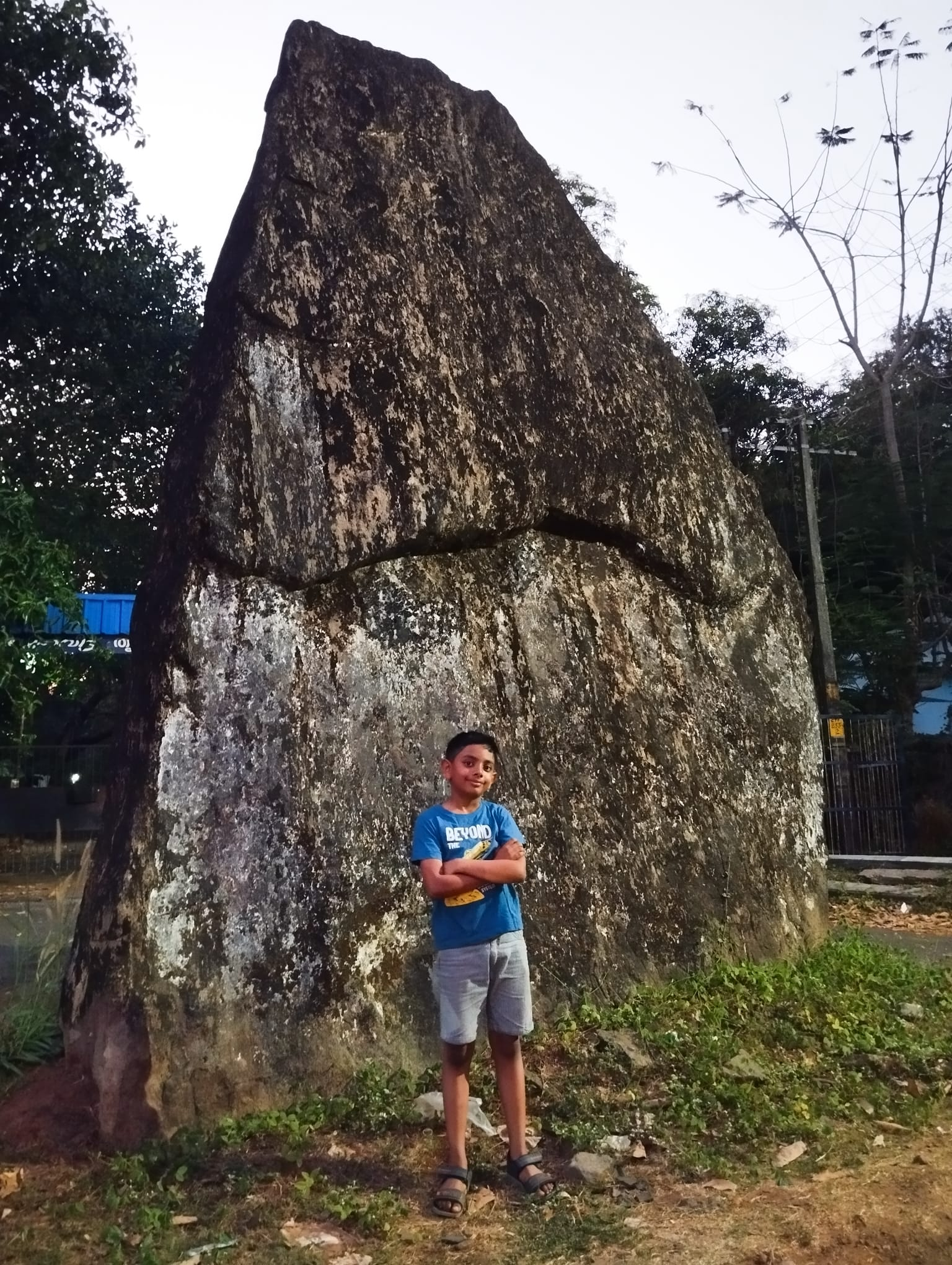
13. Ramavarmapuram menhir

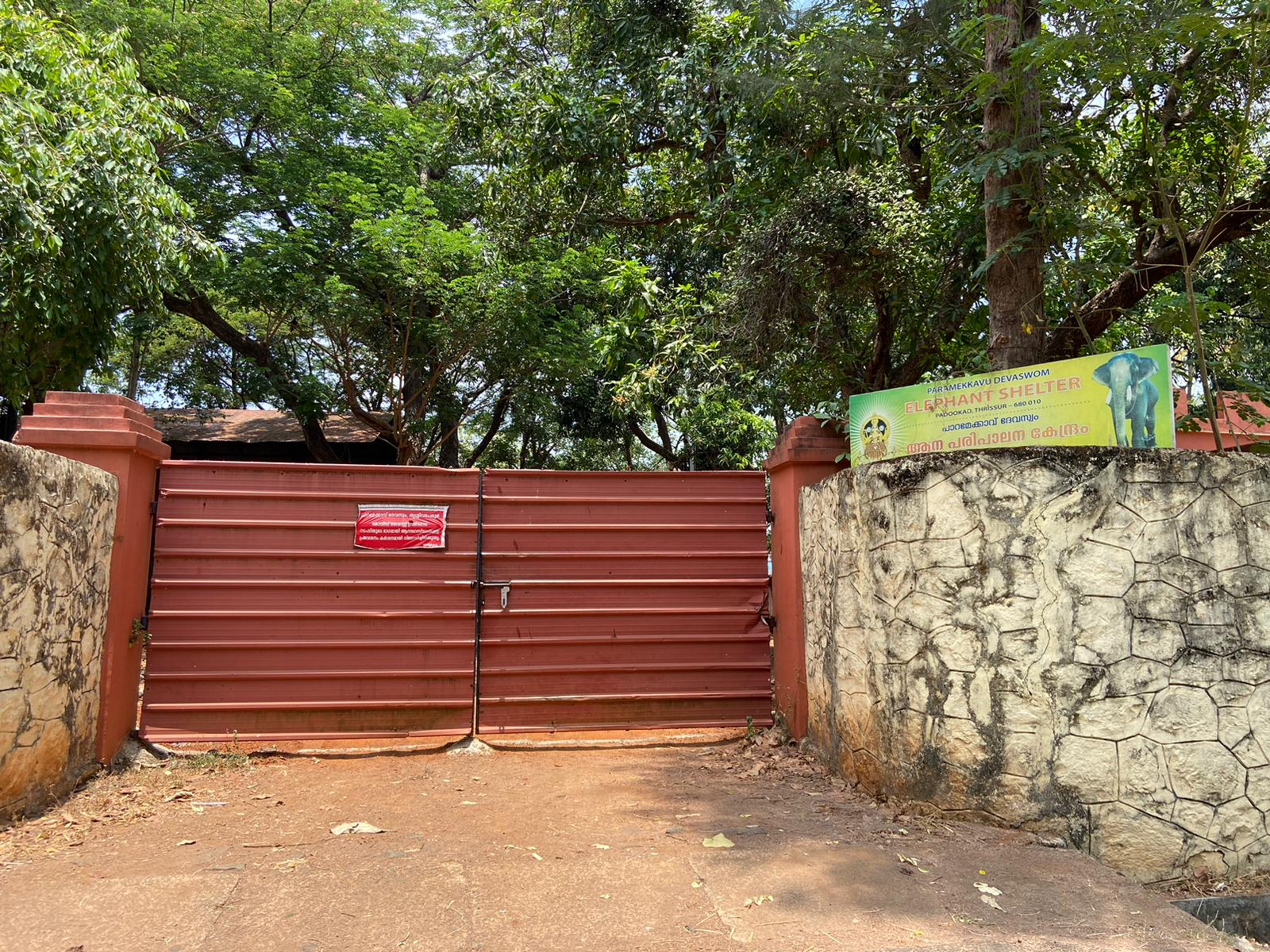
14. Elephant Shelter operated by Paramekkavu Devaswom, Thrissur

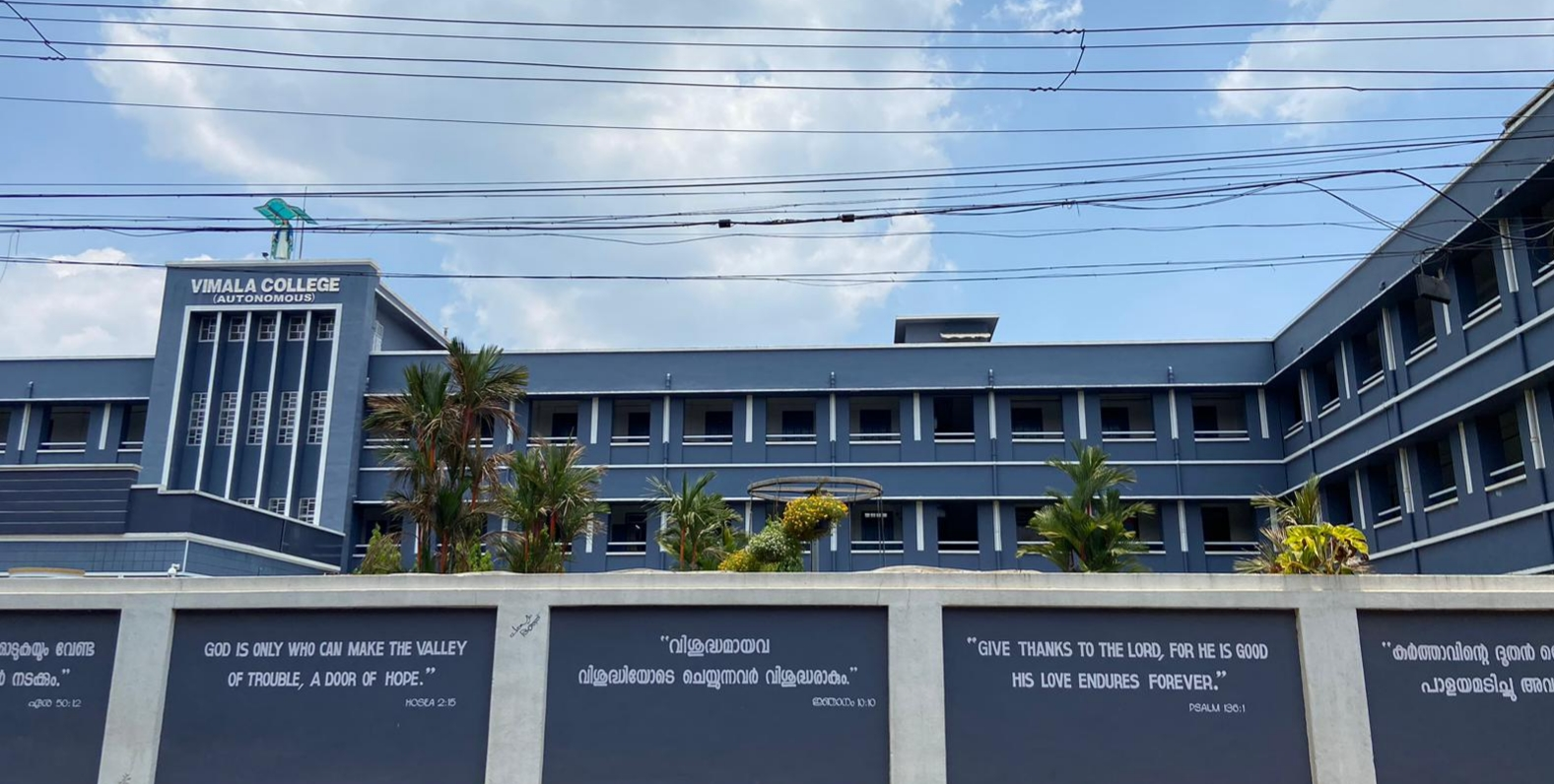
15. Vimala College, Thrissur

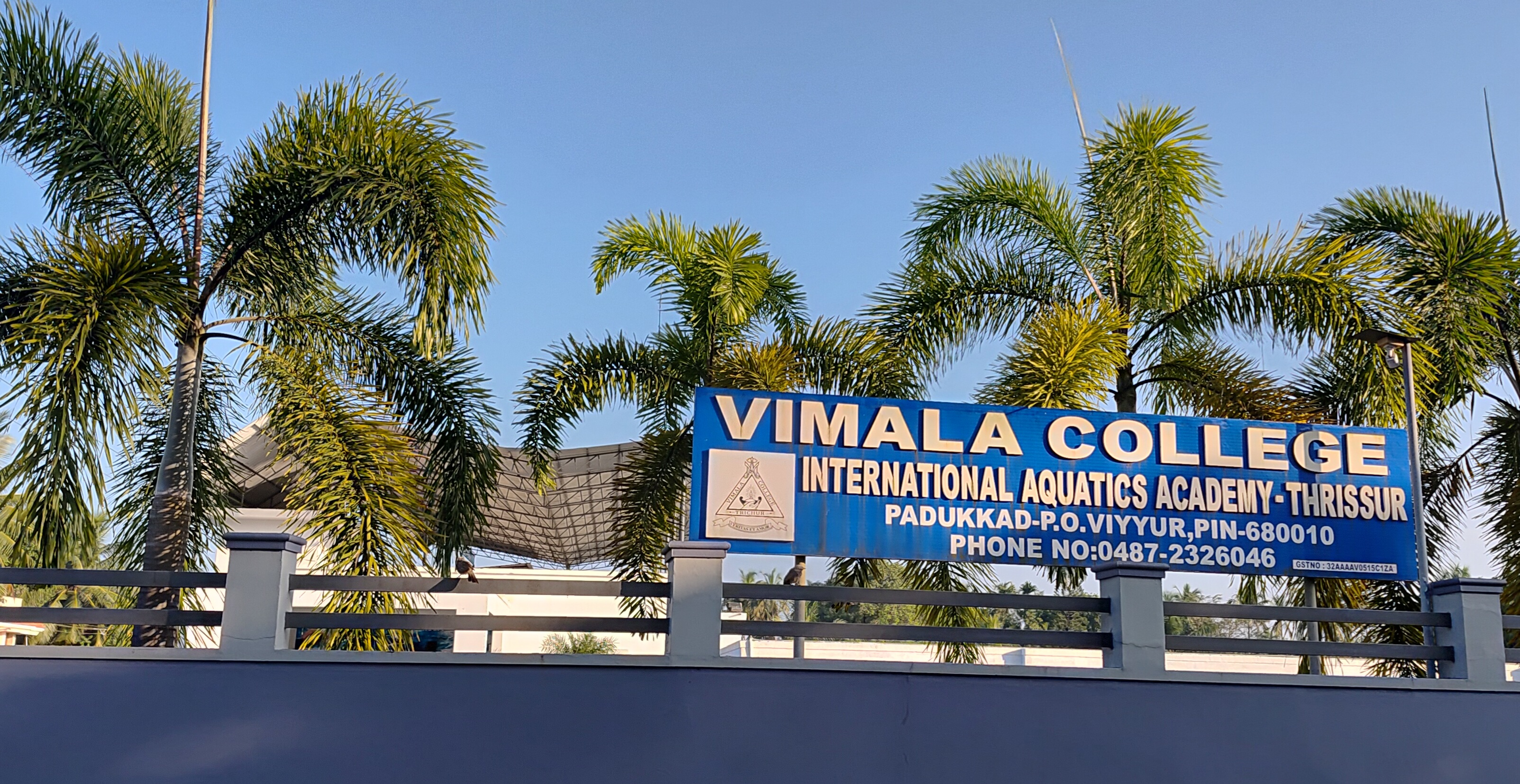
16. Vimala College International Aquatics Academy

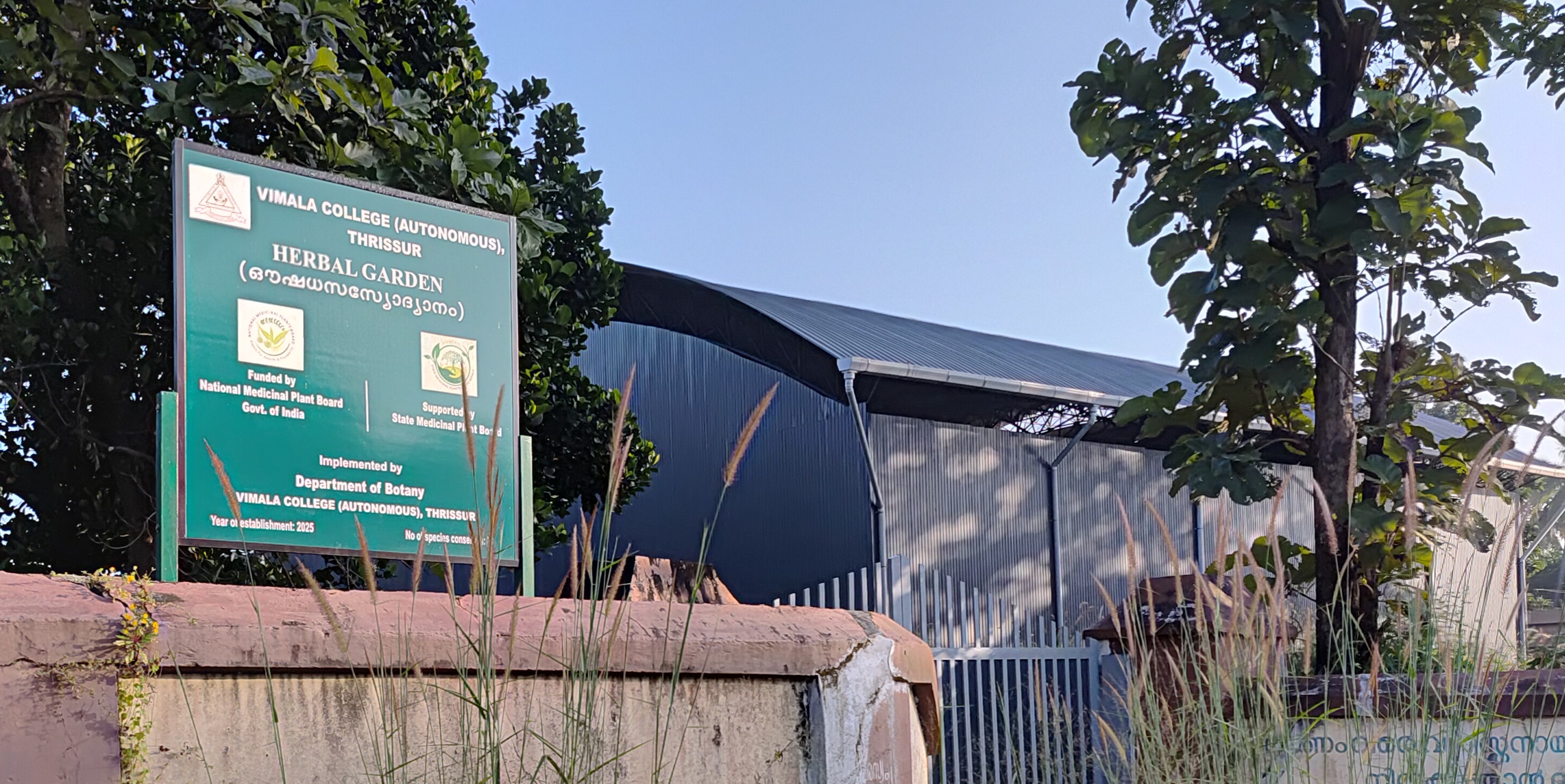
17. Vimala College Herbal Garden, funded by National Medicinal Plants Board, Govt of India

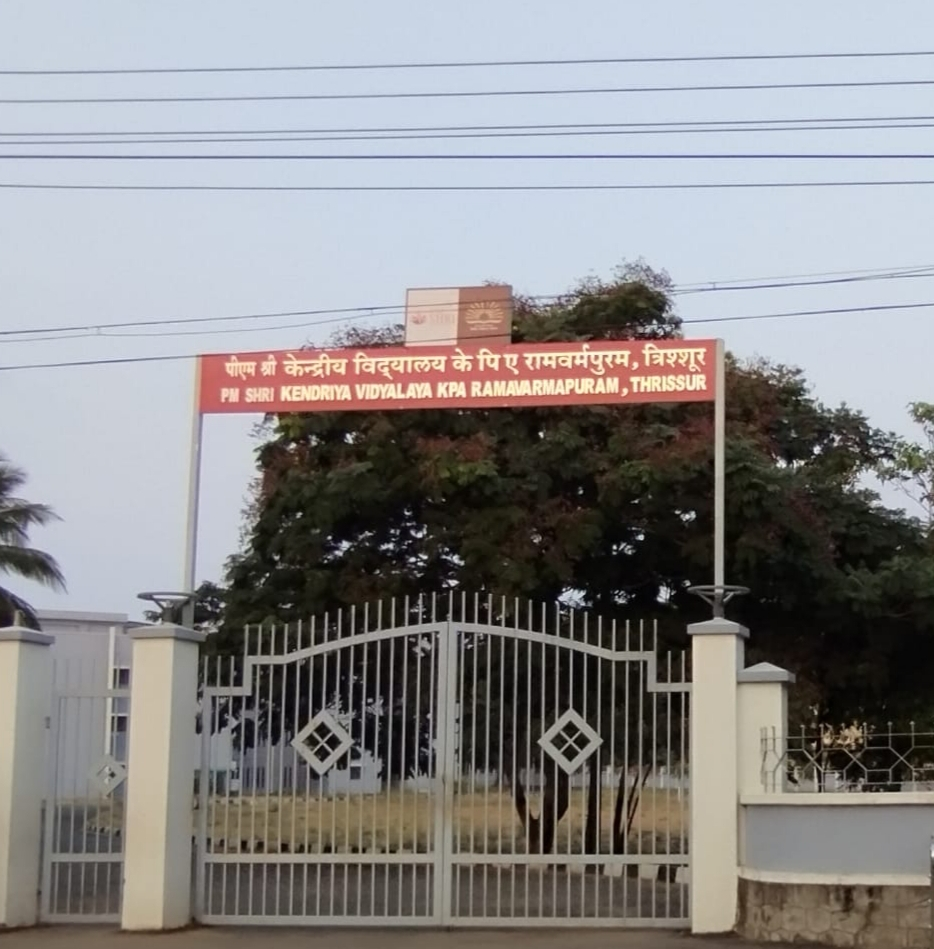
18. PM Shri Kendriya Vidyalaya, KPA Ramavarmapuram, Thrissur

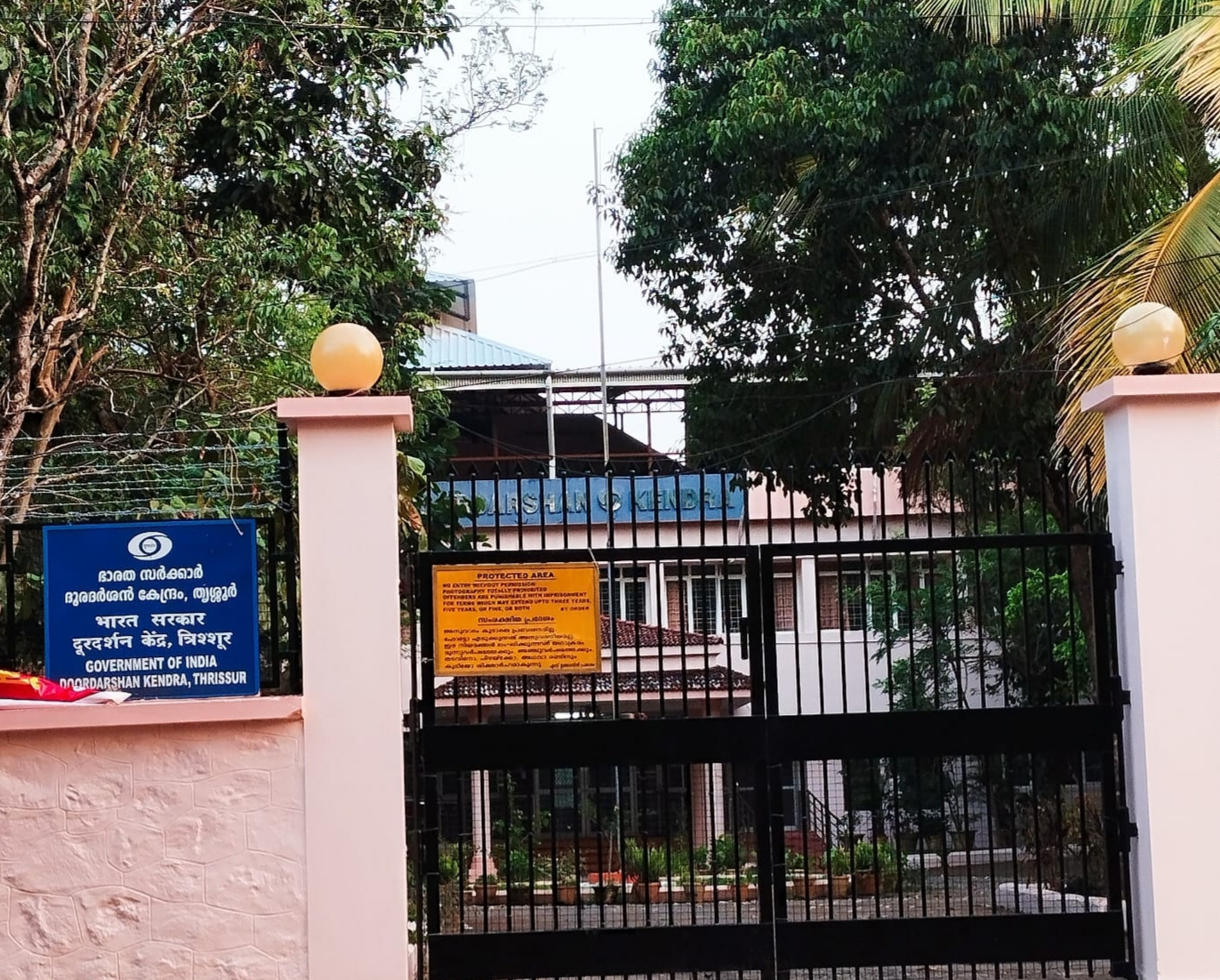
19. Doordarshan Kendra, Thrissur

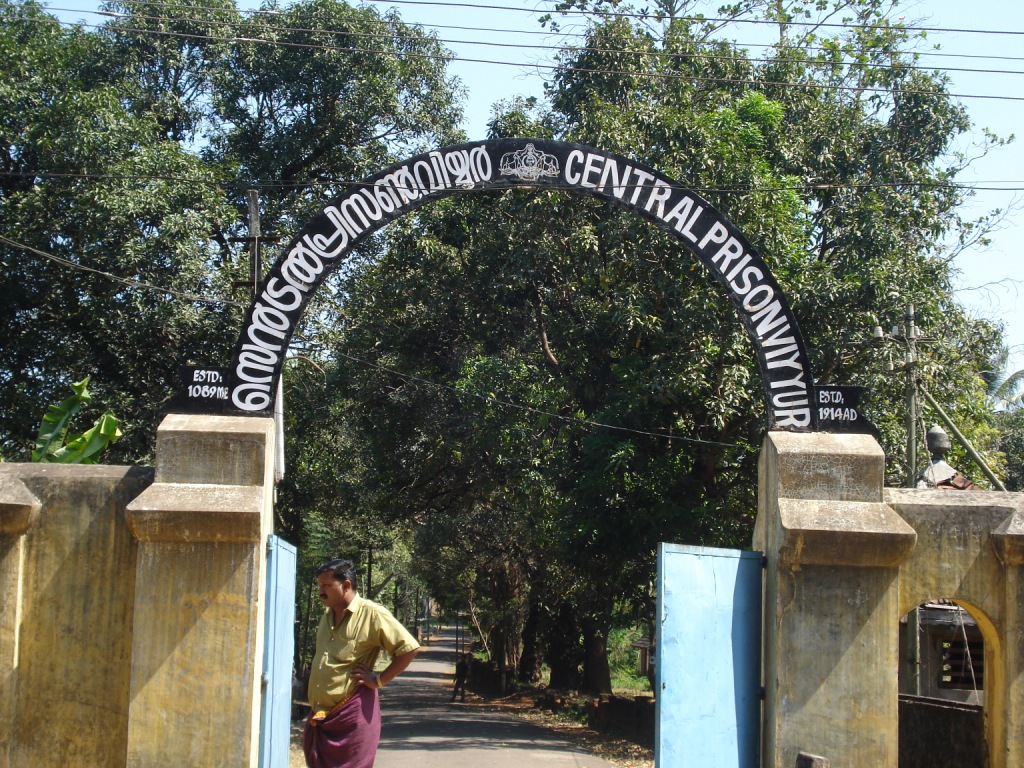
20. Central Prison, Viyyur

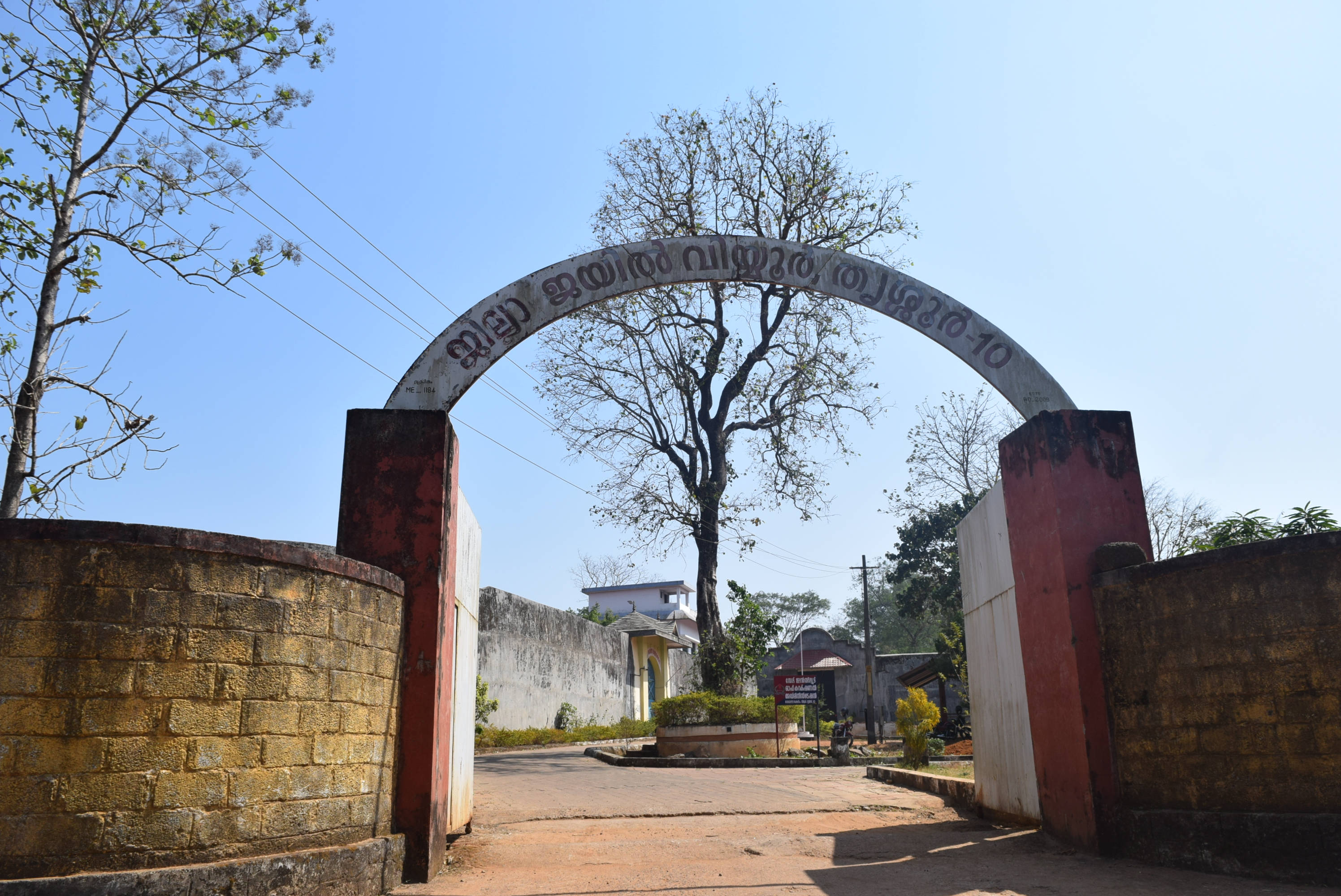
21. District Jail, Thrissur

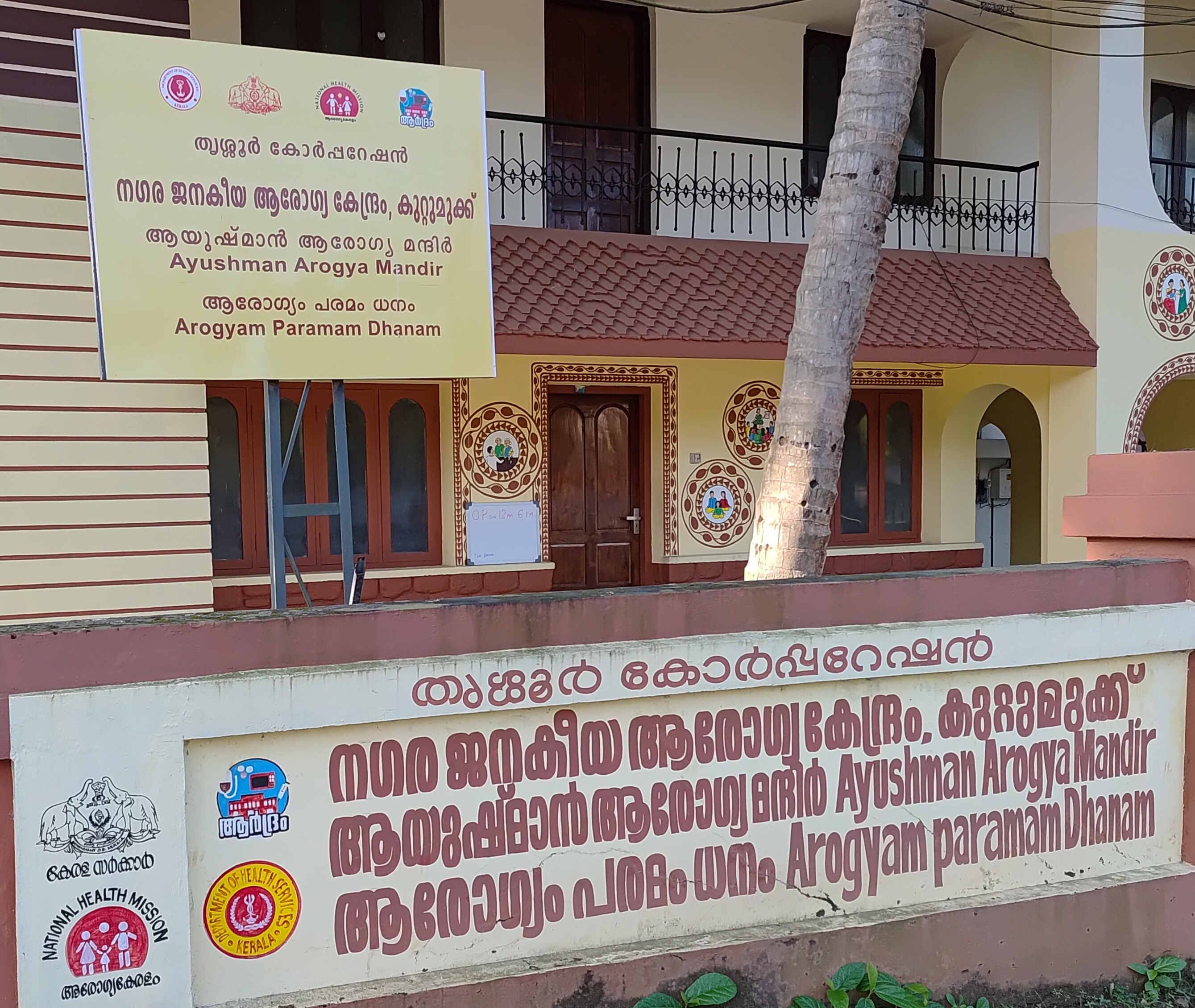
22. Urban Health and Wellness Centre (Ayushman Arogya Mandir) of Kuttumukku Division of Thrissur Corporation, located in Ramavarmapuram

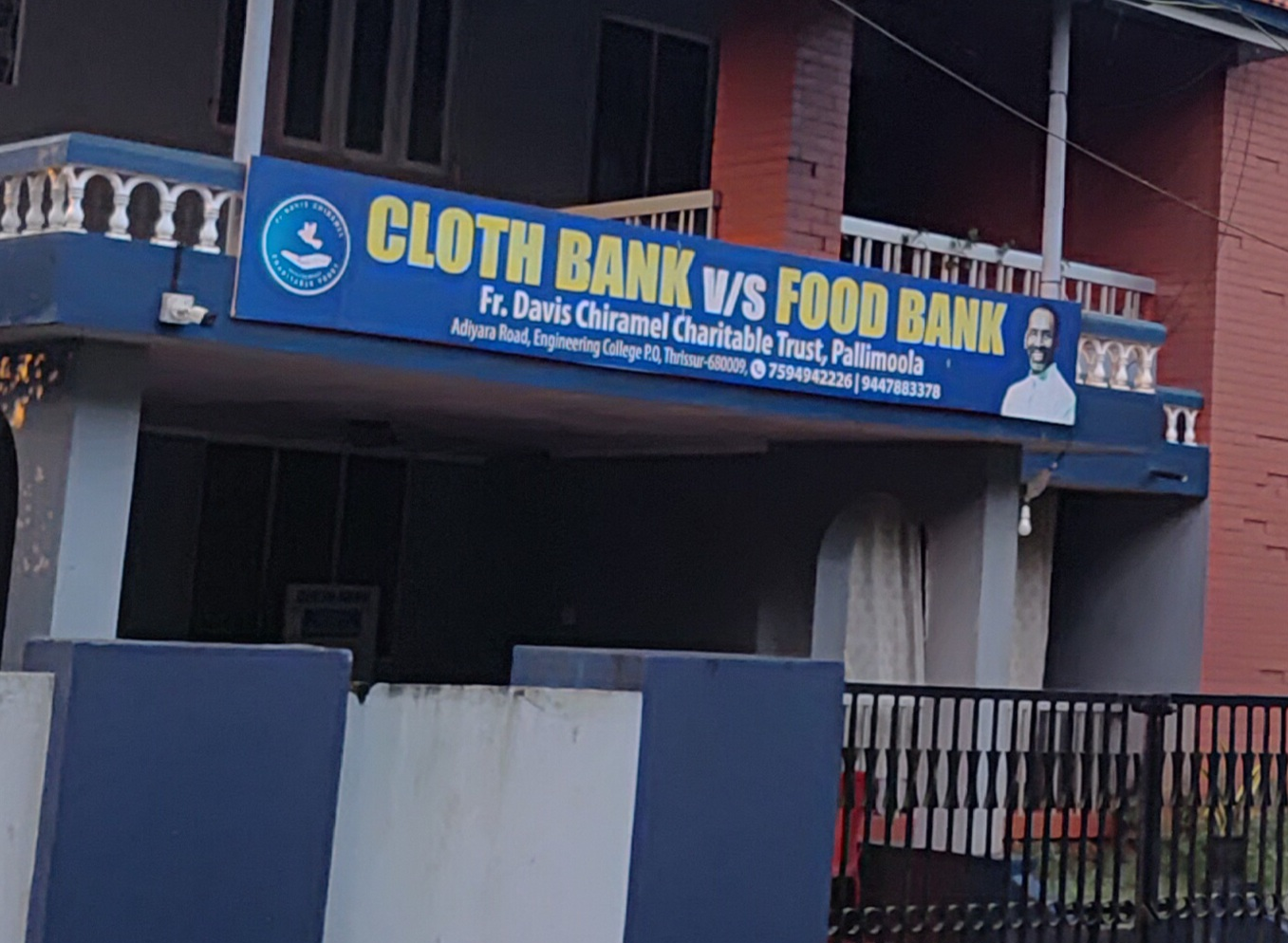
23. Cloth Bank vs Food Bank located in Ramavarmapuram, an initiative of Fr. Davis chiramel

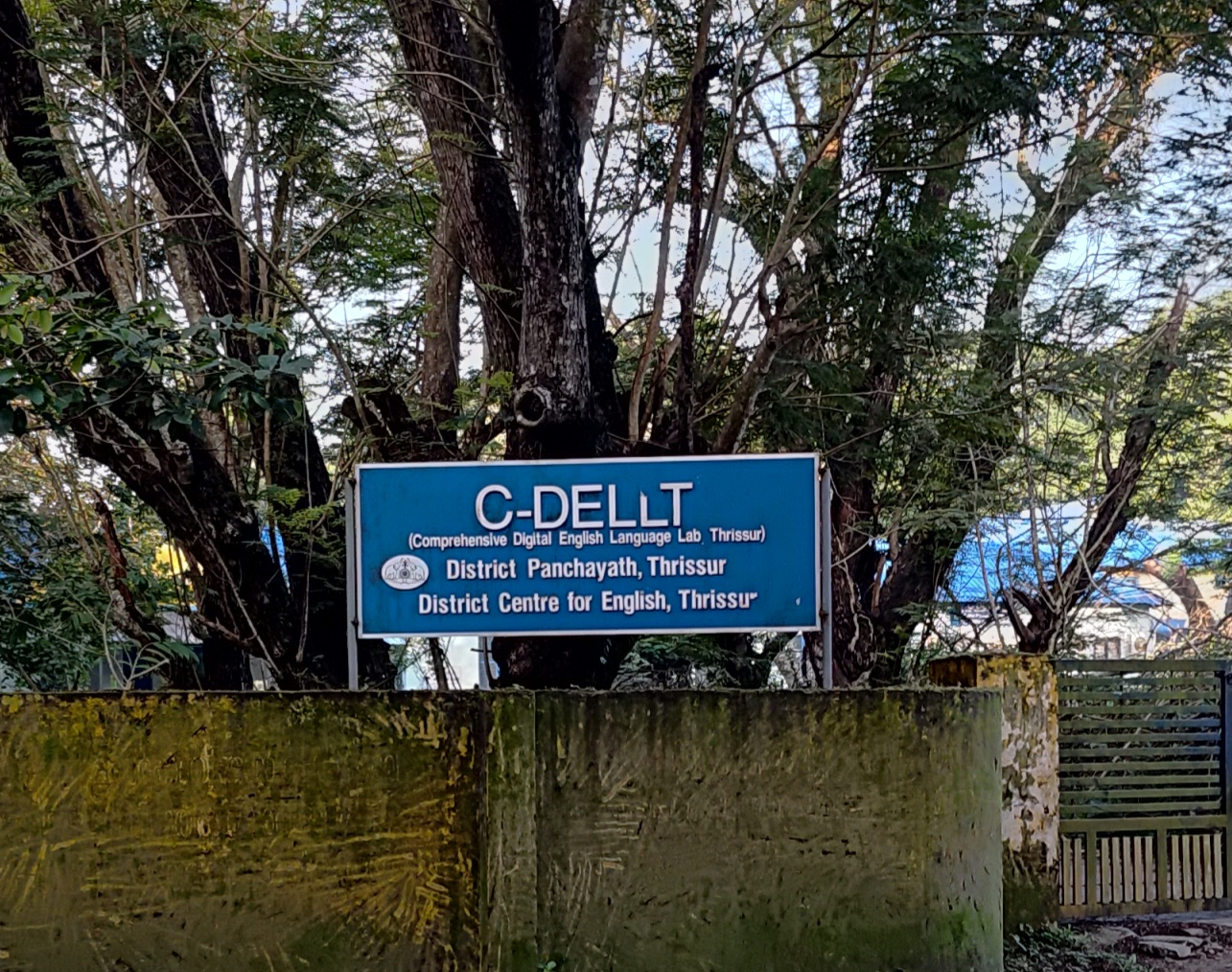
24. Comprehensive Digital English Language Lab, Ramavarmapuram

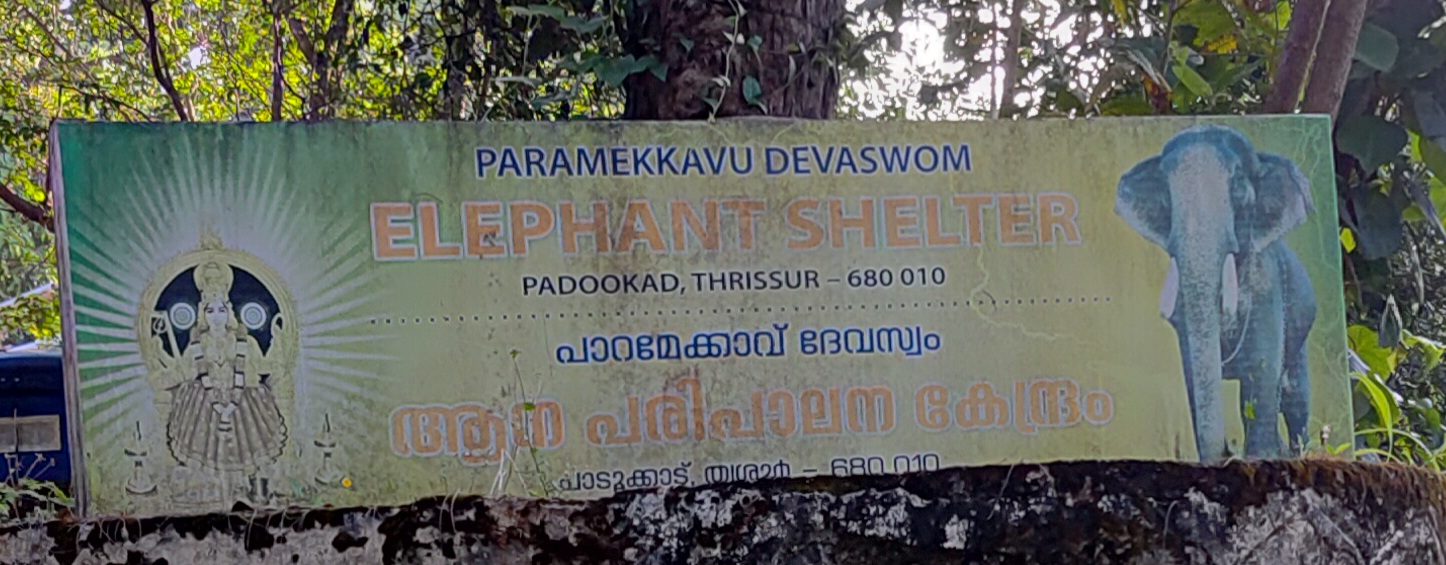
25. Elephant Shelter of Paramekkavu Devaswom

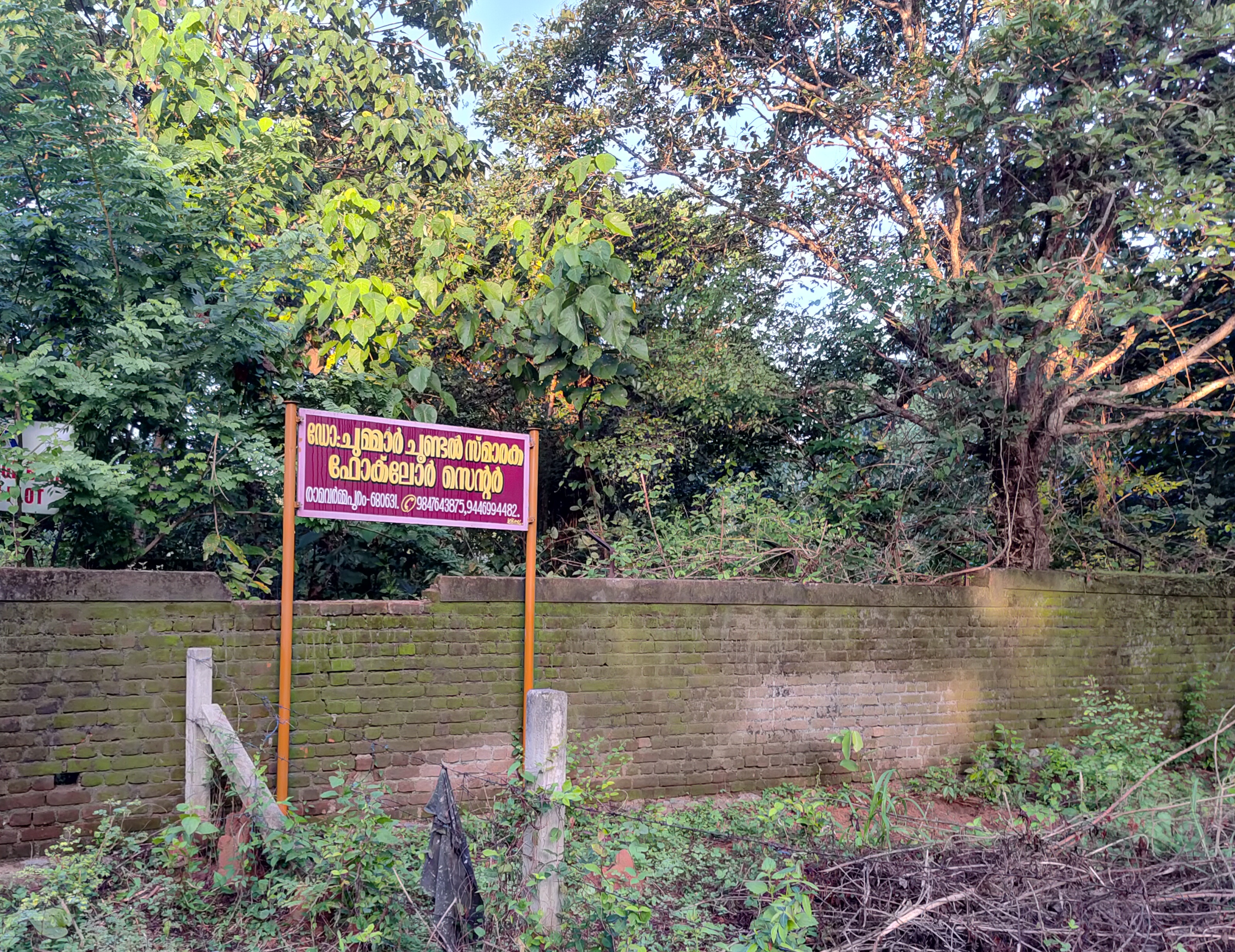
26. Plot for Dr Chummar Choondal Memorial Folklore Centre, Ramavarmapuram

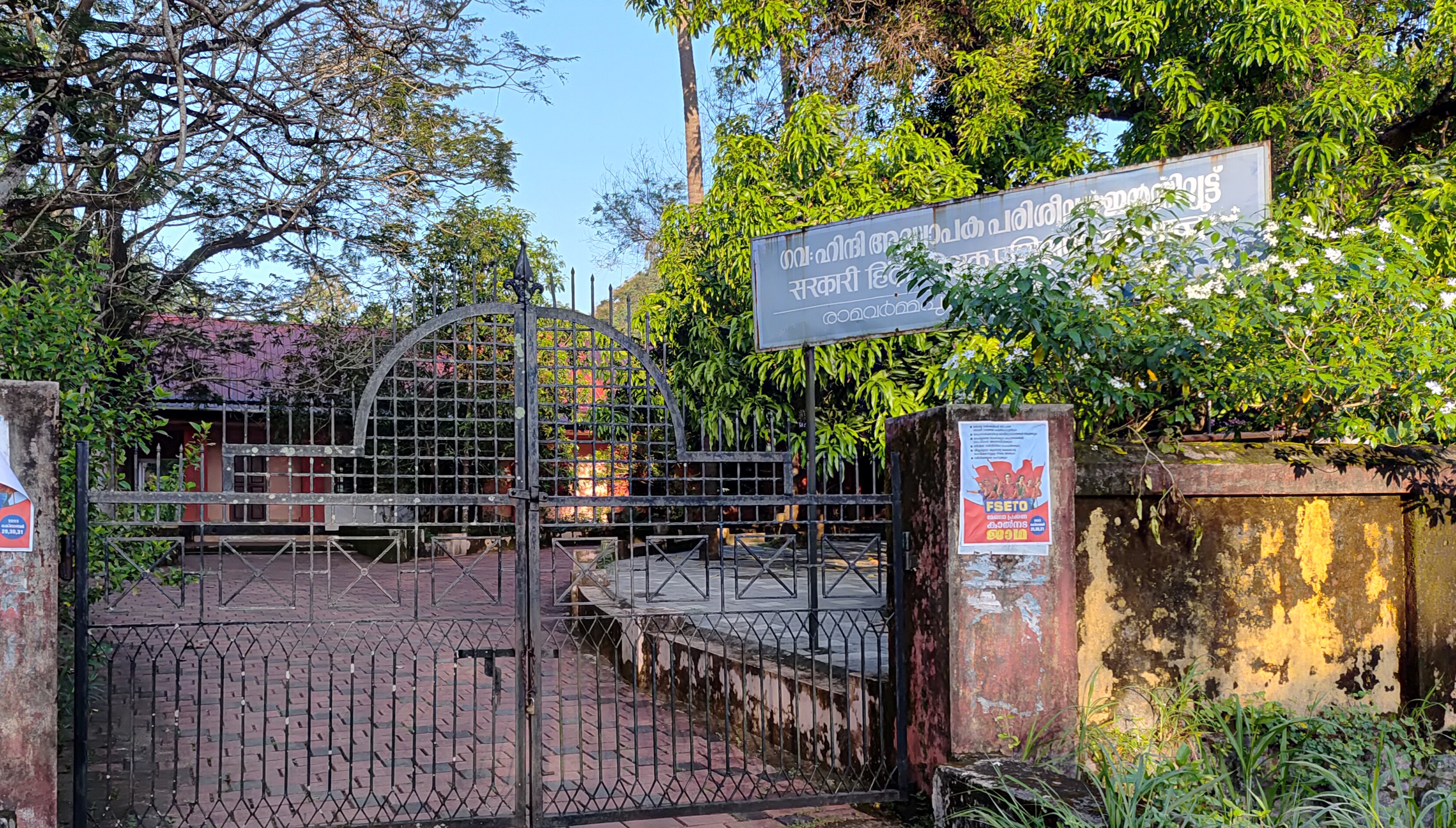
27. Govt Hindi Teachers Training Institute, probably the only one of its kind in Kerala

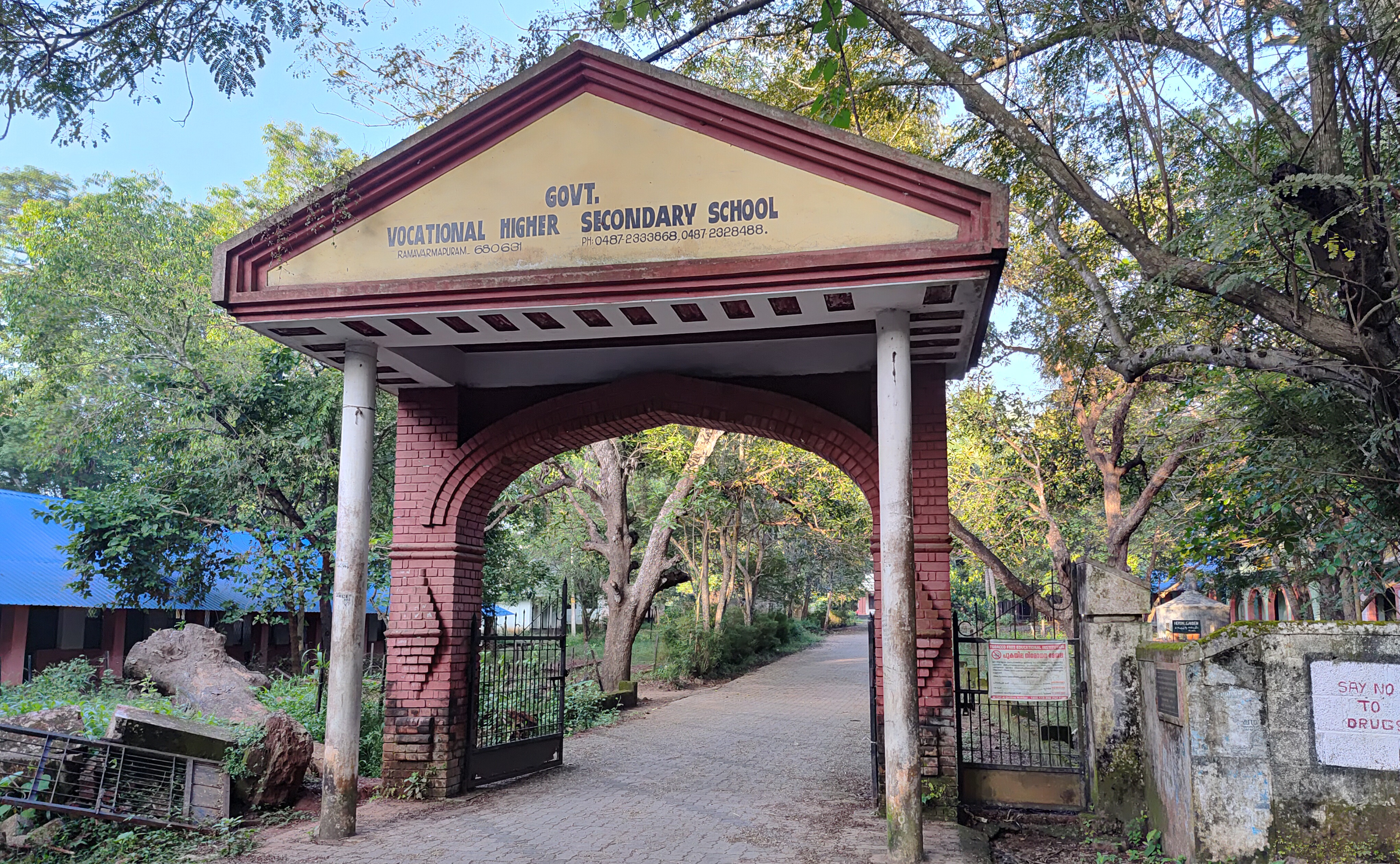
28. Govt Vocational Higher Secondary School, Ramavarmapuram

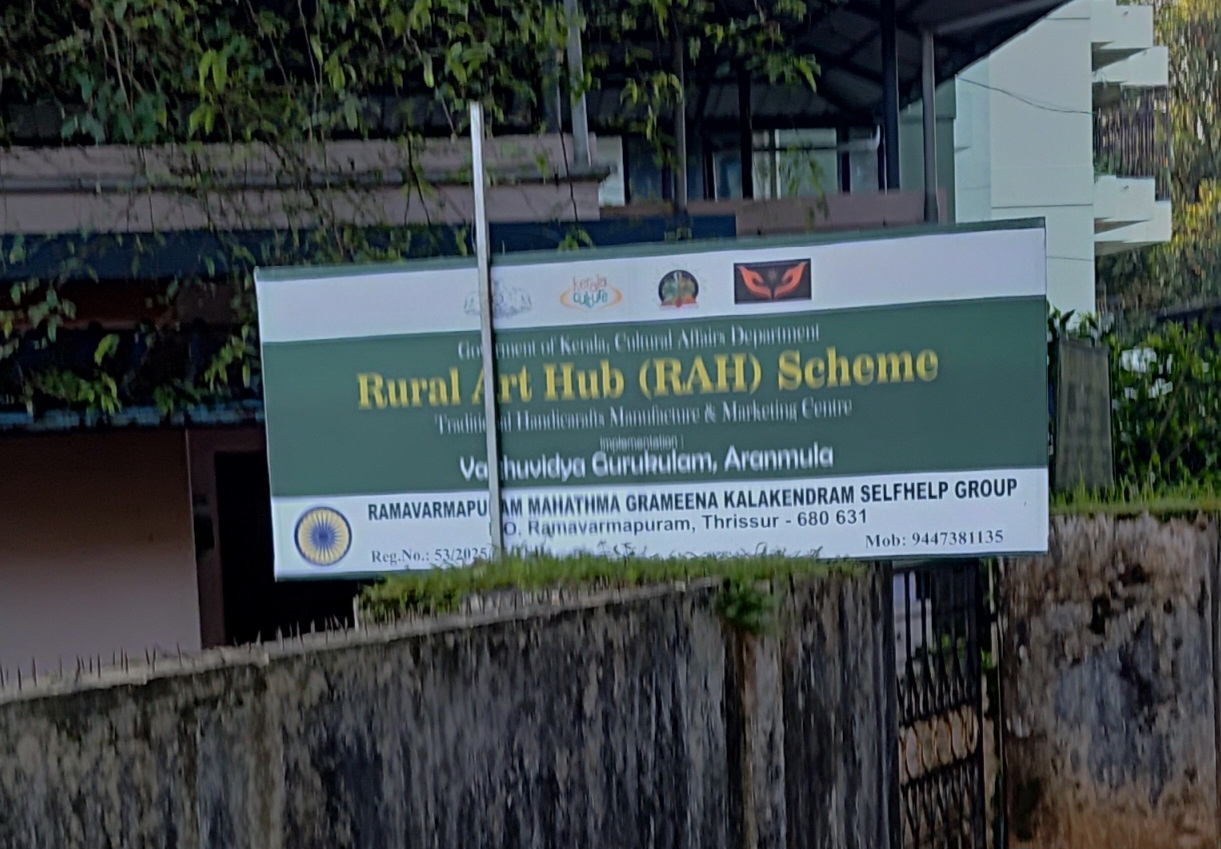
29. Rural Art Hub Scheme, Traditional Handicrafts Manufacturing and Marketing Centre, under Vasthuvidya Gurukulam

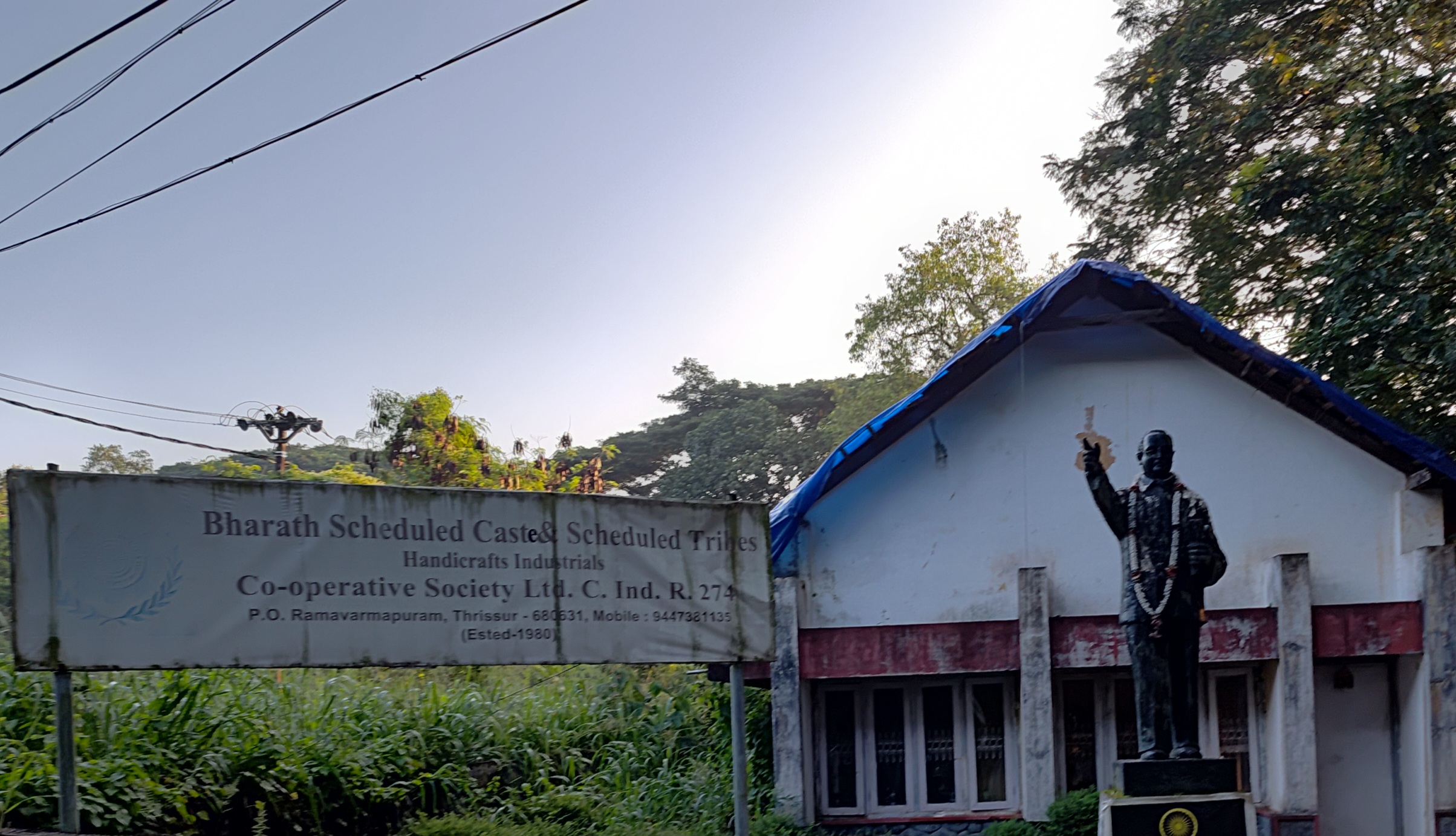
30. Bharath Scheduled Castes & Scheduled Tribes Handicrafts Industrials Cooperative Society Ltd, established in 1980

31. India Reserve Battalion, Ramavarmapuram, Thrissur, Kerala

== See also ==
- Thrissur
- List of Thrissur Corporation wards
