= Kerala State Chalachithra Academy =

Non-profit film academy in Kerala

- Formation: 17 August 1998; 28 years ago
- Type: Government-aided academy
- Purpose: Promotion of cinema
- Headquarters: Centre for International Film Research and Archives (CIFRA), KINFRA Film and Video Park Kazhakuttom, Thiruvananthapuram
- Region served: The State of Kerala, India
- Key people: Raveendran
- Parent organization: Department of Cultural Affairs, Government of Kerala
- Website: keralafilm.com

Kerala State Chalachithra Academy is an autonomous non-profit institution based in Thiruvananthapuram, working under the Department of Cultural Affairs, Government of Kerala.

== History ==
It was founded in August 1998 for the promotion of cinema in Kerala, considering that cinema is the most popular art form in the state. The academy was the first of its kind in India; it was formed on the basis of the Karant committee report (1980), which proposed the formation of a national film academy. Under the leadership of T. K. Ramakrishnan, the Minister for Cultural Affairs appointed Shaji N. Karun as its first chairman.

Office of Kerala State Chalachithra Academy in Thiruvananthapuram

== Objectives ==
The objectives and functions of the academy are:

1. To help Government in the formulation of policies connected with film and television related activities
2. To set up a film and video archive
3. To set up a Directorate of Film Festivals
4. To manage and distribute State Award for films and video programmes
5. To set up an Audio Visual Library for the public
6. To function as a link between the Government and film industry
7. To evolve a financial mechanism to support films having aesthetic and social importance
8. To extend promotional support to makers of good films and TV/Video programmes
9. To advise the Government to set up a Film and Television institute in the State and to start a State Television channel
10. To plan and execute specific films and television activities with the co-operation of KSFDC and C-DIT
11. To promote children's films and to create sufficient arrangements to exhibit them in schools and other cultural centres
12. To set up a documentation cell to document the history of Malayalam Cinema and profile of film personalities
13. To organise film appreciation and study camps in different places
14. To set up an Academic Library and provide research facilities to public and students
15. To publish books, journals, etc. on cinema and television
16. To support film societies by providing grants and other facilities
17. To hold meetings, seminars, conferences, lectures, symposia and discussion on cinema, television and other arts
18. To honour eminent personalities in cinema and television from the State and the country
19. To distribute subsidy to Malayalam films and to carry out such directions as may be given by the Government from time to time

== Activities ==
- Honouring achievements in Malayalam films: Tha academy organises the Kerala State Film Awards from 1999. The award, which was started in 1963 was managed directly by the Department of Cultural Affairs, Government of Kerala.
- Film Festivals: The academy hosts the International Film Festival of Kerala (IFFK), a prestigious film festival in India. The best films in the festival are honoured with the Crow Pheasant Awards.
- Bestowing fellowships on various personalities in the field of cinema.
- Promotion of film societies.
- Publication of books and periodicals on cinema.
- Conducting film appreciation courses.
- Organising seminars and workshops for students and professionals.

== Kerala State Film Awards ==
The academy organises the Kerala State Film Awards, which are given away yearly for the achievements in Malayalam films. The awardees are decided by an independent jury formed by the academy and the Department of Cultural Affairs, Govt. of Kerala. The jury usually consists of eminent personalities from the film field. For the awards for literature on cinema a separate jury is formed. The academy annually invites films for the award and the jury analyses the films that are submitted before deciding the winners. The awards intend to promote films with artistic values and encourage artistes and technicians. The awards are declared by the Minister for Cultural Affairs, Govt. of Kerala.

== Kerala State Television Awards ==
The emergence of Television as a popular medium found acceptance at the academy as separate awards were constituted for Television programmes also. The academy organises the Kerala State Television Awards since 1993, which are given away yearly for the achievements in Malayalam Television. The awards are declared by the Minister for Cultural Affairs, Govt. of Kerala.

== IFFK ==
The IFFK (International Film Festival of Kerala) is one of the prominent film festivals hosted in India, accredited by FIAPF and managed by the academy. The Festival is held in the first week of December every year in Thiruvananthapuram. The international competition category comprises film from Asia, Africa and Latin America. The festival is always noted for its public support and is considered as one of the biggest cultural events in India.

== IDSFFK ==
The IDSFFK (International Documentary and Short Film Festival of Kerala) is an annual documentary and short film festival conducted by Kerala State Chalachithra Academy, at the state capital Thiruvananthapuram.

== See also ==
- Cinema of Kerala
- Kerala State Film Development Corporation
