= Vasthuvidya Gurukulam =

- Founded: 1993 November 17
- Type: Architectural and Mural Painting Institution
- Location: Vasthuvidya Gurukulam, Aranmula, Pathanamthitta, Kerala
- Chairman: Padmasri Dr G Shankar
- Parent organization: Department of Culture, Government of Kerala
- Website: www.vasthuvidyagurukulam.com

Vasthuvidya Gurukulam at Aranmula, Pathanamthitta, Kerala is a State-run institution for the promotion of traditional architecture and mural paintings. Founded on 17 November 1993, Vasthuvidya Gurukulam comes under Department of Culture, Government of Kerala and is attached to the Ministry of Cultural Affairs-Centre for the Promotion and Preservation and Traditional Architecture and Mural Painting. It is recognised by Ministry of Human Resource Development, Government of India, and the project is assisted by United Nations Development Programme(UNDP). The institution is located on the banks of Pampa river, near Parthasarathy Temple.

Vasthuvidya Gurukulam conducts courses including Post Graduate Diploma in Traditional Architecture(PGDTA), Diploma in Traditional Architecture Correspondence Course (DTAC), Certificate course in Traditional Architecture(CTA) and other short term Mural Painting courses. It also offers consultancy services including Architectural design based on traditional Kerala vastu principle, Rectification of already built structures, Design of temples and churches and preservation of old structures according to vastuvidya.

There is a separate department for Mural paintings along with an Art Gallery. The institution also conducts survey and documentation of ancient structures for the purposes of research. The institution is equipped with a reference library and competent faculty members are available at the Research centre.

Important projects undertaken by Vasthuvidya Gurukulam includes Vyloppily Samskriti Bhavan, Koothamblam at Ramanilayam, Trichur, and Mannam Ayurvedic Medical College at Pandalam.
