= Thrissur Assembly constituency =

Constituency of the Kerala legislative assembly in India

Thrissur
- Constituency No. 67 for the Kerala Legislative Assembly
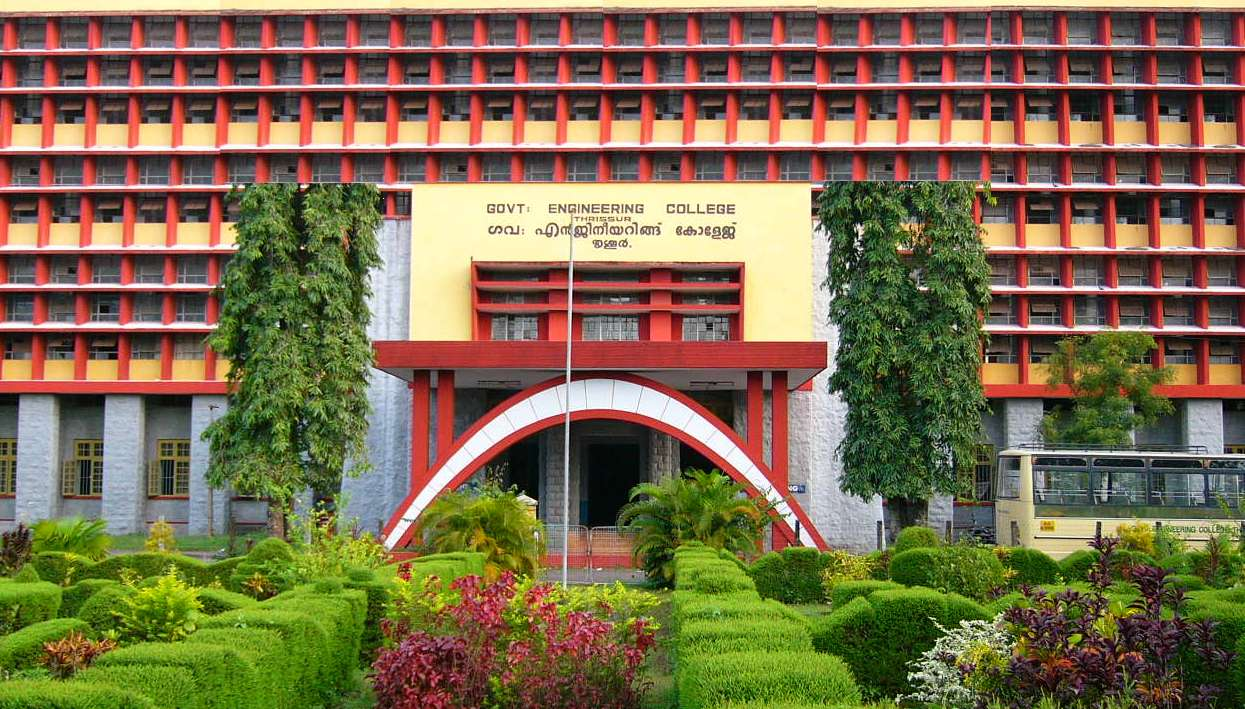
- Government Engineering College, Thrissur, the second-oldest Government Engineering College in the state.

Constituency details
- Country: India
- Region: South India
- State: Kerala
- District: Thrissur
- Established: 1957
- Total electors: 1,72,358 (2016)
- Reservation: None

Member of Legislative Assembly
- 16th Kerala Legislative Assembly
- Incumbent Rajan Pallan
- Party: INC
- Alliance: UDF
- Elected year: 2026

Thrissur is one of the 140 state legislative assembly constituencies in Kerala. It is also one of the seven state legislative assembly constituencies included in Thrissur Lok Sabha constituency. As of the 2026 Assembly elections, the current MLA is Rajan Pallan of INC.

== Local self-governed segments ==
Thrissur Assembly constituency is composed of the following 41 wards of the Thrissur Municipal Corporation:

Ward no.	Name	Ward no.	Name	Ward no.	Name
1	Punkunnam	2	Kuttankulangara	3	Patturaikkal
4	Viyyoor	5	Peringavu	6	Ramavarmapuram
7	Kuttumukku	8	Villadam	9	Cherur
10	Mukkattukara	11	Gandhinagar	12	Chembukkavu
13	Kizhakkumpattukara	14	Paravattani	15	Ollukkara
16	Nettissery	19	Krishnapuram	20	Kalathodu
21	Nadathara	22	Chelakkottukara	23	Mission Quarters
27	Kuttanellur	33	Chiyyaram North	34	Kannamkulangara
35	Pallikulam	36	Thekkinkadu	37	Kottappuram
38	Poothole	39	Kokkala	40	Vadookkara
45	Karyattukara	46	Chettupuzha	47	Pullazhi
48	Olarikara	49	Elthuruth	50	Laloor
51	Aranattukara	52	Kanattukara	53	Ayyanthole
54	Civil Station	55	Puthurkkara		

== Members of the Legislative Assembly ==
The following list contains all members of Kerala Legislative Assembly who have represented the constituency:

Election	Name	Party
1957	A. R. Menon	Independent
1960	T. A. Dharmaraja Iyer	Indian National Congress
1965	T. P. Seetharaman	Indian National Congress
1967	K. S. Nair	Communist Party of India (Marxist)
1970	Joseph Mundassery	Independent
1977	K J George	Janata Party
1980	M. K. Kannan	Communist Party of India (Marxist)
1982	Therambil Ramakrishnan	National Democratic Party
1987	E. K. Menon	Communist Party of India (Marxist)
1991	Therambil Ramakrishnan	Indian National Congress
1996	Therambil Ramakrishnan	Indian National Congress
2001	Therambil Ramakrishnan	Indian National Congress
2006	Therambil Ramakrishnan	Indian National Congress
2011	Therambil Ramakrishnan	Indian National Congress
2016	V. S. Sunil Kumar	Communist Party of India
2021	P Balachandran	Communist Party of India
2026	Rajan J. Pallan	Indian National Congress

== Election Results ==
=== 2026 ===
2026 Kerala Legislative Assembly election: Thrissur
Party	Candidate	Votes	%	±%
INC	Rajan Pallan	60,290	48.55	▲15.03
CPI	Alancode Leelakrishnan	33,487	26.97	▼7.28
BJP	Padmaja Venugopal	28,662	23.08	▼8.22
AAP	Rani Anto	299	0.24	
Independent	Rajan M.	153	0.12	
BSP	Roslin Chacko	138	0.11	
CPI(ML)L	Arshed Aziz	110	0.09	
NOTA	None of the above	1,043	0.84	▲0.28
Margin of victory		26,803	21.58	▲21.25
Turnout		1,24,182	68.41	▼2.32
INC gain from CPI		Swing	▲15.03	

=== 2021 ===
2021 Kerala Legislative Assembly election: Thrissur
Party	Candidate	Votes	%	±%
CPI	P. Balachandran	44,263	34.25	▼7.94
INC	Padmaja Venugopal	43,317	33.52	▼3.18
BJP	Suresh Gopi	40,457	31.30	▲11.84
NOTA	None of the above	712	0.56	▼0.33
Independent	Ajith Menon Ponnemkattil	252	0.19	▲0.01
IGP	Thrissur Mukundan	225	0.17	▲0.11
Margin of victory		946	0.73	▼4.76
Turnout		1,29,237	70.73	▼3.06
CPI hold		Swing	▼7.94	

=== 2016 ===
2016 Kerala Legislative Assembly election: Thrissur
Party	Candidate	Votes	%	±%
CPI	V. S. Sunil Kumar	53,664	42.19	▲3.34
INC	Padmaja Venugopal	46,677	36.70	▼16.49
BJP	B. Gopalakrishnan	24,748	19.46	▲13.52
NOTA	None of the above	1,128	0.89	▲0.11
Independent	Anthony J. Maliakal	256	0.20	▲0.20
SP	P. S. Unnikrishnan	226	0.18	▲0.18
PDP	Raji Mani	154	0.12	▲0.12
SUCI(C)	M. Pradeepan	111	0.09	▲0.09
IGP	Santhakumari K. V.	74	0.06	▲0.06
Margin of victory		6,987	5.49	▲2.15
CPI gain from INC		Swing	▲3.34	
Turnout		1,27,191	73.79	▲4.12

=== 2011 ===
2011 Kerala Legislative Assembly election: Thrissur
Party	Candidate	Votes	%	±%
INC	Therambil Ramakrishnan	59,991	53.19	▲
CPI	P. Balachandran	43,822	38.85	▲
BJP	Ravikumar Uppath	6,697	5.94	▲
Independent	Therambil Radhakrishnan	1,405	1.25	▲
BSP	A. Jayaram	879	0.78	▲
Margin of victory		16,169	14.34	▲
INC hold		Swing		
Turnout		1,27,191	73.79	▲

== See also ==
- Thrissur
- Thrissur district
- List of constituencies of the Kerala Legislative Assembly
- 2016 Kerala Legislative Assembly election
