= List of Thrissur Corporation wards =

Thrissur is one of the six major cities in the state of Kerala, India. Thrissur city, being home to several cultural, literary and other institutions like Kerala Sahitya Academy and Kerala Sangeetha Nadaka Academy is nicknamed the Cultural Capital of Kerala. The City is also home to several monuments having great historical significance. The City is also associated with several rulers of the erstwhile Kingdom of Cochin.

== List of the Thrissur Corporation wards and Councillors ==
The following is the list of the wards and the respective Corporation Councillors of Thrissur Municipal Corporation after the elections to the local self-government bodies in Kerala held in December 2020.

Ward No.	Ward Name	Corporation Councillor	Political affiliation
1	Punkunnam (പൂങ്കുന്നം)	Dr. V. Athira	BJP
2	Kuttankulangara	A. K. Suresh	UDF
3	Patturaikkal	N. V. Radhika	BJP
4	Viyyur	Ranya Baiju	UDF
5	Peringavu (പെരിങ്ങാവ്)	N. A. Gopakumar	UDF
6	Ramavarmapuram	Rajasree Gopan	LDF
7	Kuttumukku	Radhika Asokan	LDF
8	Villadam	I Satheeshkumar	LDF
9	Cherur	Adv. Villy	UDF
10	Mukkattukara (മുക്കാട്ടുകര)	Subhi Sukumar	LDF
11	Gandhinagar	Rajan J Pallan	UDF
12	Chembukkavu	Reji Joy	UDF
13	Kizhakkumpattukara	John Daniel	UDF
14	Paravattani	Sheeba Joy	LDF
15	Ollukkara (ഒല്ലൂക്കര)	Syamala Muraleedharan	UDF
16	Nettissery	M K Varghese	LDF
17	Mullakkara	Adv. T. A. Anees Ahammed	LDF
18	Mannuthy	Reshma Hemage	LDF
19	Krishnapuram	Beena Murali	LDF
20	Kalathodu	M. L. Rosy	LDF
21	Nadathara	Sheeba Babu	LDF
22	Chelakkottukara	Mercy Aji	UDF
23	Mission Quarters	Leela Varghese	UDF
24	Valarkavu	E. V. Sunil Raj	UDF
25	Kuriachira	Nimmy Rappai	UDF
26	Ancheri	Varghese Kandamkulathi	LDF
27	Kuttanellur (കുട്ടനെല്ലൂര്‍)	Syamala Venugopalan	LDF
28	Patavarad	Neethu Dileesh	LDF
29	Edakkunni(എടക്കുന്നി )	Carolin Perinchery	LDF
30	Thaikattussery, Thrissur(തൈക്കാട്ടുശ്ശേരി)	C. P. Pauly	LDF
31	Ollur (ഒല്ലൂര്‍)	Sanoj K Paul	UDF
32	Chiyyaram South	Limna Manoj	LDF
33	Chiyyaram North	Ancy Jacob Pulikkottil	UDF
34	Kannamkulangara (കണ്ണംകുളങ്ങര)	Mukesh Kulapparambil	UDF
35	Pallikkulam	Sindhu Anto Chakkola	UDF
36	Thekkinkadu	Poornima Suresh	BJP
37	Kottappuram (കോട്ടപ്പുറം)	K. G. Niji	BJP
38	Poothole(പൂത്തോള്‍)	Saramma Robson	LDF
39	Kokkalai	Vinod Pollanchery	BJP
40	Vadookara (വടൂക്കര)	P. V. Anilkumar	LDF
41	Koorkenchery	Vinesh Thayyil	UDF
42	Kanimangalam	Jayaprakash Poovvathinkal	UDF
43	Panamukku	Rahul Nath A R	LDF
44	Nedupuzha	Eby Varghese	UDF
45	Karyattukara	Laly James	UDF
46	Chettupuzha	Adv. Rajina Jipson	LDF
47	Pullazhi (പുല്ലഴി)	K Ramannathan	UDF
48	Olarikara	Sreelal Sreedhar	UDF
49	Elthuruth	Sajitha Shibhu	LDF
50	Laloor	P. K. Shajan	LDF
51	Aranattukara	Anoop Davis Kada	LDF
52	Kanattukara	P. Sukumaran	LDF
53	Ayyanthole	N. Prasad	BJP
54	Civil Station	Sunitha Vinu	UDF
55	Puthurkkara	Maphy Delson	UDF
