= Administration of Thrissur =

Municipal administration in Kerala, India

Administration of Thrissur, Kerala, India, is handled by the Thrissur Municipal Corporation, consisting of 56 councilors and headed by the city's mayor.

== Administration ==
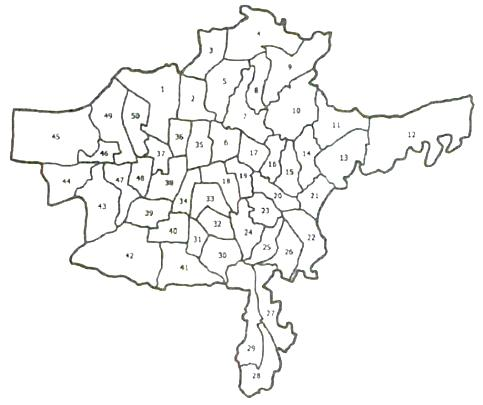
Map of Thrissur Municipal Corporation showing boundaries of wards

Thrissur city is governed by the Thrissur Municipal Corporation, consisting of councillors who represent 55 wards and are directly elected by the city's residents. From among themselves, the councillors elect a mayor and a deputy mayor who preside over about 8 standing committees. Out of 55 seats, 26 are reserved for women (general); 2 are reserved for SC (women) and 2 are reserved for SC.Thrissur has one parliamentary constituency—Thrissur Lok Sabha constituency—and elects two members of the Legislative Assembly (MLAs) to the state legislature. The Thrissur City Police, a division of the Kerala Police, is the law enforcement agency in the city. The city police force is headed by a commissioner of police, and administrative control rests with the Kerala Home Ministry. The department consists of two subdivisions with a total of 14 police stations. The city's traffic is managed by the Thrissur City Traffic Police.

== Waste Management ==
The city generates around 160 tonnes of waste every day. But it doesn't have any proper procedure to process it. Earlier, Laloor was used to dump the waste from the city. Because of protest and indefinite strike which was started on 2 October 1988, dumping was stopped there. The last truck carrying waste reached Laloor on 27 June 2012.

On 3 October 2012, foundation was laid for an organic waste converter treatment plant in Sakthan Thampuran Nagar. The waste converter was inaugurated by Urban Affairs Minister Manjalamkuzhi Ali on 28 May 2013. The converter was set up at a cost of Rs 95 lakh on 45 cents of land can process 4 tonnes of waste a day. The city also has nine bio-gas plants at West Fort, Ayyanthole, Aranattukara, Anappara, Olarikara, Mannuthy, Ollur and Cheerachi. Another four at Sakthan Nagar, Panamkuttichira, Vilvattam and Ollukkara has been given approval.

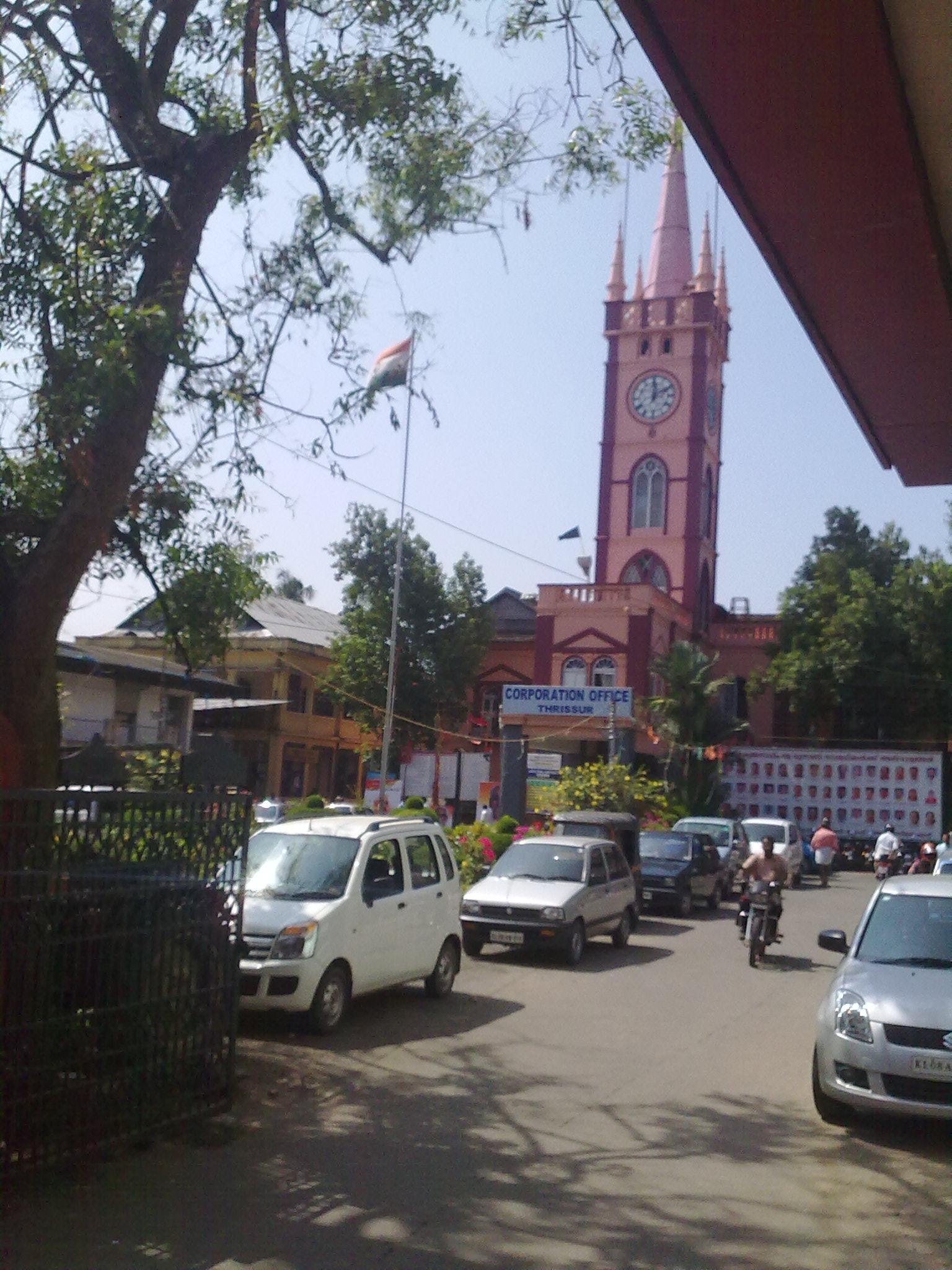
Municipal Corporation Building, Thrissur seen from M.O. Road, Thrissur

.

== Utility services ==
Electricity is distributed by Thrissur Corporation Electricity Department of Thrissur Municipal Corporation in older municipal limits and in new corporation limits it is done by Kerala State Electricity Board. Thrissur Municipal Corporation started the distribution on 19 August 1937, through a declaration from the Maharaja of Cochin. Thrissur Municipal Corporation is the only local body in the State that has been given the license to distribute power by procuring power from Kerala State Electricity Board even when it was a municipality. It has 161 transformers around the city to distribute the electricity.

== Water management ==
Thrissur city receives about 29 million liters per day (MLD) from Peechi Dam and Karuvannur River against the required amount of 50 MLD. This demand is expected to rise to 80 MLD by 2051. Many residential apartments, houses use ground water resources to meet its water needs.

== See also ==
- List of Thrissur Corporation wards
