= Thrissur Municipal Corporation =

Local civic body in Thrissur, Kerala, India

Thrissur Municipal Corporation തൃശൂർ നഗരസഭ

Type
- Type: Municipal Corporation of the Thrissur
- Established: 2000

Leadership
- Mayor: Dr.Niji Justin, INC
- Deputy Mayor: A Prasad, INC
- Leader of Opposition: Hiran
- Municipal Corporation Secretary: Shibu V P

Structure
- Seats: 56
- Political groups: Government (35): INC (33); IND (2); Official Opposition (11); LDF (11): CPI(M) (8); CPI (2); JD(S) (1) (Note: JD(S) Kerala unit is part of LDF in Kerala.); Other Opposition (10): BJP (8); IND (2)
- Committees: Finance Standing Committee
- Committees: Development Standing Committee
- Joint committees: Welfare Standing Committee

Elections
- Voting system: First-past-the-post
- Last election: 11 December 2025
- Next election: December 2030

Meeting place
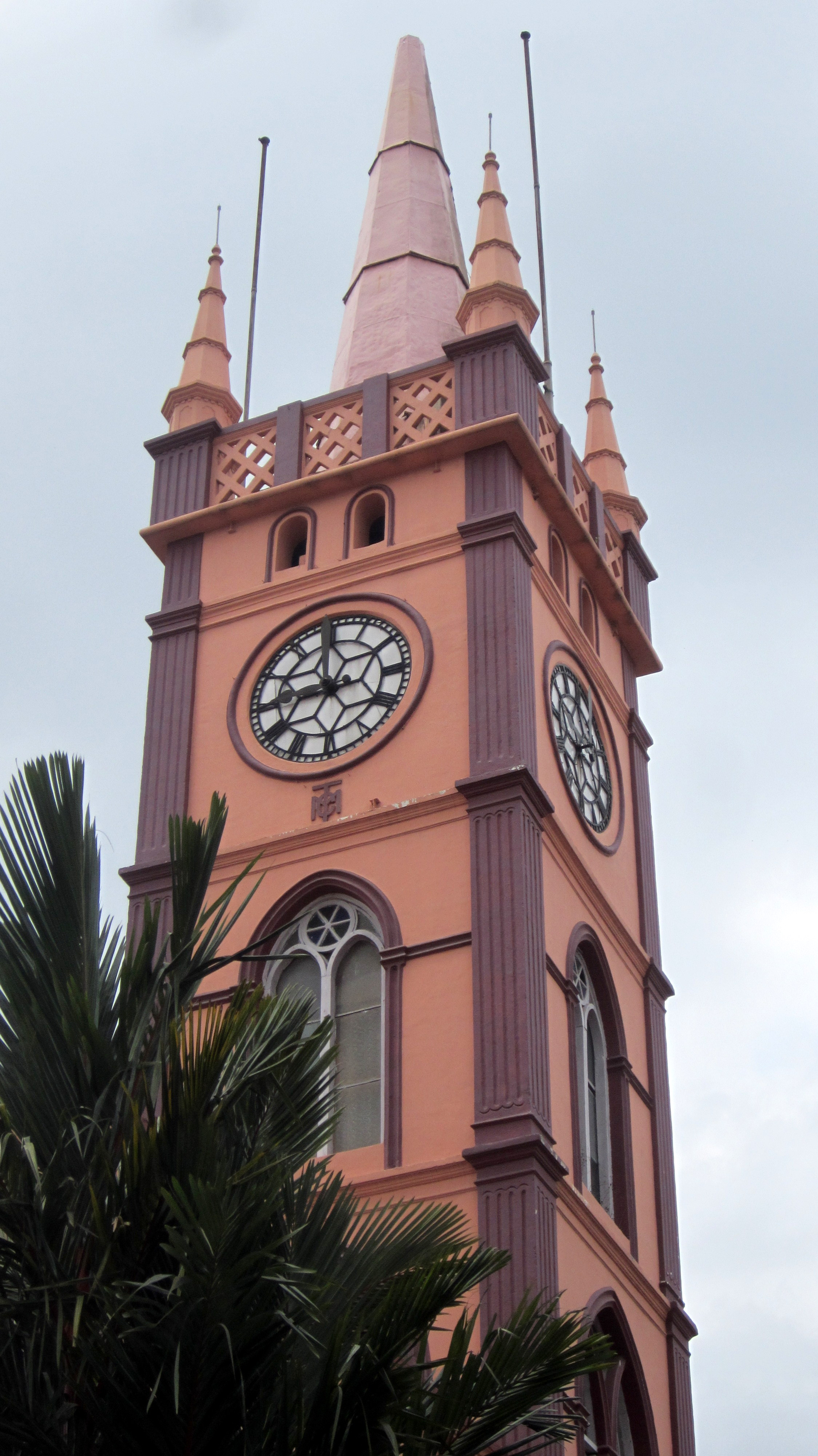
- Municipal Corporation Building, Thrissur

Website
- thrissurcorporation.lsgkerala.gov.in

The Thrissur Municipal Corporation is the civic body that governs Thrissur city in Kerala, India. It is the third largest city Corporation in the state of Kerala by area and the fourth largest in population. Established as a Municipality since 1921 under the Cochin Municipal Regulations, it is responsible for civic infrastructure and administration; the distribution of electricity and water for Thrissur city. The Corporation manages 101.42 km of Thrissur city limits of through 56 wards through five zones Ayyanthole, Vilvattom, Ollukkara, Ollur and Koorkanchery. Thrissur Municipal Corporation has been formed with functions to improve the infrastructure of the city.

== History ==
Prior to the constitution of the municipality, there was a sanitary board functioning in 1910 under a sergeant and the town council after 1911. In 1932, the new Municipal Corporation Building, Thrissur was constructed. On 1 July 1942, Thrissur Municipality was born and in 2000, it was upgraded by the Kerala Government to Municipal corporation. The first elections to the corporation were held in 2000. Ayyanthole, Ollukkara, Koorkenchery, Ollur and Vilvattom Panchayaths and parts of Nadathara and Kolazhy Panchayaths were merged with the municipality to form the Thrissur Municipal Corporation.

The corporation comprises two legislative assemblies Thrissur Assembly Constituency and Ollur Assembly Constituency. The city is administered by the Thrissur Municipal Corporation, headed by a mayor. Thrissur Municipal Corporation is the third-largest city corporation in the state of Kerala. The city is the only local body and city in Kerala which directly controls power, water supply and solid waste management system in the Thrissur city. For administrative purposes, the city is divided into 56 wards, from which the members of the corporation council are elected for five years. The corporation has its headquarters in Thrissur city.

== Revenue sources ==
The following are the Income sources for the corporation from the Central and State Government.

=== Revenue from taxes ===
Following is the Tax related revenue for the corporation.

- Property tax.
- Profession tax.
- Entertainment tax.
- Grants from Central and State Government like Goods and Services Tax.
- Advertisement tax.

=== Revenue from non-tax sources ===
Following is the Non Tax related revenue for the corporation.

- Water usage charges.
- Fees from Documentation services.
- Rent received from municipal property.
- Funds from municipal bonds.

== Master plans ==
The first master plan for Thrissur city was sanctioned by the Kerala Government in October 1972 with a plan period of 20 years in accordance with the Town Planning Act. It was expected that the town would accommodate a population of 1,75,000 in 1991. The sanctioned Development Plan (1972) for Thrissur envisaged a growth pattern integrating rural areas and the urban center of Thrissur so as to provide the rural areas with employment opportunities and social amenities. The Town and Country Planning Department (TCPD) and Thrissur Urban Development Authority (TUDA) are the agencies that prepare the plan. A new Master plan, which is in the anvil since last 10 or more years has been a long-awaited dream of Thrissur as people are struggling to get building permits under the existing outdated master plan.

== Income ==
As of 2014-15 revenue, the annual budgetary estimate of Thrissur Corporation is Rs 346.27 crore. Surplus income of the corporation is Rs 6.63 crore. Property tax is the main source of revenue for Thrissur Corporation.

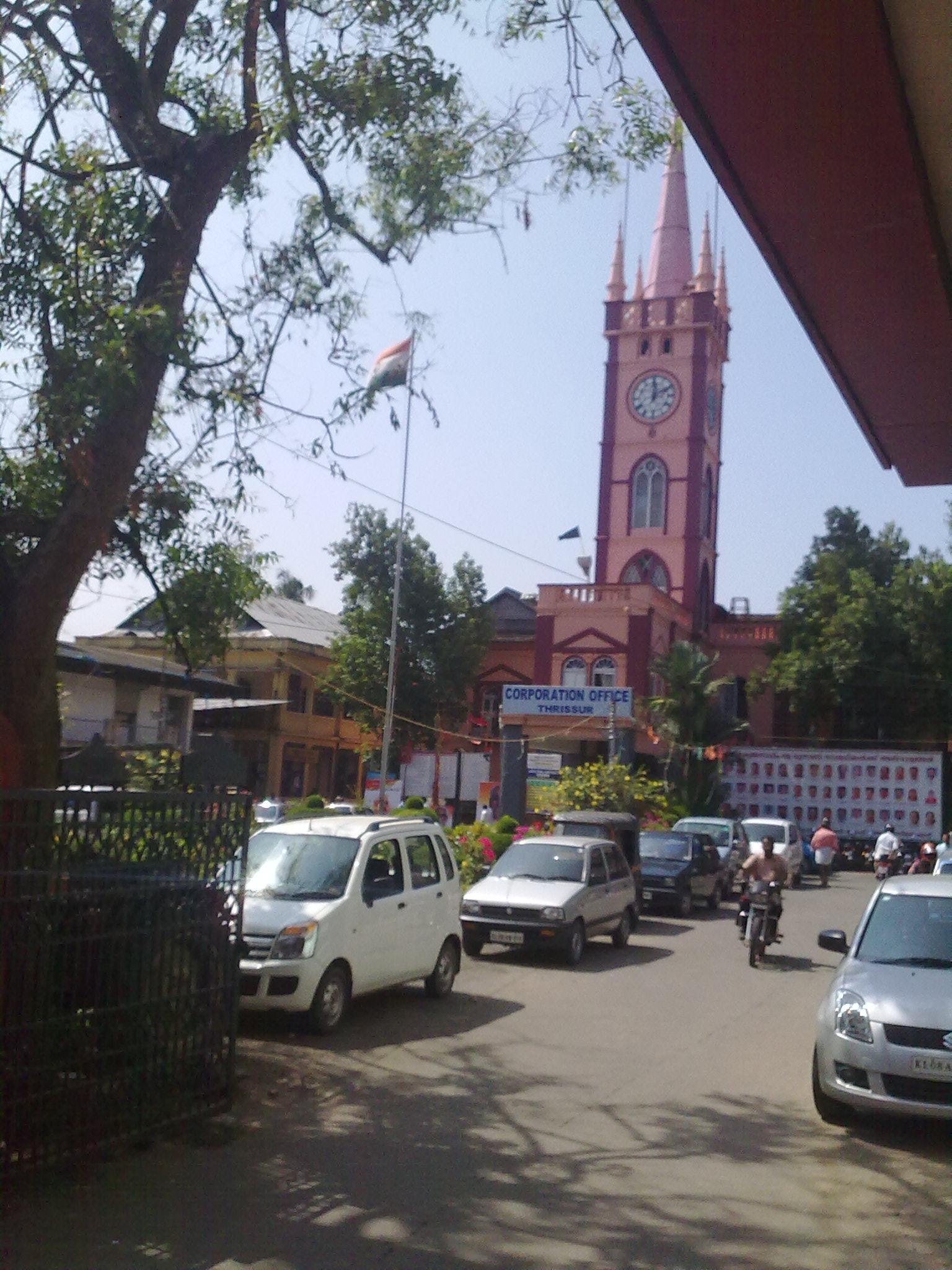
Municipal Corporation Building, Thrissur seen from M.O. Road, Thrissur

.

== Departments ==
The Corporation Secretary, appointed by the Government of Kerala, is the chief executive officer of the Thrissur Municipal Corporation and oversees its administrative affairs, assisted by an Additional Secretary and technical officials.

- General Section
- Revenue Section
- Engineering Section
- Education Section
- Water Supply Division
- Relief Settlement Section
- MCH Centre
- Health Department
- Sanitation Establishment
- Birth and Death Section
- Anti-Mosquito Establishment
- Market and Slaughter House
- Town Planning Section
- Electrical Department

The Thrissur Municipal Corporation is the only local body in Kerala engaged in electricity distribution. Through the Thrissur Corporation Electricity Department (TCED), it supplies power to about 43,000 consumers within 12.65 sq. km, with annual energy sales of around 180 MU.

== Standing Committees ==
There are eight standing committees in the corporation, tasked with different aspects of governance. They are:

- Finance Standing Committee
- Development Standing Committee
- Welfare Standing Committee
- Health Standing Committee
- Public Works Standing Committee
- Town Planning Standing Committee
- Tax Appeal Standing Committee
- Education & Sports Standing Committee

== Mayors of Thrissur ==
Mayors of Thrissur
From	Until	Incumbent	Party
5 October 2000	3 April 2004	Jose Kattukkaran	Indian National Congress
28 April 2004	30 September 2005	Radhakrishnan K	Indian National Congress
7 October 2005	6 October 2010	R. Bindu	Communist Party of India (Marxist)
9 November 2010	14 January 2013	I.P. Paul	Indian National Congress
15 January 2014	4 June 2015	Rajan Pallan	Indian National Congress
19 November 2015	12 December 2018	Ajitha Jayarajan	Communist Party of India (Marxist)
12 December 2018	28 January 2020	Ajitha Vijayan	Communist Party of India
20 February 2020	11 November 2020	Ajitha Jayarajan	Communist Party of India (Marxist)
27 December 2020	16 December 2025	M K Varghese	Left Democratic Front (Independent)
2025	Present	Dr. Niji Justin	Indian National Congress

== Deputy Mayors ==
Deputy Mayors of Thrissur
From	Until	Incumbent	Party
2000	2004	K Radhakrishnan	Indian National Congress
2004	2005	PS Johny	Indian National Congress
2005	2007	MK Sooryaprakash	Democratic Indira Congress
2007	2010	M Vijayan	Communist Party of India
2010	2013	Subi Babu	Indian National Congress
2014	2015	P.V. Sarojini	Indian National Congress
2015	2017	Varghese Kandamkulathy	Communist Party of India (Marxist)
2017	2019	Beena Murali	Communist Party of India
2019	2020	Raphy Joseph	Independent
2020	2023	Rajasree Gopan	Communist Party of India (Marxist)
2025	Present	A Prasad	Indian National Congress

== Election results ==
=== Corporation Election 2025 ===
S.No.	Party name	Party symbol	Number of Corporators	Change
1.	UDF		33	▲11
2.	LDF		11	▼13
3.	BJP		08	▲2
4.	IND		04	▲3

== Governing Body ==
The governing body of Thrissur Municipal Corporation consists of 56 councillors, representing 56 wards of the city. The councillors are directly elected for a five-year term. In the 2025 elections, the UDF secured a majority with 33 seats.

Current Office Bearers (2025–2030)
Office	Name	Political Party	Alliance
Mayor	Dr. Niji Justin	Indian National Congress	UDF
Deputy Mayor	A. Prasad	Indian National Congress	UDF

== Current Members ==
The following is the list of wards and the respective councillors of Thrissur Municipal Corporation after the local body elections held in December 2025.

Ward No.	Ward Name	Corporation Councillor	Political Affiliation	Alliance
01	Poonkunnam	Raghunath C. Menon	BJP	NDA
02	Kuttankulangara	Anjali Rakesh	INC	UDF
03	Patturaikkal	A. V. Krishnamohan	BJP	NDA
04	Viyyur	Arun Thadathil	INC	UDF
05	Peringavu	Shari Kishorkumar	INC	UDF
06	Ramavarmapuram	T. R. Hiran	CPI(M)	LDF
07	Kuttumukku	Shibu Poruthur	INC	UDF
08	Villadam	Sindhu Thaikkadan	CPI	LDF
09	Cherur	Adv. Villy Jijo	INC	UDF
10	Gandhi Nagar	Adv. Subi Babu	INC	UDF
11	Mukkattukara	Shyamala Muralidharan	INC	UDF
12	Nettissery	Sintomol Sojan	INC	UDF
13	Mullakkara	Neethu Sumesh	INC	UDF
14	Mannuthy	Adv. Anees Ahammed T.A.	CPI(M)	LDF
15	Ollukkara	K. Gopalakrishnan	INC	UDF
16	Krishnapuram	Soumya Pratheesh	ISJD	LDF
17	Kuttanellur	Harish Mohan	INC	UDF
18	Chelakkottukara	T. R. Santhosh	INC	UDF
19	Kalathode	M. L. Rosy	Independent	LDF
20	Paravattany	Jees George	CPI(M)	LDF
21	Kizhakkumpattukara	Dr. Niji Justin	INC	UDF
22	Chembukavu	Adv. Joy Bastin Chakkola	INC	UDF
23	Mission Quarters	Baiju Varghese	INC	UDF
24	Kuriachira	Shomy Francis	Independent	OTH
25	Valarkavu	Mercy Aji	INC	UDF
26	Anchery	Smitha Aneesh	CPI(M)	LDF
27	Padavaradu	Praveenlal	INC	UDF
28	Ollur Centre	Pauly Jose	INC	UDF
29	Edakkunny	Reshmi Unnikrishnan	INC	UDF
30	Thaikattussery	Dr. Keerthana Karthikeyan	CPI(M)	LDF
31	Ollur	Caroly Joshua	INC	UDF
32	Chiyyaram South	Limna Manoj	Independent	OTH
33	Chiyyaram North	Rafi Jose	Independent	OTH
34	Kuriachira West	Jacob Pulikkottil	INC	UDF
35	Kannamkulangara	Mumdas (Chinnu)	BJP	NDA
36	Thekkinkadu	Poornima Suresh	BJP	NDA
37	Thiruvambadi	Adv. M. Reshma Menon	BJP	NDA
38	Kottappuram	Vinod Krishna	BJP	NDA
39	Poothole	P. Sukumaran	CPI(M)	LDF
40	Kokkalai	Vinshi Arunkumar	BJP	NDA
41	Vadookara	Sijith M. S.	CPI(M)	LDF
42	Koorkanchery	Ambili C. M.	INC	UDF
43	Kanimangalam	Padmini Shaji	BJP	NDA
44	Panamukku	Sheena Chandran	INC	UDF
45	Nedupuzha	Princy Rojan	INC	UDF
46	Kariattukara	K. Sumesh	INC	UDF
47	Laloor	Laly James	INC	UDF
048	ARANATTUKARA	Vibitha Vasu	INC	UDF
049	KANATTUKARA	Sunitha Vinod	CPI(M)	LDF
050	AYYANTHOLE	Valsala Baburaj	INC	UDF
051	CIVIL STATION	A. Prasad	INC	UDF
052	OLARI	Sajan C. George	INC	UDF
053	ELTHURUTH	Shaju Kundoly	CPI	LDF
054	CHETTUPUZHA	Baburaj E. S.	INC	UDF
055	PULLAZHI	Sunitha Vinu	INC	UDF
056	PUTHOORKARA	Mephi Delson	INC	UDF

== Map of Thrissur Municipal Corporation ==
Thrissur Municipal Corporation

Map of Thrissur Municipal Corporation showing the 56 divisions as per the delimitation published on 30 May 2025 (click HERE to see the official map)
Map of Thrissur Municipal Corporation showing the boundaries of all the 56 divisions, published on 30 May 2025.
1. Punkunnam (പൂങ്കുന്നം); 2. Kuttankulangara (കുട്ടംകുളങ്ങര); 3. Patturaikal (പാട്ടുരായ്കൽ); 4. Viyyur (വിയ്യൂർ); 5. Peringavu (പെരിങ്ങാവ്); 6. Ramavarmapuram (രാമവർമപുരം); 7. Kuttumukku (കുറ്റുമുക്ക്); 8. Villadam (വില്ലടം); 9. Cherur (ചേറൂർ); 10. Gandhi Nagar (ഗാന്ധി നഗർ); 11. Mukkattukara (മുക്കാട്ടുകര); 12. Nettissery (നെട്ടിശ്ശേരി); 13. Mullakkara (മുല്ലക്കര); 14. Mannuthy (മണ്ണുത്തി); 15. Ollukkara (ഒല്ലൂക്കര); 16. Nadathara (നടത്തറ); 17. Kuttanellur (കുട്ടനെല്ലൂർ); 18. Chelakkottukara (ചേലക്കോട്ടുകര); 19. Kalathodu (കാളത്തോട്); 20. Paravattani (പറവട്ടാനി)	21. Kizhakkumpattukara (കിഴക്കുമ്പാട്ടുകര); 22. Chembukkavu (ചെമ്പുക്കവ്); 23. Mission Quarters (മിഷൻ ക്വാർട്ടേർസ്); 24. Kuriachira (കുരിയച്ചിറ); 25. Valarkavu (വളർകാവ്); 26. Ancheri (അഞ്ചേരി); 27. Patavarad (പടവരാട്); 28. Ollur Centre (ഒല്ലൂർ സെന്റർ); 29. Edakkunni (എടക്കുന്നി); 30. Thaikkattussery (തൈക്കാട്ടുശ്ശേരി); 31. Cheerachy (ചീരാച്ചി); 32. Chiyyaram South (ചിയ്യാരം സൗത്ത്); 33. Chiyyaram (ചിയ്യാരം); 34. Kuriachira West (കുരിയച്ചിറ വെസ്റ്റ്); 35. Kannamkulangara (കണ്ണംകുളങ്ങര); 36. Thekkinkadu (തേക്കിൻകാട്); 37. Thiruvambady (തിരുവമ്പാടി); 38. Kottappuram (കോട്ടപ്പുറം); 39. Poothole (പൂത്തോൾ); 40. Kokkala (കൊക്കാല)	41. Vadookkara (വടൂക്കര); 42. Koorkenchery (കൂർക്കഞ്ചേരി); 43. Kanimangalam (കണിമംഗലം); 44. Panamukku (പനമുക്ക്); 45. Nedupuzha (നെടുപുഴ); 46. Kariattukara (കാര്യാട്ടുകര); 47. Laloor (ലാലൂർ); 48. Aranattukara (അരണാട്ടുകര); 49. Kanattukara (കാനാട്ടുകര); 50. Udayanagar (ഉദയനഗർ); 51. Ayyanthole (അയ്യന്തോൾ); 52. Olari (ഒളരി); 53. Elthuruth (എൽതുരുത്ത്); 54. Chettupuzha (ചേറ്റുപുഴ); 55. Pullazhi (പുല്ലഴി); 56. Puthurkara (പുതൂർക്കര)

=== Corporation Election 2020 ===
S.No.	Party name	Party symbol	Number of Corporators	Change
1.	UDF		24	▲3
2.	LDF		24	▲1
3.	BJP		06	Steady
4.	IND		01	▼4

=== 2015 local body elections ===
S.No.	Political Front/Party	Number of Councilors
1	LDF	23
2	UDF	21
3	BJP	6
4	Others	5
Total		55

== See also ==
- List of Thrissur Corporation wards
