= Ashtamangalam Siva Temple =

Hindu temple in Thrissur district, Kerala, India

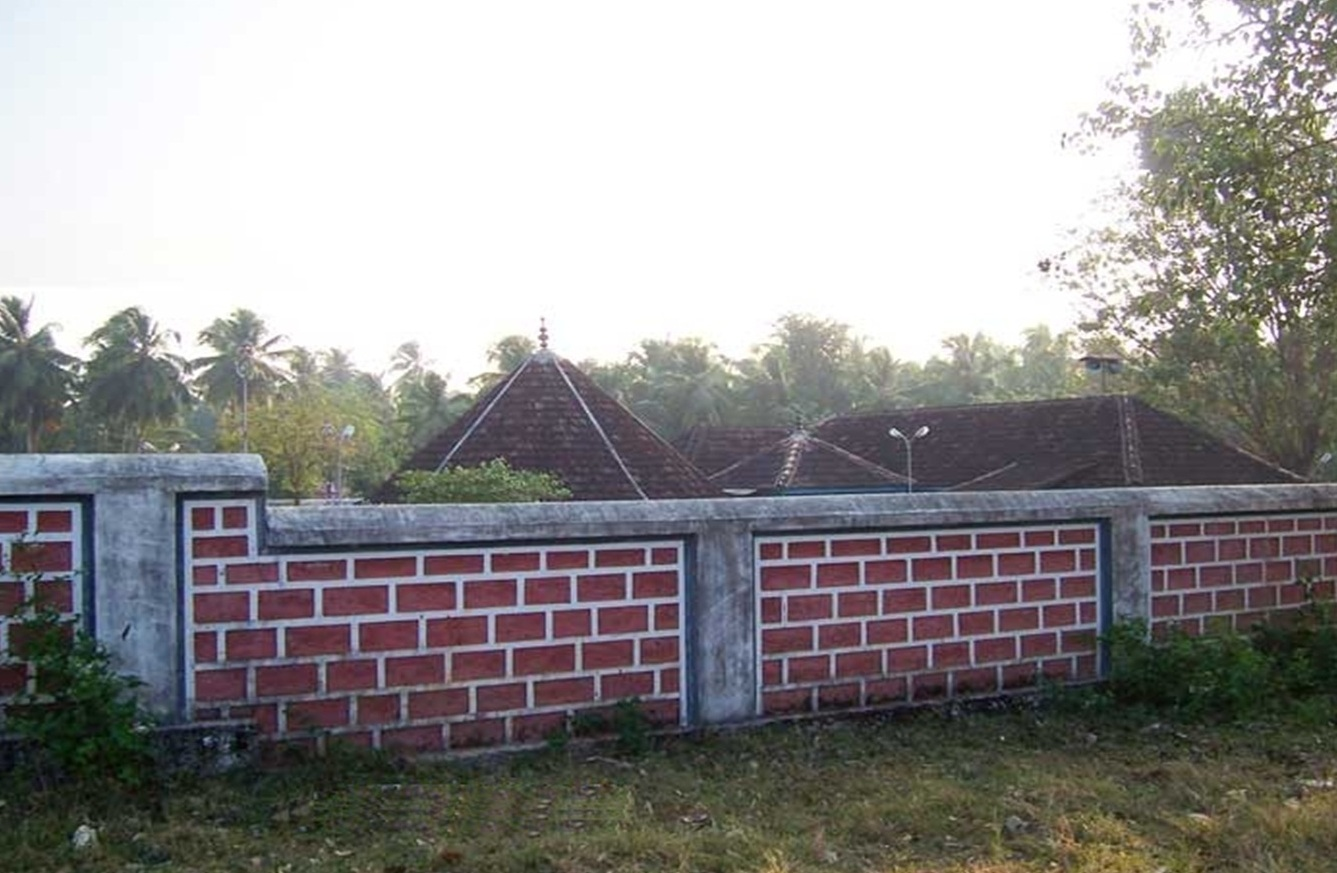
- Sreekovil

- Karyattukara, Thrissur, Kerala

Religion
- Affiliation: Hinduism
- District: Thrissur
- Deity: Shiva
- Festival: Maha Shivaratri

Location
- Location: Ashtamangalam, Karyattukara, Thrissur City
- State: Kerala
- Country: India
- Interactive map of Ashtamangalam Siva Temple
- Coordinates: 10.508843°N 76.180449°E

Architecture
- Type: Kerala style
- Completed: Not known

Specifications
- Temple: One
- Monument: 1
- Elevation: 28.39 m (93 ft)

Ashtamangalam Siva Temple is located in the city of Thrissur at Ashtamangalam in Thrissur district. The presiding deity of the temple is Shiva, located in separate sanctum sanatoriums, facing east. It is believed that this temple is one of the 108 Shiva temples of Kerala and is installed by sage Parasurama dedicated to Shiva. The temple is located near Karyattukara on the Laloor road. Shivarathri festival of the temple celebrates in the Malayalam month of Kumbha (February - March).

== See also ==
- 108 Shiva Temples
- Temples of Kerala
