= Keezha Sarakkalvilai =

Village in Tamil Nadu, India

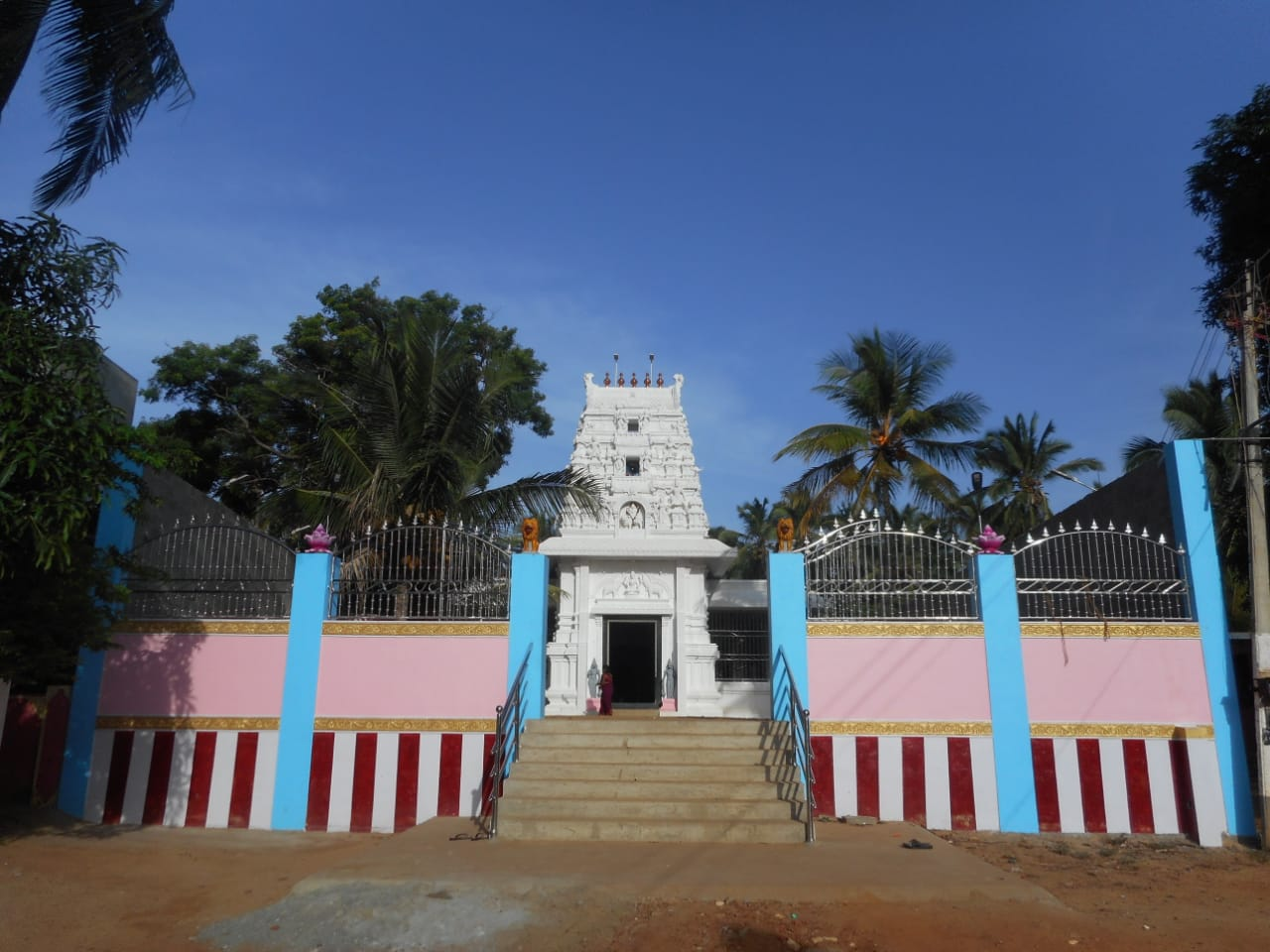
Citadel and White Tower of Arulmigu Bathirakali Amman Temple.

Keezha Sarakkalvilai is a small village in Kanniyakumari district in the Indian state of Tamil Nadu with Indian postal code 629002. It is an important pilgrimage and the site of the famous Bathirakali Amman Temple.

== Name description ==
The name Keezha Sarakkalvilai is referencing its nature of soil condition. In Tamil grammar, the word "Keezha" is described as two different meanings. One is East (Direction indicator word) second is Base (Inner layer of Earth). The village Keezha Sarakkalvilai is geographically situated on the east side of a neighborhood village named Sarakkalvilai. "Sarakkal" is described the opacity of that soil. In Keezha Sarakkalvilai, the bottom floor or the inner layer of earth is naturally located with Gravel soil (Red soil + White soil + Small stones = Gravel soil தமிழில்: சரளை மண்). "Vilai" is describing an English word "Garden" (Garden = A prosperous land surface or Land that produces many types of crops). These are the main reason, to name as Keezha Sarakkalvilai for this village.

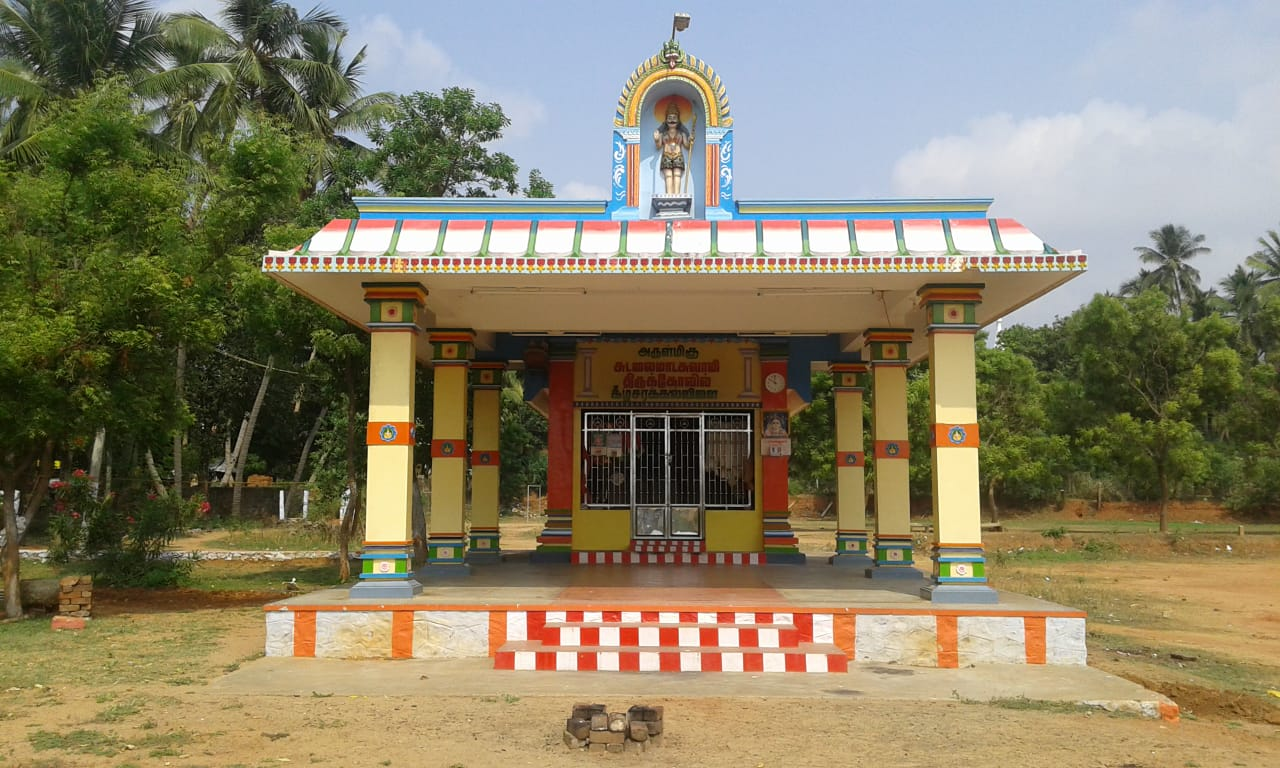
A prosperous sight of Arulmigu Sudalaimada Swamy Temple.

The equation of the village name is, KEEZHA (EAST) + SARAKKAL (GRAVEL SOIL) + VILAI (GARDEN) = KEEZHA SARAKKALVILAI (தமிழில்: சரக்கல்விளை)

== Geography ==
Keezha Sarakkalvilai is a village situated in the southernmost district of Kanyakumari in Tamil Nadu State, India. It is 17 km (11 mi) from Kanyakumari beach and 5 km (3.1 mi) from Nagercoil town 70 km (43 mi) from the adjacent Tirunelveli district and approximately 85 km (53 mi) from Trivandrum city. The village of Keezha Sarakkalvilai is renowned for the Bathirakali Amman Temple and was an important citadel of Kanniyakumari district.

The Bathirakali Amman temple (தமிழில்: பத்திரகாளி அம்மன் கோவில்) is unique in the whole of India in that it is dedicated to the virgin adolescent girl named Bathirakali. The sanctum and is called Arulmigu Bathirakali Amman kovil. The temple is 100 and above years of old.

== Location ==
Keezha Sarakkalvilai is about 17 km (11 mi) from Kanyakumari and about 5 km (3.1 mi) from Nagercoil lying between these two towns. Buses ply from Thirunelveli, Kanyakumari, and Trivandrum. The nearest railway station is Nagercoil on the Trivandrum - Kanyakumari section of the Southern Railway.

== Language ==
Tamil is the official language and mother tongue for Keezha Sarakkalvilai people. The Tamil spoken here is a mix of Malayalam, sometimes unintelligible to the people of North and West Tamil Nadu. The culture also a mixture of Tamil and Malayalam traditions. Hinduism is the major religion in this village.

== Food ==
Food prepared here is also a mix of Tamil Nadu/Kerala traditions. Puttu, Aappam, Idiaappam are popular food items and so are Suthu murukku, Achu murukku, Munthiri kothu, Palakaram, Black gram Rice (Ulunthanchoru) and Fish curry. Curries here are made with coconut and coconut oil, which is now considered Kerala style cooking.

== Family god ==
The family god of Keezha Sarakkalvilai people is Bathirakali Amman. Bathirakali is goddess Parvathy in the form of an adolescent girl child. Devi is also known as Devi Baala, Devi Bhadra, Devi Baala Parameshwari, Vada Bathirakali (North facing Deity), Devi Bhagavathy. She is popularly known as "Bathirakali" or "Devi" (The Tamil word "Devi" indicating an adolescent girl with virginity. தமிழில்: கன்னித்தன்மையே உரித்தான இளம்பெண்.) She is also worshiped as Devi Durgai by devotees. The people of Keezha Sarakkalvilai are popularly known her as "Periyammai" with devotion. The goddess Bathirakali is believed to be the one who removes the rigidity of our mind; devotees usually feel the tears in their eyes or even in their mind when they pray to the goddess in devotion and contemplation.

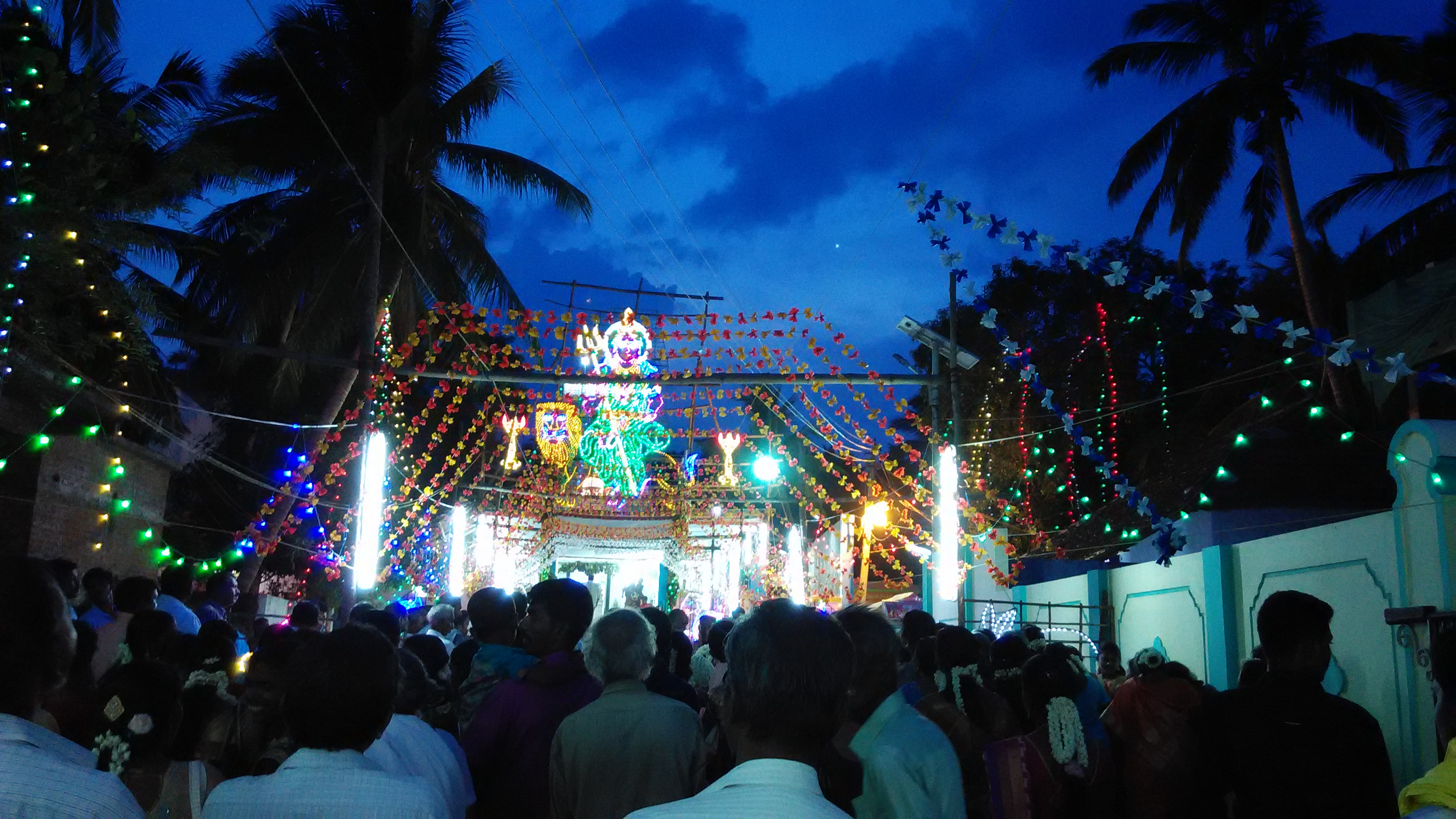
Chithirai Festival Saturday evening.

== Festivals ==
There are four important festivals, one in Chithirai (Exclusively for Bathirakali Amman) தமிழில்: சித்திரை திருவிழா. Second is in Aadi (For Bathirakali Amman & Sudalaimada Swamy) தமிழில்: ஆடி திருவிழா. The third is in Purattasi (Navarathri vizha- Nine nights) தமிழில்: நவராத்திரி விழா. The Fourth is in Karthigai (Specially for Bathirakali Amman) தமிழில்: கார்த்திகை திருவிழா. During the Chithirai festival, on the third weekend is celebrated grandly in every year for the goddess Bathirakali Amman. And also they will celebrate Pongal and Deepavali very well every year.

== Population and literacy ==
As of 2011 India census, Keezha Sarakkalvilai had a population of 266. Males constitute 49% of the population and females 51%. Keezha Sarakkalvilai has an average literacy rate of 92%, higher than the state average of 80.09%: male literacy is 89%, and female literacy is 84%. In Keezha Sarakkalvilai, 4% of the population are under 6 years of age.

== Agriculture ==
The main crops cultivated in Keezha Sarakkalvilai are Coconut, Banana, and Tapioca. The honourable Thiruvithancore king Mr. Rama Varman built government irrigation canals that have been shut down by the regular human activities. However, the few interested people and landlords of Keezha Sarakkalvilai continue independently maintaining their lands. As consequence, the village continues to produce crops.

== Administration ==
- Mr. K. Sivan - Head Chair
- Mr. N. Anand - Vice Head Chair
- Mr. N. Muthukrishnan - Secretary
- Mr. K. Ravikumar - Treasurer

== List of Temples ==
- Arulmigu Bathirakali Amman Temple
- Arulmigu Sudalaimadan Swamy Temple
- Ayya Narayana Swamy Temple
- Arulmigu Poojaipirai Bathirakali Amman Temple

== Neighborhoods ==
- Sarakkalvilai
- Vetha nagar
- Velladichivilai
- Kannankulam

== Notable people ==
- K. Sivan - space scientist and former chief at ISRO

== Recent Event ==
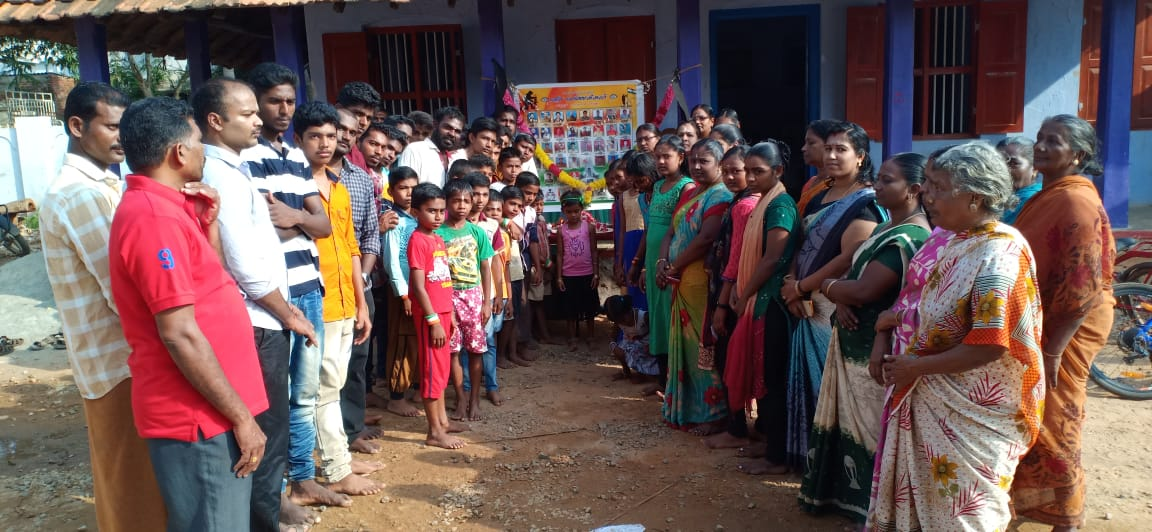
A group pose on salute day.

On 17 February 2019, a tribute was conducted by the people of Keezha Sarakkalvilai village for the Heroic death of 44 CRPF men at Pulwama terror attack.
