= I. P. Paul =

Indian politician (born 1949)

I.P. Paul
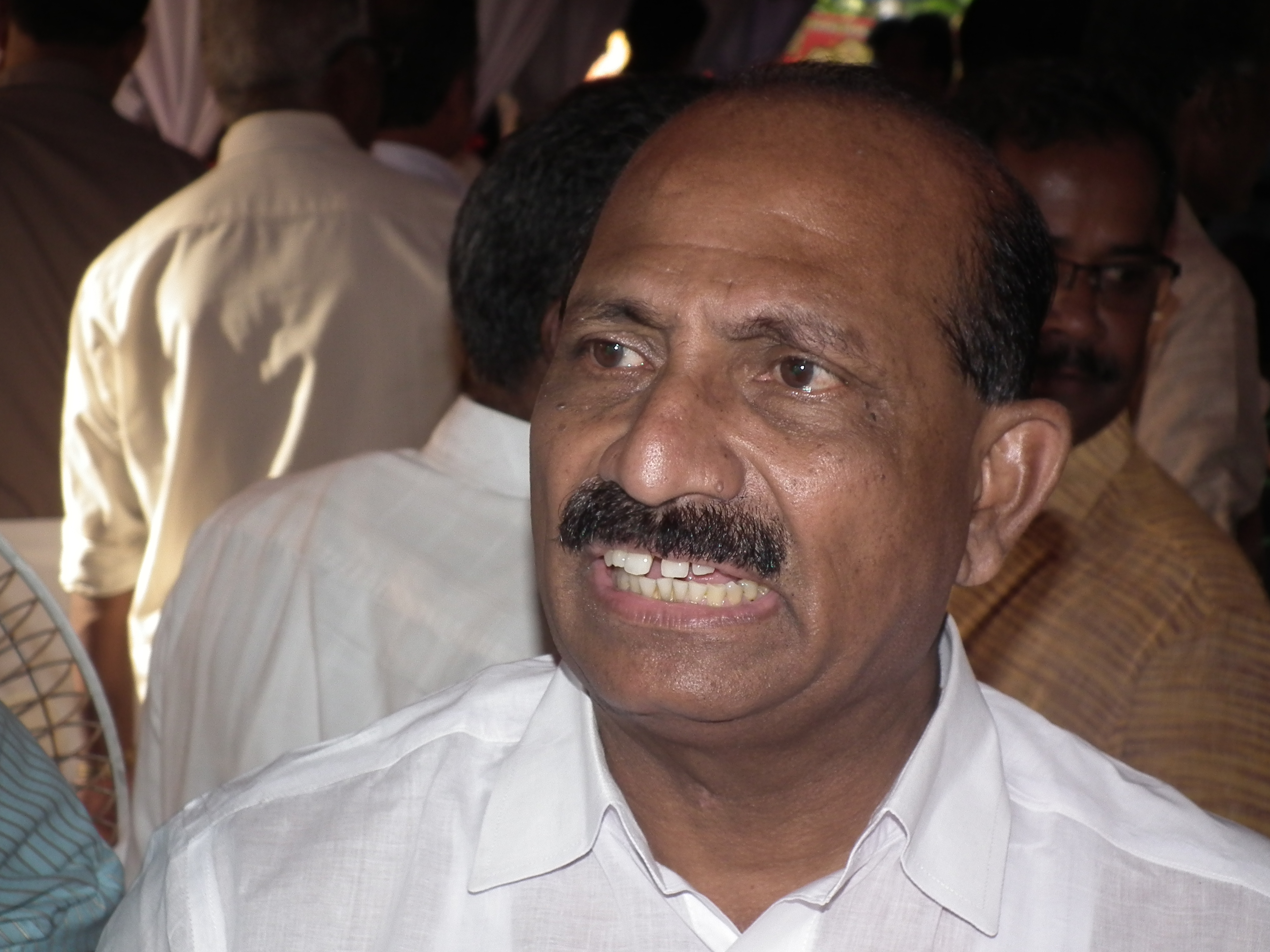

Mayor of Thrissur
- In office 9 November 2010 – 14 January 2013
- Preceded by: R. Bindu
- Succeeded by: Rajan Pallan
- Constituency: Ward No 16, Kalathodu

Personal details
- Born: 5 April 1949 (age 77) Thrissur
- Party: Indian National Congress

I.P. Paul is an Indian National Congress politician from Thrissur city, India. He was the fourth mayor of Thrissur Municipal Corporation.
