= Ajitha Jayarajan =

Indian politician

Mayor of Thrissur
- In office 19 November 2015 – 12 December 2018
- Preceded by: Rajan Pallan
- Succeeded by: Ajitha Vijayan
- In office 20 February 2020 – 11 November 2020
- Preceded by: Ajitha Vijayan
- Constituency: Ward No 35, Kokkale

Personal details
- Born: 2 October 1965 (age 60) Thrissur
- Party: Communist Party of India (Marxist)

Ajitha Jayarajan is a Communist Party of India (Marxist) politician from Thrissur city, India. In November 2015 she became the sixth mayor of Thrissur Municipal Corporation.
