= Vadookara =

Vadookara വടൂക്കര
- Town
- Location in Kerala Location in India
- Coordinates: 10.50°N 76.20°E
- Country: India
- State: Kerala
- District: Thrissur

Languages
  - Official: Malayalam, English
- Time zone: UTC+5:30 (IST)
- Postal code: 680007
- Vehicle registration: KL-8

Vadookara (വടൂക്കര) is a residential area in southwest Thrissur, Kerala state, India. It is closer to the city starting from Koorkenchery and extending towards Nedupuzha and Aranattukara.Vadookara is the 40th ward of Thrissur Corporation. The size of the area is about 4.45 square kilometer.

== Demographics ==
Malayalam is the Local Language of Vadookara.

== How To Reach ==
=== By Rail ===
Thrissur Railway station is the nearest railway station from Vadookara.

== See also ==
Banking and finance sector

Vadookara has a running branch of Koorkenchery Service Cooperative bank.

Educational Institution

Guruvijayam lower primary school is the only Educational Institution in the region.

== Social Media ==
1. Vadookara Facebook Community
