= M K Varghese =

9th Mayor of Thrissur

9th Mayor of Thrissur
- Preceded by: Ajitha Jayarajan
- Succeeded by: Dr. Niji Justin

Personal details
- Born: 4 June 1956 (age 70) Mannuthy, Thrissur
- Spouse: Lissy Varghese

M K Varghese (born 4 June 1956) is the ninth mayor of Thrissur city, Kerala. He represented the 16th division of Nettissery of Thrissur Municipal Corporation as an independent candidate.

== Early and personal life ==
Verghese entered public life after retiring from the Indian Army, where he served from 1975 to 1986. His political journey began in earnest following a grassroots struggle to ensure clean drinking water for residents near his home.

This initiative led to the formation of a Janasevana Samithi (public service committee), where he served as president. His leadership grew through the ranks, eventually becoming the district president of ACTS (Action for Community Transformation Society).

Verghese's early political career was with the Indian National Congress, winning as a councillor in 2000 and 2010. However, after being denied a ticket in the latest election, he contested independently and secured the mayoralty. He hails from the Menachery family and is the eldest of five children of the late Kochappu and Mary. He also served as the former executive director of Jawahar Bal Bhavan Thrissur.
