= Villadam =

Villadam is a residential area situated in the City of Thrissur in Kerala state of India. Villadam is Ward 9 of Thrissur Municipal Corporation.

== Education ==
Villadam has a Government Higher Secondary School, it was established in 1906. The founder of the school was Ittyanath Kittunni Menon who was from the Ittyanath family in Villadam. Kittunni Menon built the school on his family land and initially it had two buildings housing the classrooms. The school was later handed over to the Princely State of Cochin which was in effect headed by his brother in law Rama Varma XV family. The school was a co-educational institution from its start in 1906 which was a rarity in then Kerala.

Today the school is among the two schools selected from the Thrissur Legislative Assembly Constituency to be developed into one of international standard by the Government of Kerala. As a step towards this a new academic block's foundation was laid in presence of V. S. Sunil Kumar the Minister for Agriculture and the MLA of Thrissur in 2018.

== See also ==
- Thrissur
- Thrissur District
- List of Thrissur Corporation wards
