= P. Balachandran (politician) =

Indian politician

Member of the Kerala Legislative Assembly for Thrissur
- In office 24 May 2021 – 23 May 2026
- Preceded by: V.S. Sunil Kumar
- Succeeded by: Rajan J. Pallan

Personal details
- Born: Anthikad
- Party: Communist Party of India
- Education: S.N College Nattika & Sree Kerala Varma College, Thrissur

P. Balachandran is an Indian politician who served as the MLA of Thrissur Constituency from May 2021 to May 2026.
