= Thrissur Corporation Electricity Department =

Indian electricity distribution utility

The Thrissur Corporation Electricity Department (TCED) is the electricity distribution utility owned and operated by the Thrissur Municipal Corporation in Kerala, India. It is one of the few municipal bodies in the state that directly manages power distribution within its jurisdiction. TCED supplies electricity to domestic, commercial, and industrial consumers within the municipal limits, covering an area of approximately 12.63 km² and serving around 36,000 connections..

Thrissur Municipal Corporation and TCED are separate entities and the TCED is run on a commercial basis. The municipal corporation purchases power in bulk from the Kerala State Electricity Board (KSEB). The budget for this operation, however, is separately prepared and is not included in the annual municipal corporation budget. The separate books of accounts of the operation are also kept under the cash-based system.

== History ==
The origins of the Thrissur Corporation Electricity Department trace back to 19 August 1937, when the then‑Thrissur Municipality began operating its own electricity distribution system following a formal declaration by the Maharaja of Cochin. The municipality entered the power sector by purchasing the generation and distribution business of the Cochin State Power & Light Corporation Ltd. for ₹5.8 lakh, marking the city’s first major step toward independent electricity management.

A significant transition occurred in April 1947, when the Government of the Maharaja of Cochin assumed control of the “Trichur Power House,” which had previously supplied electricity to the municipality. A formal agreement was executed under which the municipality was recognized as the sole distribution licensee for the town, while the government committed to supplying bulk power. This arrangement laid the foundation for the municipality’s long‑standing autonomy in electricity distribution.

Even after the formation of the Kerala State Electricity Board (KSEB), Thrissur retained its unique position as a deemed distribution licensee under subsequent electricity laws. In 1972, the municipal limits expanded with the addition of areas from surrounding panchayats, although the electricity department’s operational jurisdiction remained largely confined to the original 12.65 km² urban core.

A major administrative milestone came on 1 October 2000, when Thrissur Municipality was upgraded to a Municipal Corporation, leading to the renaming of the department as the Thrissur Corporation Electricity Department (TCED). The department continued to modernize its infrastructure and operations, achieving 100% electrification of its service area on 30 April 2010. Today, TCED functions as a commercially independent entity with its own budget and accounting system, operating a network that includes more than 600 distribution transformers along with its own 110 kV and 33 kV substations.

== Power Procurement ==
TCED purchases electricity in bulk from the Kerala State Electricity Board (KSEB). The purchased power is then distributed through the department’s network of substations, transformers, and distribution lines.

- Tariffs for end‑users follow the structure approved by the Kerala State Electricity Regulatory Commission (KSERC).
