= Thrissur KSRTC bus station =

Bus station in Kerala, India

Thrissur KSRTC bus station തൃശ്ശൂര്‍ കേരള സ്റ്റേറ്റ് റോഡ് ട്രാൻസ്പോർട്ട് കോർപ്പറേഷൻ ബസ്‌ സ്റ്റേഷൻ
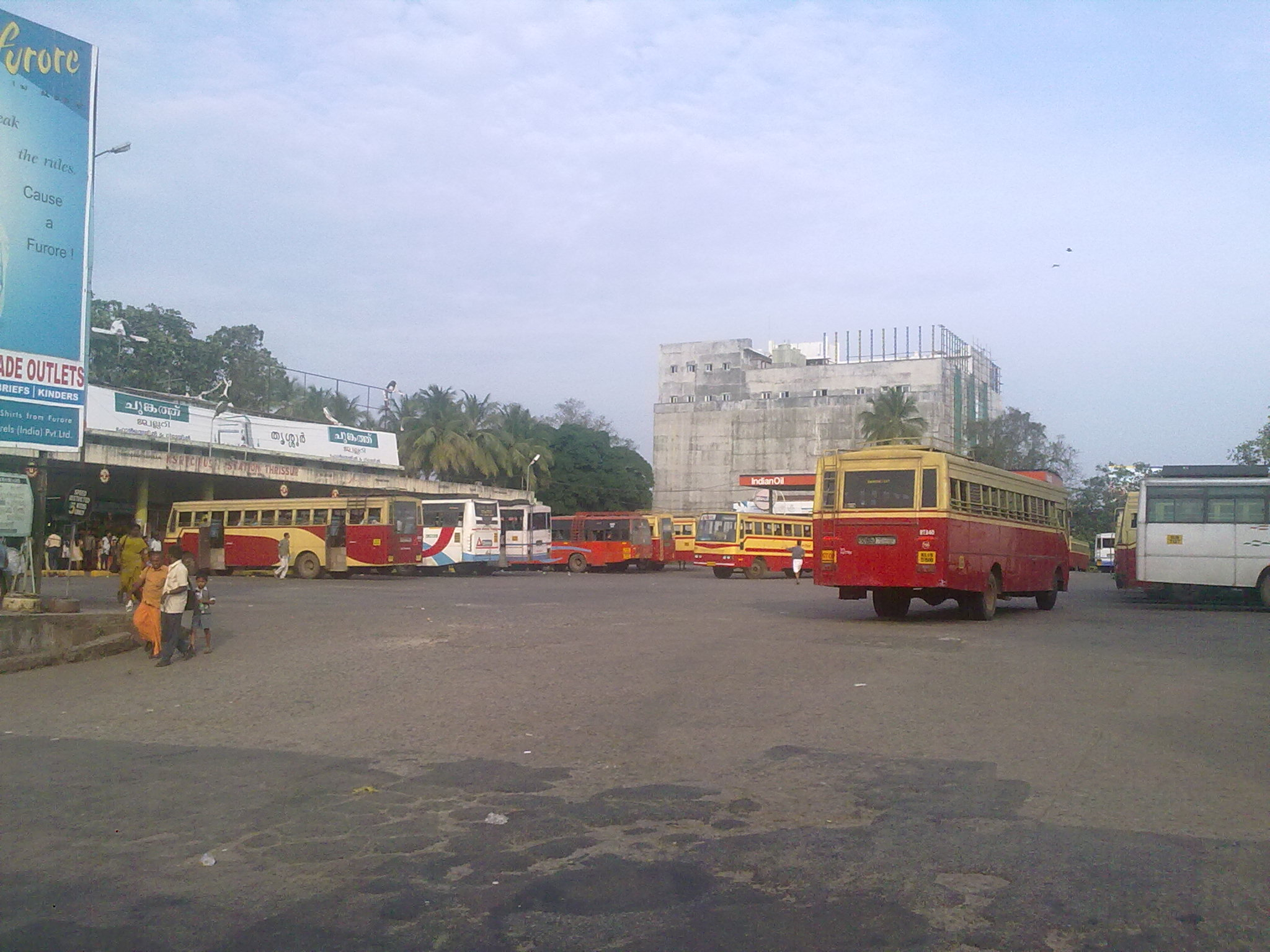
- Entrance of Thrissur KSRTC bus station

General information
- Location: Kokkalai, Thrissur, Kerala; India
- Coordinates: 10.51753°N 76.210431°E
- System: Bus station
- Owner: Kerala State Road Transport Corporation (KSRTC)
- Operator: KSRTC
- Platforms: 15 Bus bays
- Tracks: 12

Construction
- Structure type: At Grade
- Platform levels: 1
- Parking: Yes

Other information
- Station code: TSR
- Fare zone: Central Zone, Thrissur

Services
84
Location

Thrissur KSRTC bus station is a state-owned Kerala State Road Transport Corporation (KSRTC) bus station in Kokkalai in the heart of the Thrissur City, India. The bus station is very near to the Thrissur railway station. It is one of the principal hubs of the KSRTC in central Kerala due to its strategic location and has bus services linking southern, central and northern parts of the state.

== Overview ==
The bus station runs long distance, inter-state and city services. It is a particularly important station because of its strategic location on the major NH 66 and NH 544. It is also the centre most station is the state thus having easiest access in the state to all the major cities in Kerala and South India. There is an online reservation counter at Thrissur bus station.

== Modernisation plans ==
Kerala Government is rebuilding the bus station at a cost of Rs 50 crore. This modern bus station will be built on BoT basis. The new bus station can accommodate around three thousand buses in one day. Around 100 buses can also be parked in the bus station according to the new plans.
