= Mullakkara =

Mullakkara is a residential area situated in the City of Thrissur in Kerala state of India. Mullakkara is Ward 13 of Thrissur Municipal Corporation.

== See also ==
- Thrissur
- Thrissur District
- List of Thrissur Corporation wards
