= Jose Kattukkaran =

Indian politician (1931/1932 – 2024)

Mayor of Thrissur
- In office 5 October 2000 – 3 April 2004
- Succeeded by: K. Radhakrishnan

Personal details
- Born: 1931/1932 Trichur, Kingdom of Cochin, India
- Died: 5 May 2024 (aged 92) Thrissur, Kerala, India
- Party: Indian National Congress

Jose Kattukkaran (1931/1932 – 5 May 2024) was an Indian National Congress politician from Thrissur City, India, and was the first mayor of Thrissur Municipal Corporation when it was raised to the present status in 2000. He was in office from 5 October 2000, to 3 April 2004. He died on 5 May 2024, at the age of 92.
