= Kanimangalam Sastha Temple =

Religion
- Affiliation: Hinduism
- District: Thrissur District
- Deity: Ayyappan
- Festival: Thrissur Pooram

Location
- Location: City of Thrissur
- State: Kerala
- Country: India
- Interactive map of Kanimangalam Sastha Temple

Architecture
- Type: Kerala

Kanimangalam Sastha Temple is Hindu temple situated in Kanimangalam, Thrissur City of Kerala, India. Lord Shasta is the main deity of the temple. Kanimangalam Sastha is the main participant of the famous Thrissur Pooram. Kanimangalam Sastha is the first Pooram entering the Vadakkunnathan Temple. Kanimangalam Sastha is the protector of all goddesses who take part in Thrissur Pooram.

The presiding deity is sastha, although is worshipped as Brihaspati, the preceptor of gods.

As the sastha is first to reach Vadakkumnathan temple, he has responsibility to check facilities for other Poorams
