= Chembukkavu =

Chembukkavu (Chembookavu or Chembukavu) is a residential area situated in the City of Thrissur in Kerala state of India. Chembukkavu is Ward 6 of Thrissur Municipal Corporation.Famous for housing the Thrissur Zoo, Chembukkavu is a bustling urban area part of the Thrissur city. Chembukkavu Bhagavathy Temple also takes part in the Thrissur Pooram making it a site of pilgrimage for people from all parts of Kerala during the months of April and May.

== Toponymy ==
Chembukkavu takes its name from the Nambudiri family's mana(Illam)with the same name. It stood on Mana Lane before it was demolished in 2011.

== Notable people ==
Biju Menon Popular Indian Movie Personality. Rajan Pallan Former Mayor Thrissur. Bhavana Popular Indian Movie Personality.

== See also ==
- Thrissur
- Thrissur District
- List of Thrissur Corporation wards
