= Ajitha Vijayan =

Indian politician

Mayor of Thrissur
- In office 12 December 2018 – 28 January 2020
- Preceded by: Ajitha Jayarajan
- Succeeded by: Ajitha Jayarajan
- Constituency: Ward No 42, Kanimangalam

Personal details
- Born: Thrissur
- Party: Communist Party of India
- Children: 1

Ajitha Vijayan is a Communist Party of India politician from Thrissur city, India. She is the seventh mayor of Thrissur Municipal Corporation.
