= Krishnapuram, Thrissur =

Krishnapuram is a residential area situated in the City of Thrissur in the Kerala state of India. Krishnapuram is Ward 19 of Thrissur Municipal Corporation.

== See also ==
- Thrissur District
- List of Thrissur Corporation wards
