= Kuttumuck Siva Temple =

Hindu temple in Kerala, India

- Mahadeva Temple, Kuttumuck, Thrissur, Kerala

Religion
- Affiliation: Hinduism
- District: Thrissur
- Deity: Mahadeva
- Festival: Maha Shivaratri

Location
- Location: Kuttumuck
- State: Kerala
- Country: India
- Interactive map of Kuttumuck Siva Temple
- Coordinates: 10.548995°N 76.240335°E

Architecture
- Type: Architecture of Kerala

Specifications
- Temple: One
- Elevation: 33.28 m (109 ft)

Kuttumuck Siva Temple, the abode of Lord Kuttumuck Sree Mahadevan, is located about 5 km northeast of Thrissur. According to the legends, the idol worshipped here is more than 300 years old. But there are no historical records to establish it. The name 'Kuttumuck' is believed to have evolved from Kutti Muck.

== History ==
The idol worshipped here is known as "Kiratha Moorthi", an especially fierce and potent incarnation of Shiva. It was in this form that the lord tested Arjuna's devotion, by appearing as a hunter and challenging him to a duel. Impressed by Arjuna's dedication, Shiva gave him the celestial weapon "Pasupathastra". According to a popular lore, once the army of Mysore, led by Tipu Sultan, attacked the Kuttumucku temple. When they were about to breach the premises, a swarm of bees appeared out of nowhere and attacked them, forcing them to retreat. The temple was thus left unharmed.

== Upadevas ==
=== Ganapathy ===
In most of the temples in Kerala, Ganapathy is a regular fixture as an upadeva of the main installation. In Kuttumuck Temple, the Ganapathy shrine is situated within the Nalambalam or the inner edifice, at the south-western corner. Earlier, the pathway to this shrine was narrow and it was difficult for the devotees to walk around the shrine. However, recent renovation has widened the area facilitating easy access.

=== Swami Ayyappan ===
On the southern side of the temple, outside the Nalambalam and adjacent to the pradikshinavazhy is the shrine of Sastha. This is the first shrine one would come across outside the Nalambalam. There is a big granite stone in front of the shrine, placed in an inclined position, used in the ritual of breaking coconuts, considered very dear to Sastha. A small deepasthambam is there in front of the shrine. During the mandala season, lot of devotees take darshan at this shrine. In front of the shrine arrangements are made for "malayidal" and "kettunira" for Sabarimala pilgrimage during Mandala season.

=== Lord Mahavishnu ===
Though this is outside the nalambalam, it is not considered as updevatha. In fact, it is considered equal in importance with Lord Shiva shrine. Because of that reason you can see additional compound wall and balikkallu exclusively for Mahavishnu. This is situated at the southern side facing west.

== Festivals ==
=== Utsavam Pallivetta ===
Kuttumuck, the utsavam lasts for ten days. Kodiyettam, (beginning day of Utsavam) happens such that the Aarattu happens on Thiruvathira (lunar) star in the Malayalm month Kumbam (February–March), it ends after the Aarattu on the 10th day. Religiously, it is the restoration of divine Chaithanya. Dravyakalasam / Brahmakalasam is preceded by the Utsavam. It is aimed at the purification and energisation of the powers of the deity. It is the last of the long series of rituals of kalasam and at the end, the flag will be hoisted (Kodiyettam) heralding the Utsavam.

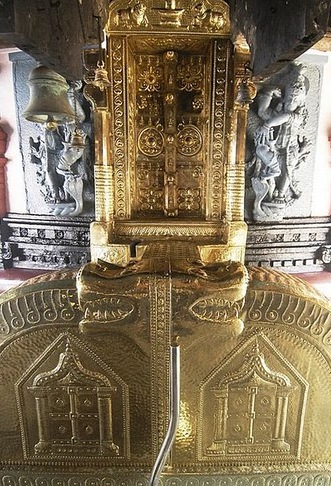
Kuttumuck sri mahadeva temple

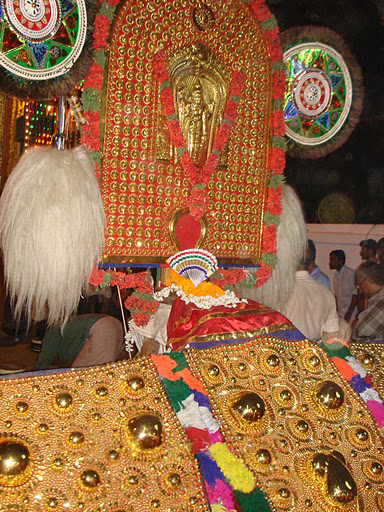
Kuttumuck pooram

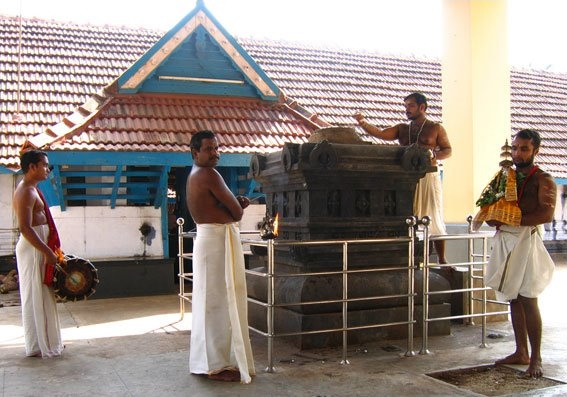
Kuttumuck sri mahadeva temple siveli
