= Chelakkottukara =

Residential area in Thrissur, Kerala, India

Coordinates: 10°31′N 76°14′E

Chelakkottukara is a residential area situated in the City of Thrissur in Kerala state of India. Chelakkottukara is Ward 21 of Thrissur Municipal Corporation. Important locations: Jubilee Mission Medical college, Thope Stadium, Mar Aprem Church, St. Thomas H.S.S Thope, Seventh Day Adventist Senior Secondary School, Mar Thimotheus High School.
