= Vadookkara =

Vadookkara is a residential area situated in the City of Thrissur in Kerala state of India. Vadookkara is Ward 40 of Thrissur Municipal Corporation.

== See also ==
- Thrissur
- Thrissur District
