= Mukkattukara =

Human settlement in India

Mukkattukara is a residential area situated in the city of Thrissur, in the Kerala state of India. Mukkattukara is Ward 11 of Thrissur Municipal Corporation. Three schools are situated in Mukkattukara: Bethlehem Convent higher secondary school, St. Geoege's UP school, and St. George's LP school.

== See also ==
- Thrissur
- Thrissur District
- List of Thrissur Corporation wards
