= Municipal Corporation Building, Thrissur =

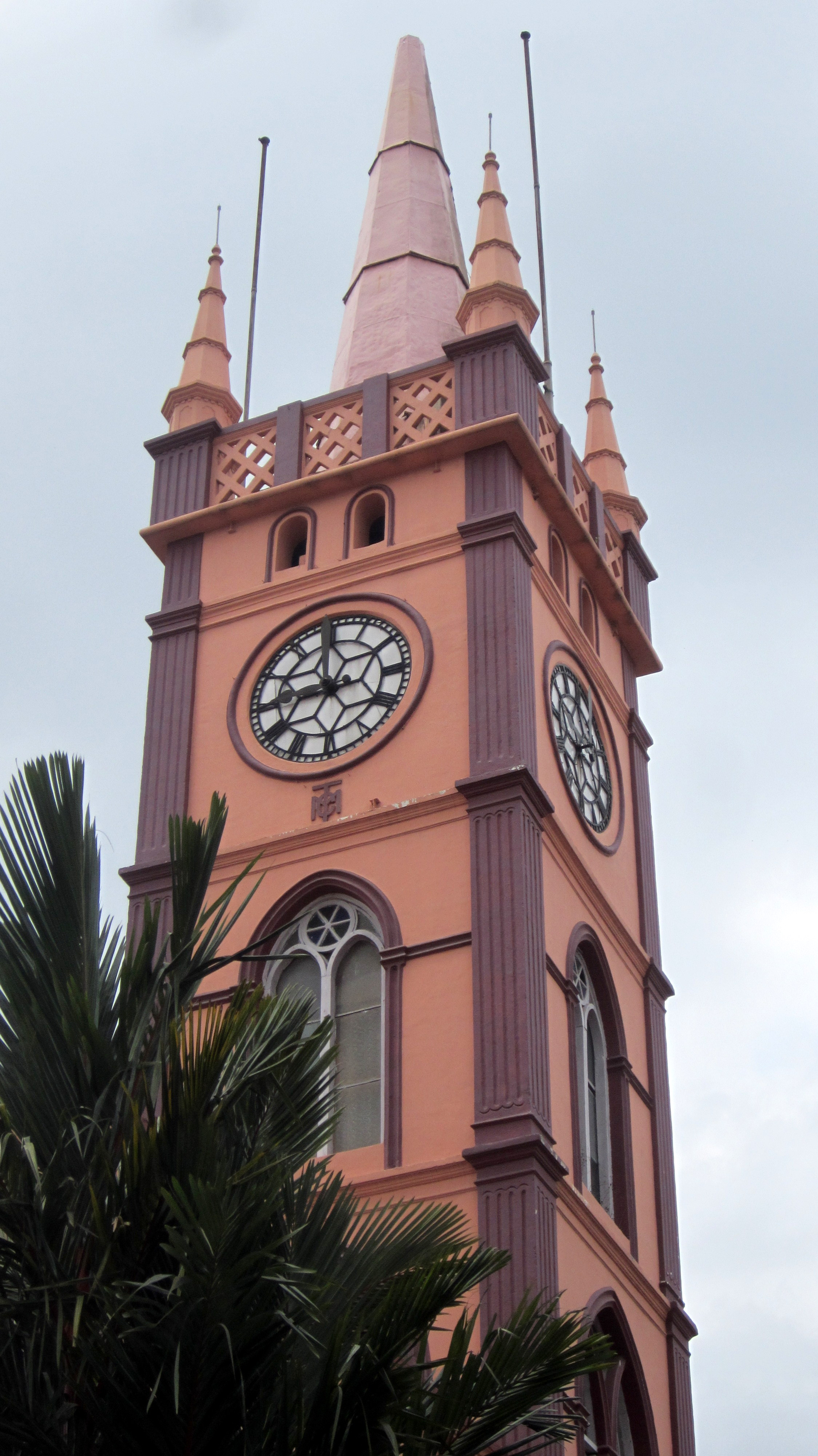
- Thrissur Municipal Corporation building seen from M.O. Road, Thrissur

General information
- Architectural style: British architecture style
- Location: Thrissur, India
- Construction started: 7 July 1932
- Completed: 1932
- Client: Thrissur Municipality

The Municipal Corporation Building, Thrissur, is the seat of the Thrissur Municipal Corporation and is situated in the middle of Thrissur city, Kerala, India. It was established in 1921, initially operating from a two‑room office in the Government Guest House on Shoranur Road before laying the foundation for a dedicated municipal building on 7 July 1932. The new four‑storey building designed in a restrained British‑colonial style was inaugurated on 29 December 1932 by Diwan J. W. U. Bor and sits prominently beside the Vadakkunnathan Temple. Its symmetrical plaster facade features regularly spaced sash windows, modest pilasters, and a continuous cornice, while a distinctive central clock tower houses a Westminster Quarters chiming clock imported from Madras.

== History ==
Thrissur Municipality came into existence in 1921 and the first council was elected near the Paramekkavu Bagavathi Temple pond. In the same year, municipal council decided to shift its office to a two room in the Government Guest house in Shoranur Road. In 1932, 7 July, Dewan C.G. Herbert laid the foundation stone for the new municipal building near the Vadakkunnathan Temple. On 29 December, then Dewan of Kochi, J.W.U. Bor inaugurated the new municipal building. The building was designed in the British architecture style. The main attraction of the building was Westminster Quarters chiming clock. This was installed by P.OOR Sons in Madras. The clock has a mechanical key system which has to be keyed every day. The clock was made from copper. It was M.R. Menon, then the Chairman of municipality who brought the clock from Madras.

== Architecture ==
The Thrissur Municipal Corporation Building, completed in 1932, is a four‑storey British‑colonial style edifice raised on Municipal Office Road beside Vadakkunnathan Temple. Its symmetrical plaster‑finished facade is articulated by evenly spaced rectangular fenestration across each level, unified by a continuous cornice line and modest pilasters framing the windows.
