= Paravattani =

Residential area in Thrissur

Paravattani is a residential area situated in the City of Thrissur in Kerala state of India. Paravattani is Ward 17 of Thrissur Municipal Corporation. Paravattani is situated near mannuthy

== See also ==
- Thrissur
- Thrissur District
- List of Thrissur Corporation wards
