= Kuriachira =

Kuriachira Thonikund
- Ward
- Location in Kerala, India
- Coordinates: 10°30′10″N 76°13′25″E
- Country: India
- State: Kerala
- District: Thrissur

Government
  - Body: Municipal Corporation

Languages
  - Official: Malayalam, English
- Time zone: UTC+5:30 (IST)
- PIN: 680006
- Telephone code: +91-487- 225
- Vehicle registration: KL-08
- Nearest city: Thrissur
- Literacy: 100%%
- Civic agency: Municipal Corporation
- Climate: Tropical (Köppen)
- Website: http://www.kuriachira.com/

Kuriachira is a municipal ward in Thrissur, Kerala. It is located within 2 km south of Swaraj Round. It lies beside the Thalore bypass road. Kuriachira is 25th division of Thrissur Municipal Corporation. It is an important residential area of Thrissur city of Kerala state of India. Renowned Malayalam writer and feminist Sara Joseph was born here. Award-winning novel "Aalahayude Penmakkal" by Sara Joseph gives insight into the life, taste, history, people and linguatone of Kuriachira.

== Education ==
- St. Joseph's Model Higher Secondary School
- St.Paul's Convent English Higher Secondary School
- Pope John Primary School
- Mar Thimotheus Higher Secondary School
- St.Joseph's Teacher Training Institute.
- Several Kindergartens.
- St.Paul's Public School (Affiliated to CBSE), Kuriachira
- Little Orchids Playschool, Ollur
