= Peringavu =

Coordinates: 10°33′N 76°13′E

Peringavu is a residential area situated in the City of Thrissur in Kerala state of India. Peringavu is Ward 5 of Thrissur Municipal Corporation.

Sree Dhanwantari Temple at Peringavu is another old Dhanvantari temple situated on the outskirts of Thrissur town in Kerala. The sanctum sanctorum of the temple is built in round shape with 2 storeys, which is a rare design unlike other Kerala style architecture. Lord Ganpathy, Goddess Lakshmi, and Lord Ayyappan are other deities enshrined in the temple.

== See also ==
- Thrissur
- Thrissur District
- List of Thrissur Corporation wards
