= Edakkunni =

Edakkunni is a residential area situated in the City of Thrissur in Kerala state of India. Edakkunni is Ward 28 of Thrissur Municipal Corporation.
