= Ollukkara =

Ollukara
- Neighbourhood
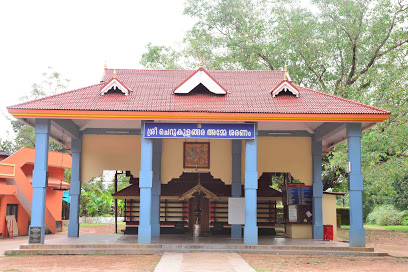
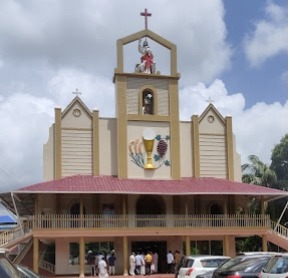
- Cherukulangara temple in Ollukkara St. Joseph's Syro Malabar Catholic church in Ollukkara

- Location in Kerala, India Ollukara (India)
- Coordinates: 10.529831°N 76.253521°E
- Country: India
- State: Kerala
- District: Thrissur District
- Time zone: UTC+5:30

Ollukara is a residential area in the City of Thrissur in Kerala state of India. Ollukkara is the Ward 15 of Thrissur Municipal Corporation. It is located close to Mannuthy. It is the first village in Kerala to attain legal literacy.

== See also ==
- Thrissur
- Thrissur District
- List of Thrissur Corporation wards
