= Indian Gandhiyan Party =

- Leader: Aashin US
- Headquarters: National Election Coordinator Mr. Aashin U S Kuriyakott Building, Thekkumpadam Road, Pattikkad; P.O., Thrissur District, Kerala 680509
- Newspaper: True India
- Youth wing: Indian Youth Movement
- Women's wing: Women India Movement
- Peasant's wing: Plant 100 Trees
- Membership: India Club
- Ideology: Republicanism; Nationalism; Gandhian
- International affiliation: World Safety Forum
- Colours: Blue
- ECI Status: Registered Unrecognized Parties
- Alliance: 193 countries consortium

Election symbol
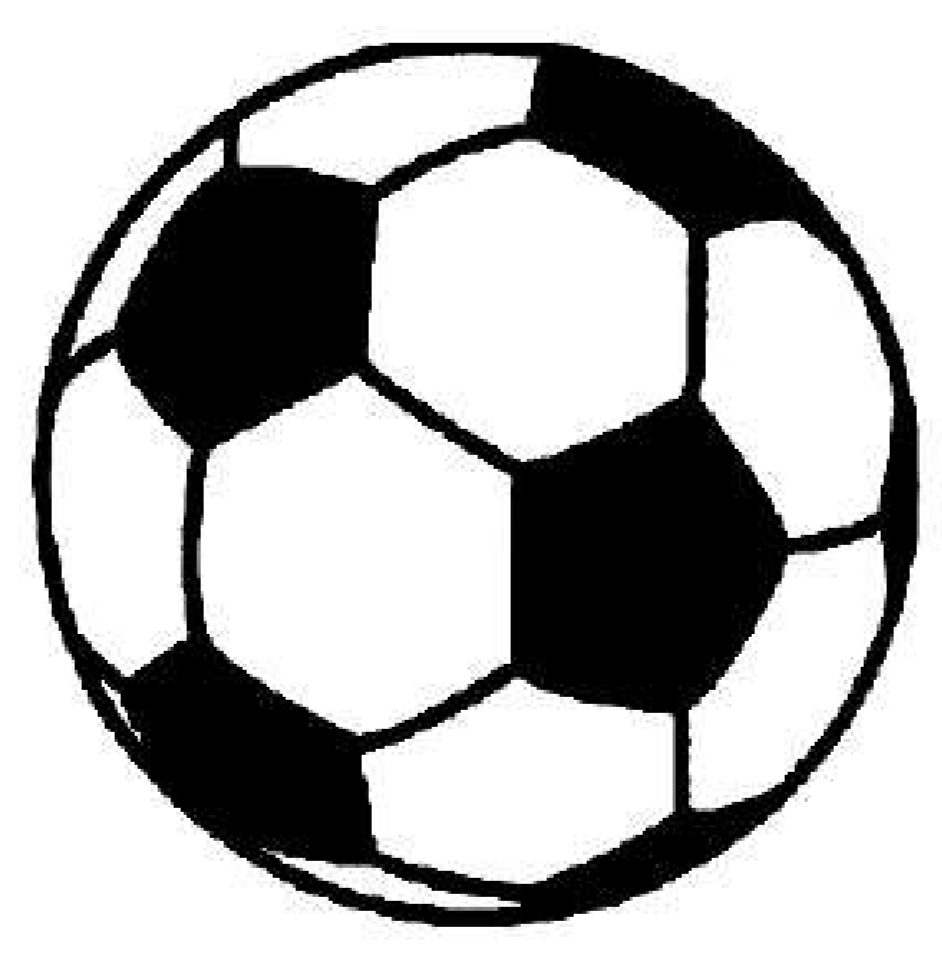

Website
- indiangandhiyanparty.com//

The Indian Gandhiyan Party (IGP) is a registered but unrecognized political party in the Indian state of Kerala. The party contested seats in the 2019 Indian general election. Aashin US, the National Election Coordinator of the IGP, contested Varanasi Lok Sabha Constituency against Narendra Modi in the 17th General Elections. Aashin received 504 votes with the campaign slogan "#IdevelopIndia". The party fielded candidates in 503 Lok Sabha constituencies. Aashin submitted a candidate application form in Amethi Constituency against Rahul Gandhi but the form was rejected. The IGP shortlists 543 business leaders for the 18th Lok Sabha General Election. As the first step towards it, Aashin contested the 17th general elections.

== Kerala Assembly Election ==
Legislative Assembly Term	Kerala Elections	Seats Contested	Seats won	% of Votes	% of votes in seats contested
14th Legislative Assembly 2016	2016	2	0	0.5	

== Lok Sabha (Lower House) ==
Lok Sabha Term	Indian General Election	Seats Contested	Seats won	Number Vote	% of Votes
16th Lok Sabha	2014	1	0	546	0.00%

== See also ==
- List of political parties in India
