= Aranattukara =

- Town
- Location in Kerala, India Aranattukara (India)
- Coordinates: 10.5135782°N 76.195367°E
- Country: India
- State: Kerala
- District: Thrissur

Languages
  - Official: Malayalam, English
- Time zone: UTC+5:30 (IST)
- Vehicle registration: KL-8

Aranattukara is a town situated in the city Thrissur, in Kerala, India. Aranattukara is the 51st ward of the Thrissur Municipal Corporation, an Indian civic body.

== Location ==
It is surrounded by the localities of Laloor, Ayyanthole, Poothole, Koorkenchery, and Vadookara. The town is 55 km from Kochi International Airport. Aranattukara is located just 2 km from Thrissur railway station and KSRTC State bus terminus.

== History ==
In the past, most of the transportation in Kerala was done by water transport. Aranattukara had a huge stockyard adjoining the backwaters for storing goods for the consumers of Thrissur.

Aranattukara is one of the early settlement areas of St. Thomas Christians by AD 800 who migrated from Kodungallur(Musiris). Some of them settled in Aranattukara and others moved to Angamali and Akapparampu for agriculture and businesses.

A church was built from the Statue of St Sebastian; which was found by the boatmen who were on the trip to Kochi for their supplies.

Aranattukara has a number of educational institutions in its locality, such as Calicut University Teacher Education Centre (M.Ed., B.Ed.) the School of Drama and Fine Arts is a theatre training institute, the School of Management Studies an MBA institution of Calicut University are located in Aranattukara under Dr John Matthai Centre in Laloor.

There is additionally Tharakan's High School, Infant Jesus Girls High School, and a Government School which provides necessary primary education in Aranattukara.

== Culture ==
The festival of Aranattukara church is held on the first Sunday of January

== See also ==
- Thrissur
- Thrissur District
