= Kuttumukku =

- City residential suburb
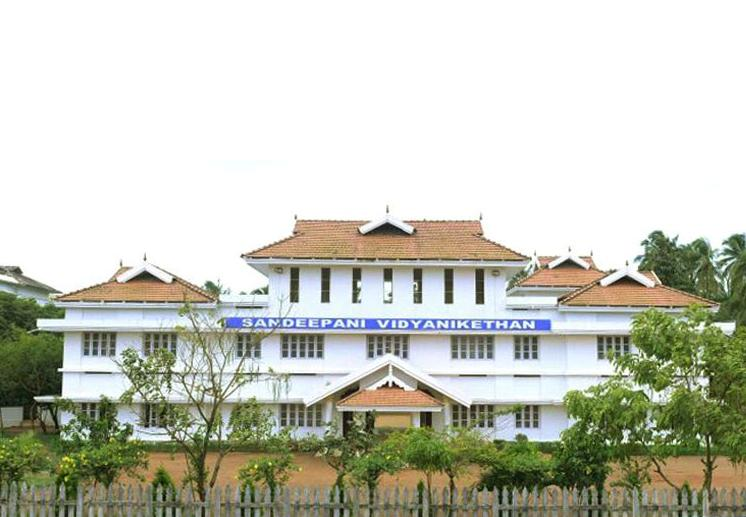
- Sandeepani Vidyanikethan

- Location in Kerala, India Kuttumukku (India)
- Coordinates: 10.548761°N 76.239989°E
- Country: India
- State: Kerala
- District: Thrisuur
- Area: Thrissur City

Government
  - Body: Thrissur Municipal Corporation
- Vehicle registration: KL
- Distance from Thrissur Railway Station: 7.5 kilometres (4.7 mi) N (Road)

Kuttumukku is a ward of Thrissur Municipal Corporation situated in the north-east side of the Corporation. It is a residential area with only a few institutions of importance.

== Some institutions located in Kuttumukku ==
- Vimala College, a first grade women's college under the CMC Management, affiliated to University of Calicut and established in 1967.
- Kuttumukku Siva temple, a temple dedicated to Shiva and worshipped as Kiratha Moorthy.
- Sandeepani Vidya Nikethan is a private school managed by the Thiruvambady Devaswom at Thrissur and started in the year 2002.

Kasthurbha smaraka vayanasala 50 year's of old library.

Kuttumukk Paddy Field..

Inside the Thrissur corporation we have only the largest paddy Field is situates in Kuttumukk.

== Cherumukk sreekrishna temple ==
- List of Thrissur Corporation wards
