= Ancheri =

Ancheri is a residential area situated in the City of Thrissur in Kerala state of India. Ancheri is Ward 25 of Thrissur Municipal Corporation.

== See also ==
- Thrissur
- Thrissur District
