= Kanimangalam =

- suburb
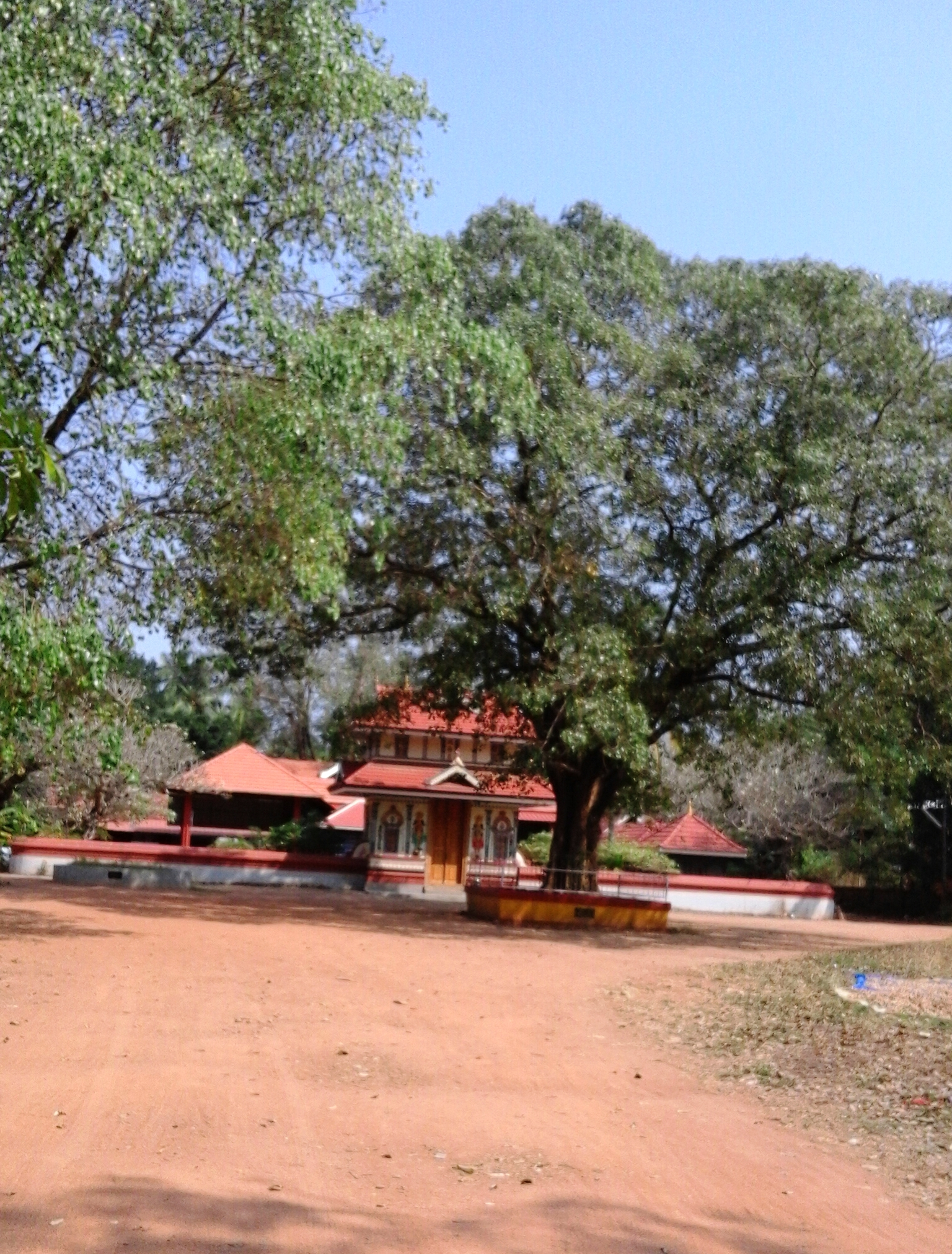
- Kanimangalam VAliyalukkal Temple
- Interactive map of Kanimangalam
- Coordinates: 10°29′0″N 76°12′0″E
- Country: India
- State: Kerala
- District: Thrissur

Government
  - Type: Corporation
  - Body: Thrissur Municipal corporation

Languages
  - Official: Malayalam, English
- Time zone: UTC+5:30 (IST)
- Postal code: 680027
- Vehicle registration: KL-08

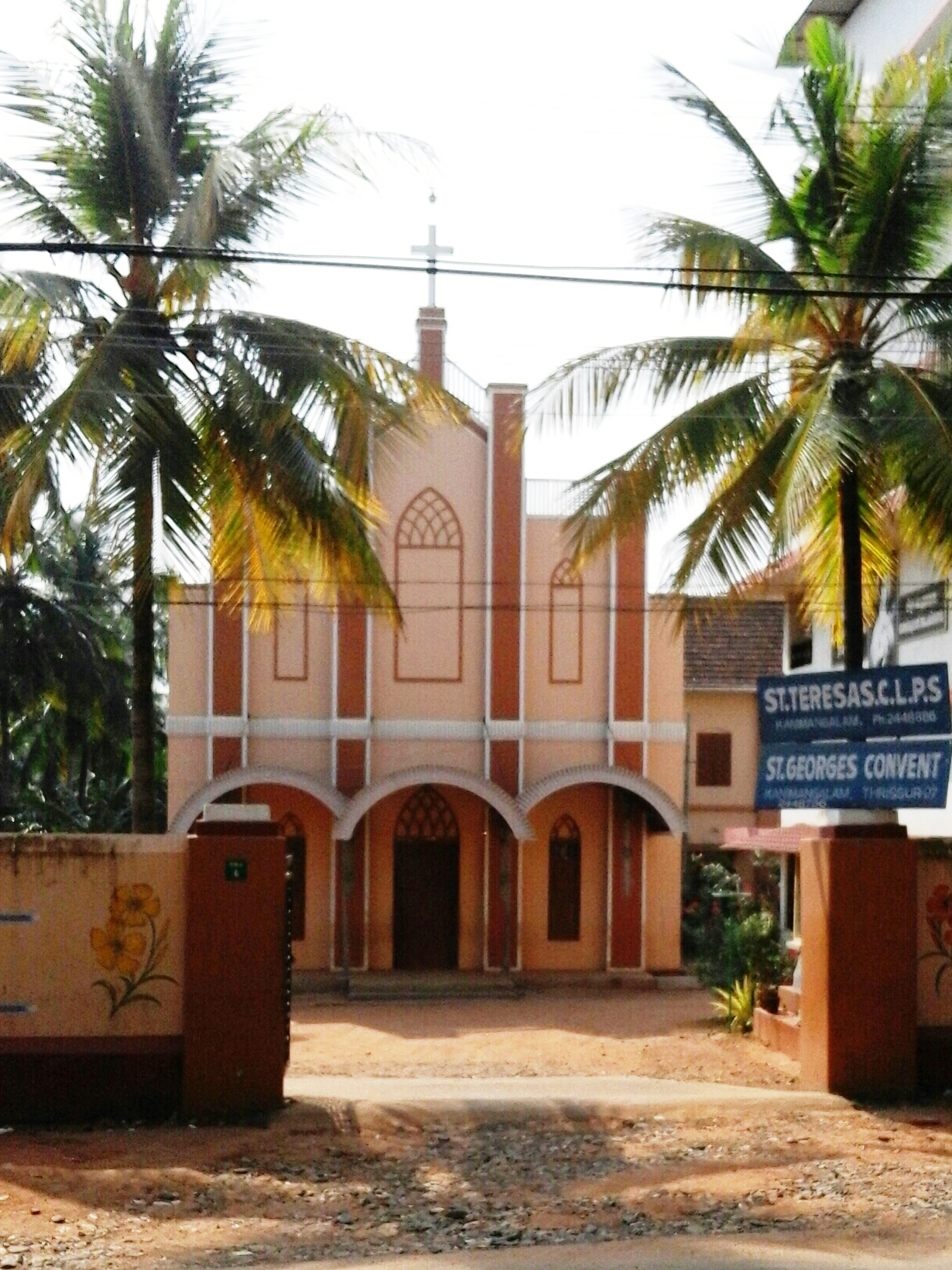
Kanimangalam St. Theresas Church

Kanimangalam is a suburb of Thrissur in the Thrissur district of the state of Kerala in south India. It is about 4 km away from Thrissur.

The main center of Kanimangalam is Valiyalukkal, where the Kanimangalam Sastha Temple is situated. It is on the route between Thrissur and Kodungallur .Kanimangalam Sastha Temple is the participant of the famous Thrissur Pooram. Kanimangalam Sastha is the first Pooram entering the Vadakkunnathan Temple and the protector of all goddesses who take part in Thrissur Pooram.

Kanimangalam is Ward 34 of Thrissur Municipal Corporation.

== Temples ==
Kanimangalam has a Sastha temple, which is about 0.5 km from Valiyalukkal Bhagavathy Temple. There is an associated festival. There is a Shiva temple near to this Sastha temple, which is about 100 m away.

== Worship Places ==
- Sri Valiyalukkal Bhagavathy Temple
- Kanimangalam Sastha Temple
- Kanimangalam Siva Temple
- Karamukku/Pookattikkara Temple
- Mullakkal Bhagavathy temple
- Vattappinni Bhagavathy temple
- St Therssa's Church
