= Rajan J. Pallan =

Indian politician

MLA of Thrissur Legislative Constituency
- Incumbent
- Assumed office 4 May 2026
- Preceded by: P. Balachandran

Mayor of Thrissur
- In office 15 January 2013 – 4 December 2015
- Preceded by: I.P. Paul
- Constituency: Ward No 11, Gandhinagar, Thrissur

Personal details
- Born: 2 October 1965 (age 60) Thrissur
- Party: Indian National Congress
- Spouse: Mariyama Rajan
- Children: Merin and Merlin

Rajan Jose Pallan (born 2 October 1965) is an Indian politician from Kerala. He is a Member of the Kerala Legislative Assembly from Thrissur Assembly constituency representing the Indian National Congress.

He was also the fifth mayor of Thrissur Municipal Corporation. and 16th MLA of Thrissur Legislative Constituency.
