= Kuttankulangara =

Kuttankulangara is a ward (Ward No. 2) of Thrissur Municipal Corporation situated in the north-west side of the corporation. It is a residential area with only a few institutions of importance. Kuttankulangara Sri Krishna Temple is located in this ward.

== See also ==
- List of Thrissur Corporation wards
