= St. Aloysius College, Thrissur =

College in Thrissur, Kerala

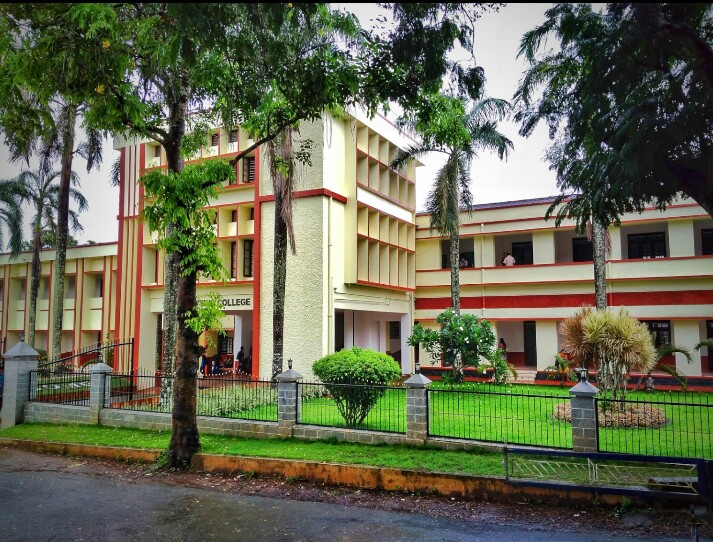
- Front side In Aloysius college
- Motto: Sursum Corda (Latin)
- Motto in English: Lift up your Hearts
- Type: Private Catholic Research Government Aided Non-profit Coeducational Higher education institution
- Established: 1968 (Kuriakose Elias Chavara)
- Founder: Kuriakose Elias Chavara (Carmelites of Mary Immaculate)
- Religious affiliation: Eastern Catholic (Carmelites of Mary Immaculate)
- Academic affiliations: University of Calicut
- Chairman: Rev.Fr.Walter Thelappilly, CMI
- Principal: Prof. Chacko Jose P
- Faculty: 100+
- Students: 2000+
- Undergraduates: 8
- Location: Elthuruth, Thrissur, Kerala, India; 10°49′59″N 76°18′09″E
- Campus: Suburban
- Language: English
- Nickname: SACT
- Website: www.staloysiuselt.edu.in

St. Aloysius College, Thrissur is government aided college situated in Elthuruth, Thrissur, Kerala. It is a first grade college affiliated to the University of Calicut. It is run by the congregation of Carmelites of Mary Immaculate (CMI). The college is administered by St. Mary's Monastery, a house under the Devamatha Province of the congregation. The college has Seven undergraduate courses (Physics, Mathematics, Chemistry, Zoology, Gemmology, Economics and Commerce) and five post-graduate courses (Economics, English, Chemistry, Zoology and Commerce).

== History ==
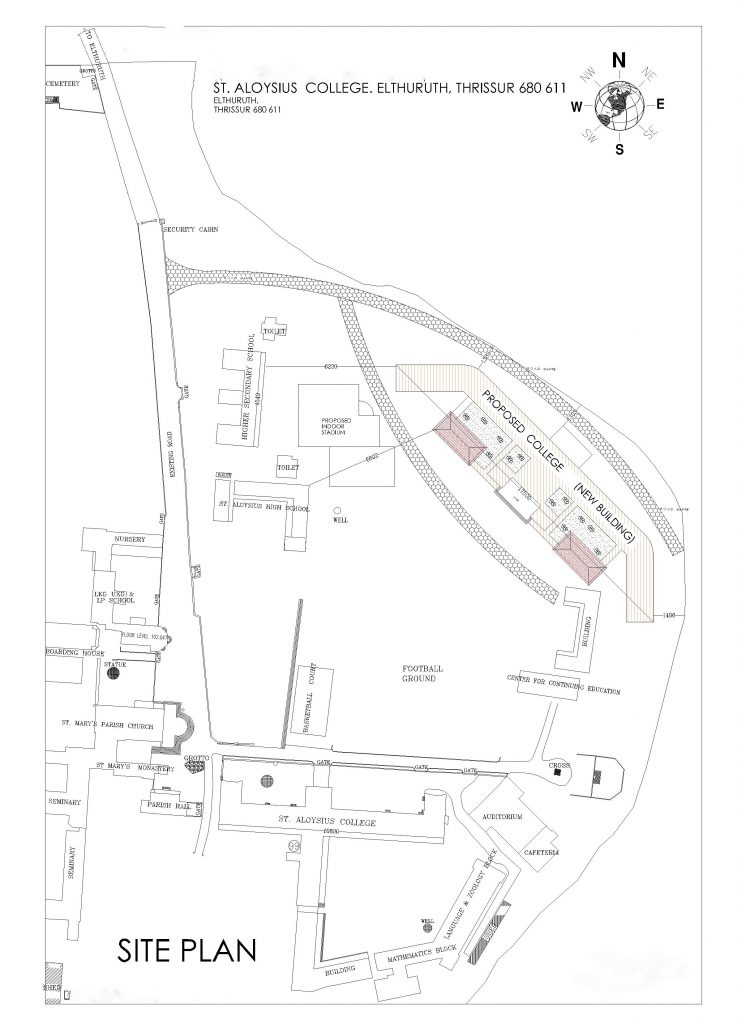
St. Aloysisu College Thrissur campus map

The college was sanctioned by the Government of Kerala by the order G.O. Ms 40/69/Edn dt. 21.1.69 and was given provisional affiliation to the Kerala University on 27 June 1968 and permanent affiliation was accorded to the college by the University of Calicut on 15 March 1971. In July 1978, the college was upgraded with B.A. Economics. The college obtained U.G.C. affiliation in April 1984. The college was accredited at the B+ level in 2004.

== Rankings ==
College rankings

General – India
- NIRF (Colleges) (2023): 80

The parent Calicut University was ranked 80th among Indian colleges by the NIRF in 2023

== Service Wing ==
- NCC
- NSS
- St. Chavara Centre for Teaching Excellence and Educational Innovation (SCCTEEI)
- Aloysian Centre for Kole Wetland Studies and Research (ACKWSR)
- Aloysian Centre for Life Long Learning

== Notable alumni ==
- Rajaji Mathew Thomas, Former Member of Kerala Legislative Assembly
- Jayaraj Warrier, Actor
- Dileep Menon, Malayalam Director
- Alphons Joseph, Music Composer
- Manoj George, Indian Violinist
- John P. Varkey Indian Guitarist
- Sreejith Ravi, Actor
