= Panamukku =

Panamukku is a residential area situated in the City of Thrissur in Kerala state of India. Panamukku is Ward 43 of Thrissur Municipal Corporation.

== See also ==
- Thrissur
- Thrissur District
