= Civil Station =

Area in India

Coordinates: 22°42′N 71°41′E

Civil Station is a residential area situated in the City of Thrissur in Kerala state of India. Civil Station is Ward 54 of Thrissur Municipal Corporation.

== See also ==
- Thrissur District
