= Kizhakkumpattukara =

Kizhakkumpattukara is a residential area situated in the City of Thrissur in Kerala state of India. Kizhakkumpattukara is Ward 13 of Thrissur Municipal Corporation. Kizhakkumpattukara is famous for its annual Kummatti Festival held during Onam celebrations. The famous Lourde Cathedral Thrissur is also situated in this area. Some other landmarks in the locality include the Bishop's Palace, St. Clare's School, Nirmalamatha School and Convent and Panammukkampali Ayyappa Temple.

== See also ==
- Thrissur
- Thrissur District
- List of Thrissur Corporation wards
