= Patavarad =

Padavarad is a residential area in the city of Thrissur in Kerala, India. Padavarad is Ward 26 of Thrissur Municipal Corporation.

Padavarad is a small but rapidly growing settlement. There are numerous home appliance and duty-paid shops, as well as more than 20 financial and kuri companies. Padavarad is a good residential area where all class of people can live. There are two churches and two temples, and many active welfare clubs such as Cheguvera Sporting, Kirans Club, Souhrda Club, etc. Politics of Padavarad vary, but the Communist Party of India (CPIM) is currently the major party; the division is also represented by a CPIM candidate, though the Congress Party is also active in Padavarad.

Varghese Kandamkulathy and former public prosecutor Adv. K D Babu are well-known residents.

Padavarad is attracting apartment and villa projects; GBT builders are a leading local developer.

== See also ==
- Thrissur
- Thrissur District
