= Mar Aphrem Church =

Church in Kottayam, India

Mar Aphrem Church, in Vadavathoor, Kottayam, India, is the first church in Kerala in the name of St. Ephrem of Syria. St. Mary and St. George are the other two saints of this church.
