= Valarkavu =

Area of Thrissur, India

Valarkavu is a residential area situated in the city of Thrissur in Kerala state of India. Valarkavu is Ward 24 of Thrissur Municipal Corporation.

== See also ==
- Thrissur
- Thrissur District
