= Pullazhi =

Pullazhi Pullazhy
- Village
- Location in Kerala, India Pullazhi (India)
- Coordinates: 10.5203°N 76.1699°E
- Country: India
- State: Kerala
- District: Thrissur

Languages
  - Official: Malayalam, English
- Time zone: UTC+5:30 (IST)
- PIN: 680012
- Telephone code: 0487
- Vehicle registration: KL-8
- Nearest city: Thrissur city
- Lok Sabha constituency: Thrissur
- Climate: Am/Aw (Köppen) (Köppen)

Pullazhi or Pullazhy, is a suburban area of Thrissur City in Kerala state, south India. It is almost 6 km away from Swaraj Round. Pullazhy is surrounded by paddy fields called "Kolpadavu", supervised and controlled by Pullazhi Kolpadavu Sahakarana Sangham. Many of the native families have an agrarian background. The village also contains a library called "Yuvajana Sangham Vayanasala".

An Accountant General's Quarters is situated in this village. The head office of the Thrissur Circle of the Archaeological Survey of India is inside the Green Valley KSHB colony. Kerala Lakshmi Mill in Pullazhy has a 42,944 spindle capacity, which produces carded polyester-cotton yarn. The mill is owned by the National Textile Corporation (NTC). Pullazhi is Ward 47 of Thrissur Municipal Corporation. The village has a Working Women's Hostel run by the Kerala State Housing Board.

== Landmarks ==
- Mannuthrikkovil Mahavishnu Temple
- St. Joseph's Church
- St. Joseph Mental Health Care Home
- Sree Maheswara Temple
- Ayyappa Temple, Kolpara
- Aikkattu Dharmasastha Temple
- Sree Muruga Temple, Vadakkumuri
- Kerala Lakshmi Mills
- St. Joseph Old Age Home
- St. Christina's Home
- Little Flower School
- Public Library (Yuvajana Sangham Vayanasala)
- AGs Quarters
- Office of the Superintending Archaeologist, Archaeological Survey of India, Thrissur Circle
- Pakal Veedu
- Working Women Hostel (KSHB)
- Navajyothi College of Teacher Education

== Places of worship ==
- Mannuthrukkovil Maha Vishnu Temple
- St. Joseph Church
- Sree Narayana Maheshwara Temple
- Sree Ayyappa Swami Temple
- St. Sebastian Chapel

== Corporation councillors ==
- Madathil Ramankutty (INC) 2000–2005
- P. V. Sarojini (INC) 2005–2010
- K. Ramanathan (INC) 2010–2015
- Rajani Viju (CPI(M)) 2015–2020
- K. Ramanathan (INC) 2020–2025
- Sunitha Vinu (INC) 2025 -

== See also ==
- Thrissur
- Thrissur District
