= Nedupuzha =

Nedupuzha is a residential area situated in the City of Thrissur in Kerala state of India. Nedupuzha is Ward 44 of Thrissur Municipal Corporation.

== See also ==
- Thrissur
- Thrissur District
