= Nadathara =

- Suburb
- Location in Kerala, India Nadathara (India)
- Coordinates: 10.510904°N 76.25903°E
- Country: India
- State: Kerala
- District: Thrissur

Government
  - Body: Thrissur Corporation / Nadathara Grama Panchayath

Population (2001)
  - Total: 12,593

Languages
  - Official: Malayalam, English
- Time zone: UTC+5:30 (IST)
- PIN: 680 751
- Vehicle registration: KL

Nadathara is a residential area in the city of Thrissur in Kerala state of India. Nadathara is Ward 22 of Thrissur Municipal Corporation. As of 2001 India census, Nadathara had a population of 12,593. Males constitute 49% of the population and females 51%. Nadathara has an average literacy rate of 84%, higher than the national average of 59.5%: male literacy is 86%, and female literacy is 82%.

AKMHS School, Poochatty is a higher secondary school in Poochatty, a suburban area of Nadathara.

== See also ==
- Thrissur
- Thrissur District
