= Kalathodu =

Coordinates: 10.5226°N 76.2468°E

Kalathodu is a residential area situated in the City of Thrissur in Kerala state of India. Kalathodu is Ward 20 of Thrissur Municipal Corporation.

== See also ==
- Thrissur
- Thrissur District
- List of Thrissur Corporation wards
