= Karyattukara =

Kariattukara is a residential area situated in the City of Thrissur in Kerala state of India. Kariattukara is Ward 45 of Thrissur Municipal Corporation.
