= Cherur =

Residential area in India

Coordinates: 12°30′N 75°02′E

Cheroor is a residential area situated in the City of Thrissur in the state of Kerala in India.

== See also ==
- Thrissur
- Thrissur District
- List of Thrissur Corporation wards
