= Chettupuzha =

Residential area in Thrissur, Kerala, India

Coordinates: 10°31′N 76°10′E

Chettupuzha is a residential area situated in the City of Thrissur in Kerala state of India. Chettupuzha is Ward 44 of Thrissur Municipal Corporation.

== See also ==
- Thrissur District
