= Elthuruth =

Area of Thrissur, India

Elthuruth is a residential area situated in the city of Thrissur in Kerala state of India. Elthuruth is Ward 45 of Thrissur Municipal Corporation. This is one of the most scenic suburbs of Thrissur corporation. The place is surrounded by paddy fields and canals forming a branch of kole wetlands. St. Aloysius School and College are the educational institutions serving this area.

== History ==
Elthuruth used to be part of Kariattukara until St. Chavara Kuriakose Elias established a CMI Catholic Monastery on a sub-island surrounded by paddy fields in 1858. It is believed that the German missionaries who visited the monastery named the island El-thuruth meaning 'God's island'('El'-God and 'Thuruth'- Island).

== Institutions ==
St. Aloysius College, Thrissur is situated in Elthuruth established in 1968 by congregation of Carmelites of Mary Immaculate (CMI). St. Aloysius HSS established in 1890 is one of the oldest functioning schools in Kerala.

== See also ==
- Thrissur
- Thrissur District
