= Nettissery =

Human settlement in India

Nettissery is a residential area situated in the City of Thrissur in Kerala state of India. The name "Nettissery" is believed to have originated from the local temple, which is associated with eight deities (Malayalam: Ettu Eswaranmar, meaning "Eight Lords"). According to local tradition, the name evolved from Ettu Eswarai to Nettissery over time. Nettissery is Ward 12 of Thrissur Municipal Corporation.Sintomol Sojan is the current Councillor, representing Indian National Congress (INC). The major festivals celebrated in Nettissery include Nettissery Pooram, held during the Malayalam month of Meenam as part of the Peruvanam–Arattupuzha Pooram festival; Deshakummatti, celebrated on the second day of Onam; and Ayyappan Vilakku, observed during the Malayalam month of Vrischikam.

== See also ==
- Thrissur
- Thrissur District
- List of Thrissur Corporation wards
