= Gandhinagar, Thrissur =

Gandhinagar, Thrissur is a residential area situated in the City of Thrissur in Kerala state of India. Gandhinagar is Ward 7 of Thrissur Municipal Corporation. It is one of the poshest residential area in the city of Thrissur.

== See also ==
- Thrissur
- Thrissur District
