= Kokkalai =

Kokkalai കോക്കല
- neighborhood
- Country: India
- State: Kerala
- District: Thrissur

Government
  - Body: Thrissur Municipal Corporation

Languages
  - Official: Malayalam, English
- Time zone: UTC+5:30 (IST)
- Vehicle registration: KL-08
- Nearest city: Thrissur
- Civic agency: Thrissur Municipal Corporation

Kokkalai is one of the business districts of Thrissur city in Kerala state, India. Thrissur railway station, one of the busiest and most important railway junctions in South India, connecting Thrissur city with the rest of Kerala and India, is situated here. It also houses Thrissur KSRTC Bus Station and a veterinary hospital run by Kerala Veterinary and Animal Sciences University. Hotel Sidhartha Regency and Hotel Casino are in the heart of Kokkalai. This is the southern part of the city.
