= Chiyyaram =

- Village
- Location in Kerala, India
- Coordinates: 10.4824300°N 76.210579°E
- Country: India
- State: Kerala
- District: Thrissur

Government
  - Body: Thrissur Municipal Corporation

Languages
  - Official: Malayalam, English
- Time zone: UTC+5:30 (IST)
- PIN: 680026
- Vehicle registration: KL- 08

Chiyyaram is a village that lies on the outskirts of Thrissur, Kerala, South India.

The Vijayamatha Church stands as a symbol of unity among the natives which enabled its planning, implementation, and construction. Chiyyaram is also known for Hindu temples such as Karamukku Temple. Other temples in Chiyyaram are Ollurkavu Bhagavathi temple, Mudipillavu Krishna temple, and Chiyyaram Dhanuvanthari temple. Hindus and Christians make up a large portion of Chiyyaram's population.

== See also ==
- Thrissur
- Thrissur District
