= Kanattukara =

- municipality
- Location in Kerala, India
- Coordinates: 10.527982°N 76.197803°E
- Country: India
- State: Kerala
- District: Thrissur

Languages
  - Official: Malayalam, English
- Time zone: UTC+5:30 (IST)
- Vehicle registration: KL-8

Kanattukara is a ward and residential area in Thrissur, Kerala, India. It is home to the Sankarankulangara Bhagavathy Temple.

There is an annual festival (Vela) celebrated in the temple. Pulikali, one of Onam’s main attractions, is celebrated every year in Kanattukara.

There is also a college, the Sree Kerala Varma College.
