= Poothole =

Suburb of India

Poothole is situated in Thrissur city of Kerala state of India. It is the 38th ward of Thrissur Municipal Corporation. A Food Craft Institute, run by Department of Tourism, Government of Kerala, is located at Poothole, Thrissur. Sree Rudhiramala Bhagavathi temple is also located in Poothole.
