= Olarikara =

Olarikkara Olari
- Suburb
- Location in Kerala, India Olarikkara (India)
- Coordinates: 10.52°N 76.17°E
- Country: India
- State: Kerala
- District: Thrissur

Languages
  - Official: Malayalam, English
- Time zone: UTC+5:30 (IST)
- PIN: 680012
- Telephone code: 487
- Vehicle registration: KL-8
- Nearest city: Thrissur city
- Lok Sabha constituency: Thrissur

Olarikkara, usually called Olari, is an important gateway to Thrissur city of Kerala state, South India. It is a major residential area in the city. It is 5 km away from Thrissur city. Several Hospitals, Temples and Churches are situated here. One of the E.S.I Hospitals of the city is here. Like all the places in Thrissur, it has very good bus facilities. Olari is Ward 46 of Thrissur Municipal Corporation.

== History ==
The village got its name from a root story about the Temple of Shree Bhagavathy. Hundreds of years ago there was a Sacred Brahmin's house where the temple is situated now. At the "Nadumuttom" of the house, it is believed that there was the presence of ‘Goddess Vanadurga’ and this Goddess was worshipped by the Brahmin with full faith. At that time the Brahmin was titled with surname "Ola" by the rulers. Hence the location of the temple was renowned as "Ola Irikkum Kara" which is later renowned as Olarikara.

== Important Amenities ==
- Federal bank
- South Indian Bank
- South Malabar Grammeen bank
- Bank of baroda
- Trichur urban co operative bank
- Govt Ayueveda dispensary
- Navajyothi B ED college
- Ayyanthole telephone exchange
- Ayyanthole K S E B
- Kerala lakshmi mill
- Trichur West A E O office
- Mother Hospital
- C.A.M Hospital
- E.S.I Hospital
- Thattil Supermarket
- Ilajithara charitable trust
- Karthika Super Market
- Margin free market
- Sheeba Theatre
- Bhavi Badhra Kuries
- Niya Regency 4 Star Hotel
- State Bank of India
- Dr Jawaharlal's Clinic
- Sagar Hotel
- Manappuram Finance Limited Olarikkara Branch

== Important Places to Worship ==
- Little Flower Church (a Church of Roman Catholic Syro malabar rite community and even has a High School in its name)
- Shree Bhagavathy Temple (also called 'Durga' Temple. The main deity here is Durga)
- Sri Parthasarathy Temple (main deity worshipped here is Lord Krishna)
- Sree Chathan Temple
- Mosque

== See also ==
- Thrissur
- Thrissur District
