= Mission Quarters =

Residential area in Thrissur, Kerala, India

Coordinates: 10°30′59.3″N 76°13′22.16″E

Mission Quarters is a residential area located in the heart of Thrissur city, Kerala, India. It is situated next to S.T Nagar, which is the main commercial centre of the city. Important institutions in the area include Jubilee Mission Medical College and Research Institute, Aquatics Club and Bethel Ashramam. It has 2123 male and 2620 female voters.

== See also ==
- Thrissur
- Thrissur District
