= Kannamkulangara =

Kannamkulangara Kannankulangara
- village
- Coordinates: 10.4824300°N 76.210579°E
- Vehicle registration: KL-08

Kannankulangara/Kannamkulangara is an area in the Southern part of Thrissur which is a part of OR intersected with Koorkenchery; in Kerala state, South India.

Kannankulangara is a commercial and residential area in Thrissur, Kerala, India. It is very closer to the city starting from Sakthan Thampuran. Bus stand and extending towards Chiyyaram and Koorkenchery Maheswara Temple. Kannankulangara is Ward 33 of Thrissur Municipal Corporation.

Kannankulangara is home to the Mahavishnu Temple, Sreekrishna Temple and Christ the King Church.

The name "Kannankulangara " has meaning, which can interpreted as "Land near to Kannan's Pond". There is also a Pond near to the Mahavishnu Temple temple. So its said that the name "Kannan" + "Kulam" + "Kara" = Kannankulangara. There is an annual festival celebrated in the temple.

Hindus and Christians are dominant in this place which has now become a prime residential area.

Sun Medical And Research Centre, Trichur Head Post Office, Income Tax/Customs offices are located in Kannankulangara, Thrissur.

== See also ==
- Thrissur
