= Laloor =

- neighborhood
- Location in Kerala, India Laloor (India)
- Coordinates: 10.5135782°N 76.195367°E
- Country: India
- State: Kerala
- District: Thrissur

Languages
  - Official: Malayalam, English
- Time zone: UTC+5:30 (IST)
- Vehicle registration: KL-
- Nearest city: Ayyanthole
- Lok Sabha constituency: Thrissur

Laloor is a residential area situated in the city of Thrissur in Kerala, India. It is Ward 50 of Thrissur Municipal Corporation as of 2020.

== Places of Interest ==
- Laloor Bhagavathy Temple
- Dr. John Matthai Centre(School of Drama)
- IM Vijayan Indoor Stadium
- Holy Trinity Ashram
- St. Aloysius College, Thrissur
- Laloor-sree-subramanya-temple
- Sree-Narayana-Guru-Samajam

== See also ==
- Laloorinu Parayanullathu
- Thrissur
- Thrissur District
