= Chris Sherwin =

English veterinary scientist (1962–2017)

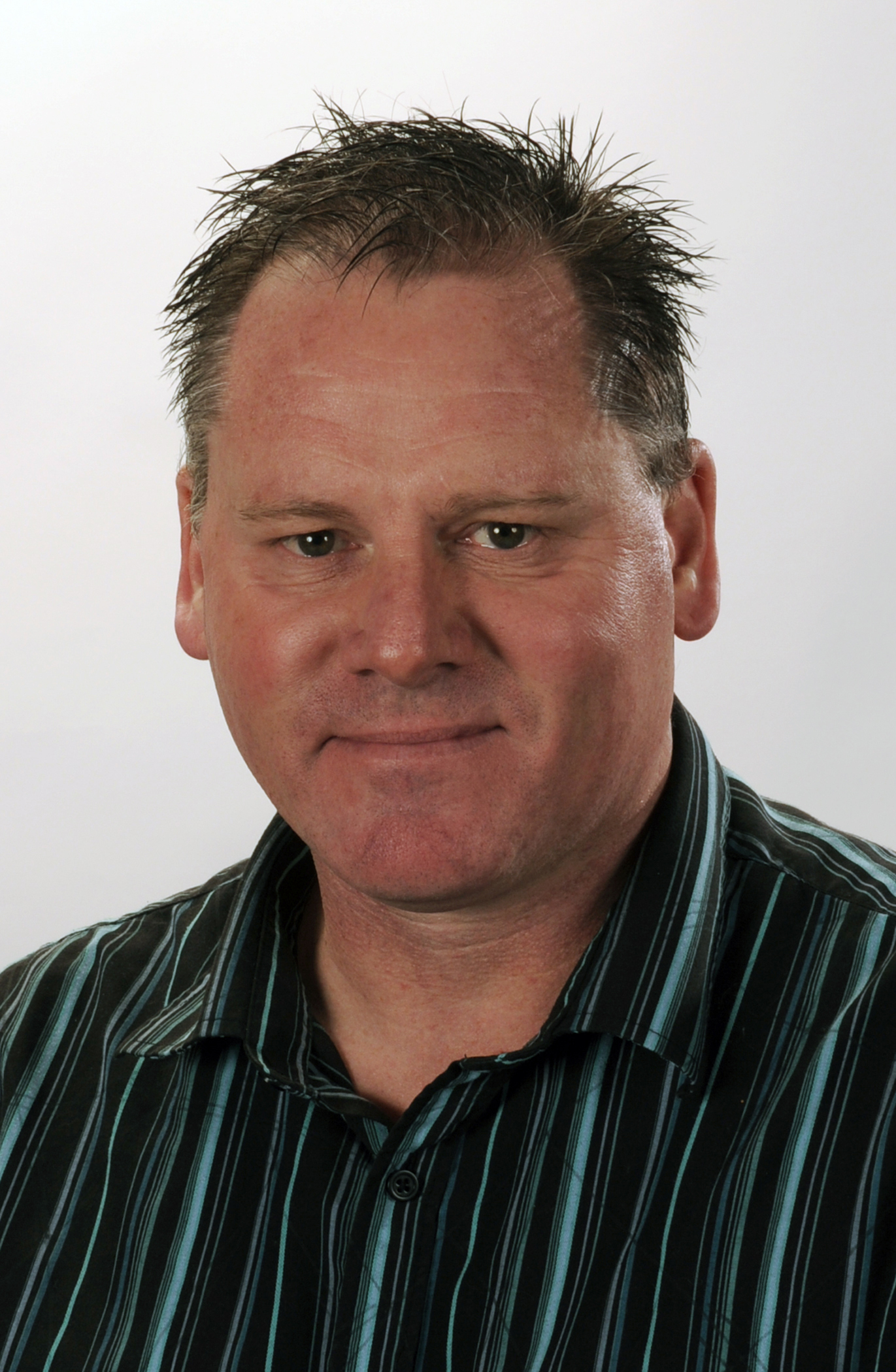
- Sherwin in 2009
- Born: Christopher M. Sherwin; 1 December 1962; Bradford, England
- Died: 18 July 2017 (aged 54)
- Education: Murdoch University
- Known for: Animal behaviour and welfare
- Awards: Hume Fellowship (2001)
- Scientific career
- Fields: Veterinary science; Animal welfare science; Ethology
- Workplaces: University of Bristol Veterinary School
- Doctoral advisor: Ken Johnson

Christopher M. Sherwin (1 December 1962 – 18 July 2017) was an English veterinary scientist and senior research fellow at the University of Bristol Veterinary School in Lower Langford, Somerset. He specialised in applied ethology, the study of the behaviour of animals in the context of their interactions with humans, and of how to balance the animals' needs with the demands placed on them by humans.

Sherwin became known for his work on the welfare of animals in zoos, farms and laboratories, and in particular for his research into the behaviour of laboratory mice. He created and chaired the Animal Ethics Committee of the International Society for Applied Ethology, and in 2003 was the lead author of its ethical guidelines. He also served as secretary of the Ethical Committee of the Association for the Study of Animal Behaviour. A colleague at Bristol described Sherwin as a "stalwart advocate for animals and their welfare". In 2019 the RSPCA posthumously awarded Sherwin a Special Recognition Award: according to the Head of the RSPCA's Research Animals Department, "Chris Sherwin’s work influenced and assisted all of the RSPCA science departments, which deal with wildlife, research, companion and farmed animals".

== Early life and education ==
Sherwin was born in Bradford, England, and spent several years in Australia, where he earned his BSc in veterinary biology from Murdoch University in Perth. In 1987 he obtained his PhD, also from Murdoch University, for a thesis entitled Shading behaviour in sheep: The influence of social and thermal factors.

== Career ==
=== Research overview ===
Sherwin became a junior research fellow at the University of New England in Armidale, New South Wales, where he wrote about electronic tags and ear damage in pigs before returning to England in 1990. That year he joined the Animal Welfare and Behaviour group at the University of Bristol Veterinary School to work on enriched housing for laying hens. Sherwin worked at Bristol until he retired in 2012. During his two decades there, he became known for his research into improving the housing and husbandry of captive animals, and for his work on developing ethical guidelines for animal use. He studied poultry in commercial facilities, mice in laboratories, elephants in zoos, insect consciousness, and the use of video to record farm animals' behaviour.

=== Poultry and laboratory birds ===
Sherwin's studies included examining the behaviour of birds on farms and in laboratories. He wrote about housing for poultry used in meat and egg production. Between 1998 and 2001 he published 11 papers on turkeys, which included examining the effect of lighting on their welfare; his research suggested that turkeys prefer brighter lights than those in commercial facilities. In the early 2000s, he was a member of the European Council's Working Group for Birds, which wrote provisions for birds for the European Convention for the Protection of Vertebrate Animals used for Experimental and Other Scientific Purposes. In a study for the RSPCA's "Freedom Food" label in 2009, he led a team from Bristol University that investigated stocking densities of hens used for eggs. In 2010, Sherwin found a high incidence of broken bones in hens housed in a type of cage that was banned in the European Union soon afterwards.

=== Elephants in zoos ===
From 2005 to 2007 Sherwin was part of a team funded by the Department for Environment, Food and Rural Affairs (Defra), the RSPCA, BIAZA, and IFAW to write a report concerning captive elephants: The Welfare, Housing and Husbandry of Elephants in UK Zoos (2008), about the 77 elephants then kept in 13 British zoos. Sherwin told the BBC that almost half the elephants engaged in behaviour not seen in the wild, such as pacing, retracing their steps, and repeatedly swaying their trunks, which "almost certainly indicates they're in an environment which is inappropriate for their needs". According to the report, 38 percent of the elephants the team examined performed these stereotypies for over one percent of the time during the day, and nearly half did so at night; during one 24-hour period, one elephant stereotyped over 60 percent of the time. In Sherwin's view, elephants could be kept in zoos with the correct housing and care, but not in the numbers seen at that time.

=== Invertebrate pain ===
Another of Sherwin's research interests was the complexity of invertebrate behaviour and their capacity to suffer pain. He told Discovery News in 2009 that whether invertebrates experience pain was "fundamental" to the laws that protect animals and regulate their use. Mike Mendl, a colleague of Sherwin's, wrote that Sherwin anticipated the interest in insect emotion and consciousness by over a decade. According to Jonathan Balcombe, Sherwin challenged the traditional view of the insect as a "spineless, pre-programmed automaton".

Sherwin reasoned that insects had preferences, habits, and memories, and could experience suffering as a "negative mental state". That insects have different nervous systems and might perceive pain differently from vertebrates does not mean they lack consciousness. When deciding whether an animal can suffer, he wrote in 2001, we compare its responses to those of evolutionarily higher animals, an argument by analogy, and find that invertebrates "often behave in a strikingly analogous manner to vertebrates". (Note: Sherwin (Animal Welfare, 1 February 2001): "Suffering is a negative mental state—a private experience—and, as such, it cannot be measured directly. When assessing the capacity of an animal to experience suffering, we often compare the similarity of its responses with those of 'higher' animals, conceptualized in the principle of argument-by-analogy. By closely examining the responses of invertebrates, it can be seen that they often behave in a strikingly analogous manner to vertebrates. In this paper, I discuss published studies that show that invertebrates such as cockroaches, flies and slugs have short- and long-term memory; have age effects on memory; have complex spatial, associative and social learning; perform appropriately in preference tests and consumer demand studies; exhibit behavioural and physiological responses indicative of pain; and, apparently, experience learned helplessness. The similarity of these responses to those of vertebrates may indicate a level of consciousness or suffering that is not normally attributed to invertebrates.") He told a conference in 2000:

If a chimp pulls its hand away after an electric shock, we say she presumably must have felt an analogous subjective experience to what we call pain. But cockroaches, slugs and snails—which are not protected by legislation—also reacted in the same way, while tests on flies showed they could associate a smell with receiving an electric shock. If it is a chimp we say it feels pain, if a fly we don't. Why?

=== Laboratory mice ===
Sherwin's most influential research was on the behaviour and welfare of laboratory mice. In one highly cited study, published in 1998, he built a device that allowed five mice to leave their cages—by pressing levers to open the door—for a loop that they could run around, a series of tunnels, or a wheel. Over time, they had to press the lever more often, up to 80 times, to gain access. Of the three options, the loop was the least preferred, and the wheel was "least affected by increasing the cost of access". As a result of that research, Sherwin was awarded a Universities Federation for Animal Welfare (UFAW) Hume Research Fellowship in 2001.

He went on to conduct extensive studies on laboratory cage design, showing that mice kept in ordinary cages chose to drink more of an anxiety-reducing drug than mice housed in larger cages with nesting material, a nest box, and a running wheel, where they could burrow and be with other mice. He trained mice to open a lever to access cages with more space, varying how often the lever had to be pressed, and found that more space was something they were willing to work for. He found that cage colour affected mouse welfare, including body weight; the mice liked white cages most and red least. In another study, he demonstrated that mice need to engage in burrowing behaviour. Laboratory mice spent the same amount of time burrowing whether or not they were supplied with ready-made burrows. Sherwin used burrows constructed by the same mouse in an earlier part of the experiment, thereby addressing the argument that the mouse continued to burrow only because the ready-made burrows were inadequate.

=== Housing and husbandry ===
Sherwin wrote in 2004 that the behaviour and health of laboratory animals given standard housing and care are frequently abnormal, which may reduce the value of the data obtained from them. The RSPCA quoted from his paper in a brochure discussing corporate social responsibility and "the 3Rs". In 2007 he argued, in a letter to Nature, that it was good science to include details about the handling and housing of laboratory animals in published papers, because factors such as cage size and flooring can influence metabolism, temperature, blood pressure and feeding behaviour. (Note: Sherwin (Nature, 19 July 2007): "Cage size can influence metabolism, baseline rectal temperature, the fever response, feeding behaviour and behavioural responses in predator–prey interactions. The type of flooring in a cage can affect blood pressure, heart rate and body temperature. Other factors that influence physiology and behaviour include housing laboratory mice as singletons or pairs, the complexity of the cage and the extent to which animals are handled.")

=== Other work ===
From 1998 to 2001 Sherwin sat on the Council of the International Society for Applied Ethology (ISAE). He later chaired the ISAE's Animal Ethics Committee, and was the lead author in 2003 of its ethical guidelines. In 2006 he was the lead organizer of the 40th International Congress of the ISAE at Bristol. He also served as secretary of the Ethical Committee of the Association for the Study of Animal Behaviour, and sat on the editorial board of the journal Animal Sentience. He was a member of the Joint Working Group on Refinement (JWGR), set up by the British Veterinary Association's Animal Welfare Foundation, FRAME, the RSPCA and UFAW, which produced a report on laboratory birds in 2001.

In 2005 he sat on the European Food Safety Authority's (EFSA) working group on laboratory animals. Sherwin's team, led by Donald Broom, addressed the protection of invertebrates and animal fetuses. The assessment was adopted by the EFSA's Panel on Animal Health and Welfare in November 2005, which decided that animal fetuses should be given anaesthesia and analgesia for procedures that would cause pain in the newborn of the same species.

After his retirement, Sherwin became an editor on Wikipedia, where he wrote nearly fifty articles.

== Selected works ==
Sherwin published over 62 works, including:

- Sherwin, C. M.; Nicol, C. J. (May 1996). "Reorganization of behaviour in laboratory mice, Mus musculus, with varying cost of access to resources". Animal Behaviour. 51 (5): 1087–1093. doi:10.1006/anbe.1996.0110. S2CID 53175784.
- Sherwin, CM; Nicol, CJ (January 1997). "Behavioural Demand Functions of Caged Laboratory Mice for Additional Space". Animal Behaviour. 53 (1): 67–74. doi:10.1006/anbe.1996.0278. S2CID 53175594.
- Sherwin, CM (July 1998). "Voluntary wheel running: a review and novel interpretation". Animal Behaviour. 56 (1): 11–27. doi:10.1006/anbe.1998.0836. PMID 9710457. S2CID 20831697.
- Sherwin, Chris M. (2002). "Comfortable quarters for mice in research institutions". In V. Reinhardt & A. Reinhardt (eds.). Comfortable Quarters for Laboratory Animals, 9th edition. Washington, DC: Animal Welfare Institute, pp. 6–7. ISBN 978-0-9384-1402-5
- Sherwin, C. M. (2005). "Turkeys: Behaviour, Management and Well-Being", in Wilson G. Pond and Alan W. Bell (eds.). Encyclopedia of Animal Science. New York: Marcel Dekker, pp. 847–852. ISBN 0-8247-5496-4
- Sherwin, CM; Richards, GJ; Nicol, CJ (September 2010). "Comparison of the welfare of layer hens in 4 housing systems in the UK". British Poultry Science. 51 (4): 488–499. doi:10.1080/00071668.2010.502518. PMID 20924842. S2CID 8968010.
- Sherwin, Chris (2010). "The Husbandry and Welfare of Non-Traditional Laboratory Rodents", in R. Hubrecht and J. Kirkwood (eds.). The UFAW Handbook on the Care and Management of Laboratory and Other Research Animals, 8th edition. Oxford: Wiley-Blackwell, pp. 359–369. ISBN 9781405175234 doi:10.1002/9781444318777.ch25
