= Jeremy Marchant =

British-American ethologist (born 1966)

Jeremy Marchant FRSB CF
- Born: Jeremy Neville Marchant; 6 January 1966 (age 60); R.A.F. Akrotiri, Cyprus
- Education: University of Cambridge University of Bristol
- Known for: Animal welfare science
- Scientific career
- Fields: Ethology; Animal welfare
- Workplaces: U.S. Department of Agriculture
- Thesis: The Effects of Dry Sow Housing Conditions on Welfare at Farrowing (1994)

Jeremy Neville Marchant FRSB CF (formerly Marchant Forde; born 6 January 1966, R.A.F. Akrotiri, Cyprus) is an English/American biologist currently working as Science + Research Director for A World of Good Initiative Inc. He is a former chief scientist for Organic Plus Trust, with responsibility for Global Animal Partnership standards and a former research animal scientist at the United States Department of Agriculture – Agricultural Research Service's Livestock Behavior Research Unit, based in West Lafayette, Indiana. He is also a past president and Honorary Fellow of the International Society for Applied Ethology.

== Biography ==
Jeremy Marchant attended Woodbridge School and subsequently the University of Bristol and St. Catharine's College, Cambridge. He received his BSc degree in biochemistry and Ph.D. degree in applied animal behaviour from Cambridge University, supervised by Donald Broom. During his time as a graduate student, he was a keen sportsman, representing Cambridge in the 1992 and 1993 Rugby League Varsity Matches, winning 2 Half Blues and being elected to the Hawks' Club. In 1996 he received a Churchill Fellowship which enabled him to spend 3 months visiting research centers throughout Northern Europe, collating research on alternatives to the farrowing crate, and influencing his work on causes of piglet mortality.

Previous academic positions include research associate at the University of Cambridge and senior research fellow at the University of Lincoln. Previous academic roles include honorary treasurer of the International Society for Applied Ethology and member of program committees for the American Society of Animal Science and British Society of Animal Science. He was chair of the organizing committee for the 45th Congress of the International Society for Applied Ethology held in Indianapolis in 2011. He has served on the editorial board for the Journal of Animal Science and as a section editor for Livestock Science. He was an inaugural specialty chief editor for Frontiers in Veterinary Science, with responsibility for the Animal Behavior & Welfare specialty section.

His early work on the effects of housing systems on the welfare of pregnant sows, specifically on cardiovascular health, bone strength and posture-changing behavior, contributed to the body of evidence that led, eventually, to major changes in animal welfare and the way these animals are kept in many parts of the world, beginning with the European Union and spreading to North America and Oceania. He was also the first animal welfare scientist to publish a study using heart rate variability as a welfare indicator.

== Awards ==
- 1996: Travelling Fellowship: Winston Churchill Memorial Trusts
- 1999: Distinguished Junior Scholar: Peter Wall Institute for Advanced Studies, University of British Columbia.
- 2002–2016: 14 Certificates of Merit: US Department of Agriculture
- 2023: Honorary Fellow: International Society for Applied Ethology

== Selected works ==
Jeremy Marchant has over 250 refereed scientific articles and abstracts, attracting over 8000 citations. His h-index is 45.

- The Welfare of Pigs (2009)
- The Encyclopedia of Applied Animal Behaviour and Welfare, with Daniel S. Mills, Paul McGreevy, David Morton, Christine Nicol, Clive Phillips, Peter Sandoe and Ronald Swaisgood (2010)
- Proceedings of the 45th Congress of the International Society for Applied Ethology, with Edmond Pajor (2011)
