= Alistair Lawrence =

Scottish ethologist

- Awards: RSPCA/BSAS award (1995).
- Scientific career
- Fields: Ethology

Alistair B. Lawrence (born 1954) is an ethologist. He currently holds a joint chair in animal behaviour and welfare at Scotland's Rural College and the University of Edinburgh.

== Education ==
Lawrence graduated from the University of St Andrews with a degree in zoology. He then studied for his PhD at the University of Edinburgh under the direction of David Wood-Gush. His 1985 thesis is entitled “The social organization of Scottish blackface sheep".

== Career ==
In 1995 he received the RSPCA/BSAS award for innovative developments in animal welfare for his 'outstanding contribution to animal welfare research'.

He has published extensively throughout his career.

Lawrence is a past secretary of the International Society for Applied Ethology and is a supporter of Compassion in World Farming. He has served on the UK Farm Animal Welfare Committee and has been appointed to the council of the Universities Federation for Animal Welfare.

With Aubrey Manning he oversees the David Wood-Gush Trust Fund that set up and supports the annual Wood-Gush lecture.
