= Animal welfare science =

Study of the welfare of animals

Animal welfare science is the scientific study of the welfare of animals as pets, in zoos, laboratories, on farms and in the wild. Although animal welfare has been of great concern for many thousands of years in religion and culture, the investigation of animal welfare using rigorous scientific methods is a relatively recent development. The world's first Professor of Animal Welfare Science, Donald Broom, was appointed by Cambridge University (UK) in 1986.

== Historical legislation and guidelines ==
Early legislation which formed the impetus for assessing animal welfare and the subsequent development of animal welfare science include the Ireland Parliament (Thomas Wentworth) "An Act against Plowing by the Tayle, and pulling the Wooll off living Sheep", 1635, and the Massachusetts Colony (Nathaniel Ward) "Off the Bruite Creatures" Liberty 92 and 93 in the "Massachusetts Body of Liberties" of 1641.

Richard Martin's act, the "Cruel Treatment of Cattle Act 1822" is often considered to be the precursor of modern relevant legislation. One of the first national laws to protect animals was the UK "Cruelty to Animals Act 1835" followed by the "Protection of Animals Act 1911". In the US it was many years until there was a National law to protect animals—the "Animal Welfare Act of 1966"—although there were a number of states that passed anti-cruelty laws between 1828 and 1898. In India, animals are protected by the "Prevention of Cruelty to Animals Act, 1960". In the UK, the "Animal Welfare Act 2006" consolidated many different forms of animal welfare legislation.

Animal welfare science can be considered as the assessment of welfare. The first publication to include the term "assessment" appears to be a 1965 appendix by William Homan Thorpe entitled The assessment of pain and distress in animals. This was followed 20 years later by a highly influential paper on assessing pain and distress in laboratory animals by Morton and Griffiths.

== Methods of assessment ==
Animal welfare science uses a variety of behavioural or physiological measures or indicators. Integrated approaches to assess animal welfare include risk analysis and semantic modelling of animal welfare.

=== Animal behaviour ===
- Occurrence of abnormal behaviours (e.g. stereotypies, feather pecking, tail-biting, facial expressions)
- Departure from ethogram of ancestral precursors
- Intra-specific variations in behavioural welfare indices
- Behaviour of captive animals upon release in a natural environment
- Preference studies
- Motivation studies
- Cognitive bias in animals studies
- Self selection of anxiolytics
- Effects of frustration

=== Animal physiology ===
- Heart rate
- Heart rate variability
- Corticosteroids in plasma, saliva, urine, faeces, hair, feathers and eggs
- Immune function
- Neurobiology
- Eggshell quality
- Thermography including eye surface temperature

== Organisations ==
Organisations interested in animal welfare science were set up before the subject became recognised as a science. The Royal Society for the Prevention of Cruelty to Animals (RSPCA) was founded in 1824 by a group of twenty-two reformers led by Richard Martin MP (who would thereby earn the nickname Humanity Dick), William Wilberforce MP and the Reverend Arthur Broome. The Universities Federation for Animal Welfare (UFAW) history can be traced to the founding in 1926 of the University of London Animal Welfare Society (ULAWS) by Major Charles Hume. The name was changed to the Universities Federation for Animal Welfare in 1938, reflecting the increasingly wide range of people and institutions involved.

More recent organisations involved in animal welfare science include the Scientists Center for Animal Welfare (SCAW) and university departments specialising in this branch of science including the Animal Welfare and Anthrozoology Center at Cambridge University, the Animal Welfare Science Centre at The University of Melbourne in Australia and the Animal Welfare Science and Bioethics Centre at Massey University in New Zealand.

Although not limited to animal welfare science, many members of the International Society for Applied Ethology work and publish research in this subject.

== Journals, articles and books ==
Veterinary journals carrying articles on animal welfare have been published for many years, for example, the Veterinary Record has been published weekly since 1888. Peer-reviewed scientific journals have been launched more recently, e.g. Applied Animal Behaviour Science in 1974, Animal Welfare in 1992, the Journal of Applied Animal Welfare Science in 1998, and Frontiers in Veterinary Science—Animal Behavior and Welfare in 2014.

Many books on animal welfare science have been written, for example those by Professor Marian Stamp Dawkins, Professor David Fraser, Michael Appleby, Barry Hughes and Joy Mench, John Webster, and David Mellor et al.

== Teaching ==
In 2011 in an article on the history of animal welfare science, Donald Broom wrote "The numbers of animal welfare scientists is increasing rapidly. The subject is now being taught in all European countries and the number of university courses on animal welfare in Brazil has increased from one to over 60 in 15 years. The diversity of animal welfare science is increasing and the expansion is likely to continue. The decision by the American Veterinary Medical Association to promote the teaching of the subject in all American veterinary schools will have a substantial effect."

== See also ==
- Animal welfare
- Animal consciousness
- Fish welfare at slaughter
- Pain in amphibians
- Pain in animals
- Pain in crustaceans
- Pain in fish
- Pain in invertebrates
- Welfare biology
- Wild animal suffering

== Further references ==
- Broom, D.M. (1991). "Animal welfare: concepts and measurement". Journal of Animal Science. 69 (10): 4167–75. doi:10.2527/1991.69104167x. PMID 1778832.
- Huntingford FA, Adams C, Braithwaite VA, Kadri S, Pottinger TG, Sandøe P, Turnbull JF (2006). "Review paper: Current issues in fish welfare" (PDF). Journal of Fish Biology. 68 (2): 332–372. doi:10.1111/j.0022-1112.2006.001046.x. S2CID 84511123.
- Kirkwood James K (2013). "Wild animal welfare". Animal Welfare. 22: 147–48. doi:10.7120/09627286.22.1.147.
