= Lisa Collins (agronomist) =

British agronomist

Lisa Collins FLSW FRSB FRSS
- Occupation: Agronomist
- Awards: Fellow of the Learned Society of Wales (2020)

Academic background
- Education: University of Oxford (MA and DPhil)
- Thesis: Non-intrusive social preference assessment in broiler chickens (2006)
- Doctoral advisor: Marian Dawkins

Academic work
- Discipline: Agronomy
- Sub-discipline: Pig farming
- Institutions: Queen's University, Belfast; University of Leeds; University of Surrey

Lisa M. Collins FLSW FRSB FRSS is a British veterinary scientist and agronomist who specializes in pig farming. She has worked at Queen's University, Belfast, the University of Leeds, and the University of Surrey.

== Biography ==
Lisa Collins studied at the University of Oxford, where she obtained a Master of Arts degree in biological sciences. She subsequently obtained a DPhil in zoology, with her Oxford doctoral research centering on the welfare of broiler stocking densities. Her doctoral dissertation Non-intrusive social preference assessment in broiler chickens was supervised by Marian Dawkins. She was a research fellow at the Royal Veterinary College.

Collins worked at Queen's University, Belfast, where she was a lecturer in animal behaviour. She later moved to the University of Leeds, where she served as Professor of Animal Science and Pro-Dean for Research & Innovation. In 2023, she moved to University of Surrey to become Pro Vice Chancellor of Research and Innovation.

Collins researches technological agronomy and animal welfare, specifically pig farming. She researched smart agriculture during her time at Leeds, serving as principal investigator for the Global Food Security-funded PIGSustain project. She headed the Leeds' Smart Agri-Systems project to research sustainable smart agriculture to help pig farming navigate the future. She was president of the British Science Association Agriculture and Food Section in 2022. She was also Academic Director of the National Pig Centre and Director of Commercial Research for the Global Food and Environment Institute.

She was one of three co-winners of the 2011 Universities Federation for Animal Welfare Young Animal Welfare Scientist of the Year. She won the 2014 British Science Association Charles Darwin Award. She was appointed Fellow of the Learned Society of Wales in 2020. She is also a Fellow of the Royal Society of Biology and Fellow of the Royal Statistical Society.
