= Michael Appleby =

Michael Appleby may refer to:

- Michael C. Appleby, animal welfare specialist
- Michael Appleby (politician), New Zealand politician
- Michael Appleby (rugby league), Australian rugby league player
