= Marian Dawkins =

British biologist (born 1945)

Marian Dawkins CBE FRS
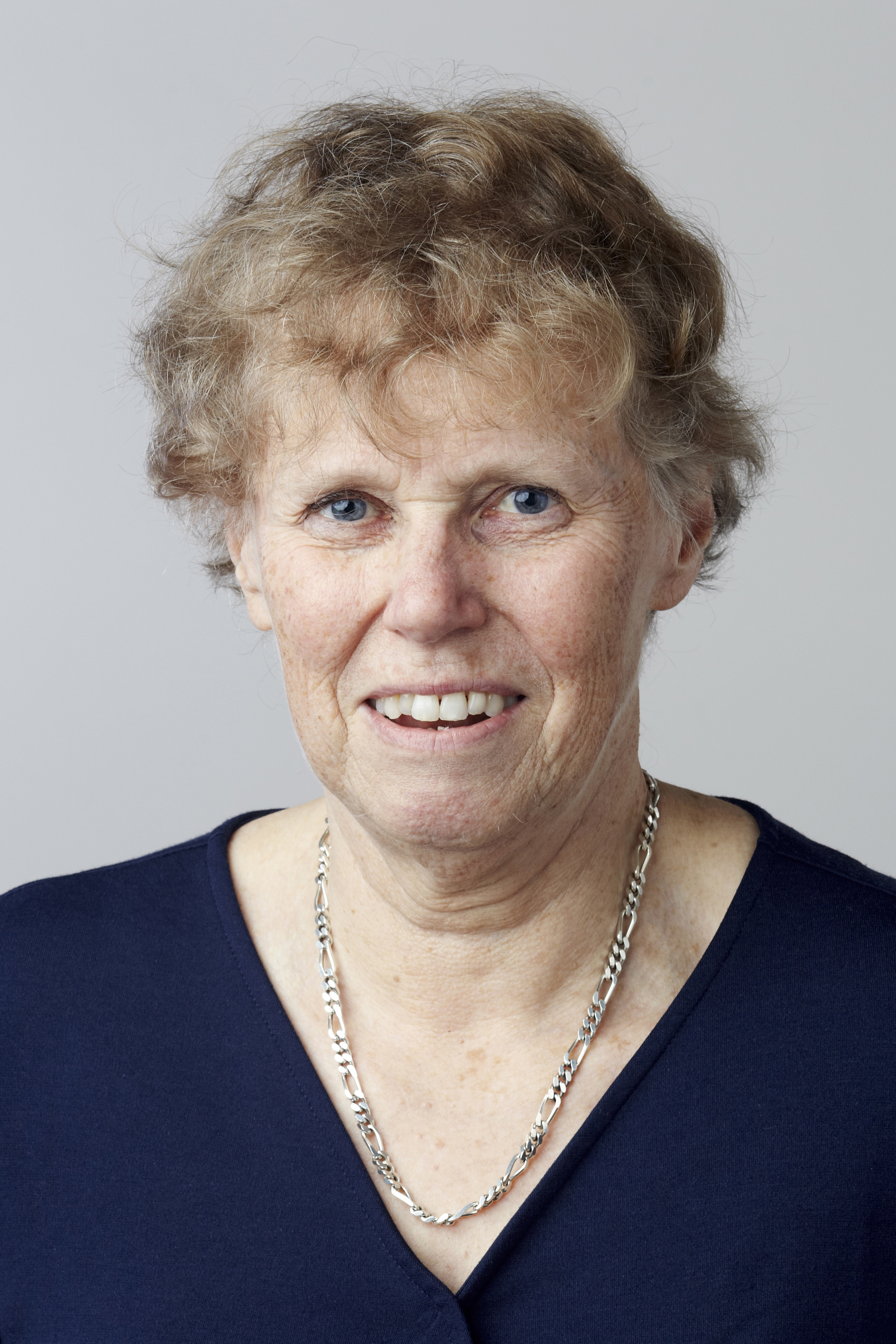
- Dawkins in 2014
- Born: Marian Ellina Stamp; 13 February 1945 (age 81); Hereford, England
- Education: Queen's College, London, Somerville College, Oxford
- Known for: Animal welfare science
- Spouse: Richard Dawkins (m. 1967; div. 1984)
- Scientific career
- Fields: Ethology; Animal welfare
- Workplaces: University of Oxford
- Thesis: The Mechanism of Hunting by 'Searching Image' in Birds (1970)
- Doctoral advisor: Niko Tinbergen
- Website: www.biology.ox.ac.uk/people/marian-stamp-dawkins-frs-cbe

Marian Stamp Dawkins (born Marian Ellina Stamp; 13 February 1945) is a British biologist and professor of ethology at the University of Oxford. Her research interests include vision in birds, animal signalling, behavioural synchrony, animal consciousness and animal welfare.

== Education ==
Dawkins was educated at Queen's College, London and Somerville College, Oxford, where she earned a bachelor's degree and a D.Phil. (1970) degree. Her doctoral research was supervised by Niko Tinbergen.

== Career and research ==
Dawkins was appointed a lecturer in zoology in 1977 and in 1998 was made professor of animal behaviour. She is currently (2014) Head of the Animal Behaviour Research Group.

Dawkins has written extensively on animal behaviour and issues of animal welfare. Along with other academics in the field, such as Ian Duncan, Dawkins promoted the argument that animal welfare is about the feelings of animals. This approach indicates the belief that animals should be considered as sentient beings. Dawkins wrote, "Let us not mince words: Animal welfare involves the subjective feelings of animals.

In 1989, Dawkins published a study in which she filmed hens from above while they performed common behaviours (e.g. turning, standing, wing-stretching). From these films, she calculated the amount of floor-space required by the hens during these behaviours and compared this to the amount of floor-space available in battery cages. She was able to show that many of these common behaviours were highly restricted, or prevented, in battery cages.

In 1990, she contributed to a paper in which she developed her ideas regarding how to assess animal welfare by asking questions of animals. She proposed using preference tests and consumer demand studies to ask what animals prefer (e.g. space, social contact) and how highly motivated they are for these. She argued that animals were more likely to suffer if they were not provided with resources for which they are highly motivated.

Central to her most recent (2012) view on animal welfare is scepticism about whether science can establish that animals have consciousness and therefore its role in definition and measurement of animal welfare and suffering. Instead, her view is that good animal welfare rests on determining the needs and wants of animals, which do not require that they are conscious. These theses are presented in her book Why Animals Matter: Animal Consciousness, Animal Welfare, and Human Well-being (2012). Her views on animal consciousness have been criticised by evolutionary biologist Marc Bekoff, who argues that she too readily rejects anthropomorphic research on animals. She responded to the criticism by stating her position as "wrongly interpreted", and says that "my concern is to make the case for animal emotions as watertight as possible and thereby to strengthen it. That is the way science progresses and always has."

=== Selected publications ===
- Animal Suffering: The Science of Animal Welfare. Chapman and Hall. 1980.
- Unravelling Animal Behaviour. Longman. 1986.
- The Tinbergen legacy. Edited by Marian Stamp Dawkins, Tim R. Halliday and Richard Dawkins. London: Chapman & Hall. 1991.
- Through Our Eyes Only?: The Search for Animal Consciousness. Oxford: Oxford University Press. 1993.
- Living with the Selfish Gene. One of the collected essays in Richard Dawkins: How a Scientist Changed the Way We Think. Editors: Alan Grafen, Mark Ridley. Oxford University Press. 2006.
- The scientific basis for assessing suffering in animals. PDF Version Chapter in Peter Singer: In Defense of Animals: The Second Wave. Malden, MA: Blackwell. 2006.
- Observing Animal Behaviour: Design and Analysis of Quantitative Data. Oxford: Oxford University Press. 2007.
- The Future of Animal Farming: Renewing the Ancient Contract. Edited by Marian Stamp Dawkins and Roland Bonney. Malden, MA: Blackwell. 2008.
- An Introduction to Animal Behaviour. With Aubrey Manning. Cambridge: Cambridge University Press. 2012.
- Why Animals Matter: Animal Consciousness, Animal Welfare, and Human Well-being. Oxford: Oxford University Press. 2012.

=== Awards and honours ===
Dawkins was awarded the RSPCA/British Society for Animal Protection prize in 1991, Association for the Study of Animal Behaviour's Niko Tinbergen Medal in 2009, and the World Poultry Science Association Robert Fraser Gordon Medal in 2011.

Dawkins was appointed Commander of the Order of the British Empire (CBE) in the 2014 New Year Honours for services to animal welfare. In 2014, she was elected a Fellow of the Royal Society (FRS) for “substantial contributions to the improvement of natural knowledge”.

== Personal life ==
She was born in Hereford to Arthur Maxwell Stamp and (Alice) Mary Stamp (née Richards).

On 19 August 1967, she married fellow ethologist Richard Dawkins in the Protestant church in Annestown, County Waterford, Ireland. They divorced in 1984. She remains known as Marian Stamp Dawkins.
