= Captive elephants =

Elephants kept in a confined area

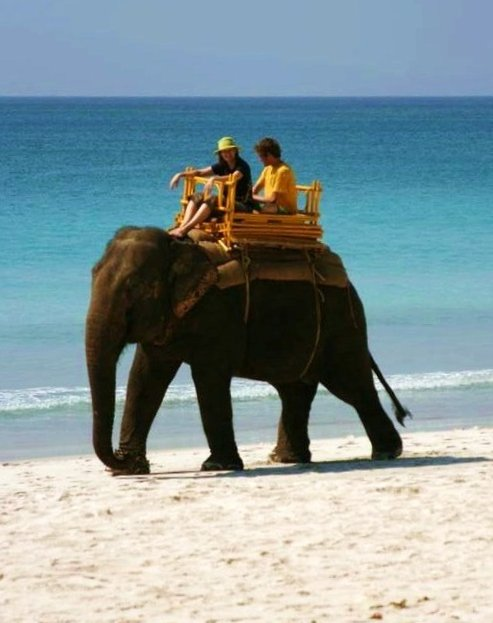
An elephant carrying tourists sitting on a howdah

Elephants can be found in various captive facilities such as a zoo, sanctuary, circus, or camp, usually under veterinary supervision. They can be used for educational, entertainment, or work purposes.

The earliest evidence of captive elephants dates to the Indus Valley Civilization about 4,500 years ago. Since then, captive elephants have been used around the world in war, ceremony, and for labor and entertainment. Captive elephants have been kept in animal collections for at least 3,500 years. The first elephant arrived in North America in 1796. London Zoo, the first scientific zoo, housed elephants beginning in 1831.

Before the 1980s, zoos obtained their elephants by capturing them from the wild. Increased restrictions on the capture of wild elephants and dwindling wild populations caused zoos to turn to captive breeding. The first successful captive birth in North America of an Asian elephant occurred at Oregon Zoo in 1962, while the first African elephant captive birth occurred at Knoxville Zoological Gardens in 1978. Today, most zoos obtain their elephants primarily through breeding, though occasionally zoos will obtain elephants from semi-captive work camps in Asia or rescue elephants that would otherwise be culled in Africa. Without an increase in birth rates or an influx of wild elephants, practitioners fear that captive elephant populations could become non-viable within 50 years.

In 2006, 286 elephants were kept in American zoos (147 African elephants and 139 Asian elephants). Nearly one in three Asian elephants lives in captivity—about 15,000 in total—mostly in work camps, temples, and ecotourism sites in the countries in which they naturally occur. The International Union for Conservation of Nature (IUCN) estimates the total population of Asian elephants in the wild is 40,000 to 50,000, and that of African elephants in the wild is 400,000 to 600,000.

== History ==
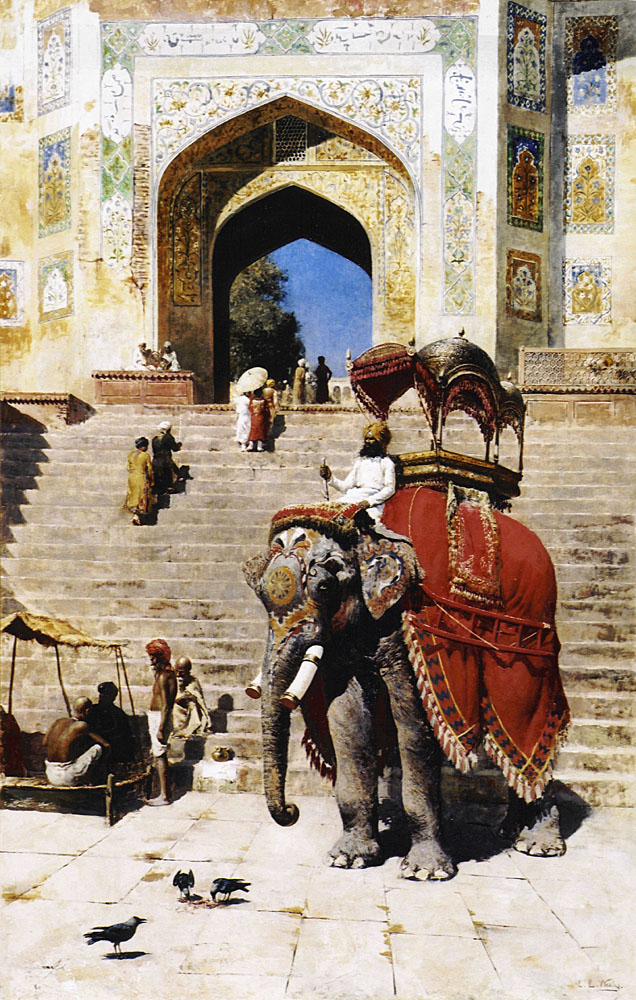
An elephant wearing a caparison (decorative covering), 19th century, India

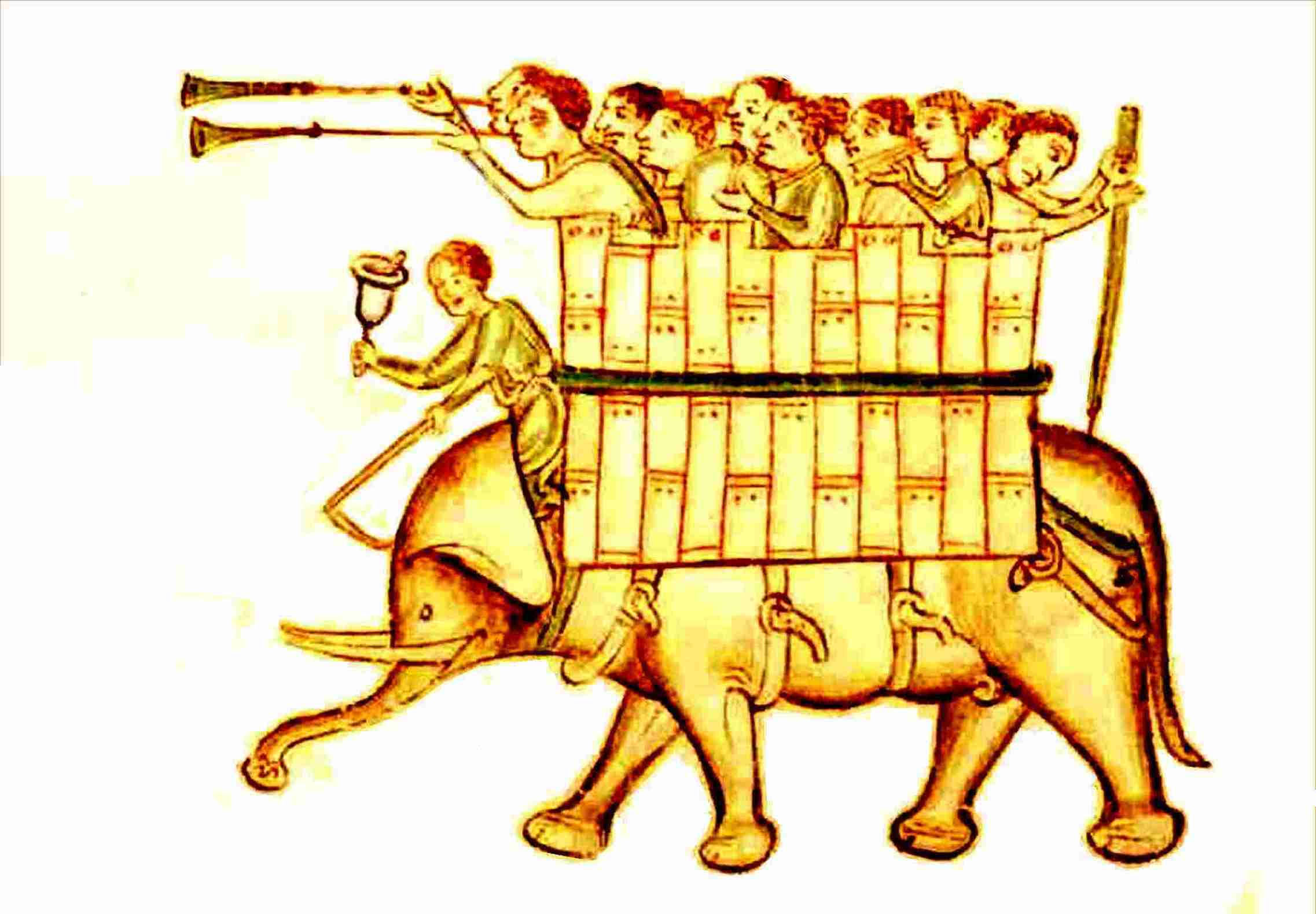
Elephant drawing, c.1250, from historic writings by English monk Matthew Paris.

Tame elephants have been recorded since the Indus Valley civilization around 2,000 BCE. With mahouts, they have been used as working animals in forestry, as war elephants (by commanders such as Hannibal), for cultural and ceremonial use (such as temple elephants), as a method of execution, for public displays such as circus elephants, in elephant polo and in zoological gardens.

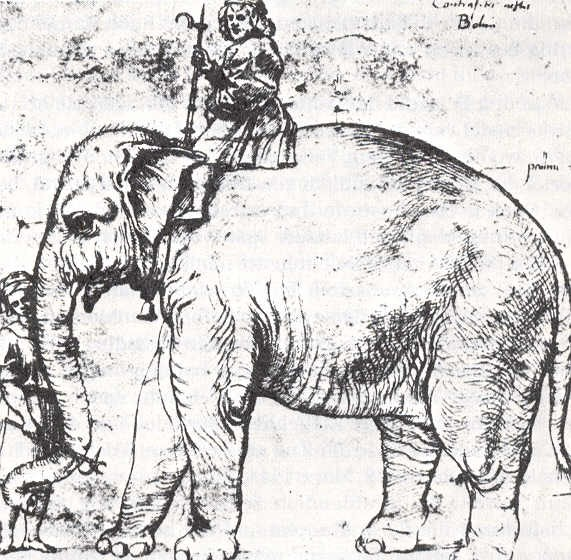
Sketch of Hanno, the pet white elephant of Pope Leo X, by Raphael, c.1514

The expression white elephant derives from a white elephant being considered sacred and therefore disqualified from useful work, yet posing a large ownership cost. The origin of the expression is from the story that the kings of Siam gave white elephants as a gift to courtiers they disliked, in order to ruin the recipient by the great expense incurred in maintaining the animal.

== Behaviour and training ==
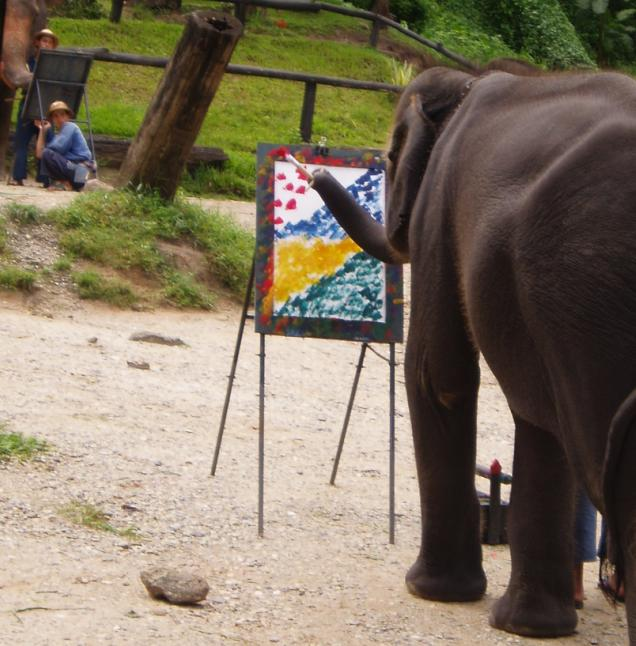
An elephant painting

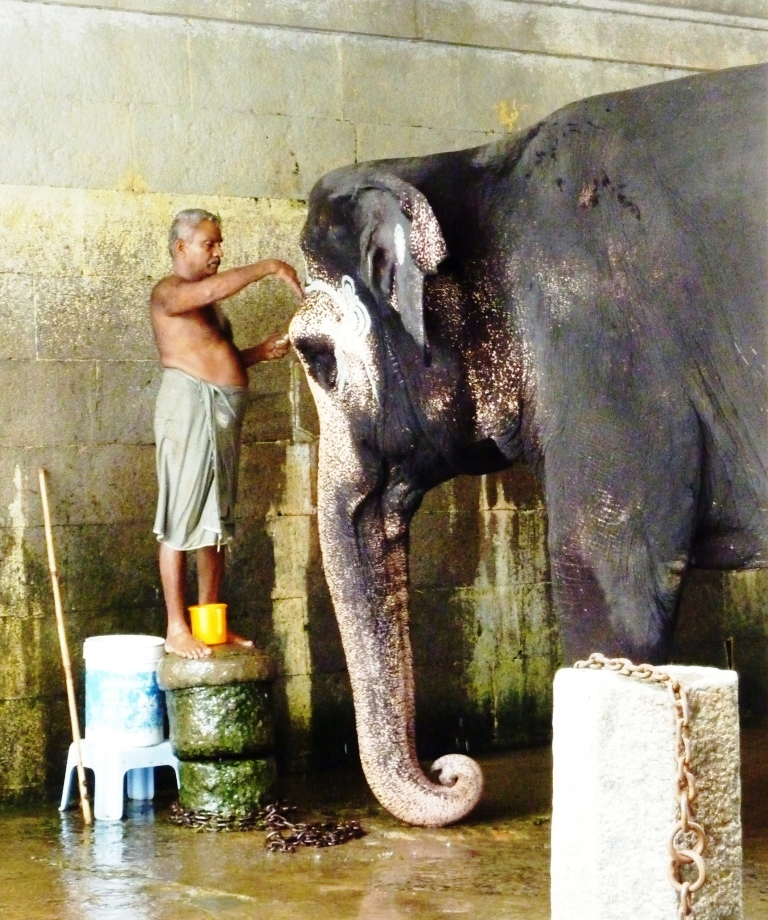
A temple elephant being washed at a Hindu temple in Kanchipuram, Tamil Nadu

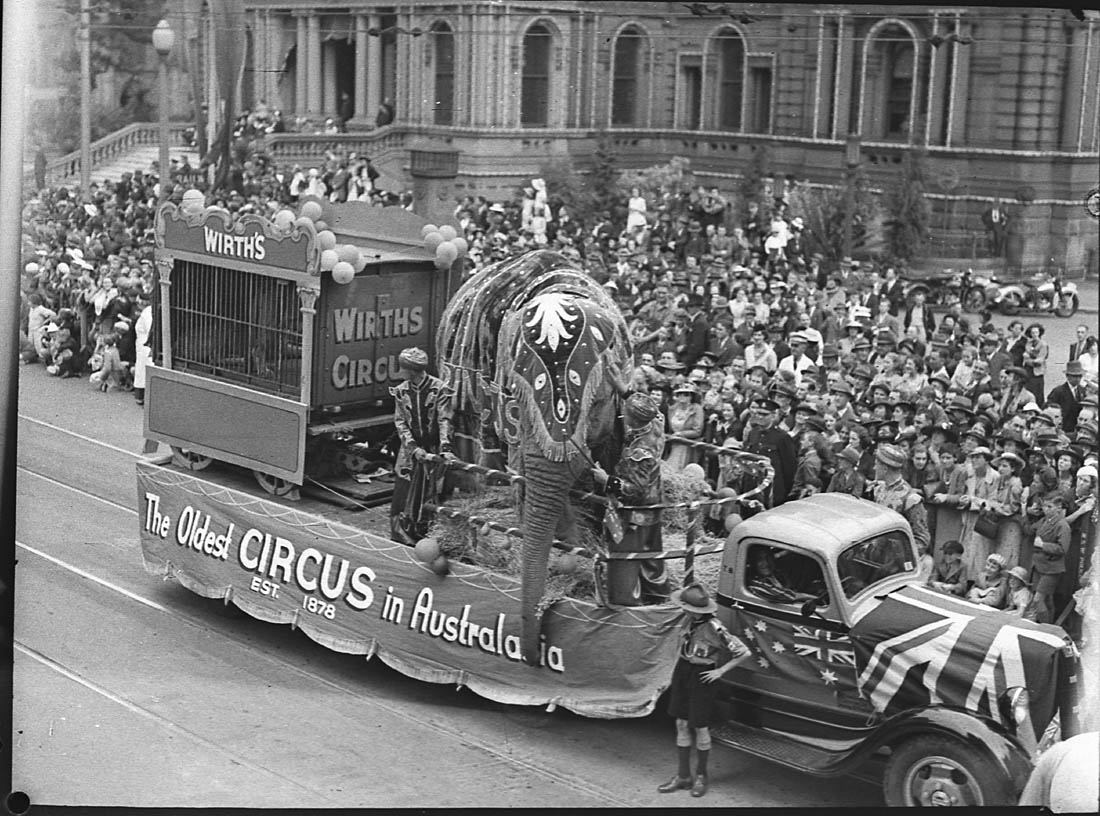
Elephant from Wirth's Circus in a Sydney street parade (1938)

Elephants have the largest brains of all land animals, and ever since the time of Ancient Greek philosopher Aristotle, have been renowned for their cognitive skills, with behavioural patterns shared with humans. Pliny the Elder described the animal as being closest to a human in sensibilities. They also have a longer lifespan than most livestock. Elephants exhibit a wide variety of behaviors, including those associated with grief, learning, allomothering, mimicry, play, altruism, use of tools, compassion, cooperation, self-awareness, memory, vengeance, and language.

In the wild, elephant herds usually consist of a matriarch who leads a stable group of related adult females and their young offspring. When male elephants reach maturity (usually by the age of 12) they disperse from the herds and live on their own or join groups called bachelor herds, where they associate with other males during the times of the year that they are not sexually active. When males are sexually active, they enter a state called musth, during which time they roam widely, searching for available females. During this time, they are extremely aggressive toward other males they encounter.

In captivity, providing elephants with a social structure that resembles their own natural lifestyle is difficult in part given that moving elephants between different facilities to mimic male dispersal or facilitate breeding is a logistically challenging task, but also because extreme aggression of adult male elephants while in musth poses a health and safety threat to keepers and other animal species, and, to a lesser degree, to other elephants.

=== Training ===
Elephants in captivity can be trained to perform a variety of tasks. Elephants can remember tone, melody, and words, allowing them to recognise more than 20 verbal commands.

In Nepal, elephants are ridden by forest rangers to patrol national forests and for entertainment by tourists. In Myanmar, elephants assist in logging operations. In North America, Australasia, and Europe, elephants are primarily trained for circuses, where they may be trained to perform tricks for the entertainment of crowds, and in zoos, where they may be trained to participate in their own husbandry by, for example, presenting their feet for nail trims or opening their mouth for dental exams. The use of elephants in circuses is controversial; public outcry caused Ringling Bros. and Barnum & Bailey circuses in the United States to commit to retiring their elephants to a private sanctuary in 2015.

There are three primary training styles that can be used either separately or together in elephant facilities, each with its own pros and cons for elephant welfare and human safety:

- Free contact: The elephant is handled directly and the elephant and keeper share the same space while they interact. Some facilities use free contact to allow their elephants a great deal of physical freedom, for example leading elephants on walks. Increased exercise of this type can prevent elephants from gaining excessive weight, which can lessen the instance of health problems in joints and feet. Access to medical examination is also unparalleled with free contact systems—veterinarians and keepers can train free contact elephants to allow for many kinds of medical examinations, including dental procedures and blood draws. However, free contact is controversial among practitioners and the public. It requires the use of ankuses, also known as guides, bullhooks, or goads. An ankus consists of a hook attached to a handle and is used in training to guide elephants into the correct position. The ankus can be used on occasion for physical punishment. Additionally, free contact can pose a danger to handlers. All elephants, but especially males in musth, pose hazards to people. There have been several incidents of elephants killing handlers and keepers when being worked in a free contact system. The Association of Zoos and Aquariums (AZA) in the United States is phasing out the use of free contact with elephants in its member zoos.
- Protected contact: Elephant and keeper never share the same unrestricted space. Instead, keepers interact with elephants through a barrier, and elephants are free to leave the contact area at will. Elephants in a protected contact situation are typically trained through a positive reinforcement system with rewards when training progress is achieved. Well-trained elephants in a protected contact system can allow veterinarians and handlers to have good access for routine care, though not as comprehensively as in free contact systems. Some elephants, especially ill elephants that may not be capable of entering the protected contact area and young elephants that have not yet been trained for protected contact, may be harder to access for veterinary care in a protected contact facility. Protected contact facilities are also unable to take their elephants for walks, which may increase the incidence of obesity and health problems in their elephant populations.
- No contact: No elephant handling takes place unless the elephant is under chemical sedation. Elephants can be moved from one place to another by allowing and disallowing access to different locations, but any medical care or routine maintenance must occur under sedation. The AZA does not allow no contact systems in their member zoos, as they require all elephants to be trained to participate in their own care, including presenting their feet for nail trims, allowing for exams of their ears, eyes, mouth, and teeth, and allowing their blood to be collected. Chemical sedation of an elephant is risky and can cause harm to the animal or to the people immobilizing the animal. As such, minimizing the need for anesthesia as much as possible is desirable in most situations. The lack of training in no contact systems also means that elephants do not receive the enrichment benefits that come with regular voluntary training with positive reinforcement. Despite these concerns, some facilities use no contact systems for particularly aggressive or dangerous elephants, particularly males during musth.

Some facilities will use a combination of these handling methods, and will for example use free contact with their female elephants and protected contact with their more dangerous males.

== Reproduction ==
Most elephant populations in captivity in North America, Europe, and Asia are not self-sustaining, meaning that without an increase in birth rates or importation of wild individuals, some captive populations will be extinct within 50 years. Some hurdles to captive reproduction include female infertility (the causes of which are not fully understood) and an overrepresentation of males in the captive population.

As such, substantial effort has gone into increasing the birth rate in captive elephant populations. Due to the size, intelligence, and strong social bonds of elephants, moving elephants from facility to facility for the purpose of breeding can engender severe logistic hurdles and cause stress to the elephants moved, as well as the elephants present in the new facility. It may be preferable to relocate young males, who would naturally disperse away from their herds of birth in the wild, as opposed to females, who would normally stay with their herd of birth for life in the wild.

Because of the stress and logistics involved in moving elephants from one facility to another, some managers are turning to artificial insemination to produce offspring. Semen may be collected from males in other collections or from wild males to further increase the genetic diversity of the captive population.

=== Hand-rearing ===
Successful hand-rearing of orphaned calves depends critically on the milk formula used. Human infant formula is commonly used, but requires supplementation with bovine colostrum (commercially available in substitute form), and lactobacillus to protect the gastrointestinal tract. To provide additional fat, desiccated coconut and butterfat are added, with vitamin and mineral supplements, in particular vitamin E, vitamin B, and calcium. Rice water strained from cooked rice and glutinous rice broth are useful and are added to the formula to combat diarrhea. Rice cereal, milled whole barley or oatmeal, desiccated coconut, and other ground solid foods are added to the milk of older calves to ease the transition to solid foods.

== Welfare ==
Elephants are complex animals with many varied welfare requirements in captivity. Principles of animal welfare dictate that animals should be housed in appropriate environments with consideration for species-typical biology and behavior.

Animal welfare concerns about elephants in captivity stem from the uniqueness of elephants' social structure, biology, size, and spatial requirements. In the wild, elephants sometimes walk 50 miles a day, while the Association of Zoos and Aquariums (AZA) in the United States recommends a minimum of 5400 ft^{2} (500 m^{2}) of space per elephant in outdoor habitats for their member zoos. Proponents of elephants in zoos argue that wild elephants walk long distances because of the necessity of finding water, food, or mates, but that captive elephants do not require the same amount of walking if resources are more readily available.

In the wild, elephant herds (particularly those of African elephants) can be quite large. The AZA requires their member facilities to house at least three females, two males, or three mixed-sex individuals in order to mimic wild herd structure, though this is much smaller than many wild herds. In 2008, a study of mainly European and North American zoos found that one-fifth of elephants in these zoos lived alone or with only one other elephant and that the mean number of elephants held in these zoos was 4.28. In recent years, there has been some progress in integrating smaller elephant herds across different zoos into larger groups, though advancement in this area is ongoing.

There has been some effort to understand which behaviors in captive elephants indicate good welfare and which indicate welfare concerns. In 2015, the Department for Environment, Food, and Rural Affairs (DEFRA) in the United Kingdom developed a set of indicators that practitioners and oversight bodies can use to determine the state of an individual elephant's welfare in captivity. This report was compiled in response to an earlier government report that indicated that many elephants in UK zoos experienced issues with foot health, obesity, and stereotypies. Important indicators of welfare included:

- Stereotypies: including head bobbing, swaying, and pacing (as a negative indicator of welfare)
- Comfort behavior: including wallowing, swimming, and dust bathing (as a positive indicator of welfare)
- Feeding (as a positive indicator)
- Interacting with the environment (as a positive indicator)
- Interacting with other elephants (as a positive indicator, except for excessive aggression, which is a negative indicator)

== Health ==
=== Infectious diseases ===
==== Tuberculosis ====
According to a report published by the Centers for Disease Control, in North America, approximately 2% of African, and 12% of Asian captive elephants are thought to be infected with tuberculosis.

In 2012, two elephants in Tete d'Or Zoo, Lyon (France), were diagnosed with tuberculosis. Due to the threat of transmitting tuberculosis to other animals or visitors to the zoo, their euthanasia was initially ordered by city authorities but a court later overturned this decision.

At an elephant sanctuary in Tennessee, a quarantined 54-year-old African elephant being treated for tuberculosis was considered to be the source of latent (inactive) tuberculosis infections in eight workers.

In 2018, a bronchoalveolar lavage technique was proposed for tuberculosis diagnosis in elephants. This technique is safer to the operator, has a higher sensitivity, and is less prone to contamination than the traditional trunk wash approach.

==== Elephant endotheliotropic herpesvirus ====
Elephant endotheliotropic herpesvirus (EEHV) is a family of herpesviruses that have been known to cause the death of more than 100 young Asian elephant calves in the wild and in captivity since 1988. In North America, EEHV has been responsible for 58% of the deaths of Asian elephants in captivity between the ages of 4 months and 15 years that were born between 1962 and 2007. EEHV has also caused the death of Asian elephant calves in captivity in Europe and Asia, as well as wild calves.

The first recognized fatal case of EEHV in an Asian elephant was identified at the National Zoo in Washington, D.C., in 1995, but subsequent investigation of stored tissue samples found evidence of fatal cases of EEHV in captivity dating back to at least 1988. Testing has shown that these viruses appears to be carried in latency (without symptoms) in most Asian and African elephant adults, and that these adults tend to become infectious when they experience stress or excitement, including after the birth of a calf. Asian elephant calves are extremely susceptible to the virus during the period after they have been weaned from their mother's milk, when they are no longer protected by maternal antibodies. Active EEHV infection causes small nodules on the head and trunk, and inside the lungs of individuals with mild cases.

In fatal attacks (usually caused by the EEHV 1A strain), the virus acts quickly, usually causing death within one hour to seven days within the onset of symptoms when untreated. Symptoms include lethargy, unwillingness to eat, lameness, colic, and diarrhea. The virus causes widespread hemorrhaging of endothelial tissue.

There is no cure for EEHV, but zoos have developed some treatments that have shown some effectiveness in suppressing the virus and preventing fatality. The European Association of Zoos and Aquaria's (EAZA) treatment guidelines recommend administering fluid therapy, fresh plasma from adult elephants that have antibodies against the virus, and antiviral drugs including famciclovir, ganciclovir, or acyclovir. Of elephants that have been treated for severe EEHV, there is an approximate 40% survival rate.

=== Noninfectious diseases ===
==== Foot and musculoskeletal diseases ====
In 2006, a study found that 33% of North American zoos reported at least one elephant with a foot abnormality, 36% reported at least one elephant with arthritis, and 18% reported at least one case of lameness in their elephant populations within the previous year.

Common foot problems among captive elephants include overgrown nails, soles, and cuticles, necrotic pododermatitis, the formation of abscesses, and split nails and soles. Though these conditions do not usually cause mortality on their own, they are often the reason that captive facilities choose to euthanize their elephants due to quality of life concerns. As such, many elephant facilities perform regular foot care in hopes of preventing serious, chronic foot problems. In the wild, elephants' feet are worn down as elephants walk, and the goal of captive foot care is to simulate this wearing-down effect. Elephants in free contact or protected contact facilities can be trained to accept and assist with routine foot care, including nail filing and trimming of the foot pad. Elephants that are not trained must be anesthetized to accept foot care, which brings an element of risk for elephant and handler alike.

Common musculoskeletal problems include degenerative joint disease, osteoarthritis, trauma, and soft tissue strains. Due to their large body mass and long life, elephants are thought to be especially prone to these problems as they age. The relatively sedentary lifestyle of a captive elephant in comparison to its wild counterparts likely contributes to these issues.

A 2016 study of North American zoos found that predictors of poor foot health included older age, more time spent on hard floors, less space in nighttime enclosures, and a high percentage of time spent in exhibits that allowed choice between being indoors or outdoors. The same study found correlations between poor musculoskeletal health and more time spent on hard floors and lack of space in daytime exhibits. It is thought that using soft sand on floors and providing access to grass, dirt, or sand outside, giving elephants increased space in their day and night enclosures, and avoiding large changes in temperature and humidity between indoor and outdoor spaces may improve foot and musculoskeletal health.

==== Obesity ====
A 2016 study of North American zoos found that 74% of zoo elephants were overweight or obese. The effects of obesity on elephants have not been widely studied, but based on research in other species, it may be correlated with higher instances of infertility, arthritis, and cardiovascular disease.

Higher incidence of obesity in zoo elephants appears to be correlated with high diversity of food offered, less exercise, and a regular feeding schedule, suggesting that facilities that wish to lessen obesity in their elephant collection should walk their elephants frequently and feed them a few food types at unpredictable times of day.

== See also ==
- An Apology to Elephants (2013 documentary film)
- List of individual elephants
- Khedda
- Thai Elephant Orchestra
