= Running wheel =

Running wheel may refer to:

- Alternative name for a carrying wheel on a steam locomotive
- Hamster wheel
