= Mouse wheel =

Mouse wheel or mousewheel may refer to:

- Hamster wheel
- Treadmill
- Treadwheel
- The scroll wheel of a computer mouse
