= C. W. Hume =

British animal welfare activist and writer

- Hume in 1956
- Born: Charles Westley Hume; 13 January 1886
- Died: 22 September 1981 (aged 95)
- Military career
- Allegiance: United Kingdom

Charles Westley Hume (13 January 1886 – 22 September 1981) OBE MC BSc was a British animal welfare worker and writer. He was the founder of the University of London Animal Welfare Society (ULAWS).

== Biography ==
Hume graduated in physics from Birkbeck College. He was honorary secretary of the British Science Guild and edited the journal Proceedings of the Physical Society (1919–1940). He served in the Royal Engineers during World War 1 and the 47th Divisional Signals (Territorial Army) during World War 2.

Hume founded the University of London Animal Welfare Society (ULAWS) in 1926, which later became the Universities Federation for Animal Welfare (UFAW). He has also been credited as the first to use the expression "animal welfare". Through his efforts the first book on the care and management of laboratory animals was published by the UFAW in 1947. Richard P. Haynes has suggested that "Hume should be credited as the father of the animal welfare movement".

Hume's book Man and Beast (1962) explores the history, law, philosophy and theology underlying cruelty to animals. A review noted that "these subjects are dealt with objectively and clearly, lightly yet seriously, tactfully yet persistently, especially in the factual and historical aspects."

In 1956, Hume received the Schweitzer Medal for his contributions to animal welfare. The Charles Hume Memorial Fund was set up in his honour.

== Selected publications ==
- Law and Practice: The Rights of Laboratory Animals. In The UFAW Handbook on the Care and Management of Laboratory Animals (Edited by Alastair N. Worden, 1947)
- The Status of Animals in the Christian Religion (1956)
- Man and Beast (1962)

== See also ==
- UFAW Handbook
