= Elephant goad =

Instrument in training elephants

A drawing of an elephant goad.

The elephant goad, bullhook, or ankusha is a tool employed by mahout in the handling and training of elephants. The pointed tip of an elephant goad or a bullhook could be used to stab the elephant's head if the elephant charged nearby people, risking injury or death to the rider and bystanders. The elephant goad consists of a hook (usually bronze or steel) which is attached to a 60–90 cm (2.0–3.0 ft) handle, ending in a tapered end.

A relief at Sanchi and a fresco at the Ajanta Caves depict a three-person crew on the war elephant, the driver with an elephant goad, what appears to be a noble warrior behind the driver and another attendant on the posterior of the elephant.

Nossov and Dennis (2008: p. 19) report that two perfectly preserved elephant goads were recovered from an archaeological site at Taxila and are dated from 3rd century BCE to the 1st century CE according to Marshall. The larger of the two is 65 cm (26 in) long.

Nossov and Dennis (2008: p. 16) state:

An ankusha, a sharpened goad with a pointed hook, was the main tool for managing an elephant. The ankusha first appeared in India in the 6th-5th century BC and has been used ever since, not only there, but wherever elephants served man.

== Fabrication and construction ==
The handle can be made of any material, from wood to ivory, depending on the wealth and opulence of the owner. Contemporary bullhooks which are used for animal handling generally have handles made of fibreglass, metal, plastic, or wood.

The elephant goad is found in armouries and temples all across India, where elephants march in religious processions and perform in various civil capacities. They are often quite ornate, being decorated with gemstones and engravings to be appropriate for the ceremonies in which they are used.

=== Iconography ===
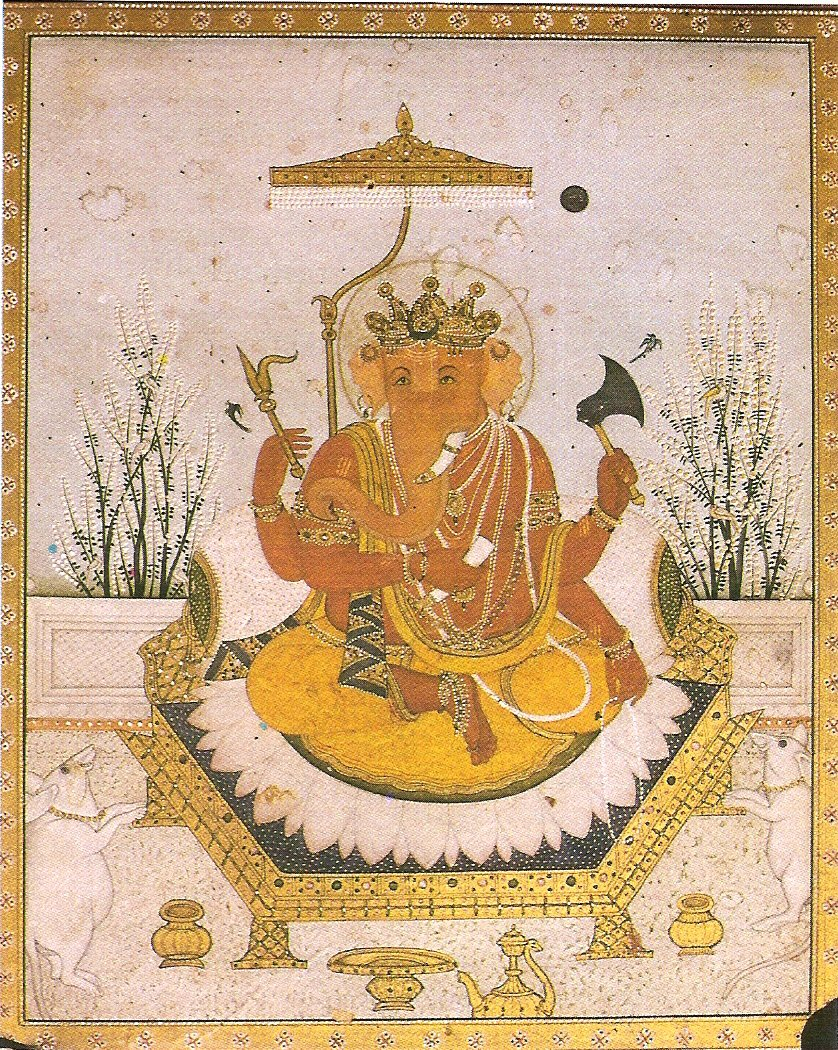
The Hindu god Ganesha holding an elephant goad in his right upper arm

The elephant has appeared in cultures across the world. They are a symbol of wisdom in Asian cultures and are famed for their memory and intelligence, where they are thought to be on par with cetaceans and hominids. Aristotle once said the elephant was "the beast which passeth all others in wit and mind". The word "elephant" has its origins in the Greek ἐλέφας, meaning "ivory" or "elephant".

In iconography and ceremonial ritual tools, the elephant goad is often included in a hybridized tool, for example one that includes elements of Vajrakila, 'hooked knife' or 'skin flail' (Tibetan: gri-gug, Sanskrit: kartika), Vajra and Axe, as well as the goad functionality for example. Ritual ankusha were often finely wrought of precious metals and even fabricated from ivory, often encrusted with jewels. In Indian religions, the goad/ankusha and rope 'noose/snare/lasso' (Sanskrit: Pāśa) are traditionally paired as tools of subjugation.

=== Hinduism ===
An elephant goad is one of the eight auspicious objects known as Ashtamangala in Hinduism and certain other religions of the Indian subcontinent. A goad is also an attribute of many Hindu gods, especially Tripura Sundari & Ganesha. It is present as one of the marks, next to a lotus flower on the right foot (sole) of Krishna.

=== Buddhism ===
Wallace and Goleman (2006: p. 79) discuss 'śamatha' (Sanskrit), mindfulness and introspection which they tie to metacognition:

Throughout Buddhist literature, the training in shamatha is often likened to training a wild elephant, and the two primary instruments for this are the tether of mindfulness and the goad of introspection.

Rowlands (2001: p. 124) in discussing consciousness and its self-conscious, self-reflexive quality of apperception states that:

The most significant aspect of consciousness, I shall try to show, is its structure, its hybrid character. Consciousness can be both act and object of experience. Using the somewhat metaphorical notion of directing, we might say that consciousness is not only the directing of awareness but can be that upon which awareness is directed. Consciousness is not only the act of conscious experience, it can be experience's object. [italics preserved from original]

In the above quotation the metaphor of 'directing' is employed. In 'directing' consciousness or the mind to introspectively apperceive the directive forded by the goad is key.

==== Tattvasamgraha Tantra ====
In the Tattvasamgraha tantra (c 7th century), one of the most important tantras of the Buddhist Yoga Tantra Class, the ankusha figures in the visualization of one of the retinue. This tantra explains the process of the visualization of the Vajradhatu Mandala, which is one of the most visually stylized of Buddhist mandalas. The Ankusha is the symbolic attribute for the visualization of the Bodhisattva Vajraraja, an emanation within the retinue of Vajradhatu. This visualization is treated in Tachikawa (c2000: p. 237).

== Literature ==
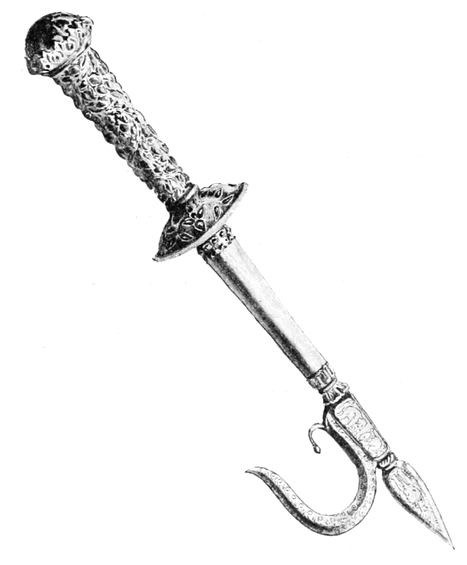
Illustration by John Lockwood Kipling from page 139 of 'The Second Jungle Book' by Rudyard Kipling, published in 1895

In Rudyard Kipling's Second Jungle Book story "The King's Ankus", Mowgli finds the magnificently-jeweled elephant goad of the title in a hidden treasure chamber. Not realizing the value men place on jewels, he later casually discards it in the jungle, unwittingly leading to a chain of greed and murder amongst those who find it after him. A jeweled goad also appears in the 1942 film adaptation Rudyard Kipling's Jungle Book.

== See also ==
- Aṇkuśāsana, elephant goad pose in hatha yoga
