= Behavioral enrichment =

Techniques for stimulating captive animals

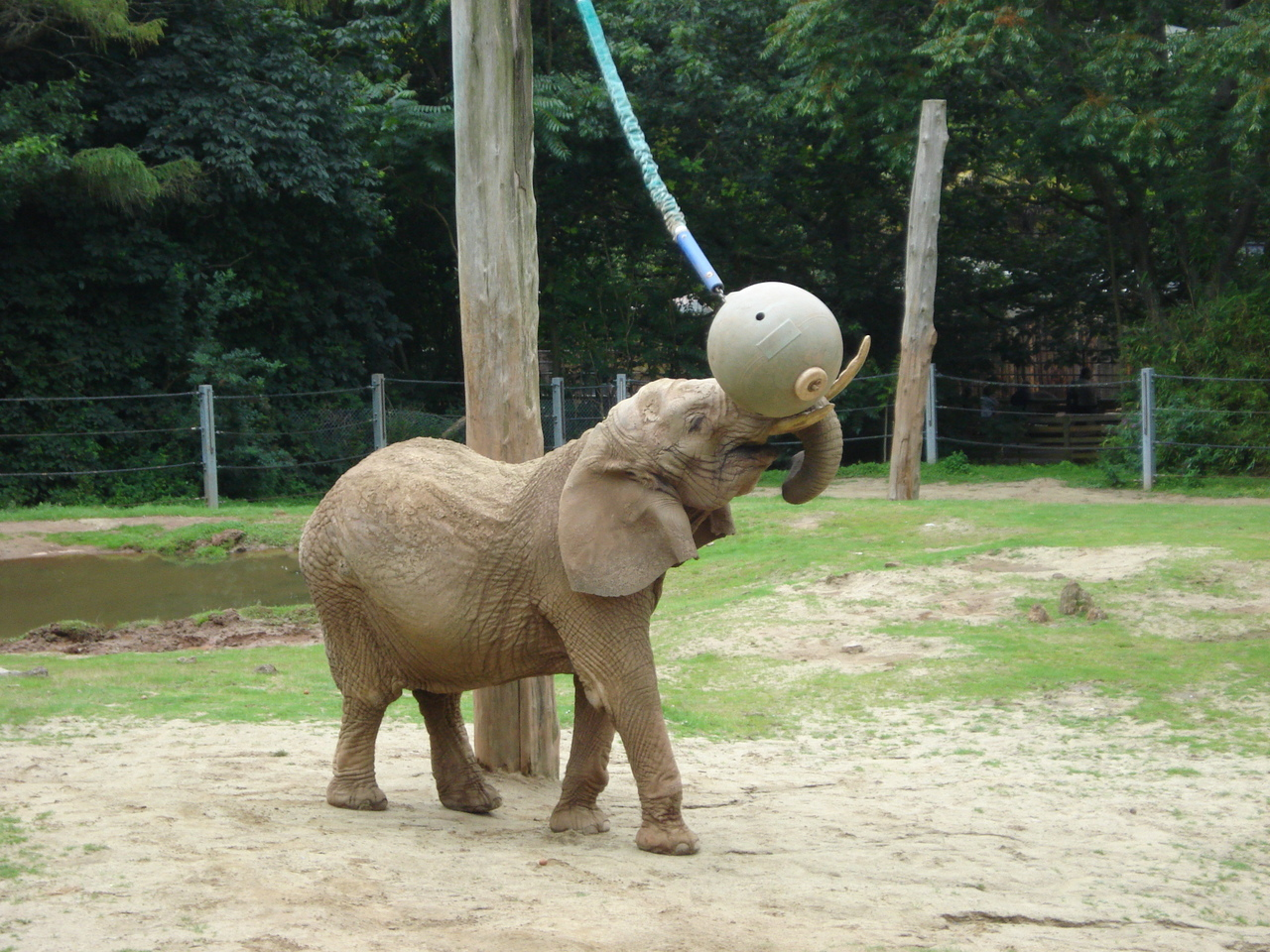
An African bush elephant in a zoo manipulating a suspended ball provided as environmental enrichment

Behavioral enrichment is an animal husbandry principle that seeks to enhance the quality of captive animal care by identifying and providing the environmental stimuli necessary for optimal psychological and physiological well-being. Enrichment can either be active or passive, depending on whether it requires direct contact between the animal and the enrichment. A variety of enrichment techniques are used to create desired outcomes similar to an animal's individual and species' history. Each of the techniques used is intended to stimulate the animal's senses similarly to how they would be activated in the wild. Provided enrichment may be seen in the form of auditory, olfactory, habitat factors, food, research projects, training, and objects.

== Purpose ==
Environmental enrichment can improve the overall welfare of animals in captivity and create a habitat similar to what they would experience in their wild environment. It aims to maintain an animal's physical and psychological health by increasing the range or number of species-specific behaviors, increasing positive interaction with the captive environment, preventing or reducing the frequency of abnormal behaviors, such as stereotypies, and increasing the individual's ability to cope with the challenges of captivity. Stereotypies are seen in captive animals due to stress and boredom. This includes pacing, self-harm, over-grooming, head-weaving, etc.

Environmental enrichment can be offered to any animal in captivity, including:

- Animals in zoos and related facilities
- Animals in sanctuaries
- Animals in shelters and adoption centers
- Animals used for research
- Animals used for companionship, e.g. dogs, cats, rabbits, etc.

Environmental enrichment can be beneficial to a wide range of vertebrates and invertebrates such as land mammals, marine mammals, and amphibians. In the United States, specific regulations (Animal Welfare Act of 1966) must be followed for enrichment plans in order to guarantee, regulate, and provide appropriate living environments and stimulation for animals in captivity. Moreover, the Association of Zoos and Aquariums (also known as the AZA), requires that animal husbandry and welfare be a main concern for those caring for animals in captivity.

== Passive enrichment ==
Passive enrichment provides sensory stimulation but no direct contact or control. This type of enrichment is commonly used for its potential to benefit several animals simultaneously as well as requiring limited direct animal contact.

=== Visual enrichment ===
Visual enrichment is typically provided by changing the layout of an animal's holding area. The type of visual enrichment can vary, from something as simple as adding pictures on walls to videotapes and television. Visual enrichment such as television can especially benefit animals housed in single cages.

Mirrors are also a potential form of enrichment, specifically for animals that display an understanding of self-recognition, such as non-human primates. In addition to using mirrors to reflect the animal's own image, mirrors can also be angled so the animal is able to see normally out-of-sight areas of the holding area.

Enclosures in modern zoos are often designed to facilitate environmental enrichment. For example, the Denver Zoo's exhibit Predator Ridge allows different African carnivores to be rotated among several enclosures, providing the animals with a differently sized environment.

=== Auditory enrichment ===
In the wild, animals are exposed to a variety of sounds that they normally do not encounter in captivity. Auditory enrichment can be used to mimic the animal's natural habitat. Types of nature-based auditory enrichment include rain forest sounds and con-specific vocalizations.

The most common form of auditory enrichment is music, whose principal stems primarily from its benefit to humans. The effects of classical music have been studied in multiple species, including sows and non-human primates. Studies have also looked at various other genres, such as pop and rock, but their ability to provide effective enrichment remains inconclusive. Most types of music that are selected for enrichment are based on human preferences, causing anthropomorphic biases that may not translate to other animals. Therefore, music that is specifically attuned to the animal's auditory senses could be beneficial.

== Active enrichment ==
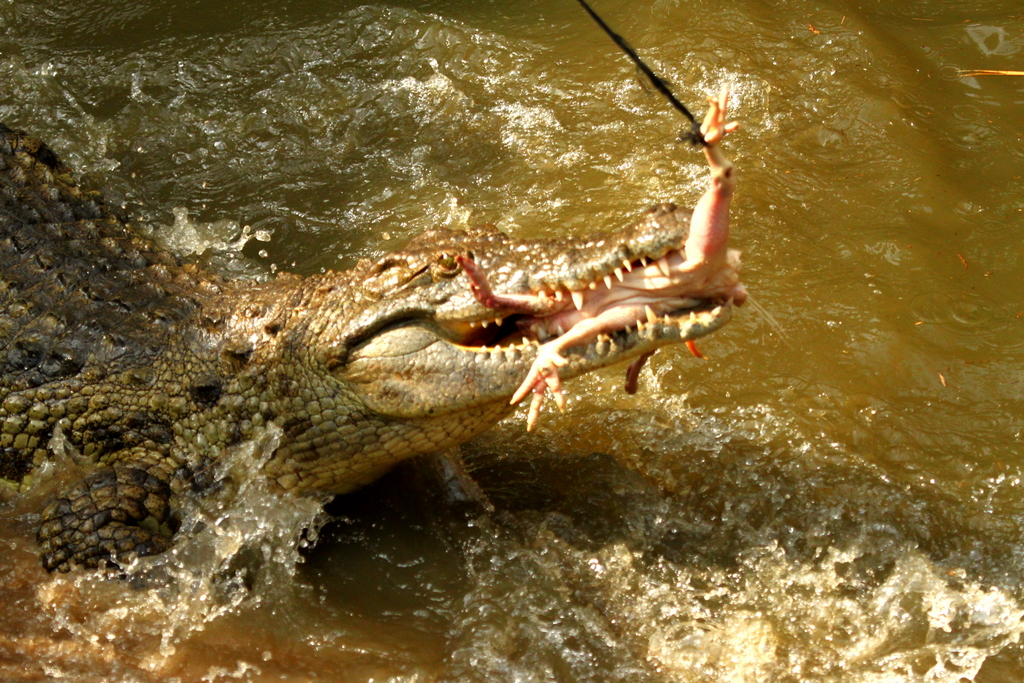
Active enrichment during feeding session

Active enrichment often requires the animal to perform some sort of physical activity as well as direct interaction with the enrichment object. Active enrichment items can temporarily reduce stereotypic behaviors as their beneficial effects are usually limited to the short periods of active use.

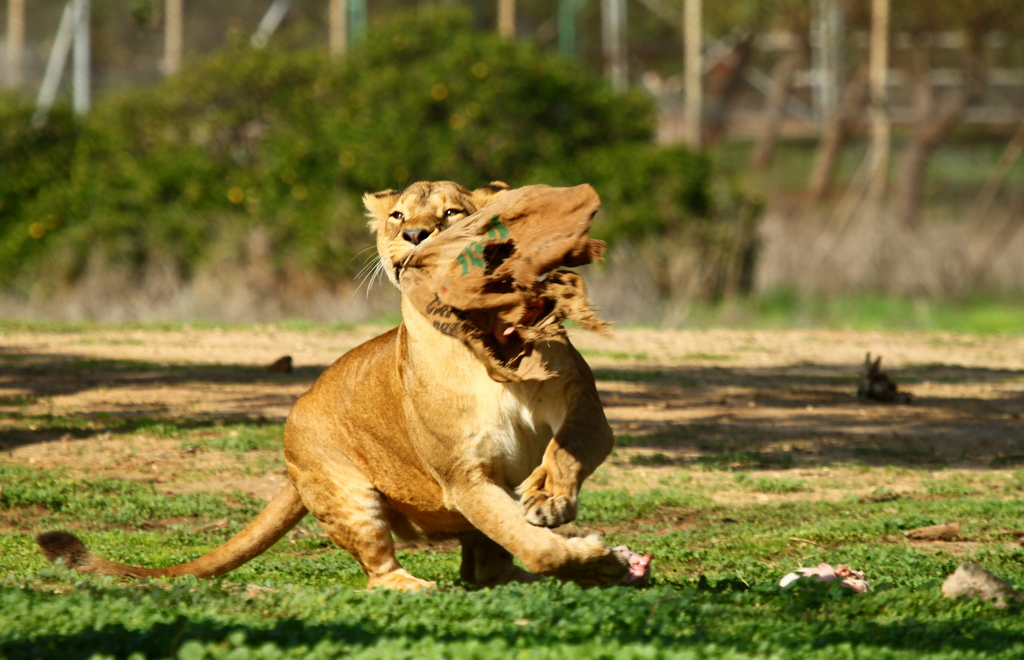
Inanimate tactile enrichment with burlap bag

=== Food-based enrichment ===
Food-based enrichment is meant to mimic what a captive animal would do in the wild to obtain nourishment. This is extremely important because in the wild, animals are adapted to work hard for what they eat, with finding food consuming a significant portion of the animal's time and energy. This experience must be emulated in captivity, as food is usually much more readily available. Feeding enrichment techniques provide opportunities for the animal to indulge in natural, active behaviors that allow for more stimulation and prevent boredom. This can aid both the physical and mental health of a captive animal.

For example, food can be hidden and spread across an enclosure making the animal actively search for it. Other common manipulable tactile objects include rubber toys stuffed with treats. Instead of providing the food directly, foraging devices are useful in increasing the amount of searching and foraging of food, comparable to the amount of time they would spend in the wild. Most food-based enrichment occurs in the context of searching for food, such as cracking open a nut or digging holes in tree trunks for worms.

=== Structural enrichment ===
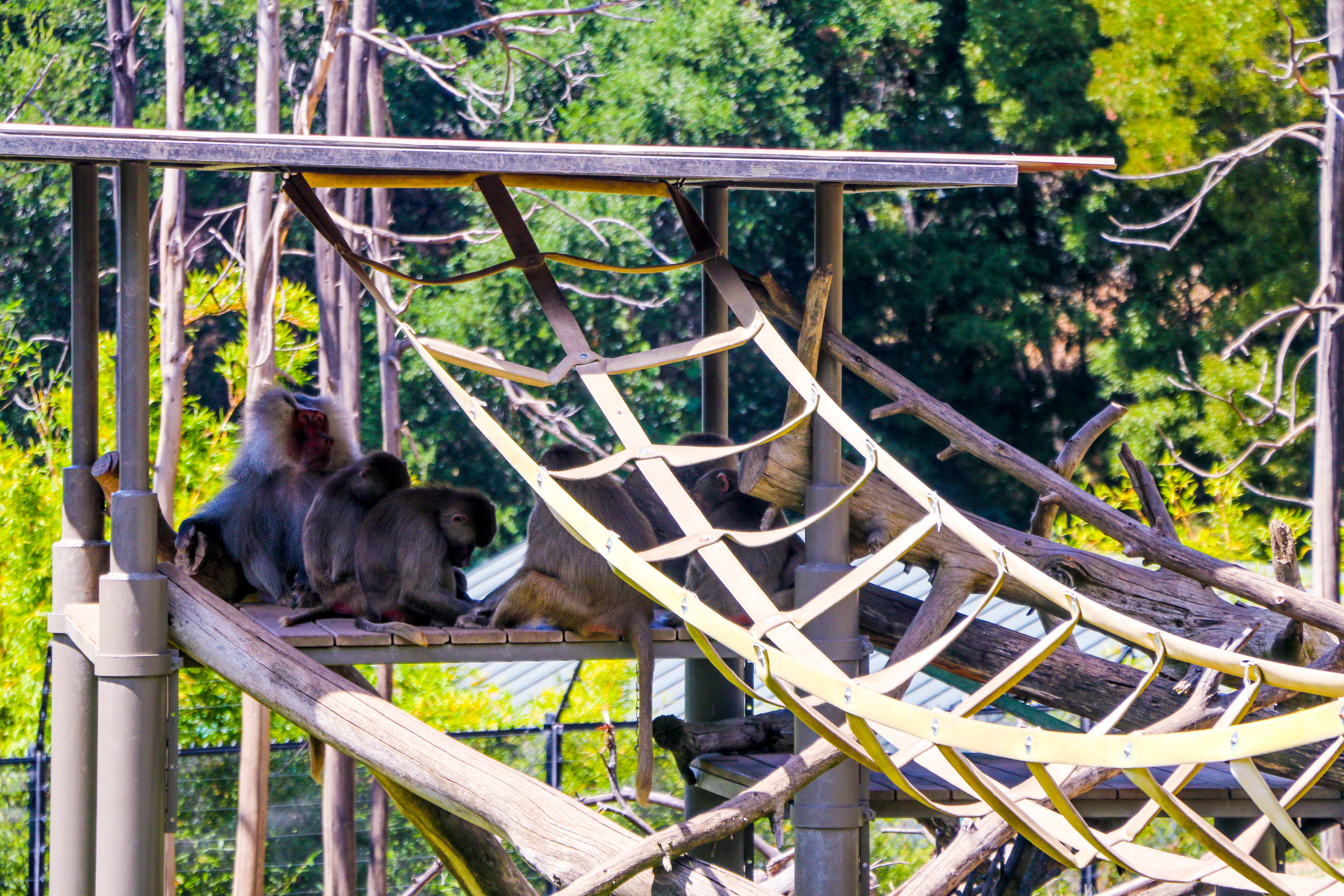
A structure built for baboons at the Oakland Zoo

Structural enrichment is when objects are added to an enclosure to mimic an animal's natural habitat. These objects can be switched out occasionally or kept permanently. The environment of captive animals should be altered frequently, since most natural ecosystems are dynamic, and will present new objects over time and through exploration. Research into what constitutes the most beneficial and appropriate forms of enrichment must be used when considering the provision of enrichment options, especially for species where natural-like settings may be difficult to achieve. The animal should never become too familiar with their environment because that can cause boredom, inadequate stimulation or stereotypical behavior. Examples of this include swings or climbing structures. Stones have also been shown to encourage exploratory behavior in Japanese macaques. Interaction with the stones exhibited behaviors such as gathering, rolling in hands, rubbing, and carrying.

Other common forms include cardboard, forage, and even the texture of the food (i.e. hard, smooth, cold, warm).

=== Olfactory enrichment ===
Olfactory enrichment can stimulate naturalistic behavior, enhance exploration, and reduce inactive behaviors. Olfactory enrichment can be utilized by itself, paired with novel toys, or paired with food-based enrichment. This type of enrichment is most commonly used with species that commonly utilize their olfactory senses in the wild. Due to being highly beneficial, it is important for researchers to analyze the long-term effects of certain odors on captive animals. Odors can be scattered on a novel toy such as a ball or semi-randomly throughout an enclosure. Various forms of odors can include catnip, odor of conspecific, perfume, feces of a prey species, or spices.

=== Cognitive enrichment ===
Cognitive enrichment is defined as improving animal welfare by providing opportunities for captive animals to use cognitive skills for problem solving and providing limited control over some aspects of its environment. In the wild, animals deal with ecological challenges in order to acquire the resources, such as food and shelter, that they require to survive. These challenges arise from interactions with other animals, or through changes to their environment that require the individuals to exercise their cognitive ability and to improve their behavioral strategies. Therefore, these challenges act as an important problem-solving element in the animals' day-to-day lives, and in-turn, increases their overall fitness. The animal anticipates positive benefits from a challenging situation which can directly affect its emotional processes. Cognitive enrichment should be provided in addition to a diverse environment that is already structurally and socially enriched; it goes beyond the basic needs of the animals.

=== Social enrichment ===
Social enrichment can either involve housing a group of conspecifics or animals of different species that would naturally encounter each other in the wild. Social animals in particular (e.g. most primates, lions, flamingos, etc.), benefit from social enrichment because it has the positive effect of creating confidence in the group. Social enrichment can encourage social behaviors that are seen in the wild, including feeding, foraging, defense, territoriality, reproduction, and courtship.

=== Human-interaction enrichment ===
The most common form of human-interaction enrichment is training. The human and animal interaction during training builds trust, and increases the animal's cooperation during clinical and research procedures. In addition, training sessions have been shown to benefit the welfare of both individually housed animals and communally housed animals by providing cognitive stimulation, increasing social play, decreasing inactivity, and mitigating social aggression during feeding.

== Assessing the success ==
A range of methods can be used to assess which environmental enrichment should be provided. These are based on the premises that captive animals should perform behaviors in a similar way to those in the ethogram of their ancestral species, animals should be allowed to perform the activities or interactions they prefer, i.e. preference test studies, and animals should be allowed to perform those activities for which they are highly motivated, i.e. motivation studies.

Environmental enrichment is a way to ensure that an animals natural and instinctual behaviors are kept and able to be passed and taught from one generation to the next. Enrichment techniques that encourage species-specific behaviors, like those that are discovered in the wild, have been studied and found to help the process of reintroduction of endangered species into their natural habitats, as well as helping to create offspring with natural traits and behaviors.

The main way the success of environmental enrichment can be measured is by recognizing the behavioral changes that occur from the techniques used to shape desired behaviors of the animal compared to the behaviors of those found in the wild. Success can also be assessed quantitatively by a range of behavioral and physiological indicators of animal welfare. In addition to those listed above, behavioral indicators include the occurrence of abnormal behaviours (e.g. stereotypies), cognitive bias studies, and the effects of frustration. Physiological indicators include heart rate, corticosteroids, immune function, neurobiology, eggshell quality and thermography.

It is difficult for zookeepers to measure the effectiveness of enrichment in terms of stress, due to the fact that animals housed within zoos are oftentimes on display and presented with abnormal conditions. This can cause uneasiness and affect the animal's visible behaviour, regardless of enrichment quality. Measuring enrichment in terms of reproduction is more reliable, as offspring numbers and fertility can be recorded. By making the necessary environmental changes and providing mental stimulation, animals in captivity have been seen to reproduce at a more similar rate to their wild ancestors in comparison to those provided with less behavioral and environmental enrichment.

== Issues and concerns ==
=== Habituation ===
Although environmental enrichment can provide sensory and social stimulations, it can also have limited efficacy if not changed frequently. Animals can become habituated to environmental enrichments, showing positive behaviors at onset of exposure and progressively declining with time. Environmental enrichments are effective primarily because it offers novelty stimuli, making the animal's daily routines less predictable, as would be in the wild. Therefore, maintaining novelty is important for the efficacy of the enrichment. Frequently changing the type of environmental enrichment will help prevent habituation.

=== Training ===
Usage of more highly advanced enrichment devices, such as computerized devices, requires training. This can lead to issues as training often consists of food as a reward. While food encourages the animal to participate with the device, the animal could associate the device with food. As a result, the interaction with the enrichment would bring about behaviors that are associated with training instead of the desired playful and voluntary behaviors.

=== Time and resources ===
The process of producing and providing environmental enrichment usually require a large allocation of time and resources. In a survey, "time taken by animal care staff to complete other tasks" was the most significant factor influencing environmental enrichment provisions and scheduling. Therefore, it is important to develop appropriate environmental enrichment programs that can be effectively carried out with the size of staff and time available.

== See also ==
- Socialization
