= UFAW Handbook =

The UFAW Handbook on the Care and Management of Laboratory Animals
- Second edition
- Subject: Animal testing
- Publication date: 1948
- Publication place: United Kingdom
- Pages: 848
- ISBN: 978-1-4051-7523-4

The UFAW Handbook is a manual about care of animals used in animal testing. It is presented by the Universities Federation for Animal Welfare.

== Reviews ==
Editions of the text have been reviewed in 1948, 1968, 1978, and more.
