= Michael C. Appleby =

British ethologist

Michael Calvert Appleby OBE is a British ethologist and animal welfare scientist, especially for farm animals. He obtained a BSc in Zoology at the University of Bristol and a PhD in Animal Behaviour at King's College, Cambridge. He then spent 20 years at the Poultry Research Centre in Scotland and the University of Edinburgh researching behaviour, husbandry, and welfare of farm animals. He worked for World Animal Protection (previously WSPA) from 2005 to 2016, and is now retired.

His early work on stocking densities in poultry and the tethering of pregnant sows contributed to the body of evidence that led, eventually, to major changes in animal welfare and the way these animals are kept. Appleby helped design the Edinburgh Modified Cage, which is a furnished cage for hens, replacing battery cages to improve animal welfare.

He was appointed Officer of the Order of the British Empire (OBE) in the 2017 Birthday Honours for services to animal welfare.

== Career ==
Previous positions:

- Senior Lecturer in Applied Animal Behavior, University of Edinburgh
- Vice President, head of Farm Animals and Sustainable Agriculture, Humane Society of the United States (2001–2005)
- Chief Scientific Advisor and Welfare Policy Adviser for World Animal Protection

Current positions:

- Visiting professor in Animal Welfare, Scottish Agricultural College
- Member of the Farm Animal Welfare Council
- Member of the Scientific Committee of Humane Farm Animal Care
- Member of the Animal Compassionate Committee of Whole Foods Market in the US
- Procedural Officer of the International Society for Applied Ethology

== Publications ==
- Appleby, Michael C. (1991) Applied animal behaviour: past, present, and future Universities Federation for Animal Welfare. ISBN 0-900767-74-X. Retrieved 12 February 2011
- Appleby, Michael C., Barry O. Hughes, H. Arnold Elson (1992) Poultry Production Systems: Behaviour, Management and Welfare CAB International. ISBN 0-85198-797-4. Retrieved 3 May 2009
- Appleby, Michael C. (1992). What Should We Do about Animal Welfare? Blackwell Science. ISBN 0-632-05066-7. Retrieved 3 May 2009
  - Michael Appleby was awarded the Universities Federation of Animal Welfare (UFAW) Hulme Fellowship to write this book
- Appleby, Michael, Alistair B. Lawrence, Barry O. Hughes (1996) Behaviour and Welfare of Extensively Farmed Animals Elsevier Science. Retrieved 3 May 2009
- Appleby, Michael C., Barry O. Hughes (1997). Animal Welfare CAB International. ISBN 0-85199-180-7. Retrieved 3 May 2009
- Appleby, Michael C., Joy A. Mench, Barry O. Hughes (2004). Poultry Behaviour and Welfare CAB International. ISBN 0-85199-667-1. Retrieved 3 May 2009
- Appleby, Michael C., V. Cussen, L. Lambert, J. Turner (2008) Long Distance Transport and Welfare of Farm Animals CAB International. ISBN 1-84593-403-2. Retrieved 3 May 2009
- Appleby, Michael C. (2008). Eating Our Future: The environmental impact of industrial animal agriculture WSPA. Retrieved 20 December 2012
