= Universities Federation for Animal Welfare =

UK charity

- Founded: 1926
- Purpose: Animal welfare
- Location: Wheathampstead, Hertfordshire, England
- Origins: University of London Animal Welfare Society
- Region served: Worldwide
- Product: Education
- Key people: C. W. Hume (founder), Huw Golledge (Chief Executive Officer and Scientific Director)
- Website: www.ufaw.org.uk

The Universities Federation for Animal Welfare (UFAW) is an animal welfare science society. It is a UK-registered scientific and educational charity.

UFAW works to improve animals' lives by promoting and supporting developments in the science and technology that underpin advances in animal welfare. It organises symposia, conferences and meetings, and publishes books, videos, technical reports and the quarterly peer-reviewed scientific journal Animal Welfare. Its work has primarily been funded by donations, subscriptions and legacies.

== Research and education grants and awards ==
UFAW has supported a wide range of project types, through the following:

- Hume Animal Welfare Research Fellowships
- Research Training Scholarships
- Animal Welfare Student Scholarships
- Small Project and Travel Awards
- Research and Project Awards
- UFAW 3Rs Liaison Group Research Studentships

== History ==
In 1926, the University of London Animal Welfare Society (ULAWS) was founded by Major Charles Hume. As its support base amongst academic institutions grew and as more institutions and people learned of and championed the scientific approach to animal problems that ULAWS stood for, the name of the society was changed, in 1938, to the Universities Federation for Animal Welfare (UFAW). UFAW's aims were:

- To enlist the influence of university men and women on behalf of animals, wild and domestic;
- To promote, by educational and other methods, interest in the welfare of animals in Great Britain and abroad;
- To lessen, by methods appropriate to the special character of a university organisation, the pain and fear inflicted on animals by man;
- To obtain and disseminate accurate information relating to animal welfare;
- To further and promote legislation for the protection of animals.

UFAW advocates the humane control of wild animals and in 1932 held a meeting on humane methods of trapping rabbits which led to their 1934 book publication "Man versus Rabbit" by A. H. B. Kirkman. The book raised awareness about the cruelty of the leg-hold trap and humane alternatives. In 1938 UFAW supported wild rabbit research and in 1946 a mammal survey of Skomer Island to research humane control of rabbits and rats. UFAW continued to campaign against leg traps and in 1954 the Pests Act was passed which led to the phasing out of such traps in the United Kingdom.

Since its foundation, UFAW has initiated many advances in animal welfare including the first handbook aimed at improving the care and management of laboratory animals (now on its 7th edition), the first programme of research on environmental enrichment (in zoo animals) and involvement in the Brambell Committee whose report into the welfare of animals kept under intensive livestock husbandry systems led to the formation of the Farm Animal Welfare Advisory Committee (later Farm Animal Welfare Council – FAWC) and the concept of the Five Freedoms.

Examples of more recent activities include funding of the work, at the University of Bristol, investigating the use of the concept of cognitive bias to assess the subjective emotional state of an animal – pessimistic or optimistic – and hence their welfare. UFAW has also supported work on genetic welfare problems of companion animals and produced a web resource that describes a range of genetic conditions that affect companion animals and which explains their welfare consequences – the impacts on the animals' quality of life.

UFAW established the Garden Bird Health Initiative (GBHi) to develop and publish guidelines about garden birds aimed at maximizing their welfare and conservation. A new strain of avian pox, for example, is an area of developing concern within the UK.

As part of its remit to educate and inform on animal welfare, UFAW has also produced a series of books, in collaboration with Wiley-Blackwell Science, that seek to provide an authoritative source of information on worldwide developments, current thinking and best practice in the field of animal welfare science and technology.

In 1987, the Council Members became also the Trustees of the Humane Slaughter Association (HSA). The HSA and UFAW are financially independent but have worked closely together for many years to advance farm animal welfare. The HSA works to improve farm animal welfare 'beyond the farm gate' – during transport, at markets and at slaughter.

== The Three Rs ==
UFAW originated and supports the principle of the 'Three R's' in the use of animals in scientific procedures.

In 1954 UFAW's founder, Charles Hume, together with other members of UFAW's Council, wished to see laboratory techniques become more humane for the animals concerned and appointed an Oxford zoologist Dr William Russell to undertake a programme of research into this subject. UFAW Research Fellow Dr Russell, along with his laboratory assistant and co-author Rex Burch, published the results of their work in 1959 as The Principles of Humane Experimental Technique (reprinted in 1992). This publication introduced the concept of the 'Three Rs' – of Replacement, Reduction and Refinement – which in due course came to be adopted as the guiding principle for the welfare of research animals worldwide and is now required by regulatory authorities in many countries. The Three Rs are:

- Replacement – the use of non-animal subjects wherever possible, and research into development and validation of new non-animal research and testing models;
- Reduction – where replacement is not currently possible, the minimising of the number of animals used by, for example, better research design, appropriate statistical methods and use of information databases;
- Refinement – improvement of experimental procedures and aspects of housing and husbandry so as to minimise risks to welfare.

A good deal of UFAW's work, including the Hume Animal Welfare Research Fellowship, the Animal Welfare Research Training Scholarship and other research grants, the UFAW 3Rs Liaison Group, and participation in working groups, has been focused in areas directly related to promoting the Three Rs. A special edition of UFAW's Animal Welfare journal devoted to the Three Rs, and including an article by Professor Russell entitled The Three Rs: past, present and future, was published in 2005 to commemorate the 50th anniversary of the project leading to the publication of the book.

== Journals ==
=== Animal Year Book ===
From 1931–1938, UFAW published annually the Animal Year Book, which contained advice on how to take care of wild and domesticated animals. In 1939, it was renamed UFAW Quarterly Journal.

Historical copies of the Animal Year Book are archived online in the Animal Rights and Animal Welfare Pamphlets, 1874–1952 collection held by the Special Collections Research Center at NC State University Libraries.

=== Animal Welfare ===
UFAW publishes Animal Welfare a scientific and technical journal, since 1992. It publishes the results of peer-reviewed scientific research, technical studies and reviews relating to the welfare of kept animals (e.g. on farms, in laboratories, zoos and as companions) and of those in the wild whose welfare is compromised by human activities. Papers on related ethical and legal issues are also considered for publication. Animal Welfare is published by Cambridge University Press on behalf of UFAW.

The journal also reviews books.

== UFAW Handbook ==
Hare coursing: Until the 1970s, there was a dearth of scientific evidence on the welfare impact of hare coursing. The first thorough study was carried out in 1977–1979 by UFAW.

The UFAW Handbook on the Care and Management of Farm Animals was first published in 1971 and in 2013 reached its fourth edition.

The UFAW Handbook on the Care and Management of Laboratory and other Research Animals was first published in 1947 and reached its eight edition in 2010.

== Notable staff ==
- Judy MacArthur Clark

== See also ==
- Animal welfare science
- List of animal welfare groups
- Pain in animals
- Veterinary ethics
