= Stereotypy (non-human) =

Non-pathological pattern of animal behavior which displays very low variability

An elephant exhibiting stereotyped trunk swinging and rocking behaviour

In animal behaviour, stereotypy, stereotypic or stereotyped behaviour has several meanings, leading to ambiguity in the scientific literature. A stereotypy is a term for a group of phenotypic behaviours that are repetitive, morphologically identical, and which appear purposeless, seeming to possess no obvious goal or function. These behaviours have been defined as "abnormal", as they exhibit themselves solely in animals subjected to barren environments, scheduled or restricted feedings, social deprivation and other cases of frustration, but do not arise in "normal" animals in their natural environments. These behaviours may be maladaptive, involving self-injury or reduced reproductive success, and in laboratory animals can confound behavioural research. Stereotypical behaviours are thought to be caused ultimately by artificial environments that do not allow animals to satisfy their normal behavioural needs. Rather than refer to the behaviour as abnormal, it has been suggested that it be described as "behaviour indicative of an abnormal environment".

Stereotyped behaviour can also refer to normal behaviours that show low variation. For example, mammalian chewing cycles or fish capturing prey using suction feeding. Highly stereotyped movements may be due to mechanical constraint (such as the skull of a viper or fish, in which bones are mechanically linked), tight neural control (as in mammalian chewing), or both. The degree of stereotyping may vary markedly between closely related species engaging in the same behaviour.

== Onset and persistence ==
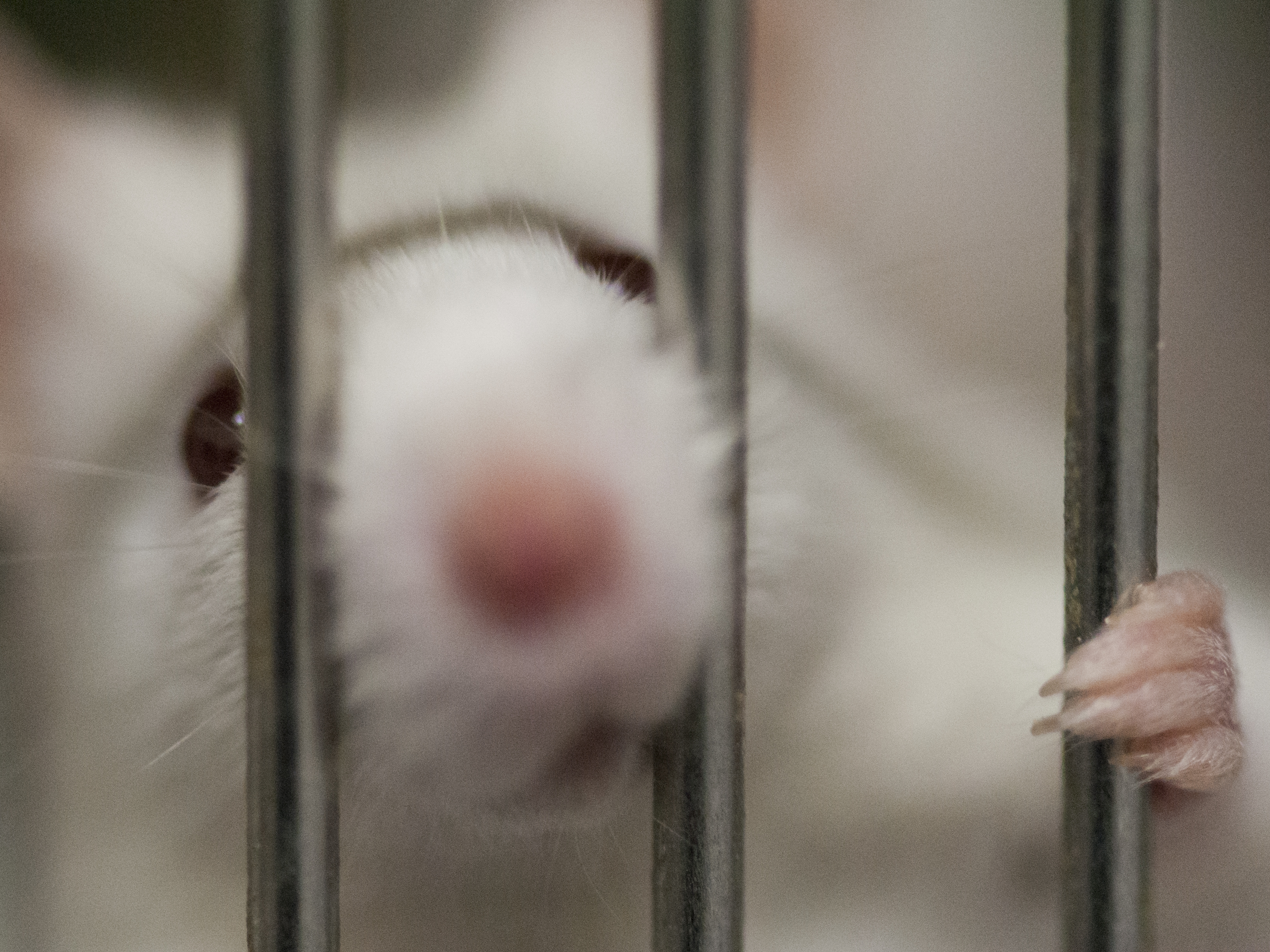
An exploratory sniffing behaviour that may lead to the development of the wire-gnawing stereotypy in a caged mouse

The display of stereotypies is usually increased in an individual over time due to the changing motivation of the stereotypy. The establishment of a stereotypy may be due to a number of factors within a captive environment. One of the factors within a captive environment that may affect the establishment of stereotypies is exploratory behaviours that are directed to the outside of a cage. Research suggests that some common stereotypic behaviours seen in mice, wire-gnawing for example, may originate from such exploratory behaviours. It has been noted that when mice climb on the bars of the cage, they frequently attempt to sniff outside the cage by putting their nose between the bars of the cage. During this process, mice will occasionally bite the bars. Over time, the frequency of biting the bar increases while the frequency of sniffing decreases until the mice are left with only the wire-gnawing stereotypy. Although there is strong evidence to suggest that the development of stereotypies is influenced by exploratory behaviours, the mechanisms behind these exploratory behaviours are still unclear. They may be the result of some attractive stimuli outside of the cage or they may result from a motivation to escape the cage.

The continuance of a stereotypic behaviour can be explained by its impact on the basal ganglia and the establishment of a habit in its expression. Research in humans suggests that damage to the dorsal basal ganglia can make it very difficult for a person to switch between two motor behaviours, thus entraining the continuous performance of the same behaviour. Similar difficulties in switching between motor behaviours have been seen in bank voles which suggests that basal ganglia dysfunction might be a factor in the development of stereotypies in rodents and other animals.

The interruption or cessation of a habit is much more tedious and difficult compared to its initialization. As stereotypies develop, they become more readily elicited, so much so that they are no longer just expressed during the original circumstances and may be expressed in the absence of any apparent stress or conflict. The development of the stereotypy into a habit and the difficulty of interrupting said habit explain why it is expected that the frequency of stereotypies increases with age. There is also some research that suggests that the persistence of stereotypies might be due to behavioural differences between animals with stereotypies and those without. One of the behavioural differences that has been researched is a higher resistance to extinction seen in animals that exhibit stereotypic behaviours. Resistance to extinction occurs when animals are unable to stop a learned response. Research with domesticated dogs has shown that dogs who exhibit common stereotypic behaviours have higher resistance to extinction in a simple experimental task than other dogs. This correlation suggests that stereotypic behaviours in dogs may have been reinforced in some way early in their development and have persisted because these dogs are highly resistant to extinction.

== Examples ==
Video of a mouse showing distinct amphetamine-induced stereotypy reminiscent of nail biting

Stereotypies such as felids pacing in zoo cages can be induced by confinement. Pregnant sows whose feed is restricted bite at their stalls' bars and chew without anything in their mouths. In laboratory rats and mice, grooming is the most common activity other than sleep, and grooming stereotypies have been used to investigate several animal models of anxiety and depression.

Examples of stereotypical behaviours include pacing, rocking, swimming in circles, excessive sleeping, self-mutilation (including feather picking and excessive grooming), and mouthing cage bars.

Stereotypies are seen in many species, including primates, birds, and carnivores. Up to 54% of elephants in zoos display stereotypical behaviors. Stereotypic behaviour is also common in captive giraffes; although they perform a wide range of stereotypies, they predominantly lick inanimate objects, which may be related to limitations on natural foraging and feeding behaviour. Stereotypies are well known in stabled horses, usually developing as a result of being confined, particularly with insufficient exercise. They are colloquially called stable vices. They present a management issue, not only leading to facility damage from chewing, kicking, and repetitive motion, but also lead to health consequences for the animal if not addressed.

Asiatic black bears and Malayan sun bears also exhibit stereotypies when they are caged. Common stereotypies in these species include head throwing and jaw clamping.

Stereotypies can also be seen in dogs. Common stereotypic behaviours in dogs include circling, light fixation and fly snapping.

== Solutions ==
Stereotypical behaviour can sometimes be reduced or eliminated by environmental enrichment, including larger and more stimulating enclosures, training, and introductions of stimuli (such as objects, sounds, or scents) to the animal's environment. The enrichment must be varied to remain effective for any length of time. Housing social animals such as primates with other members of their species is also helpful. However, once the behaviour is established, it is sometimes impossible to eliminate due to alterations in the brain.

== Animal welfare ==
The development and continued expression of stereotypies in captive animals can quickly become an animal welfare concern. Stereotypies are considered one of the most important indicators of long-term animal welfare problems. A prolonged display of stereotypies suggests that the welfare of the animal is in a peril state. The welfare of the mink is considered an important aspect from a management standpoint as it has repercussions on the production of the animal. Inadequate welfare has been linked to poor reproductivity and poor growth rate.

== Animal research ==
Extreme displays of stereotypies can be an animal welfare issue as well as a confound in behavioural research. Since much of the behavioural research done on animals requires the subject to have a certain level of normal behavioural functioning, any stereotypic behaviour exhibited by the subjects could compromise the results. However, expressions of stereotypic behaviour can also present a unique opportunity for researchers. Just as human research into basal ganglia dysfunction provided insight into the development of stereotypies in animals, animal research on stereotypic behaviours may help understand the neuronal mechanisms behind many of the motor stereotypies seen in human clinical populations.

== See also ==
- Abnormal behaviour of birds in captivity
- Animal welfare science – Study of the welfare of animals
- List of abnormal behaviours in animals
