= Animal Welfare (journal) =

- Discipline: Animal welfare
- Language: English
- Edited by: Birte Nielsen and Bas Rodenburg

Publication details
- History: 1992–present
- Publisher: Science for Animal Welfare (England)
- Frequency: Continuous; Gold open access
- Impact factor: 2.4 (2024)

Standard abbreviations
- ISO 4: Anim. Welf.

Indexing
- CODEN: ANWEEF
- ISSN: 0962-7286
- LCCN: sn92015504
- OCLC no.: 796012610

Links
- Journal homepage; Online access

Animal Welfare is a Gold open access, peer-reviewed scientific journal covering studies on the welfare of animals, whether in captivity (e.g. on farms, in laboratories, zoos and as companions) or in the wild. Its scope includes animal welfare science, animal cognition, ethology, behavioural ecology, evolution of behaviour, sociobiology, behavioural physiology, population biology, neurophysiology and abnormal behaviour. It was established in 1992 and is owned by Science for Animal Welfare and published by Cambridge University Press. The editors-in-chief are Birte L. Nielsen (Science for Animal Welfare) and Bas Rodenburg (Utrecht University).

== Abstracting and indexing ==
The journal is abstracted and indexed in:

- Science Citation Index
- Biological Abstracts
- BIOSIS Previews
- CAB Abstracts
- Current Contents/Agriculture, Biology and Environmental Sciences
- Current Primate References
- EMBASE
- Toxicology Abstracts
- Veterinary Update
- The Zoological Record

According to the Journal Citation Reports, the journal has a 2024 impact factor of 2.4.
