= International Society for Applied Ethology =

Behaviour and welfare of confined or domesticated animals

The International Society for Applied Ethology is the leading non-profit professional organization for academics and scientists interested in the behaviour and welfare of confined or domesticated animals, including companion, farm, laboratory and zoo animal species.

The Society was created in Edinburgh in 1966, as the Society for Veterinary Ethology (SVE). It rapidly expanded to cover all applied aspects of Ethology and other Behavioural Sciences, which are relevant to many human-animal interactions, such as farming, wildlife management, the keeping of companion and laboratory animals, and the control of pests. The Society also quickly became increasingly international: it now has a federal, international structure as well as regional representatives around the world. In 1991, on the 25th anniversary of the SVE, the society was renamed the International Society for Applied Ethology (ISAE). At the International Congress that year a paper was presented by Carol Petherick and Ian Duncan entitled "The Society for Veterinary Ethology 1966-1991 the 25th Anniversary Review".

Administration of the Society is the responsibility of a Council. The council also provides technical evidence on topics relating to animal behaviour and animal welfare during the committee stages of government legislation, for example, by discussion with groups such as the UK's Farm Animal Welfare Council. The European Parliament and the Council of Europe also consult council on such matters.

The membership is drawn from all areas of the world and is divided into 11 regions based on geography. ISAE encourages academic activity within the regions, including support of regional meetings, and also holds an annual Congress based, in alternate years, in Europe and elsewhere in the world. The 50th Anniversary Congress was held back in Edinburgh in July 2016 and commemorated with the publication of the book "Animals and Us: 50 Years and More of Applied Ethology." The congress was not held in 2020 due to COVID and was hosted virtually in 2021. In 2022 the congress took place in North Macedonia.

ISAE's official scientific journal is Applied Animal Behaviour Science (AABS), a monthly publication, originally established as Applied Animal Ethology in 1974. AABS continues to be published by Elsevier.

Honorary Fellows of the society include Ruth Harrison, Donald Broom and Michael C. Appleby. Another notable member is Temple Grandin.
