= Consumer demand tests (animals) =

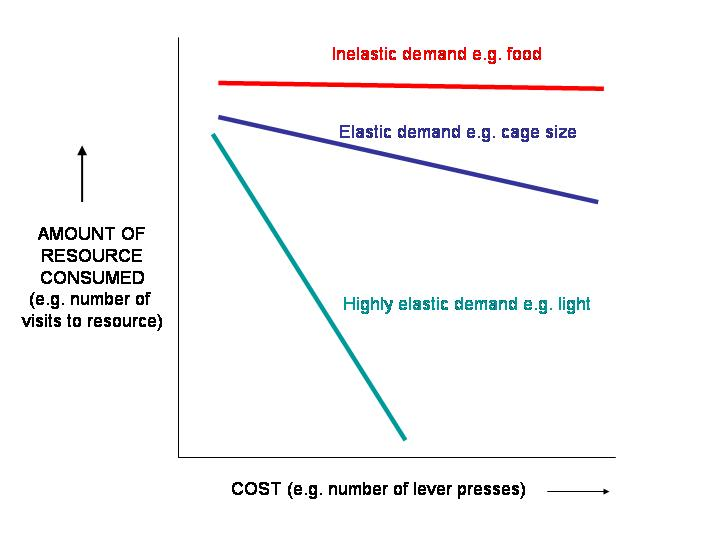
Stylised responses of animals in consumer demand tests

Consumer demand tests for animals are studies designed to measure the relative strength of an animal's motivation to obtain resources such as different food items. Such demand tests quantify the strength of motivation animals have for resources while avoiding anthropomorphism and anthropocentrism.

The test results are analogous to human patterns of purchasing resources with a limited income. For humans, the cost of resources is usually measured in money; in animal studies the cost is usually represented by energy required, time taken or a risk of injury. Costs of resources can be imposed on animals by an operant task (e.g. lever-pressing), a natural aversion (e.g. crossing water), or a homeostatic challenge (e.g. increased body temperature). Humans usually decrease the amount of an item purchased (or consumed) as the cost of that item increases. Similarly, animals tend to consume less of an item as the cost of that item increases (e.g. more lever presses required).

Using consumer demand tests one can empirically determine the strength of motivation animals have for a definite need (e.g. food, water) and also for resources we humans might perceive as a luxury or unnecessary but animals might not (e.g. sand for dustbathing or additional space for caged mice). By comparing the strength of motivation for the resource with that for a definite need, we can measure the importance of a resource as perceived by the animals. Animals will be most highly motivated to interact with resources they absolutely need, highly motivated for resources that they perceive as most improving their welfare, and less motivated for resources they perceive as less important. Furthermore, argument by analogy indicates that as with humans, it is more likely that animals will experience negative affective states (e.g. frustration, anxiety) if they are not provided with the resources for which they show high motivation.

Various other aspects of the animal's behaviour can be measured to aid understanding of motivation for resources, e.g. latency (delay) to approach the point of access, speed of incurring the cost, time with each resource, or the range of activities with each of the resources. These measures can be recorded either by the experimenter or by motion detecting software. Prior to testing, the animals are usually given the opportunity to explore the apparatus and variants to habituate and reduce the effects of novelty.

== Terminology ==
The rate (i.e. regression line) at which the animal decreases its acquisition or consumption of a resource as the cost increases is known as the elasticity of demand. A steep slope of decreasing access indicates a relatively low motivation for a resource, sometimes called 'high elasticity'; a shallow slope indicates relatively high motivation for a resource, sometimes called 'low elasticity', or 'inelastic demand.'

The 'break point' is the cost at which inelastic demand becomes elastic, i.e. the cost at which constant consumption begins to decrease.

== Types of cost ==
=== Operant ===
- Lever pressing
- Weighted door
- Breaking light beam
- Wheel running

=== Natural aversion ===
- Water traverse
- Air blast
- Long distances

=== Homeostatic challenge ===
- Body temperature

== Examples ==
=== Flooring ===
Manser et al. showed that laboratory rats were motivated to lift a door weighing 83% of their body weight to allow them to rest on a solid floor rather than on a grid floor, despite their having been kept on grid floors for over 6 months.

=== Lighting ===
Baldwin showed that when animals were given control of their lighting with the equivalent of an on/off switch, pigs kept lights on for 72% of the time and sheep for 82%. However, when the pigs had to work for the light by keeping their snout within a photo-beam, they only kept the lights on for 0.5% of the time, indicating that light was a weak reinforcement for this species. Savory and Duncan showed that individual hens kept in a background of darkness were prepared to work for 4 hours of light per day.

=== Burrowing substrate ===
Sherwin et al. examined the strength of motivation for burrowing substrate in laboratory mice. Despite an increasing cost of gaining access, the mice continued to work to visit the burrowing substrate. In addition, it was shown that it was the performance of burrowing behaviour that was important to the mice, not simply the functional consequences of the behaviour. King and Welsman showed that when bar pressing gave deermice access to sand, they increased their rate of bar pressing as the number of presses to access the sand was increased.

=== Nest box ===
Duncan and Kite showed that hens were highly motivated to gain access to a nest box, particularly immediately prior to oviposition. The hens would push a weighted door, or walk through water or an air blast to reach a nest box. Duncan and Kite suggested the strength of this motivation was equivalent to that of the strength of motivation to feed after 20 hours deprivation.

=== Social contact ===
Several studies have examined the motivation of animals for social contact either with their offspring or conspecifics.

== See also ==
- Preference tests (animals)
- Consumer theory
