= Donald Broom =

British biologist and academic (born 1942)

- Born: July 14, 1942 (age 84)
- Education: St Catharine's College, Cambridge (BA, PhD, DSc)
- Scientific career
- Fields: Biology
- Workplaces: University of Reading; University of Cambridge

Donald Maurice Broom (born 14 July 1942) is an English biologist and emeritus professor of animal welfare at the University of Cambridge.

== Education and career ==
Broom studied at Whitgift School, and at St Catharine's College, Cambridge, where he gained a B.A. in 1964, and a PhD in 1967. From 1967 to 1986, he was lecturer and then reader at the University of Reading.

Broom was appointed to the first professorship in animal welfare at the University of Cambridge in 1986, and has written widely on sentience in animals, and on the ethics and morality of animal welfare.

During his career in Cambridge, Broom was a fellow of St Catharine's College, Cambridge, and a professor in the veterinary school. On retirement in 2009, he was elected to an emeritus fellowship at St Catharine's college.

== Awards ==
- 2000: Honorary D.Sc: De Montfort University.
- 2005: Honorary Doctorate: Norwegian University of Life Sciences.

== Selected works ==
- Biology of Behaviour (1981)
- Farm Animal Behaviour and Welfare, with Andrew F. Fraser (1990)
- Stress and Animal Welfare with Kenneth G. Johnson (1993)
- The welfare of deer, foxes, mink and hares subjected to hunting by humans: a review (2000) Evidence to the Burns Inquiry
- The Evolution of Morality and Religion (2003)
- Sentience and Animal Welfare (2014).
- Domestic Animal Behaviour and Welfare, with Andrew F. Fraser (2015), 5th edition.
