= Preference test =

Experiment in animal behavior

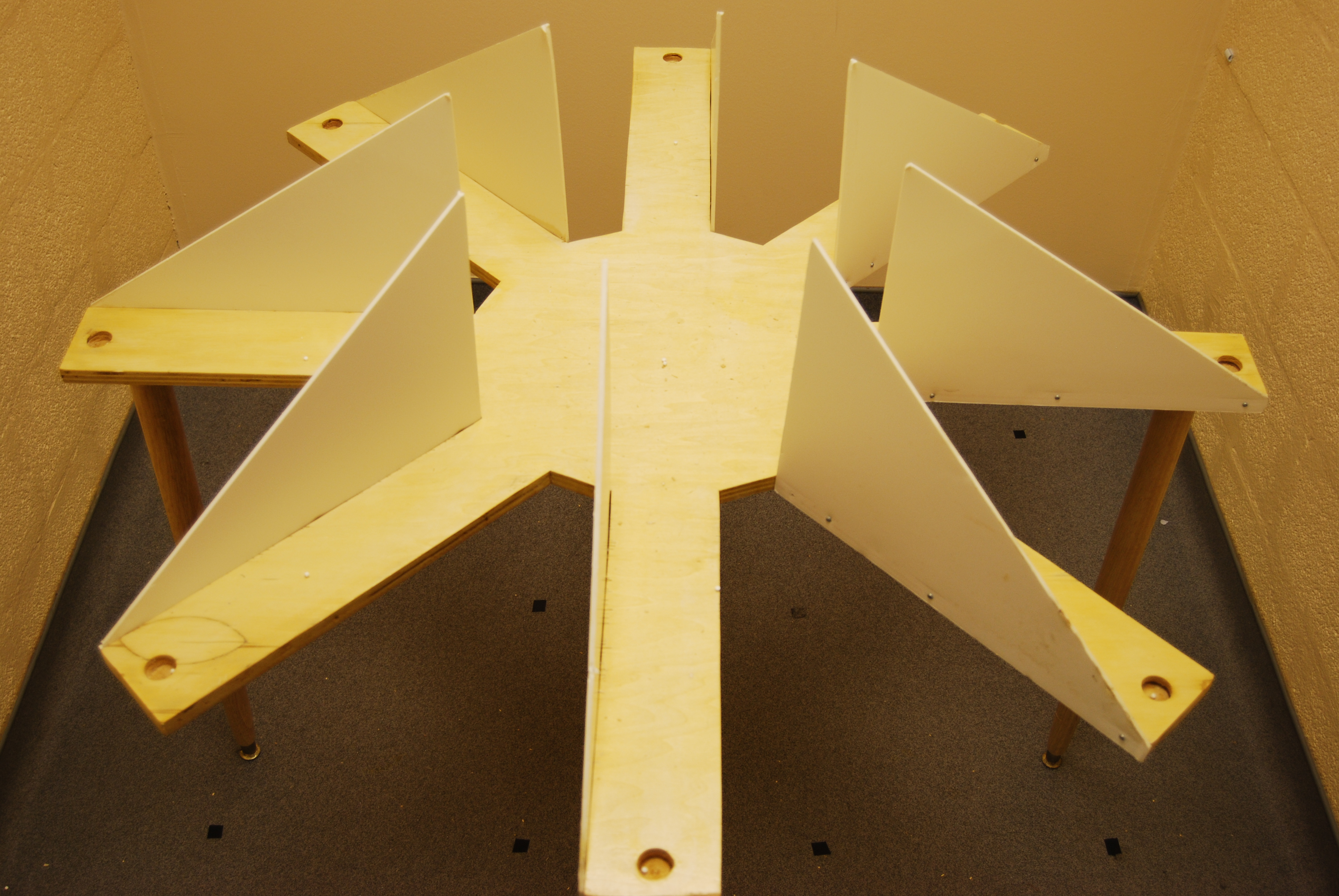
A radial arm maze allowing animals to choose between 8 variants (e.g. food) that would be placed at the end of each arm

A preference test is an experiment in which animals are allowed free access to multiple environments which differ in one or more ways. Various aspects of the animal's behaviour can be measured with respect to the alternative environments, such as latency and frequency of entry, duration of time spent, range of activities observed, or relative consumption of a goal object in the environment. These measures can be recorded either by the experimenter or by motion detecting software. Strength of preference can be inferred by the magnitude of the difference in the response, but see "Advantages and disadvantages" below. Statistical testing is used to determine whether observed differences in such measures support the conclusion that preference or aversion has occurred. Prior to testing, the animals are usually given the opportunity to explore the environments to habituate and reduce the effects of novelty.

Preference tests can be used to test for preferences of only one characteristic of an environment, e.g. cage colour, or multiple characteristics e.g. a choice between hamster wheel, Habitrail tunnels or additional empty space for extended locomotion.

== Types of test ==
=== Two choices ===
The simplest of preference tests offers a choice between two alternatives. This can be done by putting different goal boxes at the ends of the arms of a T-shaped maze, or having a chamber divided into differing halves. A famous example of this simple method is an investigation of the preferences of chickens for different types of wire floor in battery cages. Two types of metal mesh flooring were being used in the 1950s; one type was a large, open mesh using thick wire, the other was a smaller mesh size but the wire was considerably thinner. A prestigious committee, the Brambell Committee, conducting an investigation into farm animal welfare concluded the thicker mesh should be used as this was likely to be more comfortable for the chickens. However, preference tests showed that chickens preferred the thinner wire. Photographs taken from under the cages showed that the thinner mesh offered more points of contact for the feet than the thick mesh, thereby spreading the load on the hens' feet and presumably feeling more comfortable to the birds.

=== Multiple choices ===
The number of choices that can be offered is theoretically limitless for some preference tests, e.g., light intensity, cage size, food types; however, the number is often limited by experimental practicalities, current practice (e.g., animal caging systems) or costs. Furthermore, animals usually investigate all areas of the apparatus in a behaviour called "information gathering", even those with minor preference, so the more choices that are available may dilute the data on the dominant preference(s).

=== Choices with a cost ===
Most preference tests involve no 'cost' for making a choice, so they do not indicate the strength of an animal's motivation or need to obtain the outcome of the choice. For example, if a laboratory mouse is offered three sizes of cage space it may prefer one of them, but this choice does not indicate whether the mouse 'needs' that particular space, or whether it has a relatively slight preference for it. To measure an animal's motivation toward a choice one may perform a "consumer demand test." In this sort of test, the choice involves some "cost" to the animal, such as physical effort (e.g., lever pressing, weighted door).

== Uses ==
Preference tests have been used widely in the study of animal behaviour and motivation, e.g.:

=== Animal housing and husbandry ===
- Colour of cages for laboratory mice
- Desire to self-select stress-reducing drugs in barren cages

=== Sensory capacities ===
- Illumination preferences and sensory capacity of turkeys

=== Animal welfare ===
- Cognitive bias studies

=== Animal communication ===
- Social learning

=== Human pharmacology ===
- The radial arm maze has been used to assess how drugs affect memory performance. It has also been shown to be responsive in distinguishing the cognitive effects of an array of toxicants.

=== Preferences of wild animals ===
- There have been relatively few studies on the preferences of wild animals. A recent study has shown that feral pigeons do not discriminate drinking water according to its content of metabolic wastes, such as uric acid or urea (mimicking faeces- or urine-pollution by birds or mammals respectively).

== Advantages and disadvantages ==
=== Advantages ===
- A major advantage of preference tests is that we can gain objective data about animal motivation from the animal's perspective (largely) without being influenced by attributing human emotions or human senses to the animals.

=== Disadvantages and limitations ===
- Preference tests give an indication only of relative preferences for the offered variants, not the absolute need for any of the variants. This can be overcome by placing costs on gaining access to the variants (see above).
- Animals can only make a choice between the variants offered. These might be limited by our current understanding of the animals' motivations and senses.
- Some variants may offer substitutability of use. For example, offering semi-aquatic mink a bath of water means the water can be used for swimming, drinking and washing, rather than just one activity per se.
- Preference tests sometimes allow access to the variants outside of the testing period ('open economy'), thereby allowing compensatory access outside of the period of observation. More rigorous studies prevent this access ('closed economy').
- It can be difficult to account for minority preferences. For example, consider the duration of human occupation of rooms in a house as an indication of preference. We probably occupy the living room and bedroom for the greatest durations of time, indicating these are the most preferred rooms; however, although we probably spend least time in the bathroom, making it the minority preference, this does not necessarily mean the bathroom is the least preferred room at all times of the day, i.e. minority preference can be important.
- Preferences can vary throughout the day. Well designed studies can account for this complication.
- Animals sometimes behave for proximate considerations rather than ultimate fitness. For example, a dog which has had a painful visit to the vet may prefer not to go to the vet subsequently even though it will ultimately benefit the dog's health.
- 'Inappropriate' responses. This happens particularly when the animals have not evolved appropriate responses to the offered variants. For example, rats will show a preference for saccharin solution compared to unadulterated water. This is because the saccharin has been designed to taste as if it contains nutrients (sugars) although it does not.

== See also ==
- Barnes maze
- Oasis maze
