= Vilwadrinatha Temple =

Hindu temple in Kerala, India

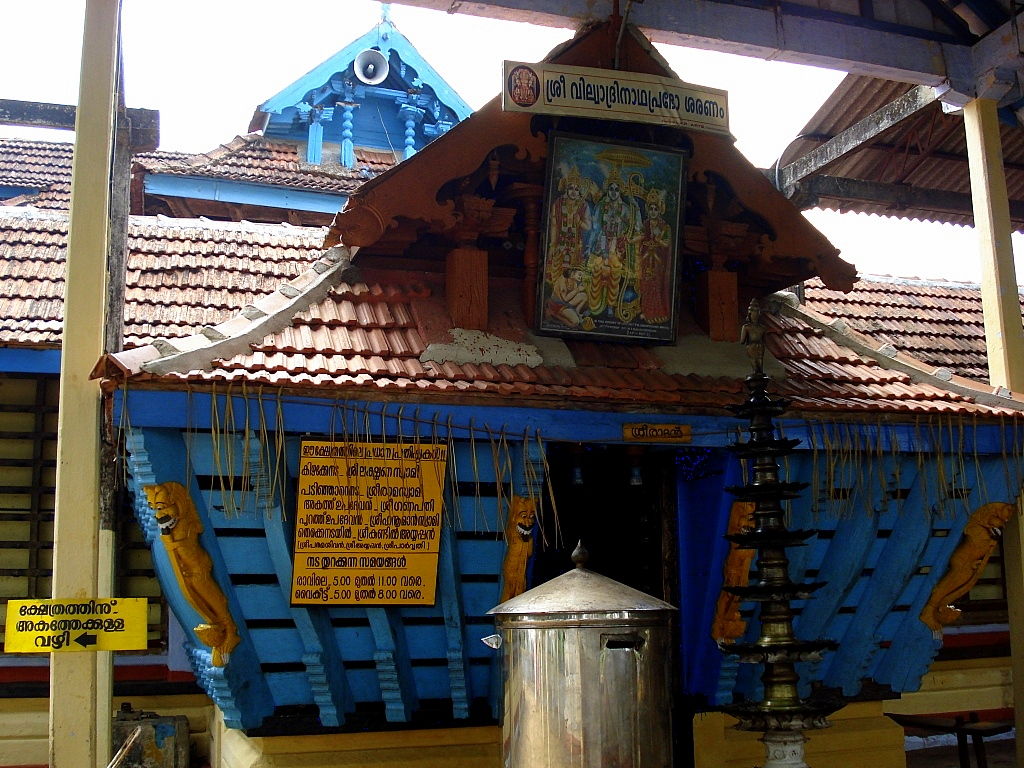

- Vilwadrinatha Temple, Thiruvilwamala, Thrissur, Kerala

Religion
- Affiliation: Hinduism
- District: Thrissur
- Deity: Rama and Lakshmana
- Festivals: Ekadashi, Niramala

Location
- Location: Thiruvilwamala
- State: Kerala
- Country: India
- Coordinates: 10.7406°N 76.4311°E

Architecture
- Type: Traditional Kerala style

Specifications
- Temple: One
- Elevation: 121.92 m (400 ft)

The Vilwadrinatha Temple is a Hindu temple in Thiruvilwamala, a town in Thrissur district, Keralam, India. The principal deities are Rama, the seventh incarnation of the god Vishnu, and his brother, Lakshmana. It figures among the Abhimana Kshetrams in Vaishnavite traditions. This is one of the four major Rama temples in Kerala – the other three are in Thriprayar, Kadavallur, and Thiruvangad. The temple houses an idol of Lakshmana, which is rare in India. Vilwadrinatha Temple is located in the centre of the community of Thiruvilwamala, atop a 100-foot-high hillock. Visible from the temple is Bharathappuzha, the second-largest river in Kerala, which flows past the temple's northern side from around 3 kilometres away.

== History ==
In the early days, Vilwadrinatha Temple was under the control of five Moosad families, (Note: Only three Moosad families still exist today: Kandanath illam, Changanath illam, and Vavath illam. The other two Moosad families no longer exist: Kizhakkillath illam and Kandangath illam.) called 'Parasudayavar' because it is believed that the god Parasurama bestowed their right to control the temple with his axe (parasu in Sanskrit). The eldest of the five administered and the others assisted him. Whoever received this status gave up his relationship with his family and continued to reside in the temple. The Parasudayavar and Samudaya, appointed by the Ooraymas and Karanmas, took up the administration of the temple. The mahayogam ('great conference')—which included the Ooraymas, Karanmas, and other representatives of the temple—used to be held twice a year: once on the Dwadasi before the new moon day in the month of Medam (March–April), and once on the tenth of Karkitakam (June–July). The Parasudayavar was all powerful and was empowered to inflict any punishment (including death sentence) in the temple area. In 392 CE, the king Cheraman Perumal gave the temple land to the Perumpadappuswarupam, who enlarged the area of land under the temple and entrusted the administration to the mahayogam.

Later, the temple came under the control of the Zamorins (Samoothiri) of Kozhikode. (Note: During those days, the Ushapooja (morning pooja) was in the name of Kollengode Valiya Thampuratti, the Uchapooja (noon pooja) was in the name of the King of Kochi, and the Athazhapooja (night pooja) was in the name of the Zamorins. Many litres of palpayasam were offered by the Zamorin.) Later, the King of Kochi took the charge, after continuous revolts with the Zamorins.

The temple has burned thrice: first in 1827, and then twice in 1861. After the second fire, there were plans to renovate the temple, but before any work was done, the temple burned again. The eastern sreekovil was not damaged, and the idol was removed. The western sreekovil was burnt completely, but the idol was undamaged. The current temple was built in 1883 by the King of Kochi.

The temple is now administered by the Cochin Devaswom Board.

== Legend ==
Parashurama, the sixth avatar of the god Vishnu, killed 21 Kshatriya clans with his axe in retaliation for the murder of his father, the sage Jamadagni. (Note: Jamadagni was killed by the sons of the evil king Kartavirya Arjuna, as revenge on Parashurama who assassinated their father.) Repentant of the way he retaliated, he gave all the land he had gained to religious Brahmins, but some opposed Parashurama because he had killed thousands of Kshatriyas. He then retrieved from the Indian Ocean parts of what is now known as Kerala because it was filled with kera (coconut trees). Parasurama built 108 Shiva temples, 108 Durga temples, and five Shasta temples. He then gave the land to the Brahmins and engaged himself in meditation.

Nonetheless, he was still unhappy. One day, while he was meditating, the ghosts of the Kshatriyas killed by Parashurama appeared before him and begged him to grant them redemption. They stated that if they did not receive salvation, they would pose problems for the people. Parashurama then began to pray to Vishnu. While he was praying, he heard a voice informing him that the god Shiva had arrived at Vilwadri (the Sanskrit name for the town of Thiruvilwamala) with his retinue and Parashurama should meet the God. On meeting Parashurama, Shiva gave him an idol of Vishnu and said that he should worship it at Mount Kailash. Parasurama found a good place nearby to put the idol so that all ghosts could have darshan (an opportunity to see a holy person or image of a deity).

At the same time, a sage named Amalaka, the son of the sage Kashyapa, did penance to please Vishnu. When he was doing penance, the devas thought he wanted to take them out of their paradise. They tried to get him to stop his penance by sending heavenly damsels and setting off explosions near him, but he remained undisturbed. When they told Kashyapa about what had happened, he said that his son didn't care about worldly pleasures.

The asuras also arrived in succession to end Amalaka's penance. As soon as Amalaka opened his eyes, flames erupted from them. The asuras were all consumed by fire and transformed into a massive rock known as Rakshasappara.

Amalaka maintained his penance to please the gods. Vishnu appeared before him with his wives, Sri and Bhumi, with the serpent Ananta, as an umbrella. He expressed his desire that the god remain there forever for the sake of humanity. So, Vishnu transformed himself, together with his consorts and Ananta, into a swayambhu idol.

After both idols were consecrated, the power of Vishnu spread throughout the village. Hearing this, the asuras became again furious, and one was sent to destroy the idols. He went to the temple disguised in the form of a holy Brahmin during the daytime. But at night, he changed his form, and ate the cows donated to the temple, throwing their bones northwards. Thus, the place came to be known as moorikkunnu (moori means 'cattle' and kunnu means 'hill' in Malayalam). He also ate some sleeping Brahmins. Since no carnivorous creatures lived nearby, people thought a ghost was eating the cows. Finally, the 11th day (Ekadasi) in the dark fortnight of the month of Kumbham (February–March) arrived. The asura considered that time the most suitable to fulfil his task. At midnight, after all poojas were completed and everybody slept, the asura entered the sreekovil (sanctum) by destroying the pillars. Then, Lord Vishnu appeared from one of the pillars in the form of Narasimha, his fourth avatar, and killed the asura in the same manner he killed Hiranyakashipu. After hearing the thundering sound made by the asura, all the people woke up and rushed to see what happened. After seeing the ferocious form of the Lord, many people fainted. Some people prostrated on the ground and chanted the names of the Lord. They did not have the courage to look upon the ferocious form of the Lord. Sage Amalaka arrived and chanted the names of the Lord. After that, the Lord came back to his original form, and blessed his devotees. To prevent further attacks, some power of Lord Shiva was also disposed in the idol, thus a concept of Lord Shankaranarayana also appeared. Even on special days associated with Lord Shiva—like Mahashivaratri, Pradosha vrata, and Mondays—many people visit Thiruvilwamala Temple.

== Temple structure ==
Vilwadrinatha Temple is situated on the exact centre of Thiruvilwamala village, situated on the top of a hill 100 ft above the sea level. On every side except the east, there is some population. The main gate to the temple is from the west. There are more than 50 steps to reach the temple. Bharathappuzha, one of the major rivers in Kerala, flows 3 km away from the temple on the north side, and as the temple is situated on the top of a hill, the river can be clearly seen from the temple.

=== Grounds ===
On the west and east sides are the remains of two huge seven-storied gopurams. Scenes from various puranas depict on them beautifully. A special kind of lamp was always kept burning on these gopurams. Legend states that priests received dreams to visit Thirunavaya Temple, another famous temple 68 km away on the banks of Bharathappuzha. Upon traveling there, they could see the lamps of the gopurams back at Vilwadrinatha Temple. However, the next day, a huge thunderstorm destroyed both gopurams. This was taken as a sign that God wanted his devotees coming directly to Thiruvilwamala, and not looking from Thirunavaya. Thus, both gopurams were never renovated.

On both sides of the main gate are two idols of Garuda, the mount of Vishnu. Saraswathikund, the place where sage Amalaka is believed to have done his penance, is to the south of the fleet of steps on the west nada. The place got this name because there is a pit here with presence of the goddess Saraswati. There is a huge peepal tree here, and devotees write "Om Harisree Ganapathaye Namah", the famous mantra chanted during the Vidyarambham ceremony, and after that make models of many buildings arranging various stones, bricks, sand, and clay. Ramanchira, a small pond, is situated near the entrance to the west nada. Devaswom rest house and cloak room are situated near them. There is no kodimaram (flagstaff) in this temple. The circumambulation path is carved with stone. There are two aanakkottils on both the western and eastern sides, both recently built.

On the northern side, there is a large pond named 'Bhagavathichira', and there are steps proceeding to it. It is in this pond that the priests and devotees take bath before entering the temple. Previously neglected, the pond was cleaned by devotees and devaswom in 2015. On the northeastern side, there is a small well, once a pond named 'Nairchira', the same size of Bhagavathichira. It is from this well that the water for daily poojas is taken.

=== Interior ===
Inside the nalambalam (inner temple), there are two double-storied square-shaped sreekovils of equal size and importance, situated adjacent but opposite each other. Both contain idols of Vishnu in a standing posture holding a shankha (conch), a chakra (wheel), a gada (club), and a lotus in his four arms. The popular belief is that the idol in the west-facing sreekovil is Rama, and the other one is Lakshmana. As both deities have equal importance, poojas and offerings are done in the same way in both sreekovils. Both deities have separate priests. It is also believed that worshipping the eastern sreekovil first results in salvation, and worshipping western sreekovil first results in material pleasure. There is no namaskara mandapam (prostration hall) in front of both sreekovils. In both sreekovils, the idols are installed in the third room. There are no special decorations on the walls of the sreekovils.

The idol of Rama is a swayambhu (self-born) image, that means no human intervention has ever taken place. This is the only temple in Kerala where Rama has a swayambhu image. It is around 5 ft tall, and made up of a rare kind of stone, called Pathalanjana Sila. The icon is sheltered by Ananta. On each side of the idol, Sri and Bhumi devis are also consecrated. This is the form of Vishnu in which sage Amalaka is believed to have got darshan. As there is a slight presence of Shiva also in this idol, a lamp is always burnt on the back, thus called 'Pinvilakku'.

The idol of Lakshamana is around 3 ft tall and is also made of Pathalanjana Sila. This is one of the rare shrines in India where Lakshamana is constructed. This idol is believed to have been consecrated by Parasurama for the welfare of the ghosts. There are no special decorations on this idol. This sreekovil is considered to be the older one of the two.

There are two vathilmadams (raised platform) on both sides of the western entrance. On the northwestern corner of the nalambalam, there is a storeroom and a dark room. There was a Koothambalam on the southeastern side, where, as the name suggests, the temple art forms like Koothu and Koodiyattam were conducted in olden days. Near the Koothambalam is the Thidappally (temple kitchen), where food offerings are made. On the southwestern side, the god Ganapathi is installed facing east, as seen in almost all Kerala temples. For the blessings of Ganapathi for removing obstacles, Ganapathi Homam is performed here daily in the morning.

Unlike many temples, there are three balikkallus (altar stones)—one is in the west nada and huge in size, while the other two are on the east nada. There is a balikkalppura (entrance passageway into the sanctum) on west nada.

=== Other sites ===
Outside the nalambalam, on the southeastern side, is the shrine of the god Hanuman. Here, Hanuman resides as a temple gatekeeper, and has his own importance. The legend says that after killing the asura who tried to destroy the temple, the remaining asuras came to Vilwadri, and began to attack the temple from afar, as they could not approach it. To prevent their attack, Rama sent his faithful servant Hanuman to Vilwadri, who then resided there permanently to prevent further attacks. The idol of Hanuman is around 5 ft tall and is in a sitting posture. Near this shrine is another storeroom and a stage for various festival entertainment programmes.

On the southern side, there is a shrine dedicated to the god Ayyappa, here called 'Kundil Ayyappan', as the shrine is situated on a pit (kundu in Malayalam) 50 ft below the main temple. Here, Ayyappa resides with his father, Shiva and Shiva's consort, the goddess Parvati, all facing east. It is from this shrine that Vilwadrinatha gets his rice for 'Thripputhari' in the month of Karkkadakam (July–August).

There are shrines dedicated to serpent gods and brahmarakshasas near the Ayyappa shrine. From here, another fleet of steps leads to 'Rakshasappara'. Below it is the Parakkottukavu Temple, a famous temple dedicated to the goddess Bhadrakali, where the festival 'Thalappoli' occurs in the month of Medam (April–May). It is believed that the goddess Sita lived there after getting away from Ayodhya. Once she heard that Rama had reached there, she jumped into the nearby pond, which had kept its 'mouth' open. That pond is now called 'Vaikattichira' (lit. 'the pond which showed its mouth'). Later, a temple appeared there. The temple is constructed facing east towards Vaikattichira.

There was a huge banyan tree on the southwestern side of the temple, with the presence of all deities, especially the god Guruvayoorappan. (Note: Guruvayoorappan is a form of Vishnu (also considered to be Krishna) and is the major deity of Guruvayoor Temple, situated 50 km southwest of Thiruvilwamala.) One of its branches broke on 25 June 2015 after heavy rains and destroyed the southwestern portion of the nalambalam. The tree was later destroyed, and a new banyan planted in its place. There are idols of various Hindu gods below this tree.

Outside the temple complex, on the eastern side, there is a huge peepal tree, despite growing in an area with no soil. That point of the hill is called 'Bhoothanmala', meaning 'the hill of the ghosts'. Nearby is Punarjani Guha, a cave situated 2 km southeast of the main temple. The cave is believed to have been built by Vishwakarma, the divine architect, on request of Brihaspati. Humans can enter this cave only on one day in a year: Guruvayoor Ekadasi, the 11th day (Ekadasi) in the bright fortnight in the month of Vrischikam (November–December). All other days are meant for ghosts.

It is believed that the bottom of the temple is also a cave, and a golden vilwa tree exists there, and thus the place came to be known as 'Thiruvilwamala'. In one story related to this belief, there was a large hole in front of the idol of Rama. Water taken from the hole was given as theertham to devotees. One day, a plantain which was to be offered to the Lord fell into this hole. The priest thought that the water had become impure, and so he tried to take the plantain with a writing nail, but at that time, he heard the sound of breaking rocks, and the water was also dried up.

== Temple Customs ==
=== Daily pooja timings ===
There are five poojas and three seeveli (procession of caparisoned temple elephants) daily in Thiruvilwamala Temple.

The temple opens at 4 AM, in a peaceful and auspicious atmosphere made by blowing conch seven times. The first darshan on the day is called 'Nirmalya Darshanam' (meaning 'darshan with the decorations of the previous day'). After removing those decorations, 'Shankhabhishekam' (a special abhishekam conducted by taking holy water on rightward conch) and other abhishekams are conducted. Then the idols are decorated with new clothes and sandal paste. The first offering of the day is malar (puffed rice), along with a plantain and jaggery. After this, the nada closes for Ushapooja (morning pooja), during which neypayasam (ghee pudding) is offered.

During sunrise, Ethirettupooja and Mahaganapathy Homam are performed. During Ethirettupooja, the sub-deities of the temple (Lords Ganapathi, Hanuman, Shiva, Parvati, and Ayyappa) also get food offerings. After this starts the morning seeveli. The concept of seeveli in Kerala temples is that the Lord watches offering food to his bodyguards, represented by each balikkallu (altar stone). Seeveli consists of three circumambulations (pradakshinams) and finishes after draping food on the big balikkallu. No one should enter nalambalam during seeveli and should circumambulate with the Lord chanting his names.

After seeveli, at 7:30 AM starts 'Navakabhishekam' (abhishekam with the water in nine pots). After this, the idol is again decorated and at 8 AM, when the shadow reaches 12 ft height, Pantheeradi Pooja is conducted, during which vella nivedyam (rice cooked without jaggery) is offered.

At 11 AM, Uchapooja (noon pooja) starts. Palpayasam (milk pudding) is offered to the Lords at this time. After Uchapooja, there is Uchaseeveli too. The temple closes at noon after all rituals.

The temple reopens at 5 PM. Deeparadhana is conducted at the dusk according to the sunset of each day, during which a special act called 'Sandhyavela' is also performed by the devotees, who chant the names of the Lord many times. At 7:30 PM, Athazhapooja (night/dinner pooja) is conducted. Appam, ada, and betel leaves are offered to the Lords at this time. Later, Athazhaseeveli is also conducted. After this seeveli, the final darshan called 'Thrippuka', in which the sreekovil is filled with holy smoke (the name itself has that meaning), is conducted. The temple closes at 9 PM.

Peruvanam Kunnath Kizhakkedath and Padinjaredath Bhattathiris are the Tantris (chief priests) of the east and west sreekovils, respectively. Namboothiris from five illams are Melsanthis (head priests).

=== Darshan ===
Devotees coming from the west nada should not enter directly into the nalambalam. First, devotees can take a bath or wash their feet in the temple ponds, and after reaching the temple, they worship Lord Rama from outside. Later, they proceed to the east nada via north nada. At that time, while reaching northwest, they have to worship Lord Navamukunda. They worship Lord Hanuman before going into the nalambalam. Only with his permission can they enter the nalambalam. Afterwards, they proceed to the Lord Ganapathi shrine. Then only they can worship Lord Rama. After that, they should circumambulate both sreekovils before exiting.

After coming out of the nalambalam, devotees proceed to Lord Ayyappa's shrine. After worshipping the Lord—who resides here with Lord Shiva and his consort (Goddess Parvati), serpent gods, and brahmarakshasas—they worship the peepal plant with the presence of many deities. After that, they turn to the southeast to worship Lord Muruga at Palani, and southwest to worship Lords Vadakkumnathan and Guruvayoorappan. Then, they proceed to Saraswathikundu, and after worshipping Goddess Saraswati, write Harisree beneath the peepal tree standing there. Finally, they arrange stones together as a symbol of three acts: bathing in the holy river Ganga, circumambulating the mountain, and visiting almighty. Then, a darshan is completed.

=== Dress code ===
Men: Traditional mundus are allowed inside the sanctum sanctorum; lungis, shirts, and vests are not permitted. Women: sarees, set mundus, salwar kameez, skirts, and blouses are allowed.

=== Main offerings ===
Palpayasam, udayasthamana pooja, sankhabhishekam, and sahasranamarchana are the main offerings for the main deities. Lord Hanuman's main offering is avil (beaten rice). Mahaganapathy homam is the main offering to Lord Ganapathi. Lord Ayyappa has neerajanam and neyyabhishekam as his main offerings.

== Location ==
The temple is located around 50 km from Thrissur, the district headquarters, and 35 km from Palakkad. There are bus services from both cities. It is 25 km away from Wadakkanchery, the Taluk headquarters. The nearest railway station is at Lakkidi, just on the opposite bank of Bharathappuzha, but the major railway stations nearby are at Ottappalam (14 km), Shoranur (20 km) and Wadakkanchery (25 km). The area is under the control of the Pazhayannur police station, and the Thiruvilwamala revenue village.
