= Vadakke =

Vadakke may refer to:

- Vadakke Kulambu, Indian village
- Vadakke Madhom
- Vadakke Madham Brahmaswam Vedic Research Centre
- Vadakke Manalath Govindan Nair, Indian dancer
