= Punarjani Guha =

Natural tunnel in a rocky cliff in Thiruvilwamala, Kerala, India

Punarjani Guha is a 150-metre natural tunnel in a rocky cliff situated in Thiruvilwamala in Thrissur District of Kerala state in southern India. It is located around 2 km southeast of Vilwadrinatha Temple.

== Ritual ==
The ritual can be practised only on Ekadasi and that also on the eleventh day of every lunar fortnight. The day is called Guruvayur Ekadasi or Vrischika Ekadasi day, in the Malayalam month of Vrishchikam. First the devotee has to take bath in the Papanasini Theertham, a water source near the cliff. It is believed that performing noozhal or crawling through the tunnel from one end to the other will wash away all the sins and thus allow one to attain Moksha, or freedom from rebirth.

== Legend ==
According to legend, Lord Parashurama killed Kshatriya clans at the site of modern-day Vilwadrinatha Temple. Ashamed, Parashurama atoned by providing an idol of Vishnu for the ghosts of those killed. By this, the ghosts got darshan, but they did not get salvation. He went to Brihaspati, the guru of devas, for a remedy. Brihaspati told that as the ghosts achieved many births due to their karma (action), they will not get salvation. So, Lord Parasurama called Vishwakarma, the divine architect. He came with Indra and Brihaspati. As the place for ghosts should not be near the temple, they found a suitable place some distance away. There, Vishwakarma detected the presence of Trimurtis, and Brihaspati began to conduct poojas. At that time, Lord Parasurama constructed a tank named 'Ganapathi Theertham' on the starting. Within the time the construction was completed, he built two more tanks, namely 'Papanasini' and 'Pathala Theertham'. Indra constructed 'Ambutheertham' with his arrows and Airavata, his vehicle, constructed 'Kombutheertham' with his tusks. The ghosts entered through the cave and got salvation.

At the same time, some Brahmins also arrived there, and expressed their wish to crawl. Lord Parasurama told them that humans could also do this, but only on one day: the 11th day (Ekadasi) in the month of Vrischikam, the other days being only for ghosts. The Brahmins arrived on that day, conducted all rituals, crawled through the cave, and got salvation.

There is a story based on Mahabharata related to this cave. Pandavas reached here and crawled through the cave. They came here for performing vedic rituals for their ancestors, and also some relatives who were killed in the Kurukshetra War. They did tarpanam and other rituals, and also consecrated many temples nearby, including Ivor Madom Temple in Pambady (not to be confused with the place with the same name in Kottayam district) which houses Lord Krishna (the word 'ivor/aivar' means 'five persons', and the name came so because it was consecrated by the five Pandavas), and Kothakurissi and Someswaram temples housing Lord Shiva.

For the famous 'noozhal' (crawling) festival, which coincides with Guruvayoor Ekadasi, one has to follow strict rituals. The devotees should fast and remain in the temple on the previous day. At 4 AM on Ekadasi day, the priests open the temple after having a bath in Bhagavathichira, and start some poojas at the entrance of the cave. After the darshan, one has to proceed to Ganapathi Theertham, and to take bath there. Later, the devotees should take bath in Papanasini (not to be confused with the river with the same name at Thirunelli), Pathala Theertham, Ambutheertham, and Kombutheertham in that order, and should enter the cave without drying up. The starting point of the cave is around 6 ft in height, and normal persons can go there without any problem. Later, one has to bend their heads. Some more point further, one has to sit and travel. Again some more point further, the real crawling starts. At some points, there is no air and light, and a person has to seek the help of those in the front and back. Finally, after climbing some steps, a person enters outside, and again goes to Papanasini for bathing. Normal persons cannot do this, as it needs both extreme devotion and willpower. In spite of this huge darkness and location, it is a wonder that there are no ferocious animals and reptiles here, and no one has died ever inside the cave. Only men are allowed to do this.

After the massive fire in 1861, a similar cave also appeared on the west nada. Some people tried to explore this cave, but the attempts were stopped because of unending fleet of steps, and huge darkness. It is also believed that there is a hidden pathway in the temple which leads us to Thirunelli Temple in Wayanad district.
