= Chembai Sangeetholsavam =

Annual Carnatic music festival

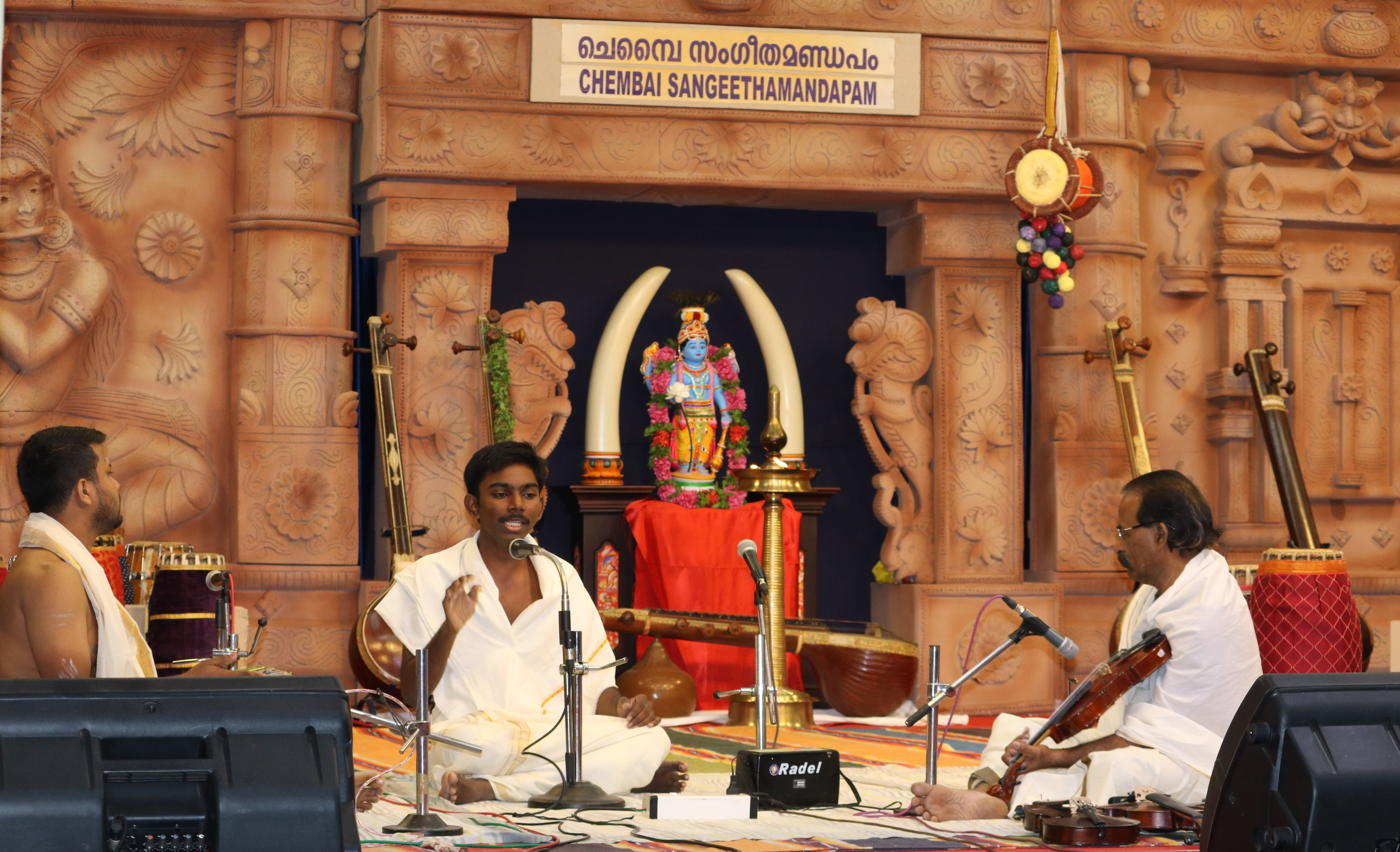
- Dates: 12 - 15 days
- Locations: Guruvayur, Kerala, India
- Years active: 1910 - Present
- Founders: Chembai

Chembai Sangeetholsavam is an annual Carnatic music festival held in Guruvayur by the Guruvayur Devaswom (similar to the Thyagaraja Aradhana at Thiruvaiyaru) in memory of Chembai Vaidyanatha Bhagavatar, a Carnatic classical musician and a devotee of Guruvayurappan.

== History ==
Chembai had conducted the festival in the temple town on his own for about 60 years. He used to invite anyone interested in Carnatic music, from small children to renowned musicians of his time, to perform at the festival. The Guruvayur Devaswom over the festival after his death in 1974, renaming it Chembai Sangeetholsavam in his memory.

== The Festival ==
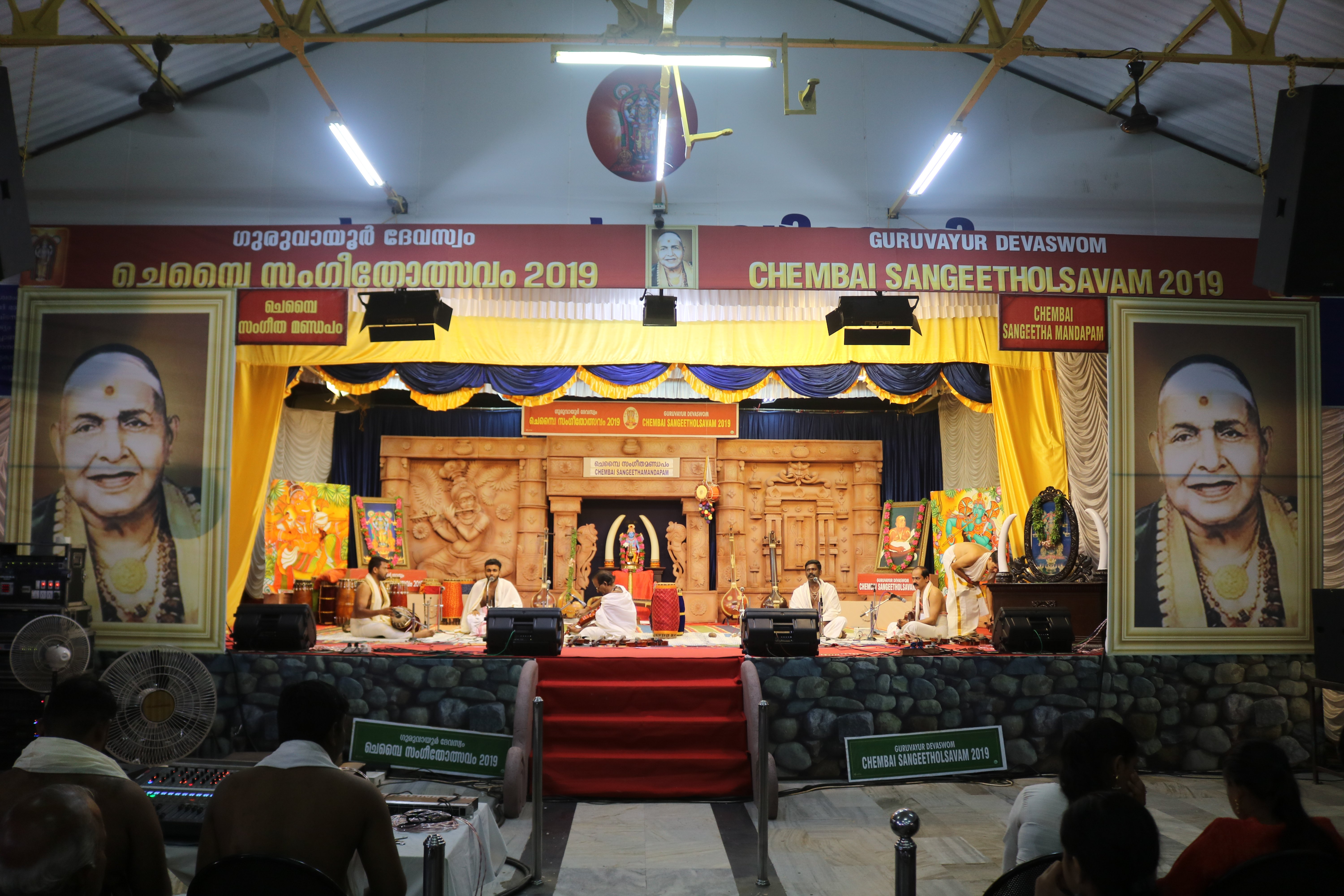
Chembai sangeetholsavam 2019

About 3000 musicians participate every year and it lasts about two weeks culminating on the Guruvayur Ekadasi day, when all the musicians sing five favorite songs of Chembai and also the Pancharatna Kritis of Thyagaraja.

== See also ==
- List of Indian classical music festivals
