= Kadavallur Anyonyam =

Annual Rig Veda debate in Kadavallur, India

Kadavallur Anyonyam is a Rig Veda debate held annually at Kadavallur in Thrissur District, India. In the anyonyam two major Rig Veda schools (known as Vadakke Madhom) based in Thrissur Thirunavaya take part. Over the years, the two Brahmaswam Maths at Thrissur and Thirunavaya developed a healthy and constructive competitive spirit. Kadavalloor Anyonyam is the final examination for the Vedic scholars of these institutions.

== Place and date ==
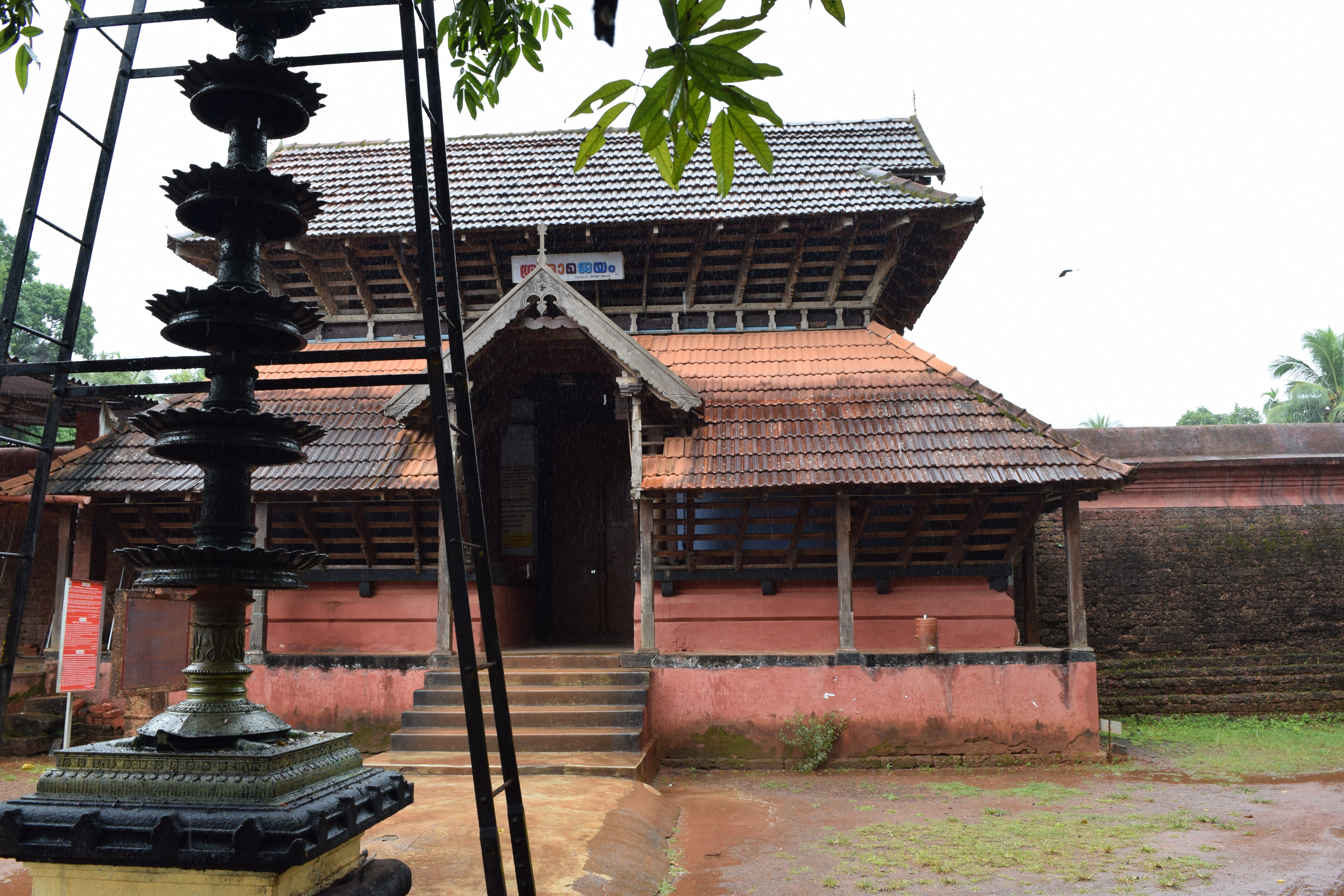
Kadavallur Sri Rama Temple

The Kadavalloor Anyonyam is conducted every year during the first fortnight of the Malayalam month Vrischikam (mid-November) at the Sreeramaswamy Temple at Kadavallur, Thrissur District. Kadavalloor Anyonyam used to be held regularly till 1947. It was revived in 1989 and is being held regularly since then. The ceremony is held for 8 days.
