= Little Flower College =

Women's catholic college

Coordinates: 10.6061°N 76.0372°E

Little Flower Autonomous College, Guruvayur
- Motto: Duc in Altum
- Established: 1 July 1955
- Affiliations: University of Calicut
- Religious affiliation: Roman Catholic
- Location: Guruvayur, Thrissur District, Kerala, India
- Campus: Urban
- Website: littleflowercollege.edu.in

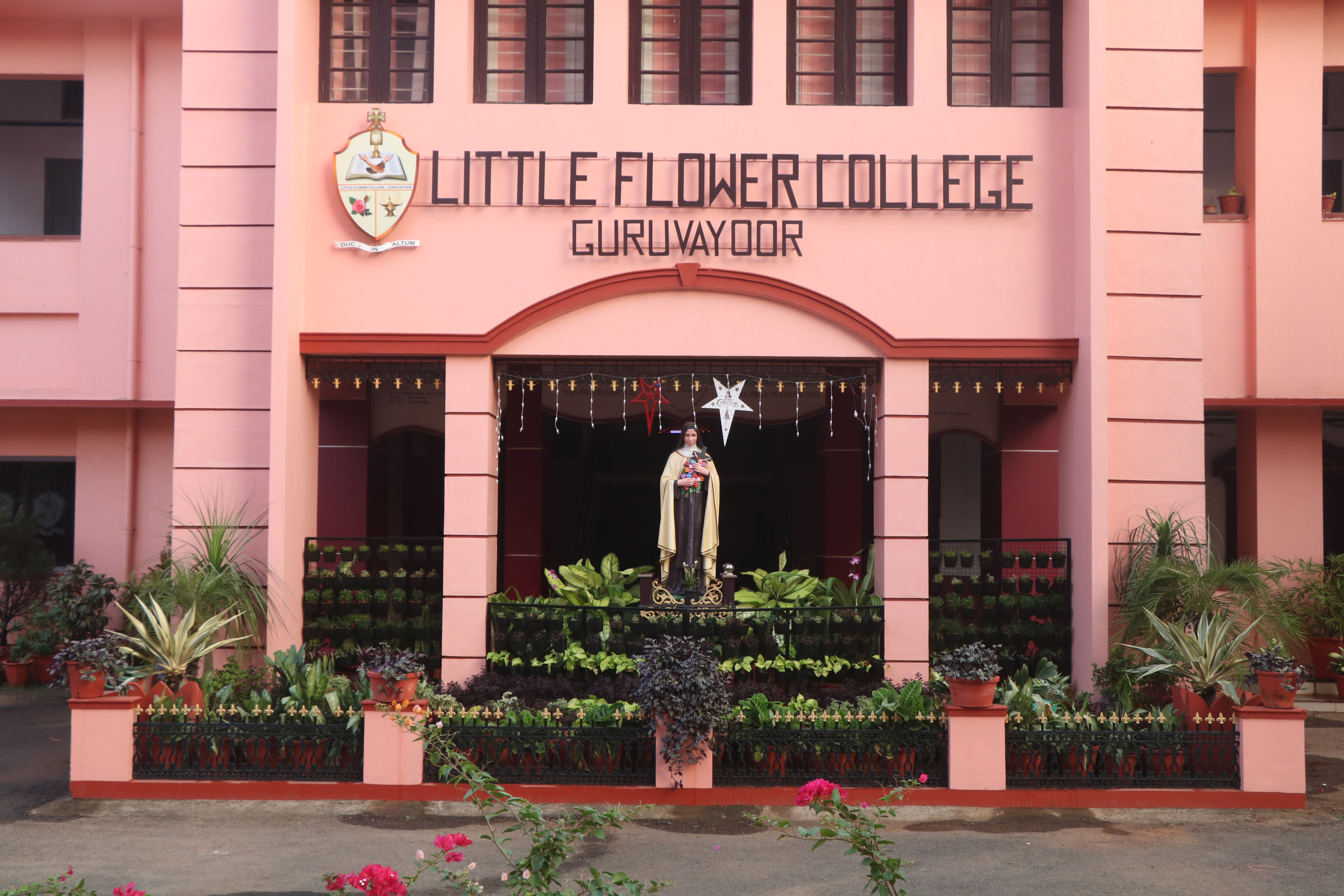
Entrance of Little Flower Autonomous College

Little Flower Autonomous College is a women's Catholic college in Guruvayur, India, and is affiliated with the University of Calicut. The administration of the college falls under the Assisi Province of the Franciscan Congregation. In 2017, the college was ranked 49th in India by the National Institutional Ranking Framework (NIRF).

== History ==
Little Flower College was established on July 1, 1955. The inaugural address was delivered by Reverend Dr. George Alappat, Bishop of Thrissur, and Rev. Sr. Mary Victoria, the first principal. The college was established by the Franciscan Clarist Congregation and is under the religious jurisdiction of the Roman Catholic Archbishop of Thrissur.

Although the college originated from the University of Madras, it was later affiliated with the University of Kerala in 1957, and then with the educational canopy of the University of Calicut in 1968. The college began functioning as a Second Grade College in March 1957. After adding a Bachelor of Science in Mathematics, and a Bachelor of Arts in Economics to its academic offerings, the school was upgraded to a First Grade College.
