= Nehru College of Engineering and Research Centre =

Engineering college in Thrissur district

- Type: Private
- Established: 2002
- Location: Pambadi, Thiruvilwamala, Thrissur District, Kerala, India; 10.7441°N 76.4340°E
- Website: https://ncerc.ac.in/

Nehru College of Engineering and Research Centre (NCERC) is a private engineering college situated in Thiruvilwamala, Thrissur District, Kerala, India. It is approved by the All India Council for Technical Education (AICTE), New Delhi, affiliated to the University of Calicut, and accredited by the National Assessment and Accreditation Council (NAAC). The college holds ISO 9001-2008 certification and is run by the Nehru College of Educational and Charitable Trust, established in 1968 and headquartered in Kuniamuthur, Coimbatore District, Tamil Nadu. The trust collectively operates 12 institutions in Kerala and Tamil Nadu, known as the Nehru Group of Institutions.

It was featured in the news in January 2017, following the death of a student because he was allegedly harassed by the college authorities for purported malpractices during an examination. This incident has sparked a chain reaction in Kerala, where hundreds of students have come out to share the horrific tales of torture and harassment in the state’s self-financed colleges.

== Death of Jishnu Pranoy ==
An 18-year old computer science student named Jishnu Pranoy was found hanging in his hostel bathroom on 6, January 2017 due to harassment by the college management allegedly after he was caught cheating in university semester exam. There were torture marks on Jishnu's body and the college authorities also refused to take him to the hospital. The death of the student caused violent protests with many students coming out and sharing the harassment they are facing in this college. It was reportedly revealed there are torture rooms in the college where students are assaulted. Students are also fined for beards longer than 0.02 millimeter. Students are not allowed to have girlfriends or sit on the same bench with girls in the classroom. Even cutting cakes in the classroom for celebrating birthdays is banned in this college. Kerala state Human Rights Commission has sought a report on this matter.

Many mainstream media didn't mention the name of the college, and instead resorted to using the term 'popular college'. This caused an intense social media rage against the media and college management for trying to cover-up the issue. The name of the college was finally revealed by the Kairali People TV channel. The hashtag #JusticeForJishnu trended in all social media across Kerala. A Facebook campaign page was also started (called Justice for Jishnu ) where students came together to share several posts about alleged that emotional harassment by the college authorities was an everyday affair.

The mystery of Jishnu's unnatural death deepened when the college's statement of 'caught copying' was proved false in all the investigations. The university investigation team assigned by KTU(Kerala Technical University) said they have not received any complaints regarding the copying incident of Jishnu. According to the University rules, the college is required to immediately report any exam malpractice incidents on the same day of the exam.

After inspecting the bench on which Jishnu sat on that fateful exam day, the distance and angle towards the other students, A.D.G.P Sudesh Kumar concluded that there is no chance Jishnu could have copied from that seat in the way the college is claiming. Also, all students have testified saying that Jishnu didn't copy.

Jishnu's postmortem report shows that there were multiple injuries on his nose, face, lips and neck hinting to physical torture. His classmates had alleged that the Vice-principal and PRO of the college had physically assaulted Jishnu after which he committed suicide.

After this incident, students of many other private engineering colleges also started coming out with harassment stories from management. When the protest turned violent, the college management suspended Vice-principal Dr N K Sakthivel, teacher Praveen C P and PRO Sanjith Viswanathan.

Kerala chief minister said many organisations had started colleges with an eye on making profit, and that even liquor barons established colleges and auctioned the job opportunities in those institutions. Chief Minister said the government would inquire into the "corruption and loot" prevalent in the self-financing educational sector. "Ever since self-financed colleges came up, many saw the education sector as a business with a potential for huge profits. Earlier the Christian managements stayed away from this trend, but now majority has become part of this," he said referring to Jishnu's death.

As of January 2019 the Central Bureau of Investigation was still investigating the case. Following a comprehensive CBI investigation, it was found that the student had committed suicide. No evidence was found against P. Krishnadas, Chairman of Nehru Group of Institutions, who was cleared of all earlier accusations by the State Crime Branch.

== Torture rooms ==
The office room of P.R.O(Public Relations Officer) is known as 'idi muri' (torture room) where students are physically assaulted. The college had appointed 'disciplinary officers' to ensure that the rules imposed by authorities are strictly followed. Those who challenge the stringent rules are summoned to this room where they are threatened and beaten up, alumnus and students of the college claimed.

== Masked, male strippers outside woman's hostel ==
Many other students also reported several other controversial incidents, including the regular appearance of men with masks stripping to full nudity behind the woman's hostel. They also reportedly come near the windows and sexually harass the students. This became a serious news when students released the photo of the naked showman and several students reported to media that the management of the college didn't take any action. Instead the management blamed the students saying they must be the ones who is inviting the showman, while the warden said 'this is anyway something you would have to see after you get married, so what is the problem?'.

== Unconventional rules ==
There are penalties for growing beards, failure to wear an ID tag, being late, cutting a cake for celebrations etc. Students who question these policies may be punished by cutting internal marks or not allowing to attend the exams. There is an undeclared ban on girls and boys being together on the campus.

== Chairman's torture allegations ==
While the college was caught up in the Jishnu's death case, another student named Shaheer came out stating that the Chairman of the institute, Mr. Krishnadas, punched, thrashed and threatened him. Shaheer was a second year LLB student of Nehru Academy of Law, Lakkidi(JCET campus). He had written complaints to chief minister and calicut university in October 2016 stating the illegal activities happening in the college. He also had written letter to income tax department stating the illegal fine collections happening in the college.

The university had asked the college for an explanation in this matter by the end of December, while students were in Christmas vacation. When the college reopened on the morning of 3 January 2017 (three days before Jishnu's death), Shaheer was forcefully taken from his college in an autorickshaw to Pambady Nehru college by a person working for the management. Then he was detained and tortured there till the end of the day.

He was then forcefully asked to write a letter saying that he is taking back this complaint and that he don't have any complaint. He was punched and thrashed by Krishnadas in his office. He was also made to write a letter admitting that he was 'caught ragging' although he have never done any such thing. When he refused to sign it, he was beaten up. He ultimately signed it when he came to know that he will not be released unless he sign that paper as he was already detained against his will for over eight hours. He was then forced to write a letter saying that he is being suspended because he was caught 'ragging'.

After he signed the paper, Krishnadas abused him by saying "If you have any shame, then you should keep your head to a train tomorrow and commit suicide". Krishnadas also said "you will not study here anymore". Shaheer has permanently discontinued his education from this college due to these death threats.

== Chairman Krishnadas's Arrests ==
Nehru college chairman P Krishnadas was arrested on 20 March 2017 on charges of assaulting a student named Shaheer at Nehru academy of Law in JCET campus, Lakkidi. Krishnadas, along with Lakkidi College PRO Valsalakumar, Nehru college legal adviser Suchitra, administration manager Sukumaran and PT teacher Govindankutty, were arrested and taken into custody by a team led by Thrissur Rural SP.

According to the complaint filed by Shaheer, Krishnadas had beaten him up for almost eight hours and threatened to trap him in a fake ragging case if he revealed the torture to anyone. This incident had taken place three days before the death of Jishnu Pranoy. The Kerala High Court had already granted anticipatory bail to Krishadas in the suicide death of Jishnu.

The Judicial first class magistrate of Wadakkanchery rejected the bail plea of Krishnadas and four others involved. Krishnadas was then shifted to Viyyur central jail. The magistrate upheld the argument of the prosecutor T R Manoj Kumar that granting bail to them will affect the investigation of the case as they were influential people and will be able to influence the witnesses.

Krishnadas was again arrested on 4 April for questioning in the Jishnu Pranoy death case, but was left off in the evening as he had anticipatory bail. Following a comprehensive CBI investigation, P Krishnadas, Chairman of Nehru Group of Institutions, was found to be clear of the accusations, and was acquitted from the case.

== Police Report on Jishnu Death Case ==
The police report submitted to Wadakkanchery court on 13 February 2017 by the Special Investigation Team(SIT), under the leadership of Assistant Superintendent of Police (ASP) Kiran Narayanan accused five people in the death case of Jishnu Pranoy.

It lists P Krishna Das, chairman and managing trustee of the Nehru College of Educational and Charitable Trust as the first accused. The vice principal N.K Sakthivel, assistant professor C.P Praveen, P.R.O Sanjith Viswanathan, and college staff examination cell member Dipin, are the other four accused.

The investigation reports says that the accused had prior enmity against Jishnu for having participated in the student's agitation and for posting material against the illegal activities of the college in the social media, as part of the agitation. The chairman Krishnadas then conspired with the other accused to implicate Jishnu in a copying case and had fabricated evidence to support the charges. The report says that the chairman then used vice principal Sakthivel and invigilator C.P Praveen to carry out this crime.

The accused C.P praveen came as the invigilator for both the exams written by Jishnu. About thirty minutes before the end of second exam conducted on 6 January, he 'caught' Jishnu of copying as part of the conspiracy plan. The student he accused Jishnu of copying from was also named Jishnu. The exam cell staff Dipin also helped Praveen to implement this plan. It is also alleged that Praveen may have got confused on which Jishnu was the target and hence he caught both of them for copying.

Both students were then taken to the Principal's office. The principal who knew about the conspiracy refused to fabricate them for the crime they didn't do. He asked the vice principal and invigilator to let the students go without any consequences. However, Vice principal only let the other Jishnu leave. He then took his target, Jishnu Pranoy to his cabin and crossed out his examination papers. The police report says that he then physically and mentally tortured Jishnu for next two hours. The vice principal is also charged with the crime of physical assault. Then, Jishnu was told that he has been debarred from writing any exams for the next three years. Later, Jishnu was found hanging in the bathroom of boy's hostel. Police report also states there is no evidence of Jishnu copying.

Police report further states that the accused chairman Krishna das and P.R.O Sanjith then destroyed evidence by damaging the hard disk which stored the footage of CCTV cameras in the college. They also cleaned the blood stains and other potential evidence. They were also accused of making false documents with fake signature of Jishnu.

The charges against the accused have been framed under eight sections of the IPC including Section 306 (abetment of suicide), Section 323 (physical assault and causing injury), Section 120 (B) (criminal conspiracy), Section 468 (forgery for the purpose of cheating) and Section 201(destruction of evidence). All the sections are non bailable.

When the arrest was imminent, all five accused went into hiding and has been absconding from Police ever since. Police had carried out searches in Kerala, Tamil Nadu and Karnataka. The P.K Das hospital owned by the same chairman was also searched.

Few days later, the police forensic team found blood stains in Vice principal's cabinet, P.R.O's room and the bathroom where Jishnu was found hanging. Police is also trying to recover the CCTV footage.

Police have also made look-out notices in search for the five absconding accused and have alerted all airports.

== Land acquisition and illegal use ==
Nehru college illegally acquired and used the 'forest land' for their own private construction activities. Following this, Thrissur DFO (Deputy Conservator of Forests) had visited the site. DFO said that the forest department will recover this illegally acquired land.
