= Guruvayur =

Temple town in Kerala

- Municipality
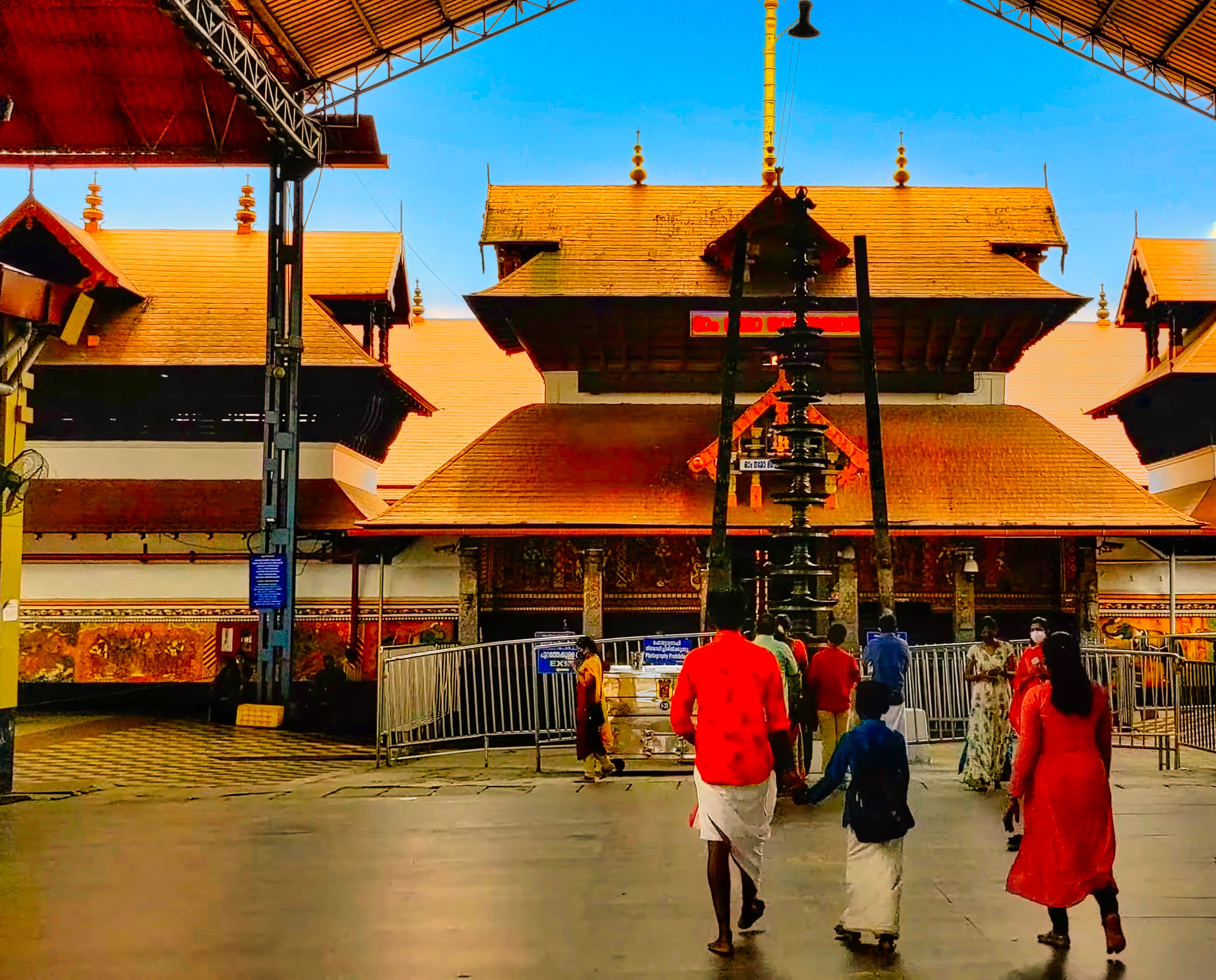
- Guruvayur temple entrance
- Nickname: Dvaraka of the South
- Guruvayur, Kerala
- Coordinates: 10°35′40.6″N 76°02′12.8″E
- Country: India
- State: Kerala
- District: Thrissur

Government
  - Body: Guruvayur Municipality

Area
  - Total: 29.66 km^{2} (11.45 sq mi)
- Elevation: 24.86 m (81.6 ft)

Population (2011)
  - Total: 67,006
  - Density: 2,259/km^{2} (5,851/sq mi)

Languages
  - Official: Malayalam
- Time zone: UTC+5:30 (IST)
- PIN: 680101
- Telephone code: +91487xxxxxxx
- Vehicle registration: KL-46
- Climate: Am/Aw (Köppen)
- Avg. summer temperature: 35 °C (95 °F)
- Avg. winter temperature: 20 °C (68 °F)

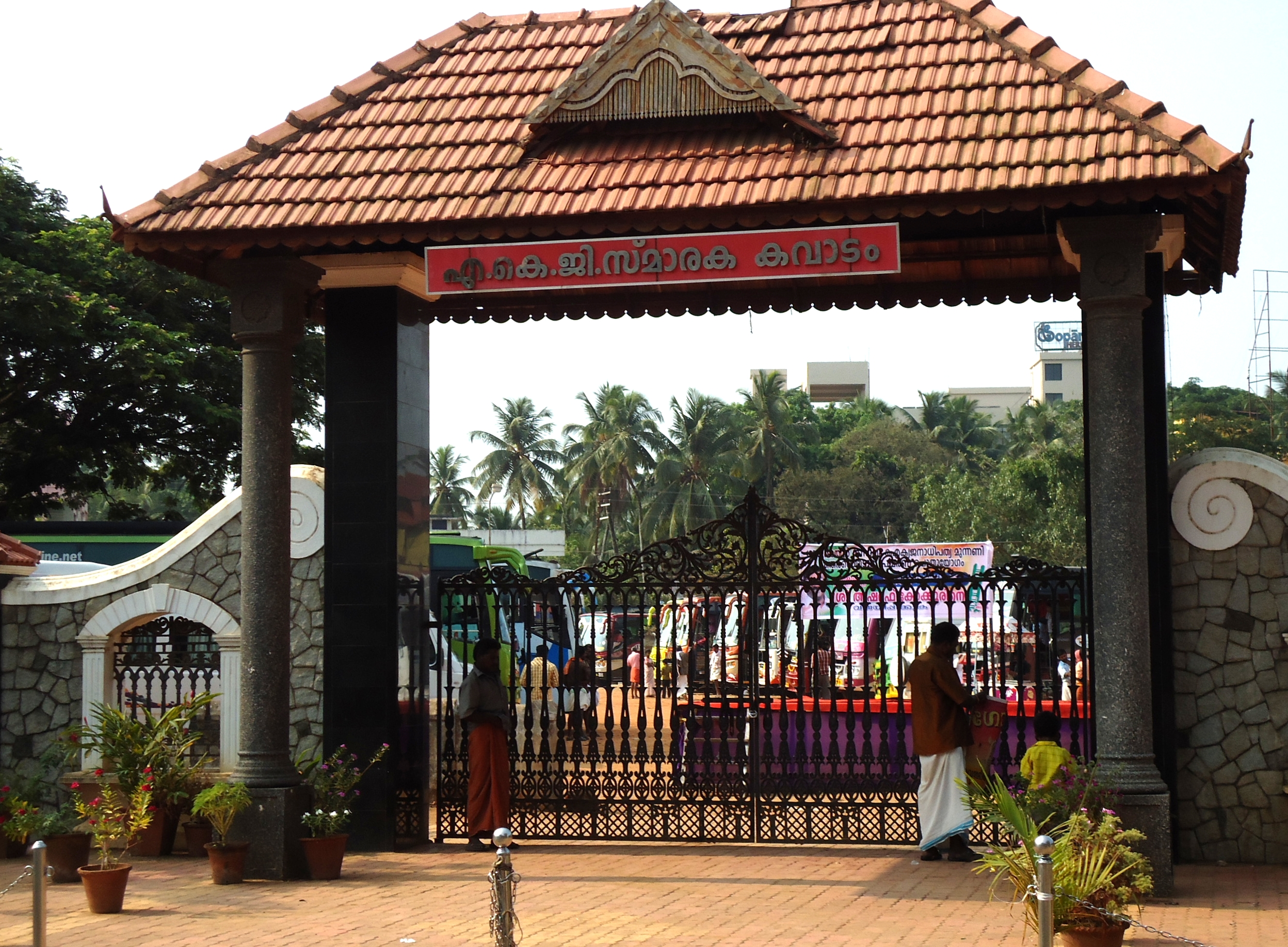
AKG Gate in Guruvayur

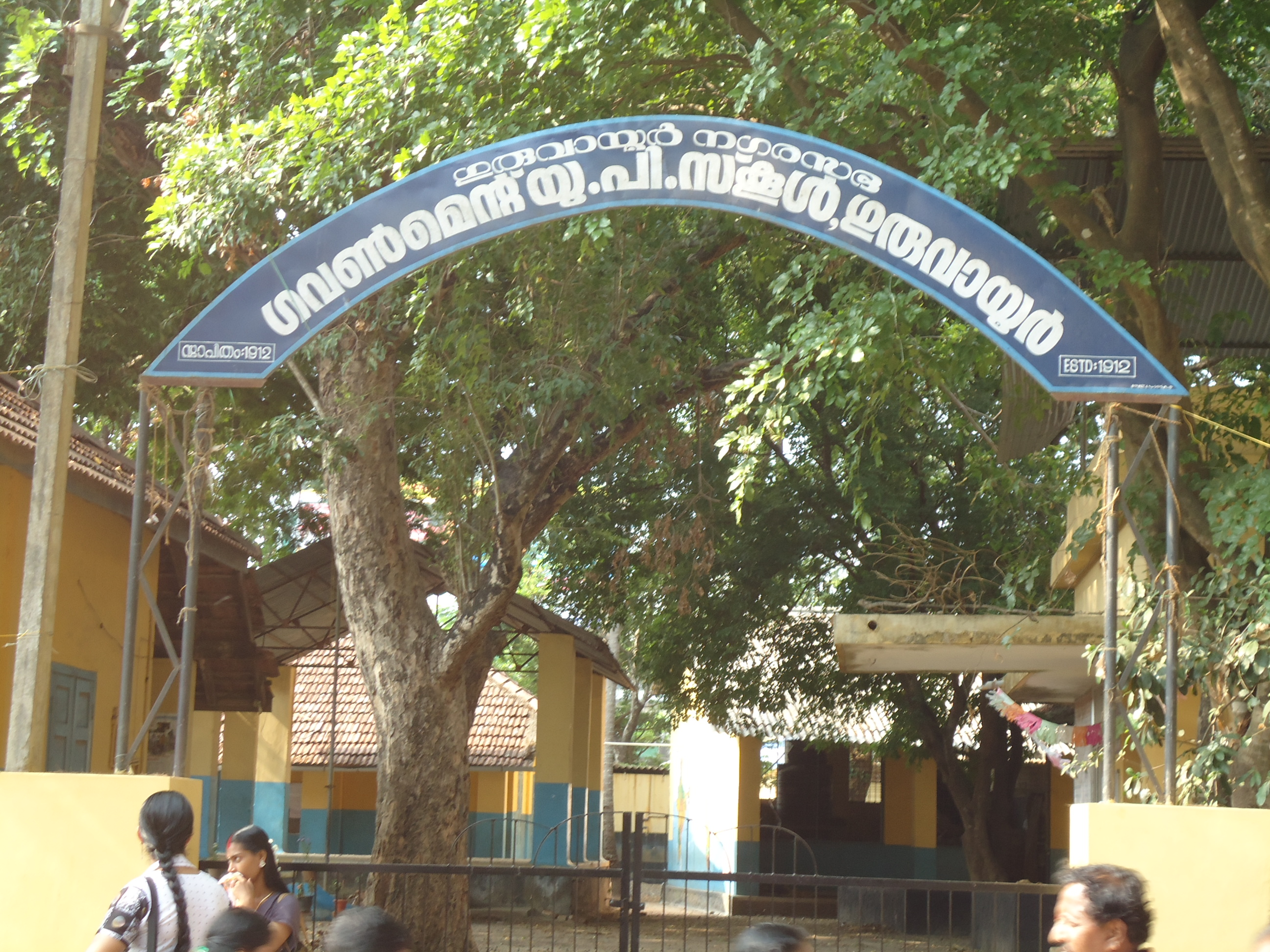
Government School

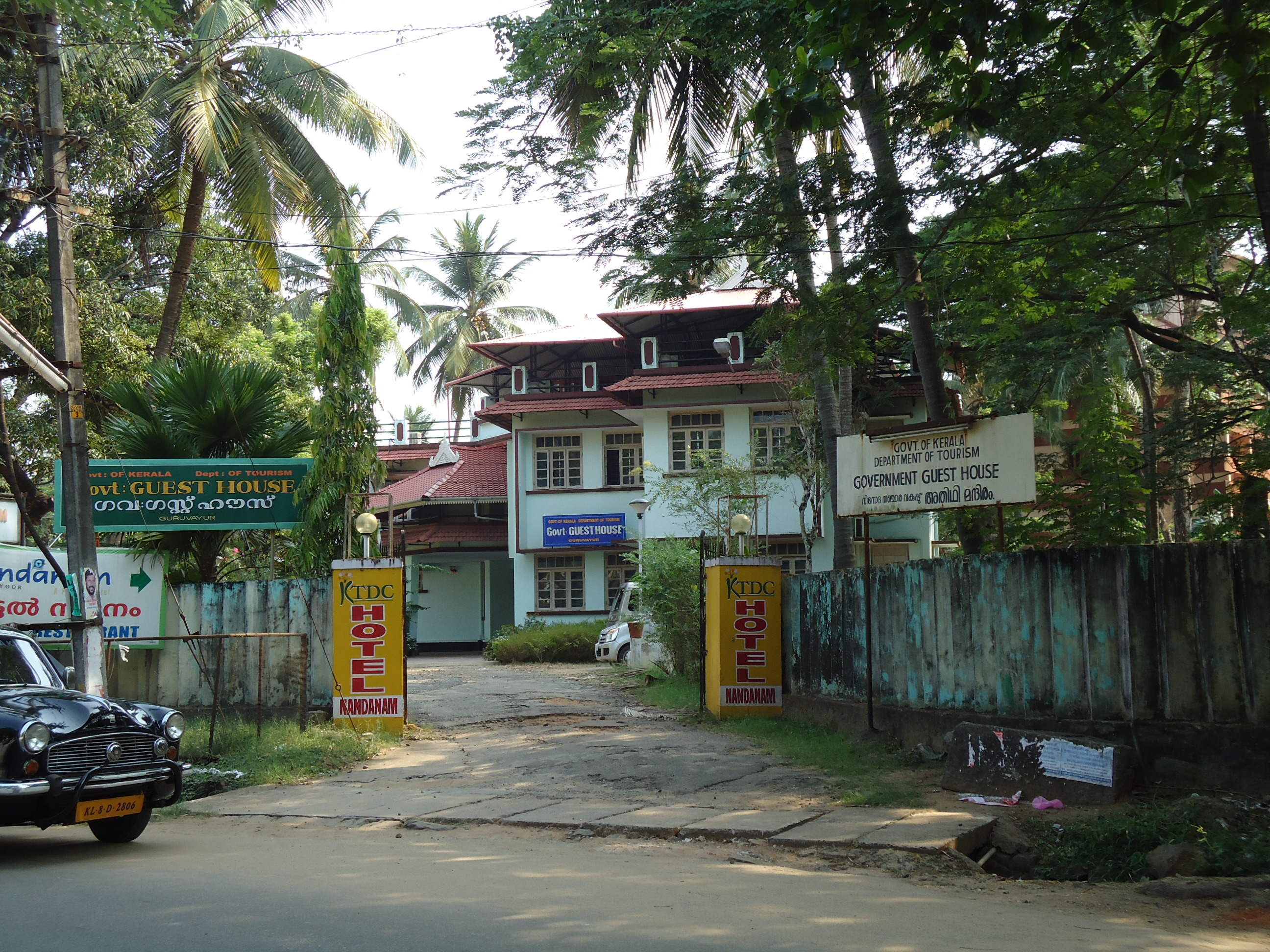
Government Guest House (Currently demolished to make space for new structure)

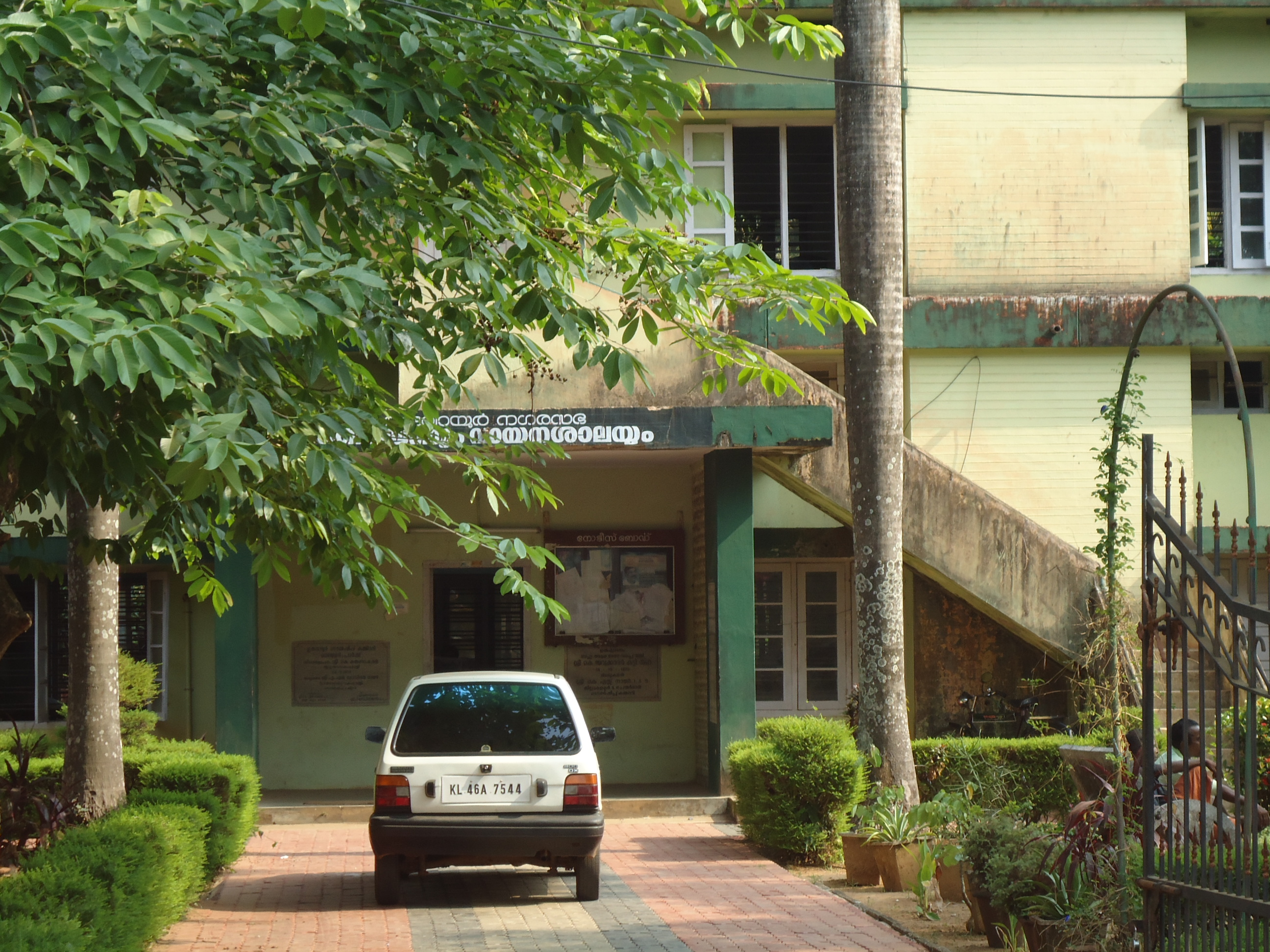
Guruvayur Library

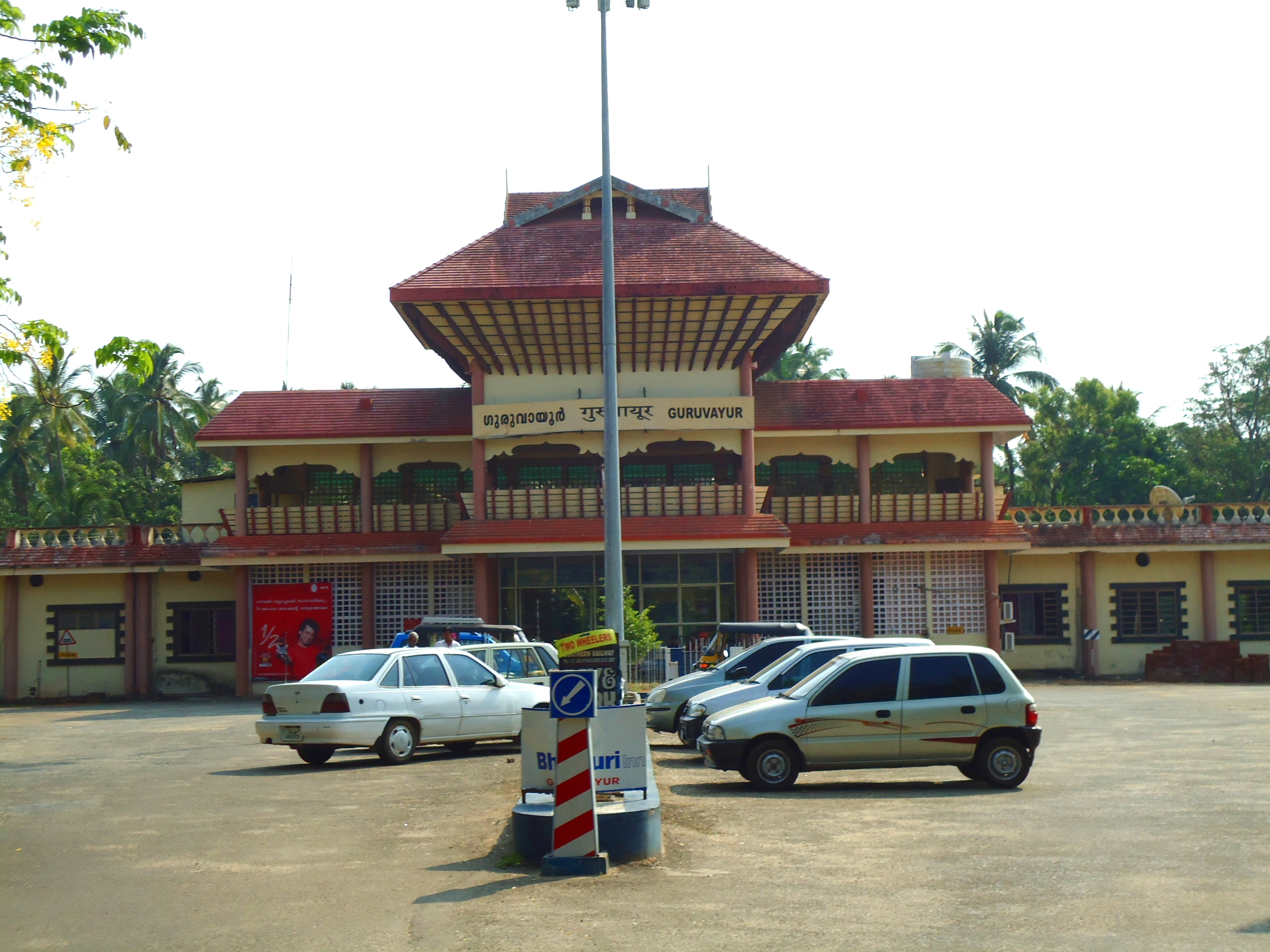
Guruvayur Railway Station

Guruvayur IPA: [guɾuʋɐːjuːr]) is a municipal temple town in Thrissur district, of Kerala State in India. It is a suburban town of Thrissur city, located 26 kilometres (16 mi) from Thrissur towards the north-west. It houses the Guruvayur Shri Krishna Temple. It is located at a distance of 292 km (181 mi) from the state capital Trivandrum towards the north-west, 86 km (53 mi) from Kochi towards the north, 95 km (59 mi) from Calicut towards south. Unlike most of Thrissur district, which was historically part of Cochin state, Guruvayur formed part of the erstwhile Kozhikode headquartered Malabar district.

== Etymology ==
According to Hindu legend, the deity Krishna is said to have asked a deity and a sage to take the idol from his temple in Dvaraka before it was destroyed by a flood, and establish it in Kerala. Accordingly, the idol of Krishna is believed to have been brought by the wind deity Vayu and Sage Brihaspati and was placed in Guruvayur. The name Guruvayur is a portmanteau of their names: Guru referring to the title of Brihaspati, Vayu referring to the deity. Ur is a Malayalam suffix that means city or settlement.

== Demographics ==
In 2010, the Municipal limits were expanded by merging nearby Pookode and Thaikkad panchayats. Thus, the total area of Municipality is 29.66 square kilometers comprising 43 wards with 67,006 population and population density of 2,259 per square kilometre.

Guruvayur religious data (2011)
Religions	Percent
Hinduism	73.76%
Islam	15.38%
Christianity	10.04%

== Government ==
Guruvayur Township was formed on 26 January 1962 with four electoral wards with an area of 6.49 square kilometres (2.51 sq mi). Later, the wards were increased to 10 and in 1994 to 20 when the township was upgraded to Municipality status with an area of 12.41 km^{2} (4.79 sq mi). In 2010, the electoral wards were increased to 43. Guruvayur is a Grade-1 Municipality. Guruvayur assembly constituency is part of Thrissur Lok Sabha constituency.

=== Festivals ===
==== Guruvayur Ekadashi ====
Ekadashi, the eleventh day of every lunar fortnight, is very auspicious to the Hindus. Of the 24 Ekadashis in a year, the Vrishchika Ekadashi (Sukla paksha) has got special significance in Guruvayur temple. A memorial honour for Gajarajan Keshavan is conducted in Guruvayur. The Karanavar or head of the elephant family places a wreath at the statue of Keshavan in front of Sreevalsam guest house and all the other elephants stand around and pay obeisance. On Ekadashi day, the Udayasthamana Pooja (dawn to dusk pooja) is conducted by the Devaswom itself . After the morning seeveli, on Ekadashi there is a grand elephant procession to the Parthasarathi temple since it is regarded as Geethopadesam Day also. On Ekadashi after night pooja, the famous Ekadashi Vilakku with elephant procession takes place and provides a fitting finale to the festival.

=== Chembai Sangeetholsavam ===
Chembai Sangeetholsavam is an annual Carnatic music festival held in Guruvayur by the Guruvayur Devaswom as a kind of homage to Chembai Vaidyanatha Bhagavatar, one of the titans of Carnatic Classical Music. Chembai had conducted the festival in the temple town on his own for about 60 years. He used to invite all the great Carnatic Musicians to perform in the temple town and in course of time, the scale of the festival rivalled the Thyagaraja Aradhana at Thiruvaiyaru, which is recognised as one of the most important festivals of homage paid to Saint Thyagaraja.

The Guruvayur Devaswom decided to take charge after his death in 1974, and renamed it as Chembai Sangeetholsavam in his memory. About 2000-2500 musicians participate in this festival every year, and it is held for about 12–15 days culminating on the Guruvayur Ekadashi day, when all the musicians sing 5 favourite songs of Chembai and also the Pancharatna Kritis of Thyagaraja.

== Notable landmarks ==
=== Guruvayur Temple ===
The Guruvayur Temple is a Hindu temple of Krishna. It is often referred to as Bhuloka Vaikuntham, meaning the holy abode of Vishnu on earth. The idol installed here represents a form of the deity Vishnu bearing four arms carrying the conch Panchajanya, the discus Sudarshana Chakra, the mace Kaumodaki, and the lotus. Adorned with a tulasi garland, the idol represents Vishnu as revealed to Vasudeva and Devaki at the time of his incarnation of Krishna. The presiding deity in the sanctum sanctorum is Vishnu. It faces east and is 4 feet tall. There are sub-shrines for Ganesha, Ayyappan, and Bhagavati inside the complex, and also two shrines for Ganesha and serpent deities under the temple outside the complex.

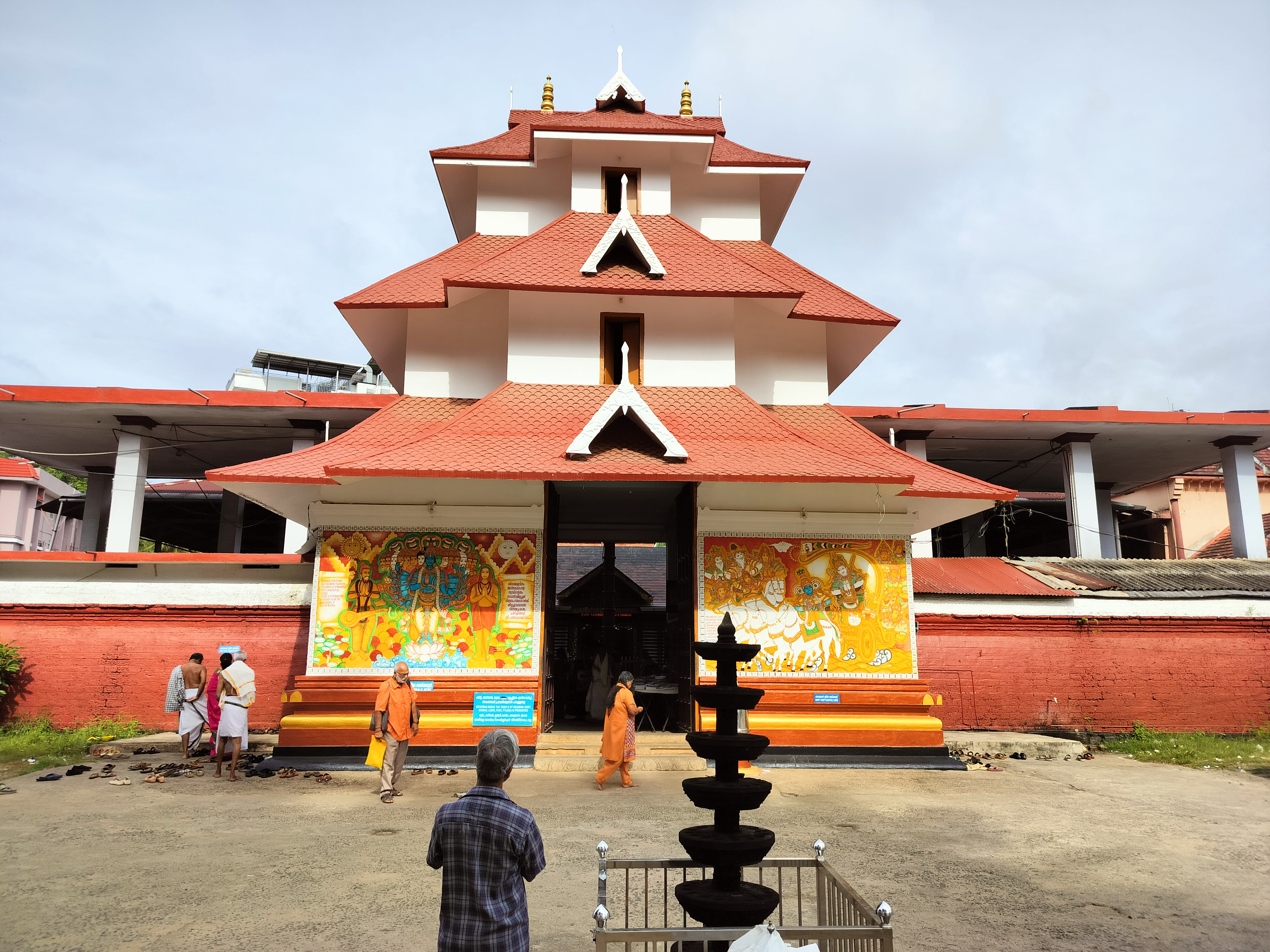
Sree pardhasaradhi temple guruvayur

=== Other ===
- Punnathur Kotta Elephant sanctuary
- Mammiyoor Temple
- Guruvayur Sree Parthasarathy Temple
- Krishnanattam

== Transport ==
=== Railway ===
The main rail transport system in Guruvayur is operated by the Southern Railway Zone of Indian Railways. Guruvayur Railway Station lies in the Thrissur-Guruvayur Section. It is the last station in this section. There are two passenger trains operating from Guruvayur Railway Station to Ernakulam Junction and another two passenger trains to Thrissur railway station every day. An overnight express train to Chennai Egmore via Ernakulam Junction, Kollam Junction, Thiruvananthapuram, Nagercoil Junction, Madurai, Trichy is also running from Guruvayur Railway Station every day. Thrissur railway station is the major rail head near to Guruvayur from where you can get all South Indian and North Indian trains.

=== Air ===
Cochin International Airport, the nearest airport from the town, is located 72 km (45 mi) from Guruvayur. All international, domestic and chartered flights are available here. Calicut International Airport at Karipur is about 100 km (62 mi) away.

== Climate ==
Climate data for Guruvayur, Kerala
Month	Jan	Feb	Mar	Apr	May	Jun	Jul	Aug	Sep	Oct	Nov	Dec	Year
Mean daily maximum °C (°F)	31.3 (88.3)	32.5 (90.5)	34.8 (94.6)	35.1 (95.2)	33.9 (93.0)	29.2 (84.6)	28.3 (82.9)	28.6 (83.5)	29.5 (85.1)	30.4 (86.7)	31.2 (88.2)	31.8 (89.2)	31.4 (88.5)
Mean daily minimum °C (°F)	20.6 (69.1)	22.3 (72.1)	24.7 (76.5)	25.7 (78.3)	25.3 (77.5)	23.7 (74.7)	23.0 (73.4)	23.5 (74.3)	23.6 (74.5)	23.7 (74.7)	23.5 (74.3)	21.2 (70.2)	23.4 (74.1)
Average precipitation mm (inches)	2 (0.1)	13 (0.5)	21 (0.8)	98 (3.9)	291 (11.5)	711 (28.0)	743 (29.3)	411 (16.2)	250 (9.8)	275 (10.8)	142 (5.6)	26 (1.0)	2,983 (117.5)
Source: Climate-Data.org

== Education ==
- Sree Krishna College, Guruvayur
- Little Flower College
- Sree Krishna Higher Secondary School
- Guruvayoor Dewasom English Medium School
- Aryabhatta College, Guruvayoor
