= Vadakke Madham Brahmaswam Vedic Research Centre =

Vedic school in Kerala, India

Coordinates: 10.5230°N 76.2092°E

- Location: Thrissur, Kerala, India
- Campus: Urban

Vadakke Madham Brahmaswam Vedic Research Centre is a residential institution for the study of vedas. It is located on the compound of Vadakke Madhom in Thrissur city of Kerala state in India. The centre once was the centre of learning for Vedas in South India and is the oldest Vedic school still running in India.
