= Mammiyoor Temple =

Shiva temple in Kerala

Mammiyoor Sree Mahadeva Temple
- Mammiyur Mahadeva Kshetram
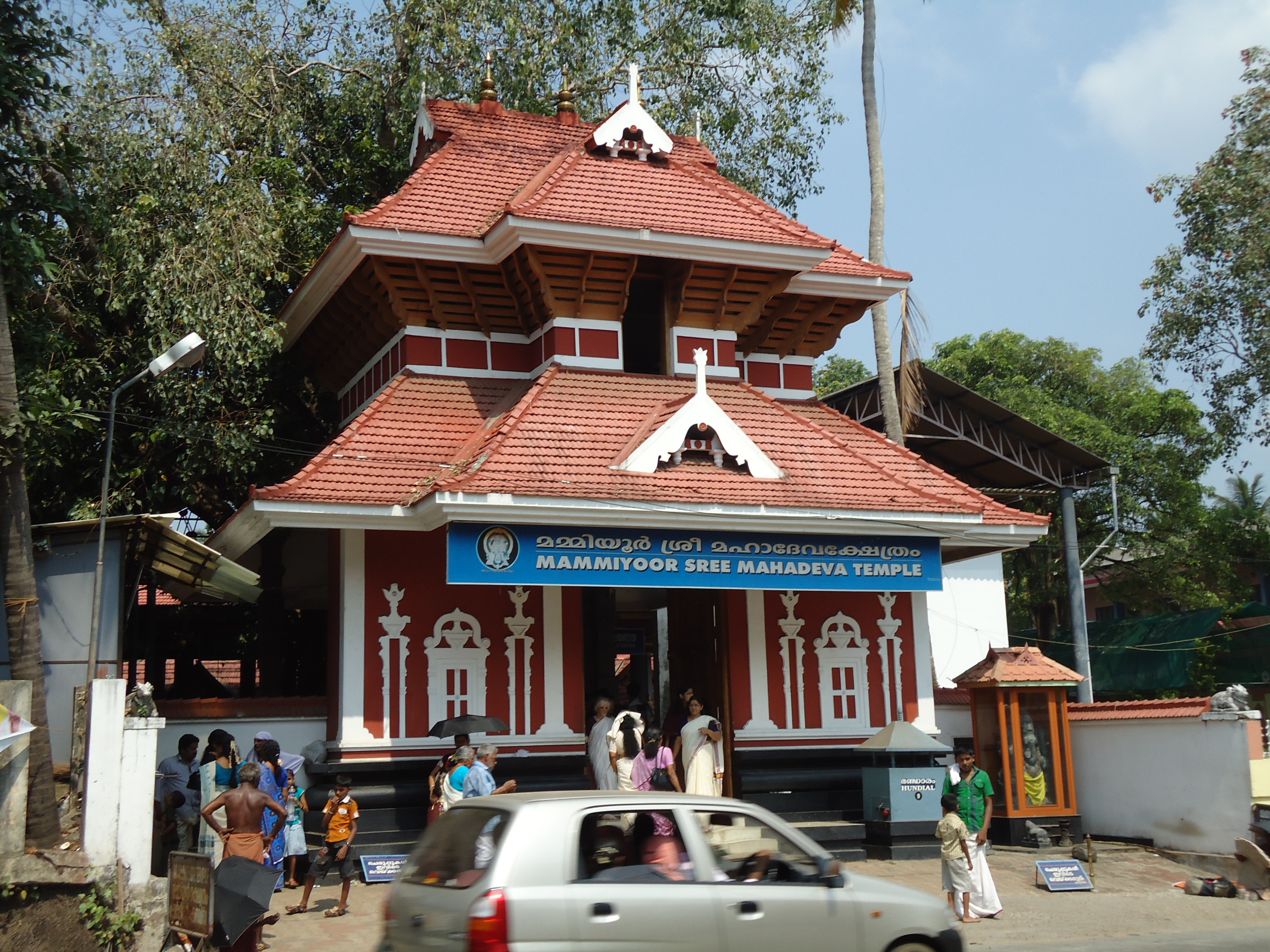

- Mahadeva Temple, Mammiyur, Thrissur, Kerala

Religion
- Affiliation: Hinduism
- District: Thrissur
- Deity: Shiva, Parvathi, Vishnu
- Festival: Shivarathri

Location
- Location: Mammiyur, Guruvayoor
- State: Kerala
- Country: India
- Coordinates: 10.599045°N 76.036069°E

Architecture
- Type: Architecture of Kerala
- Elevation: 27.29 m (90 ft)

Mammiyur Mahadeva Temple is a Shiva temple in Guruvayoor, Thrissur district of Kerala, India. The main deity is Shiva, who is installed in the concept of 'Uma Maheshwara' - his form with Parvathi on his left. There is a shrine for Vishnu. The sub-deities are Ganapathi, Subrahmanya, Ayyappan, Bhadrakali, Brahmarakshasa and Serpent deities. The temple is managed by Malabar Devaswom Board.
