= Kadavallur =

- village
- Location in Kerala, India Kadavallur (India)
- Coordinates: 10°41′0″N 76°5′0″E
- Country: India
- State: Kerala
- District: Thrissur

Government
  - Body: Gram panchayat

Languages
  - Official: Malayalam, English
- Time zone: UTC+5:30 (IST)
- ISO 3166 code: IN-KL
- Vehicle registration: KL-

Kadavallur is a village in the north of Thrissur district in Kerala, India. This village is the border of Thrissur and Malappuram districts, and is also very close to Palakkad district. It is situated 35 km north-west of Thrissur, 10 km north of Kunnamkulam, 5 km south of Changaramkulam, 4 km south-west of Chalissery and 14 km south-west of Pattambi.

It has an ancient temple dedicated to Sri Rama. The temple hosts the annual vedic contest called Anyonyam, which is an important event in namboothiri tradition.

== Archaeology ==
The 29 wooden bracket figures on the outer wall of the Srikoil of the Vishnu temple and other works of art in the same shrine are considered historically important, and it is a protected monument of the Archaeological Survey of India.

== Notable people ==
- Kalamandalam Girija (born 1958), Indian Kutiyattam dancer
