= Thiruvilwamala =

Thiruvilwamala Thiruvilluamala
- town
- Location in Kerala, India Thiruvilwamala (India)
- Coordinates: 10.7321277°N 76.4273357°E
- Country: India
- State: Kerala
- District: Palakkad

Area
  - Total: 37.94 km^{2} (14.65 sq mi)
- Elevation: 50 m (160 ft)

Population
  - Total: 24,175
  - Density: 637.2/km^{2} (1,650/sq mi)

Languages
  - Official: Malayalam, English
- Time zone: UTC+5:30 (IST)
- PIN: 680588
- Telephone code: 04884
- Vehicle registration: KL-48
- Nearest city: Ottapalam
- Sex ratio: 1105:1000 ♂/♀
- Literacy: 83.85%
- Lok Sabha constituency: Alathur
- Climate: moderate (Köppen)

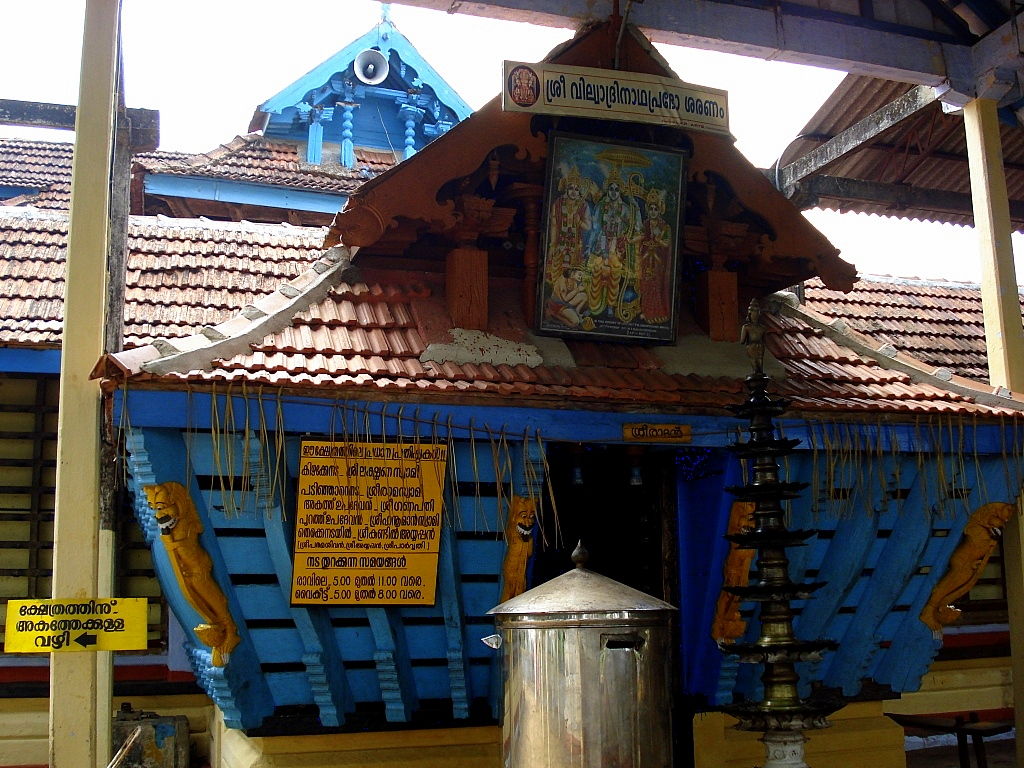
VilvadhrinathaTemple

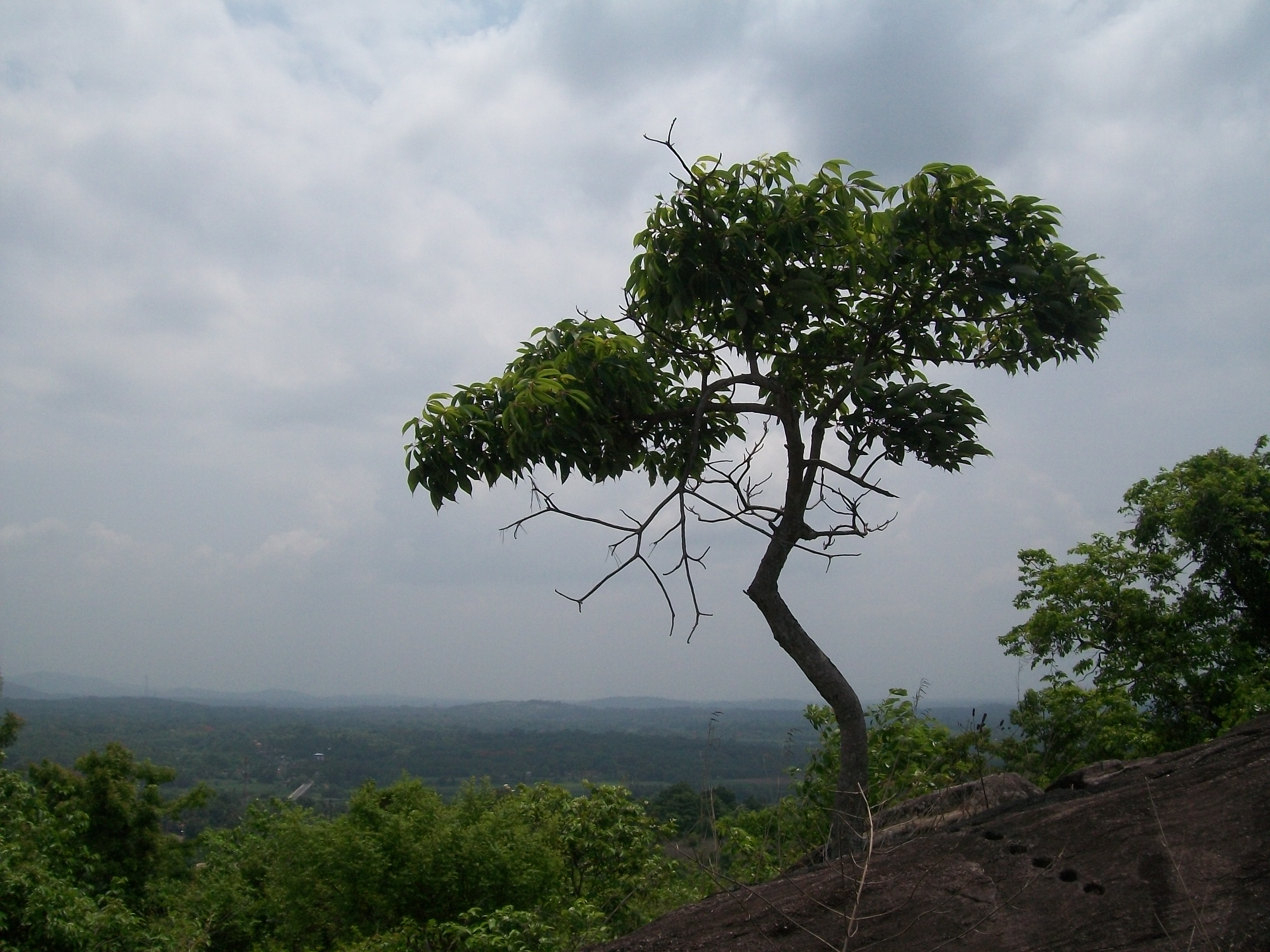
Thiruvilwamala Hill

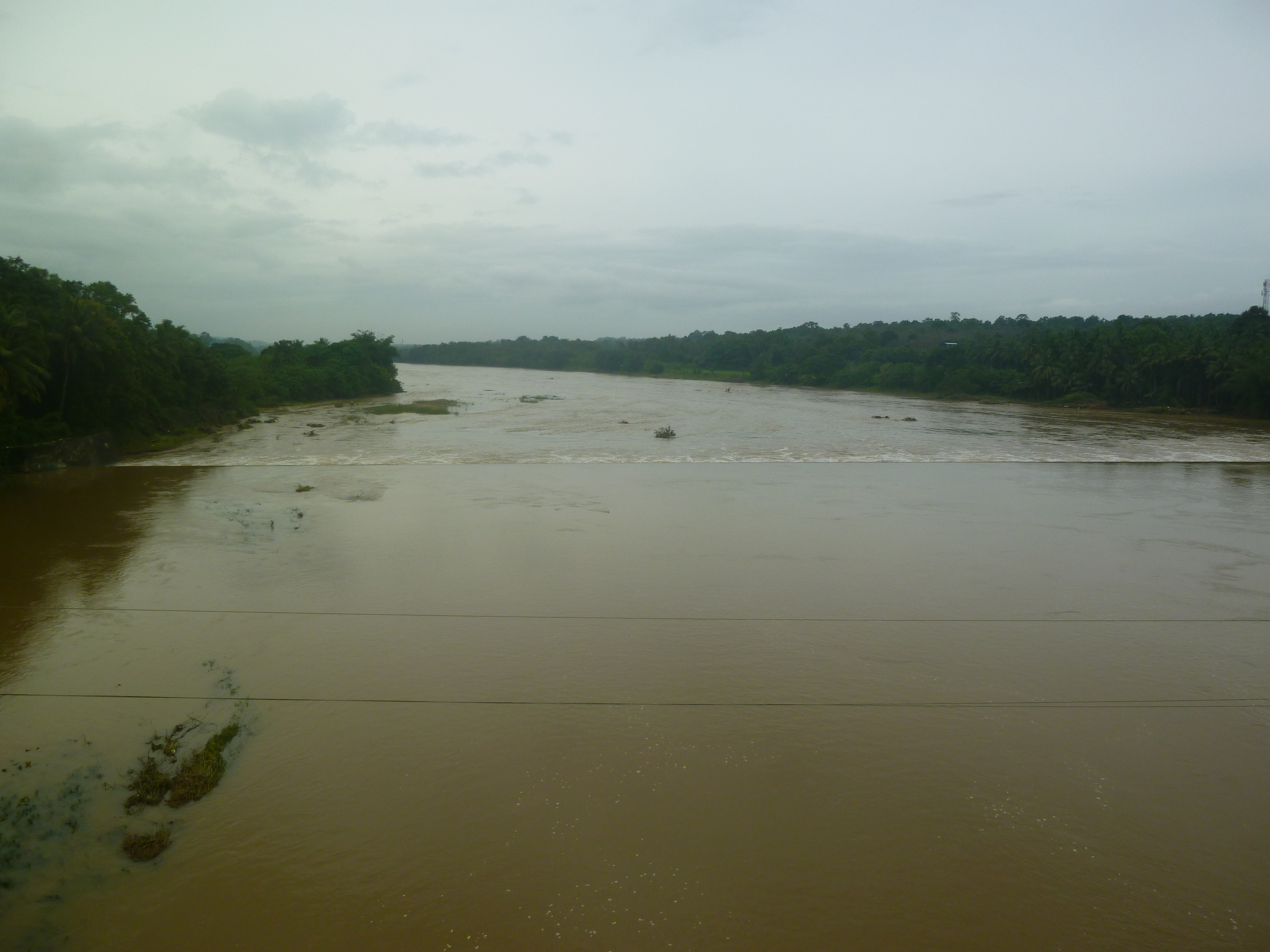
View of Bharathappuzha from Pampady, Thiruvilwamala

Thiruvilwamala is a hilly village in the northern region of Thrissur district, in the state of Kerala, southern India. It is located 47 kilometres northeast of district headquarters Thrissur. Kasavu clothing is made in Kuthampully, a nearby village.

== Location ==
The village, which is more of a temple town, is located on the banks of the Bharathappuzha river, with the nearest towns being Chelakkara, Ottapalam, Pazhayannur, and Shoranur. The Vilwadrinatha Temple, which is among the rare Sri Rama temples in Kerala, is in Thiruvilwamala. Even though people believe the deity as Lord Rama, actually it is of Lord Vishnu. There is another shrine for Lord Lakshmana, the younger brother of Lord Rama, inside the temple. Both the brothers have equal importance here. There are sub-shrines for Ganesha, Hanuman, Shiva, Parvati, Ayyappan and Serpent deities. Niramaala are Ekadashi are festive events.

== Noted personalities ==
Noted writer V. K. N. (Vadakke Koottala Narayanankutty Nair) Maanasi and V.K.K.Ramesh, P.A.Divakaran hails from this place. The poet P. Kunhiraman Nair had stayed here for long, having fallen in love with the scenic beauty and culture of the place. Raobahadur T.K. Nair, a former minister in Cochin State, hailed from this place. Current Kerala High Court Judge Ashok Menon & Additional Director General of Police Padmakumar IPS belong to Thiruvilwamala. The place has also given birth to prominent artists in the field of Kathakali, especially madhalam players like Venkichan Swamy and his pupils Appukutty Poduval & Chinna Kutta Poduval. It is the home of Carnatic musicians; the Sri Rama temple that hosts a relay south Indian classical concert on the auspicious day of ekadasi.

== Temples ==
Thiruvilwamala has many other ancient temples and more than four Shiva destination. Ivor Madom, the Krishna temple, has ceremonies performed in order to ensure peace after death.It is a contains a crematorium. Other significant temple is Kayarampara Parakottu Kavu Devi temple. The word 'Parakottu' refers to its position on the rocky topography. It is located close to the Vilvadhrinatha temple. There is also a Sai Baba temple nearby.

== Caves ==
Punarjani Guha (cave) is another major attraction in Thiruvilwamala, which is situated between the Vilwamala and the Bhoothamala towards the east of the Vilwadrinatha temple. It is a natural tunnel in the rocky hill. There is a belief that all the sins will be washed away if a person cross the cave from one end to the other and the person will be free from further births. Crossing the cave is difficult as one have to crawl through narrow sections to reach the other end. This ritual is known as 'Punarjani noozhal'. Only men are allowed to perform this ritual. This cave will be open to the public only on the Ekadasi day and hundreds of people participate in this ritual each year.

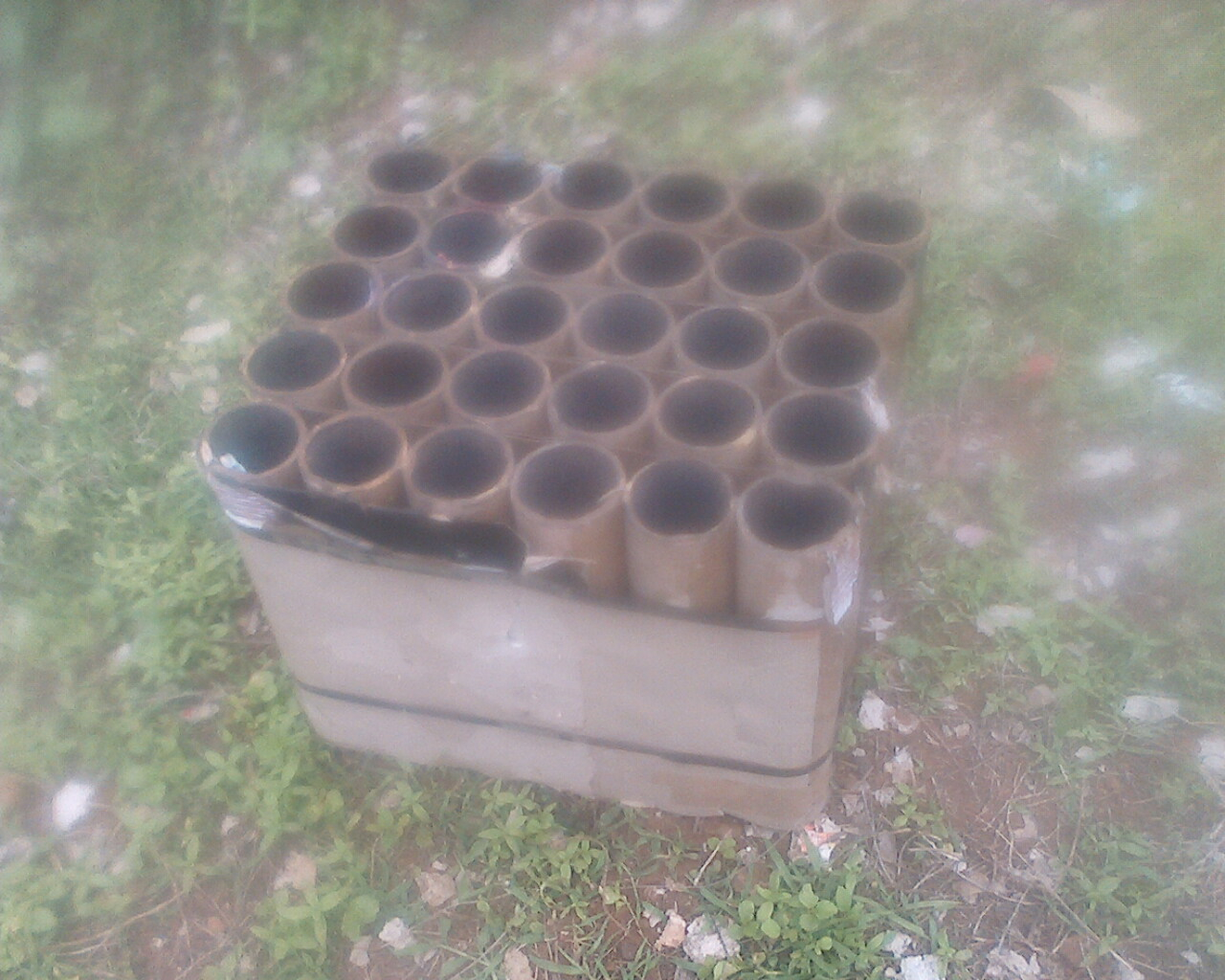
Fireworks at Thiruvilwavamala

== Festivals ==
The Parakkottukavu Thalappoli festival falls on the last Sunday of the Malayalam month of Medam (mid-May). The firework spectacles in this pooram would match up to the fireworks of the world-famous Thrissur Pooram.

== Kuzhi Minnal ==
Kuzhu Mannal (or Kuzhal Minnal) is gunpowder filled in earth holes and measured in pounds. It has enormous doppler effect due to the hilly Thiruvilwamala region. Picture here shows one of a series of end part of the Thalappoli fireworks. The fumes released are said to purify the atmosphere particularly when crowds gather and the chance of diseases spreading increase.

== Education ==
- Govt. Vocational Higher Secondary School, Kattukulam
- G.U.P.S Kuthampully
- Seventh Day Adventist Higher Secondary School, Temple Rd
- Govt. Higher Secondary School, Pampady
- Nehru College of Engineering and Research Centre, Pampady
- Nehru College of Pharmacy, Pampady
- Christ New Life ICSE School, Punarjani Garden

== See also ==
- Thiruvilwamala Temple
