= Guruvayur Temple =

Hindu temple in Guruvayur, Kerala, India

- ഗുരുവായൂർ ശ്രീകൃഷ്ണസ്വാമിക്ഷേത്രം
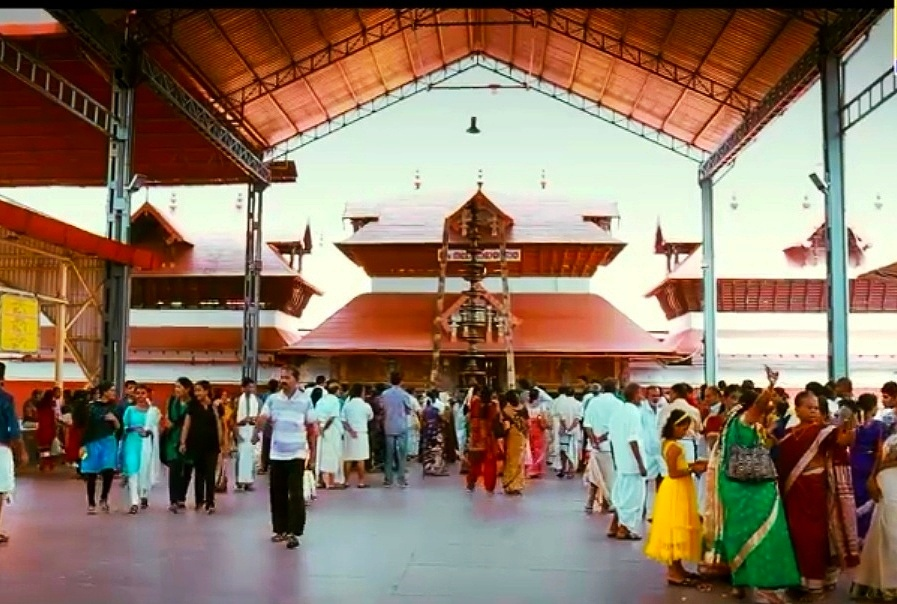
- Guruvayur Temple

- Location within Kerala Location within India Location within Asia

Religion
- Affiliation: Hinduism
- District: Thrissur
- Deity: Guruvayurappan (Vishnu in his form of Krishna)
- Festivals: Janmashtami, Kumbham Utsavam, Guruvayur Ekadasi
- Governing body: Guruvayur Devaswom Board

Location
- Location: Guruvayur
- State: Kerala
- Country: India
- Coordinates: 10.5945°N 76.0390°E

Architecture
- Type: Kerala Architecture
- Creator: As per tradition, Vishwakarma (sculptor); Brihaspati and Vayu (pratishta)
- Completed: The temple was completed around 14th century. The earliest temple records date back to the 17th century.

Website
- guruvayurdevaswom.in guruvayurtemple.org

The Guruvayur Temple, also called the Guruvayur Sree Krishna Temple, is situated in the town of Guruvayur, Thrissur district, Kerala, India. Located approximately 26 kilometers (16 miles) northwest of Thrissur city, the temple is dedicated to the deity Guruvayurappan, a form of Krishna-Vishnu. it is classified as one among the 108 Abhimana Kshethrams (honuored temples) of the Sri Vaishnava tradition.

== Legend ==
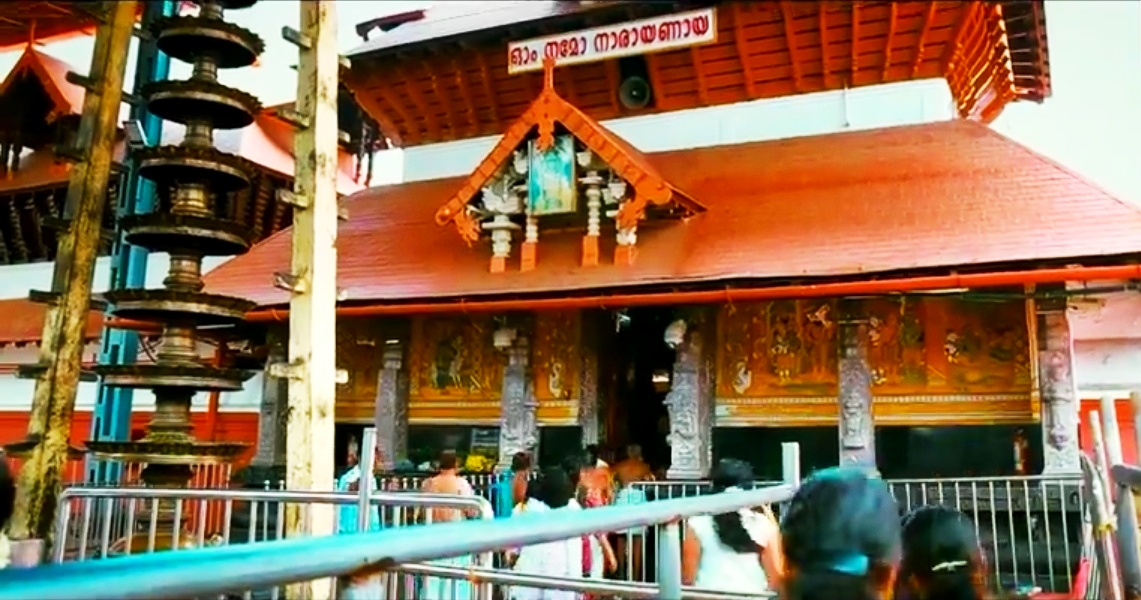
Main entrance to the temple

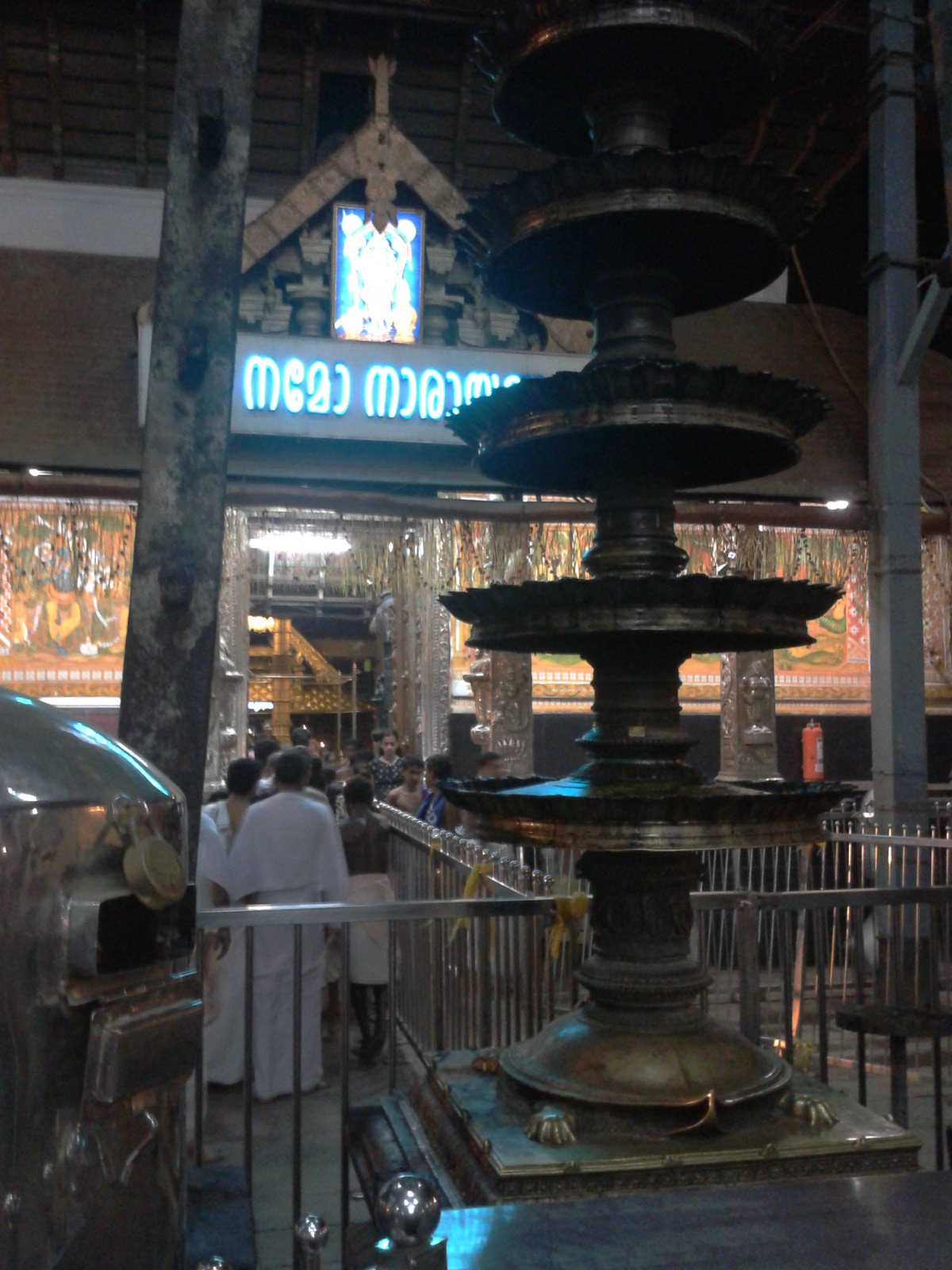
Guruvayur temple entrance

According to the Gurupavanapura Mahatmya in the Narada Purana, the central icon of the Guruvayur Temple was created by Vishnu in Vaikuntha. The idol was entrusted to Brahma, who gifted it to King Sutapas and his consort Prishni. Legend holds that Vishnu granted the couple the boon of worshipping the idol across three successive rebirths, culminating in the Dvapara Yuga when Vishnu incarnated as Krishna.

Following the svargarohanam (heavenly ascent) of Krishna and the subsequent submergence of the city of Dvaraka, the idol was retrieved by Krishna's disciple, Uddhava. Uddhava entrusted the relic to Brihaspati (Guru, the preceptor of the gods) and Vayu (the wind god). They carried the idol south and installed it at its current location, which was designated by Shiva. The name of the place, Guruvayur, is a portmanteau derived from Guru and Vayu, while -ur stands for place in the local language. Shiva then relocated to the adjacent Mammiyoor Temple to maintain his presence over the main shrine.

The temple's association with physical healing stems from the legend of King Janamejaya. Cursed with leprosy after performing a sarpa yajna (snake sacrifice), Janamejaya was advised by the sage Dattatreya to worship Krishna at Guruvayur. After a period of devotion at the shrine, Janamejaya was cured of his affliction.

== Architectural style ==
The Guruvayur Temple is an example of the traditional Kerala architectural style, characterised by its sloped roofs, copper sheeting, and extensive use of wood and laterite stone. The entire complex is oriented to the east, with the main sanctum, the Srikovil, facing the rising sun.

The Srikovil is a rectangular, two-storied structure. Its roof is covered with copper sheets and plated with gold. The inner structure is divided into three rooms, culminating in the garbhagriha (innermost sanctum). The srikovil walls are a canvas for exquisite murals, which, though damaged in the fire of 1970, were meticulously restored in the 1980s. Inside, in addition to the mulavigraha (main idol), are two processional idols: a gold idol used for the daily sriveli (procession) and an 18th-century panchaloha (five-metal alloy) idol reserved for the arattu (holy bath) ceremony. Behind the main idol lies a huge shaligram stone, believed to amplify the energy of the shrine.

The main deity, Guruvayurappan, is a standing, four-armed manifestation Vishnu, approximately 1.2 metres tall, carved from shaligram stone. The idol holds the divine attributes—Panchajanya (conch), the Sudarshana Chakra (discus), the Kaumodaki (mace), and the Padma (lotus)—thereby representing the Janardana form of Vishnu.

The complex is flanked by various auxiliary shrines. These include the roofless vanadurga (forest Durga) shrine of Idatharikathu Kavu Bhagavathi, and shrines dedicated to Ganesha. The sub-shrine of Dharmashastha (Ayyappan) is located to the southeast, who is worshipped in the Dhancantari bhava (physician form).

== Temple Layout ==
The architectural integrity of the Guruvayur temple extends beyond the Srikovil to its surrounding structures, forming a cohesive sacred space. The central shrine is immediately enclosed by the Nalambalam (inner courtyard), a rectangular structure that houses the auxiliary shrines of Ganapathi and Ayyappan. Surrounding the Nalambalam is the Chuttambalam (outer enclosure building), which accommodates the Thidappally (temple kitchen) and various storage rooms for ceremonial items. A notable feature integrated into the Chuttambalam is the Vilakkumatam (lamp house), a structure comprising multiple platforms designed to hold thousands of oil lamps, which are lit on special occasions creating a spectacular sight.

Outside the inner complex, directly facing the Srikovil, stands the towering Deepastambham (lamp pillar), an imposing granite structure plated with gold. Just before the Deepastambham is the Dwajasthambham (flagmast), also gold-plated, which is crucial for the annual Utsavam (festival). The entire complex is encompassed by a massive outer wall, the Maryada (boundary wall). Entry is facilitated through two prominent Gopurams (entrance towers), the Kizhakke Gopuram (Eastern Gopuram) serving as the main entrance.

Adjacent to the northern side of the temple complex is the Rudratheertham (temple tank), the sacred pond associated with Lord Shiva. Devotees often bathe here before entering the main shrine.

== History ==
=== Early History and Etymology ===
The location is mentioned as "Kuruvayur" in the 14th-century Tamil text "Kokasandesam". The Old Tamil root kuruvai suggests a meaning related to "sea" or a "village on the Malabar Coast". The name was popularly Sanskritized to 'Guruvayur,' a practice often attributed to Melpathur Narayana Bhattathiri, the author of Narayaneeyam (16th century). By the close of the 16th century, Guruvayur had solidified its status as a principal pilgrimage center in Kerala.

=== Foreign Invasions and Relocation ===
The temple sustained damage during regional conflicts. In 1716, a Dutch raid led to the looting of treasures and the burning of the Western Gopuram, which was later reconstructed in 1747. Hyder Ali's invasion in 1766 saw the temple spared only after a ransom was paid. A more severe threat emerged during Tipu Sultan's invasion in 1789, necessitating the secret relocation of the main idol to the Ambalappuzha Sree Krishna Swamy Temple for safekeeping. The temple was saved from destruction by a sudden rainstorm, and the idol was re-installed on September 17, 1792, following Tipu's defeat.

=== Guruvayur Satyagraha (1931–1947) ===
This pivotal non-violent protest, led by figures like K. Kelappan and A. K. Gopalan, demanded the entry of 'Avarna' (people not belonging to a varna) into the temple. Following a public mandate and the Madras Government’s Temple Entry Proclamation, the Guruvayur Temple was officially opened to all Hindus on June 2, 1947.

=== The 1970 Fire and Restoration ===
A catastrophic fire on November 30, 1970, severely damaged the temple, destroying the Chuttambalam (the surrounding inner building) and the Vilakkumatam (lamp house) on the west, south, and north sides. Crucially, the Srikovil, the main idol, and the shrines of Ganapathi and Ayyappan were preserved. A major public restoration effort followed, replacing structures and sculptures, including the Ananthashayanam painting, which was lost in the blaze and subsequently replaced by a granite sculpture.

=== The 1985 Temple Theft ===
A notorious theft involving precious ornaments, including the Nagapadathali and the Mahalakshmi Mala, occurred on March 31, 1985. The incident, coinciding with the demitting of office by the outgoing Melshanthi, led to political controversy, although the accused priests were eventually exonerated in 1993.

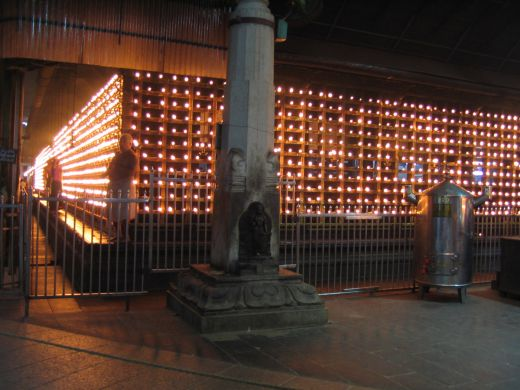
The Vilakkumatham

== Administration and Priesthood ==
The temple's administration is overseen by the Guruvayur Devaswom Board, a statutory authority operating under the supervision of the Government of Kerala via the Guruvayur Devaswom Act.

The temple's ritual system follows the framework established by Adi Shankara and formalized by Chennas Ravinarayanan Nambudiri (1427-1527), whose descendants, the Puzhakara Chennas Namboothirippad family, hold the hereditary position of Thantri (Head Priest).

- The Melshanthi (Chief Priest) is appointed for a six-month term and must observe strict celibacy (Brahmacharya) and remain within the temple premises (Purappadashanthi) throughout his tenure.
- Othikkans (Ritual Assistants) are drawn from four specific families and serve as the designated deputies for the Tantri and Melshanthi in their absence, a system shared only with the Thrippunithura Sree Poornathrayeesha Temple.
- On 2025, High court of Kerala verdicts that everyone are eligible to the thantri of the temple, irrespective of their castes. This was in response to the case filed by the organization of Nambudiri brahmins to restrict entry of other castes as priest in temples in Kerala.

== Festivals and Worship ==
The main festivals of this temple are the 10-day festival in the Malayalam month of Kumbham starting with flag hoisting on Pooyam star, Krishna Janmashtami (Birthday of Krishna) in the month of Chingam, Ekadasi (11th day) in the shukla paksha (bright fortnight) in the month of Vrischikam, popularly called as the Guruvayur Ekadasi and Vishu on the first day of the month of Medam, once a harvest festival.

== Marriage Ceremony ==
The Guruvayur Temple is one of the most significant and busiest venues for Hindu marriages in Kerala. The weddings are characterized by their simplicity and strict adherence to specific temple customs. The ceremonies are primarily held at the Kalyana Mandapam (wedding hall) located outside the Eastern gateway of the temple complex. A key characteristic is the absence of a rigidly fixed, pre-calculated auspicious time (muhurtam); weddings are permitted at any time the temple doors are open. The garlands exchanged by the couples are traditionally made of Tulsi (Holy Basil), a plant sacred to Lord Vishnu. Due to the temple rule prohibiting the immediate entry of a newly married couple into the inner courtyard (Nalambalam), the bride and groom typically seek the deity's blessings inside the main temple premises either on the preceding day or prior to proceeding to the Mandapam for the ceremony. The widespread belief is that marriage conducted at this site ensures a prosperous marital life and the continuous grace (Kataksham) of Guruvayurappan. Many devotees also adhere to the custom of visiting the temple regularly, either annually or monthly, following their wedding

== Punnathurkotta Elephant Sanctuary ==
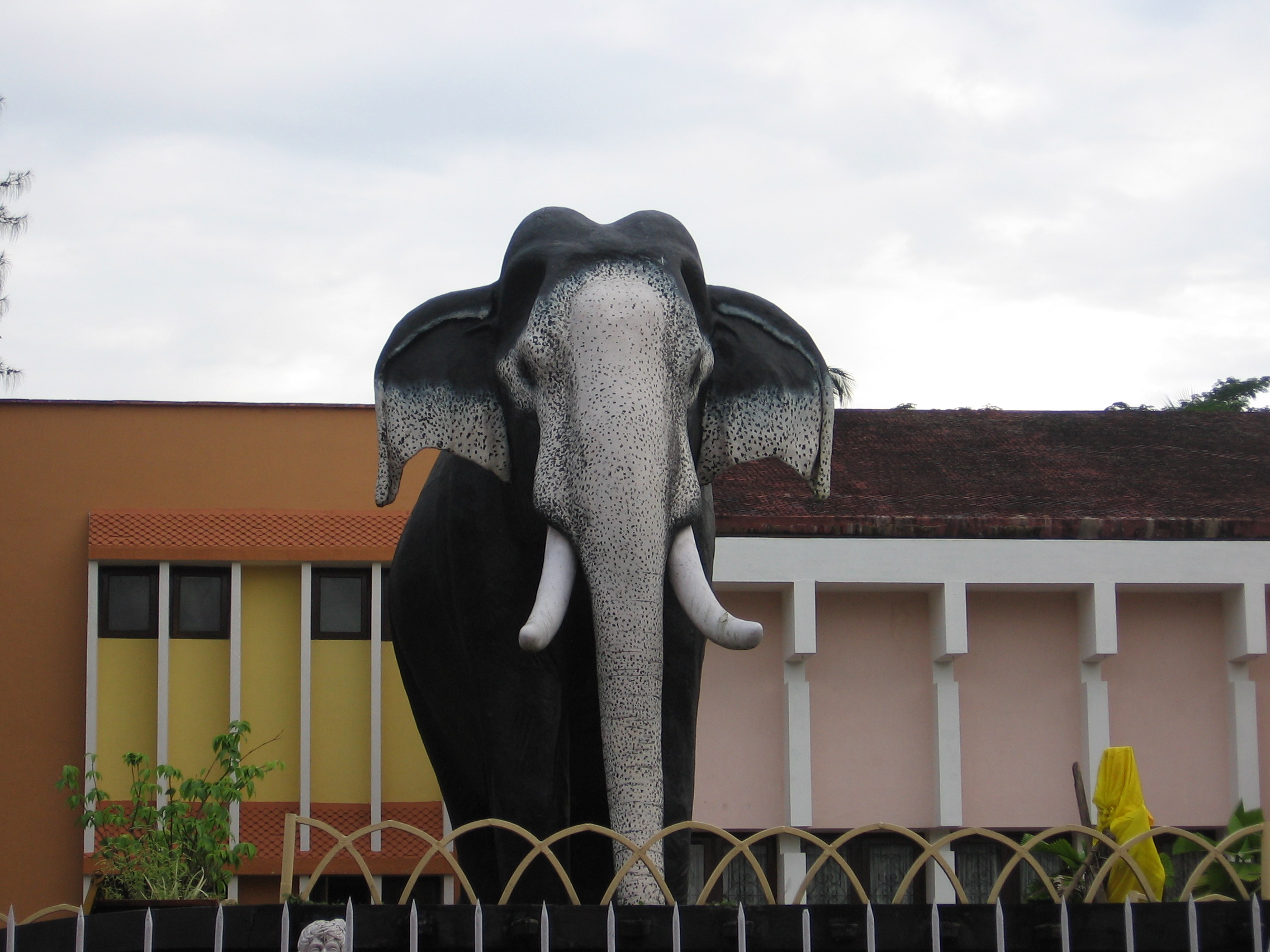
Statue of Guruvayur Kesavan at Guruvayur

The Punnathur kotta (Anakotta), an elephant yard maintained by the temple, is located three kilometers from the main shrine. It houses approximately 35 captive Asian elephants, primarily offerings from devotees. The sanctuary is notable for its large population of tusked male elephants and has been cited by the Animal Welfare Board of India for violations regarding the treatment and living conditions of the animals.

== See also ==
- Mammiyoor Temple
- Hindu temples of Kerala

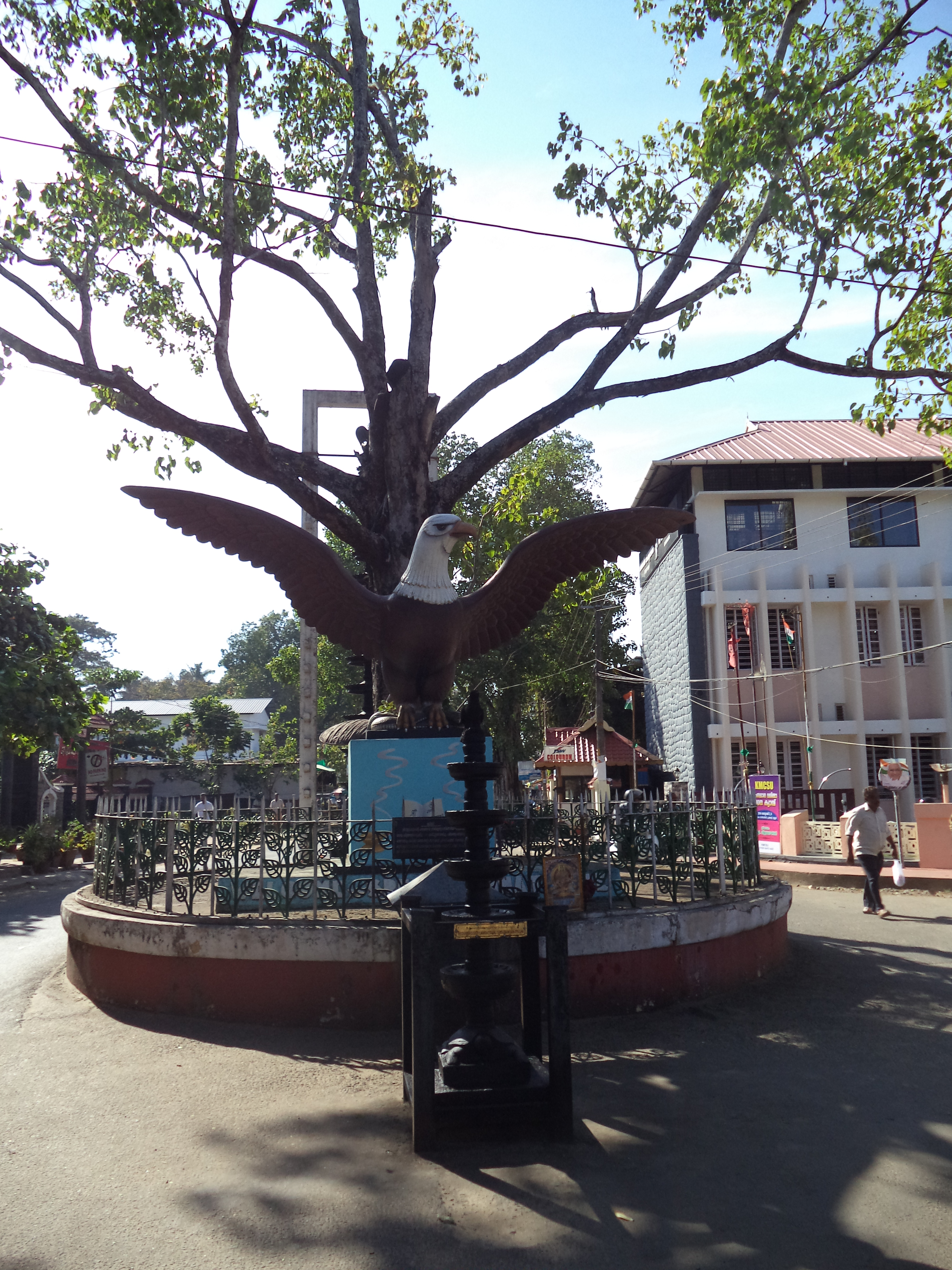
Garuda statue in Guruvayur Temple
