= Guruvayur Ekadasi =

11th day of the Indian solar month Vrishchika

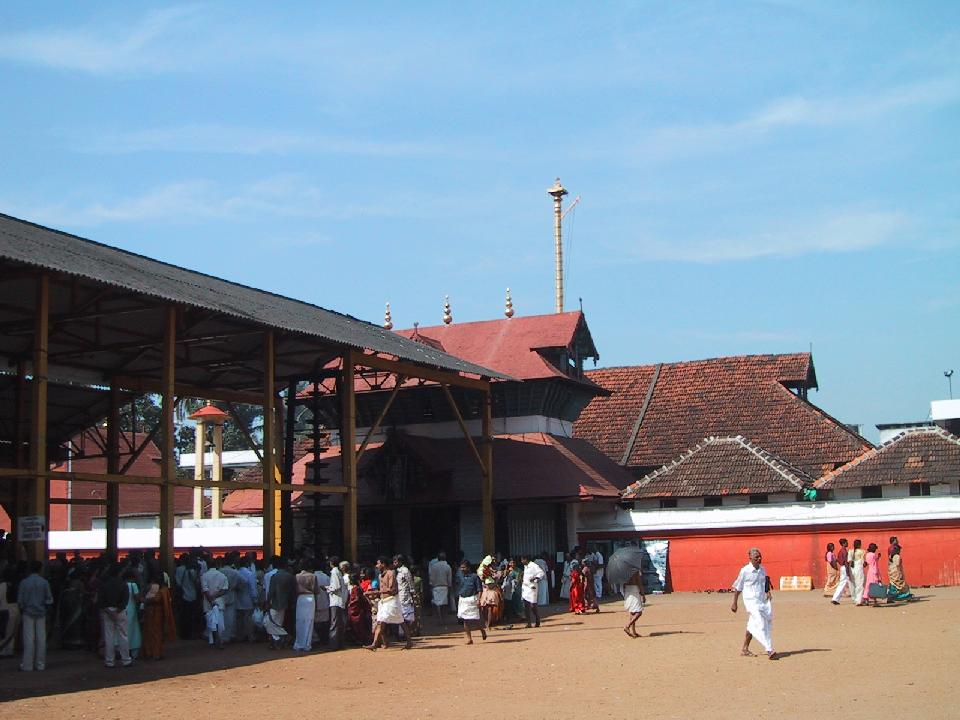
Guruvayur Temple Entrance

Guruvayur Ekadasi in Guruvayur is the 11th day of Vrishchika. It falls in the Mandala season. The Navami (9th day) and Dasami (10th day) are also important. Vilakku Ekadasi starts a month before with offerings by individuals, families and organisations. The temple is open on this day for Nirmalya Darshan at 3 a.m.. It is closed at 9.00 am on Dwadasi (12th day)offerings of a token amount called Dwadasi Panam in Koothambalam take place.

On Guruvayur Ekadasi a memorial is held for Gajarajan Guruvayoor Kesavan and the Chembai Sangeetholsavam. The Karanavar or head of the elephant family places a wreath at the statue of Kesavan in front of Sreevalsam guest house while the other elephants stand around and pay obeisance. On Ekadasi, the Udayasthamana Pooja (dawn to dusk pooja) is conducted by the Devaswom. After the morning seeveli, on Ekadasi an elephant procession to the Parthasarathi temple since it is regarded as Geethopadesam Day. On Ekadasi after the night pooja the famous Vilakku Ekadasi with elephant procession takes place and provides a finale to the festival.
