= Vadakke Madhom =

Hindu pilgrimage site in Kerala, India

Brahmaswam Madham
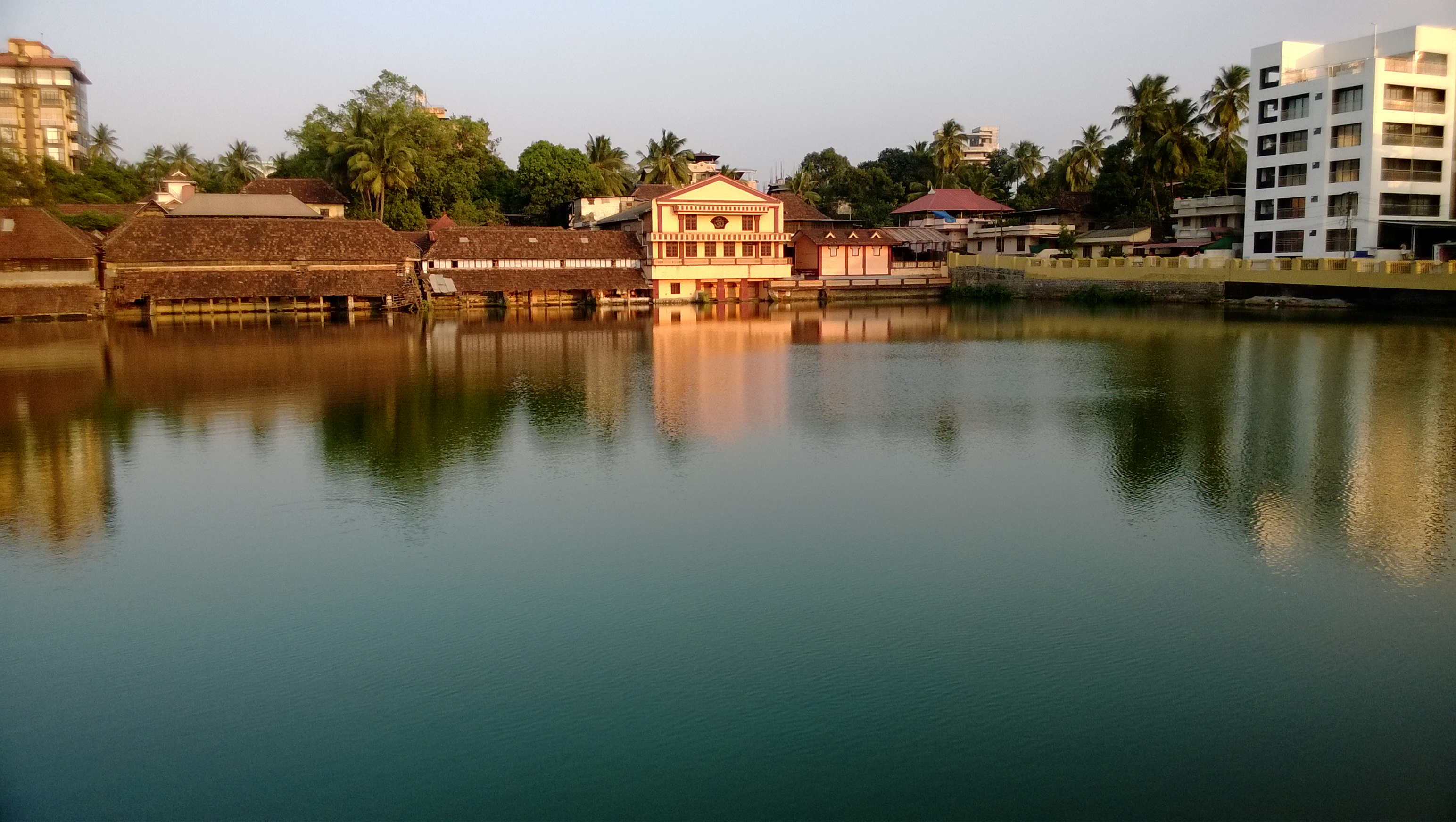
- A view of Brahmaswam Madham from Padinjarechira pond

- Location within Kerala Location within India
- Location: Thrissur city, Kerala
- Coordinates: 10.522°N 76.209°E
- Type: Artificial pond
- Basin countries: India
- Surface area: 4 acres (1.6 ha)

Vadakke Madhom, popularly known as Brahmaswam Madham, is one of the four ancient South Indian madhoms that propagate Adwaita or nondualism. Spiritual leader Adi Shankara's disciple Hasthamalakacharya started the Madhom. It is located at Thrissur city in Kerala, India. Totakacharya was the first Madhapathi (Head) of Vadakke Madhom.
