= Elephants in Kerala =

Overview of role of the elephants in culture of Kerala

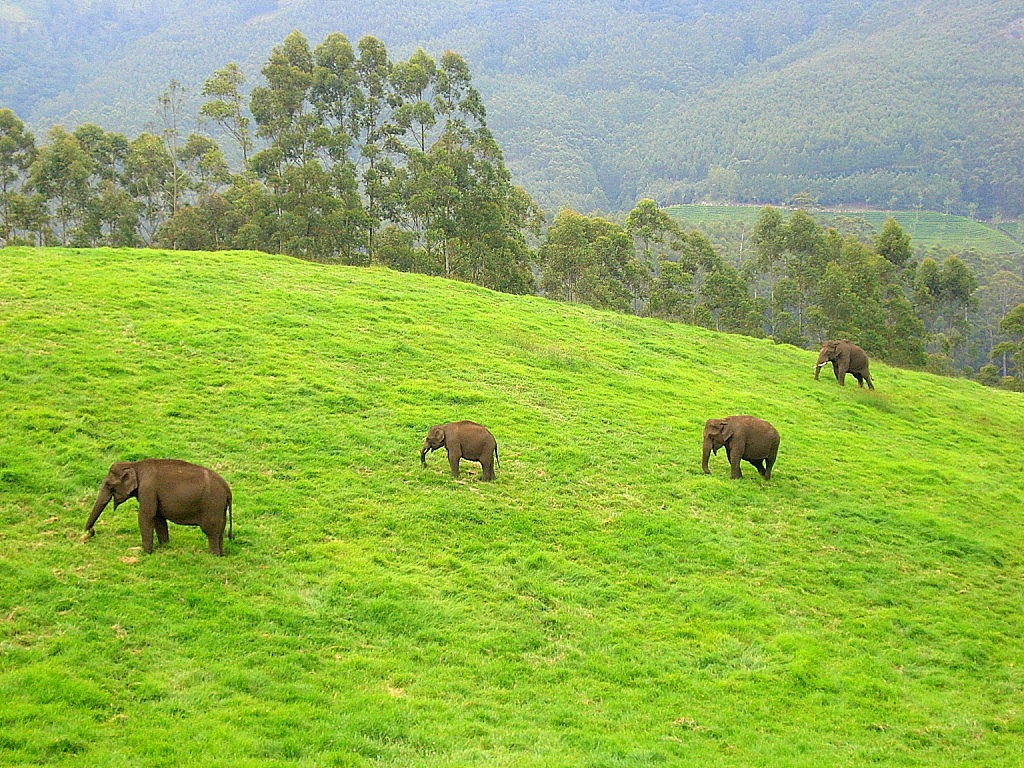
Wild elephants in Munnar

The native elephants of Kerala are Indian elephants (Elephas maximus indicus), one of three recognized subspecies of the Asian elephant. Since 1986, Asian elephants have been listed as endangered by the IUCN, with the worldwide population declining by at least 50% over the last three generations, now estimated to be between 25,600 and 32,750 in the wild. Preeminent threats include by habitat fragmentation, degradation, and loss, human-elephant conflict (HEC), and poaching, as human populations increase globally.

Estimates of the number of wild elephants in Kerala vary, with an official 2024 census estimating just under 1,800 elephants. Prior estimates (using significantly different estimation techniques) include 4,286 wild elephants according to a 1993 census, and 5,706 according to a 2017 census. There appears to be some disagreement as to which techniques yield the most accurate estimates, with factors such as elephant migration patterns to nearby states potentially affecting wild elephant counts.

Along with a considerable population of wild elephants, in 2025 Kerala has about 400 captive elephants, down from more than 500 in 2018. Most captive elephants in Kerala are owned by temples or individuals, with some owned by the government forest department. Privately owned elephants are most commonly used in festivals and religious ceremonies, though some are made to work in timber logging or otherwise kept as pets or status symbols. Animal activists in the region have alleged that some captive elephants in Kerala and southern India are frequently subject to abuse or poor living conditions.

Elephants in Kerala are often referred to as the "sons of the sahya" (cf. poem "Sahyante Makan" by Vyloppalli Sreedhara Menon). As the state animal, the elephant is featured on the emblem of the Government of Kerala, taken from the royal arms of both Travancore and Cochin. It is believed by some that an elephant that has been captured in the wild, and tamed, will never be accepted by other wild elephants, a claim contested by some activists.

== Elephants in festivals ==
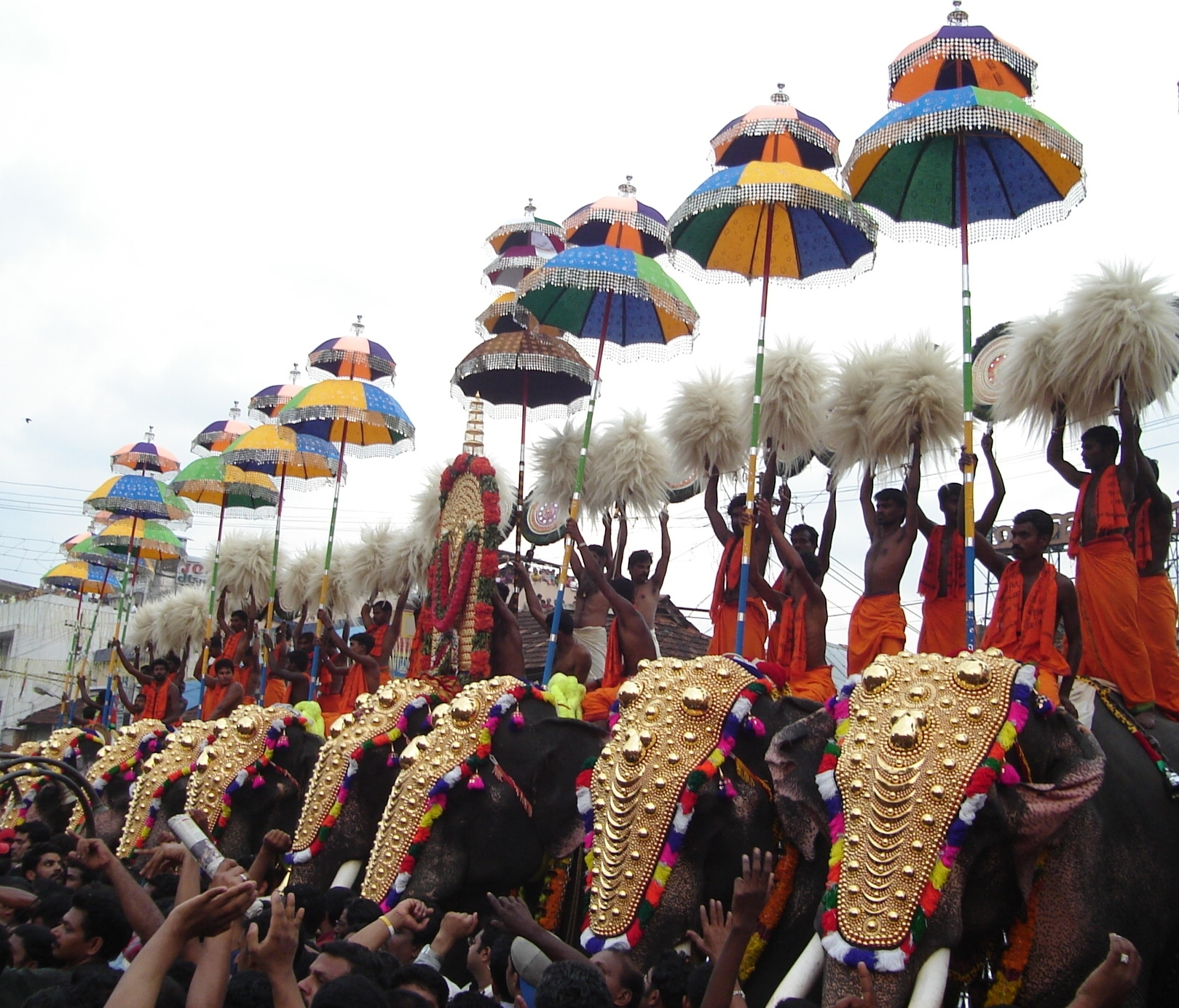
Elephants are featured during the Thrissur pooram festival in Kerala state of south India.

Many prominent temples in Kerala own elephants, many of which are donated by devotees. Elephants are a core part of ritual worship in the famous Guruvayur temple which owns more than 60 elephants. Punnattur Kotta, 3 km from the Guruvayur temple, houses the temple's elephants. A famous elephant, named Guruvayur Kesavan, belonged to this temple. Elephants carry the deity during annual festival processions and ceremonial circumambulations in the Hindu temples. The temple elephants are decorated with gold plated caparisons ("nettipattam"), bells, and necklaces. People mounted on the elephants hold tinselled silk parasols ("muttukuda") up high, swaying white tufts ("vencamaram") and peacock feather fans ("alavattam") to the rhythm of the orchestra. Seventeen elephants are engaged for the daily ceremonial rounds to the accomplishment of Pancari Melam in Kudalmanikyam temple.

Pattambi Nercha is an annual feast conducted by the Pattambi Mosque in Palakkad district, where caparisoned elephants join the procession to the accompaniment of tableaus and traditional orchestras like the Panchavadyam and Thayambaka.

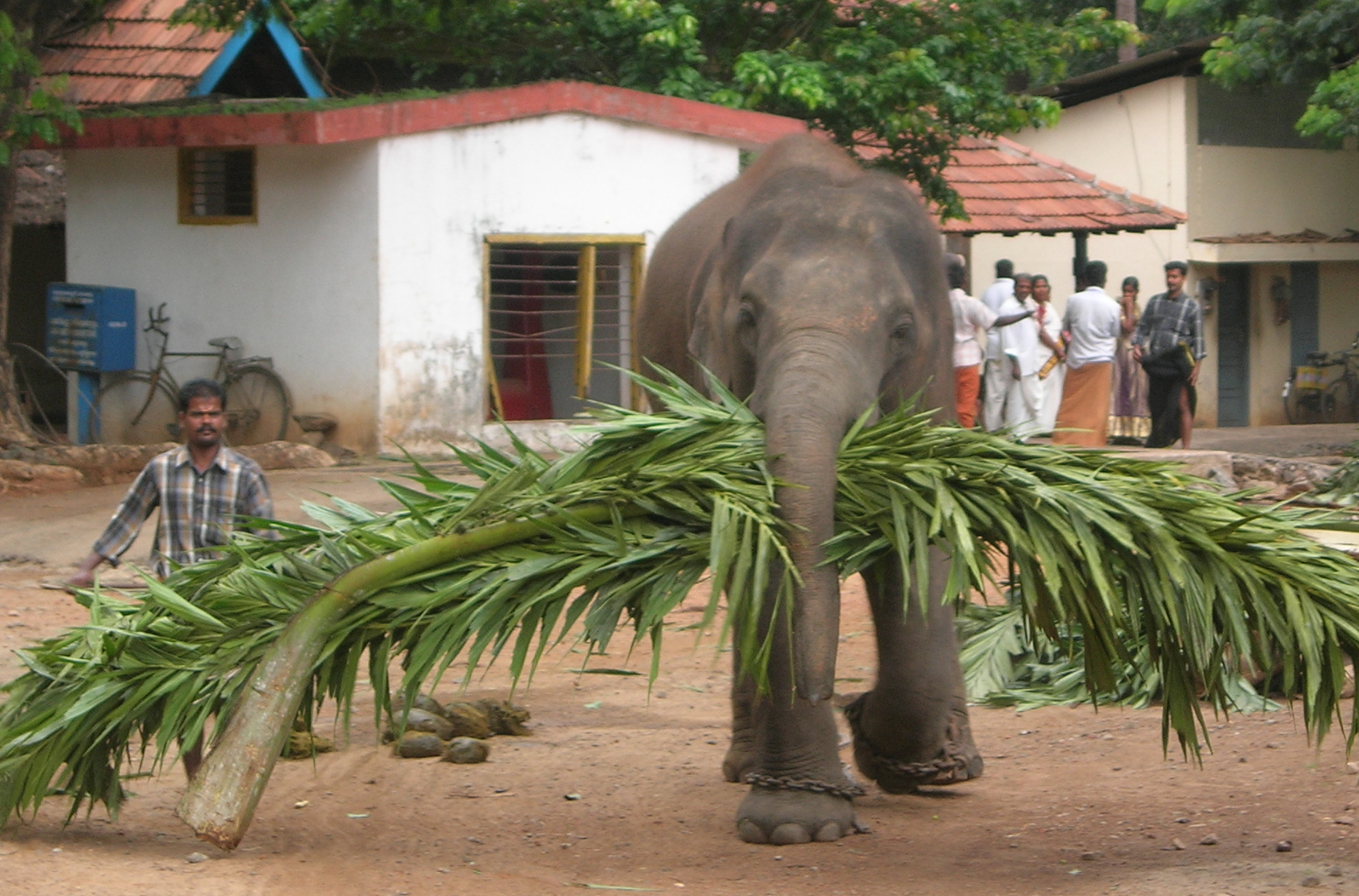
Mahout and his elephant Guruvayoor, Thrissur, Kerala

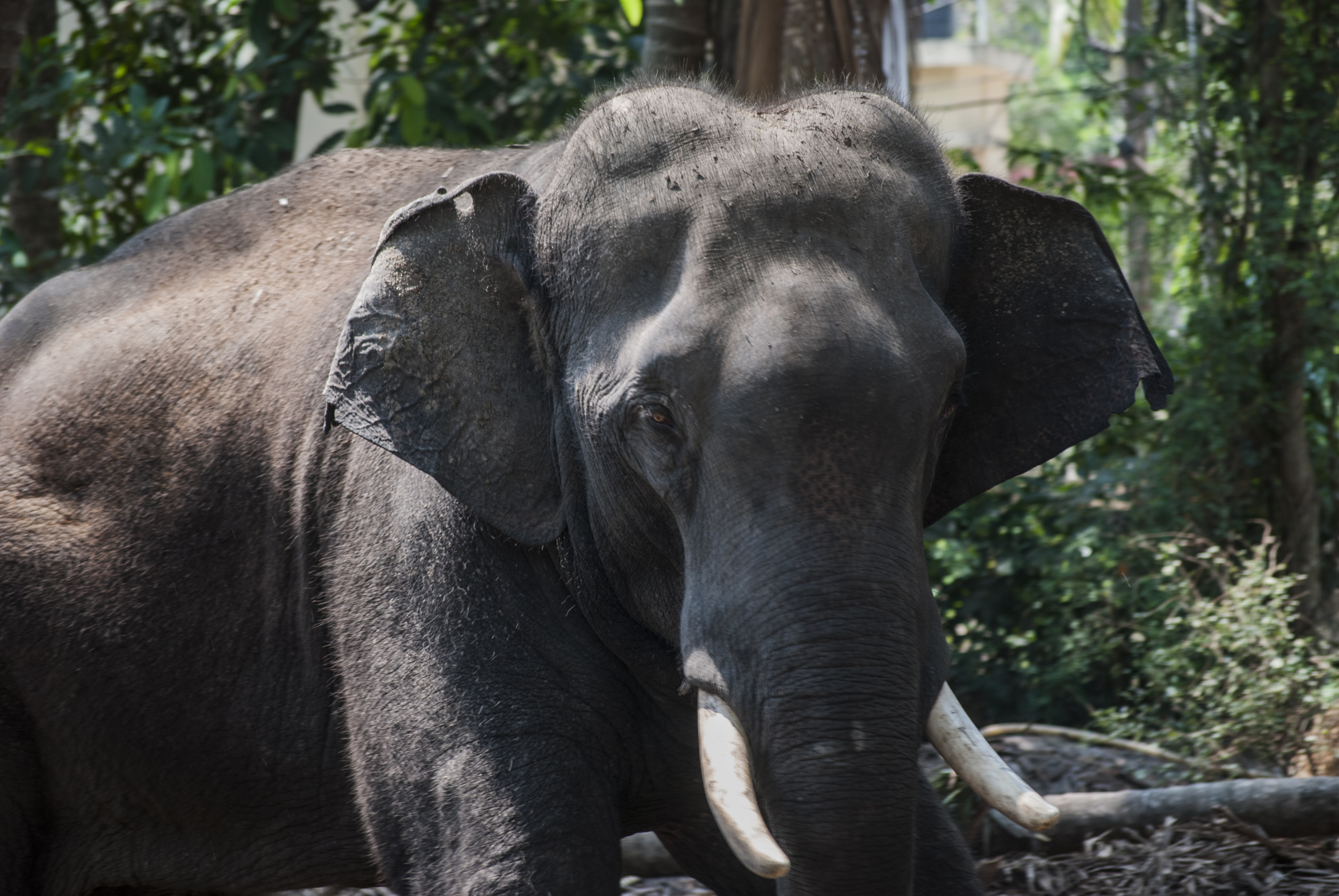
Closeup of a captive Asian Elephant, Guruvayoor, Thrissur, Kerala

== Elephants in history and legends of Kerala ==
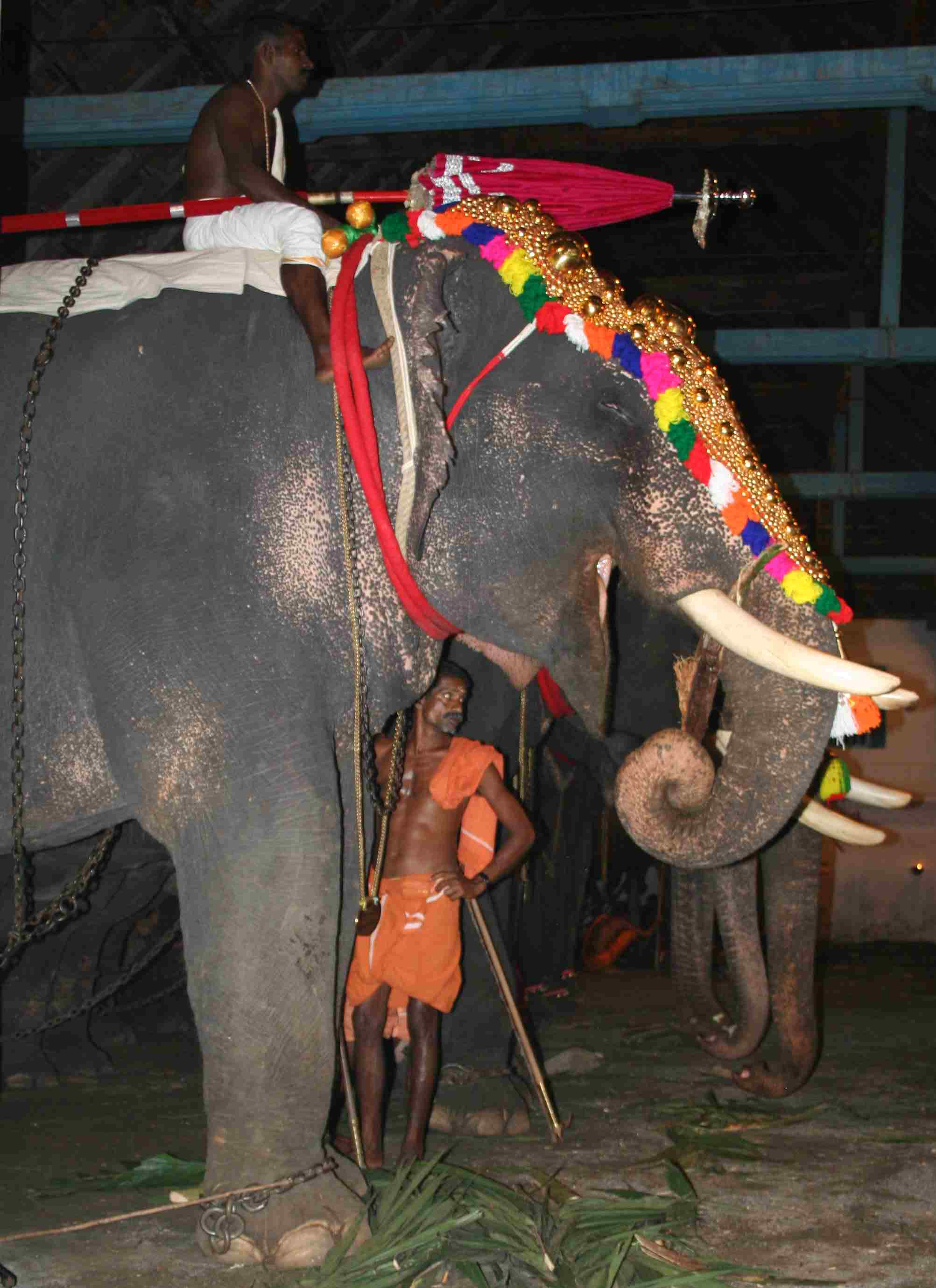
Caparisoned elephants during Sree Poornathrayesa temple festival.

Many elephants are featured in the local legends of Kerala. Aitihyamala ("A Garland of Historical Anecdotes") by Kottarathil Sankunni was written in eight volumes; each volume ending with a story or legend about a famous elephant.

== Elephant care ==
Each elephant has three mahouts, called paappan in the Malayalam language. The most important duty of the mahouts is to bathe and massage the elephant with small rocks, and the husk of coconuts. In the monsoon season, the elephants undergo Ayurvedic rejuvenation treatments which include decoctions with herbs, etc.

In November 2014, Mathrubhumi reported the incident of a tamed elephant, Indrajit, being released to the wild. To avoid the troubles a tamed elephant may face in the wild, special arrangements were made by the forest-wildlife departments of the Government of Kerala, to ensure a smooth transition. The elephant is 15 years old and is expected to live for another 50 years. Elephants have huge market value in a state like Kerala.

== Accusations of cruelty towards elephants ==
Around 700 elephants are owned by people and temples. These elephants are rented out for more than 10,000 festivals and processions in which a single elephant may generate revenue up to $5000 a day. These animals have to endure long parades, firecrackers, may need to stand near flames, travel long distances in open vehicles and walk on roads in the scorching sun for hours, giving them less food, water and sleep.

Biologist V. Sridhar accuses temple boards of greed and coercing aggressive elephants unsuited to such tasks by going to the extent of hobbling them even with spike chains on their forelegs. He further claims that due to the increasing work load, elephants in their prime (20–40 years of age) seem to be dying prematurely. He suspects that increase in death toll - due to intestinal obstruction and other digestive problems - is indicative of potential increase in physiological and psychological stress. There have been reports by three official committees that investigated the abuse of elephants at Guruvayur, and which have detailed the abuses inflicted on the Temple Elephants, in violation of various animal welfare laws in India.

A related disciplinary practice known as ketti azhikkal ("chaining and unchaining") involves chaining an elephant's four legs to trees or posts and beating it with rods, sticks, and hooks, historically to reassert control over a bull elephant emerging from musth or to transfer its obedience to a new mahout; elephants subjected to the practice have reportedly died of the resulting injuries. In November 2024, acting on a suo motu public interest litigation regarding the treatment of captive elephants in the state, the Kerala High Court issued extensive directions for their protection, describing the life of a captive elephant in Kerala as an "Eternal Treblinka".

Elephants that run amok during festivals are a recurring hazard, having caused bystander and mahout deaths at events such as a 2018 incident that injured 15 people and a temple festival at Koyilandi in Kozhikode district that killed three people and injured around 30. To restrain elephants that turn violent, mahouts have used a remote-controlled 'capture belt', a device invented in 2009 as a purportedly more humane alternative to tranquilliser darts, which carry a risk of fatal overdose when handlers panic and fire multiple shots; the device binds an elephant's hind legs together using a nylon strap released from a fibreglass unit strapped to one leg. In its November 2024 directions on captive elephant welfare, the Kerala High Court explicitly prohibited the use of "capture belts or other crude and inhuman methods" to restrain elephants that misbehave or run amok, as part of a wider ruling that found the state government had persistently failed to enforce the Supreme Court's earlier 2016 directions on the issue.

On 8 April 2021, the death of Ambalappuzha Vijayakrishan sparked a controversy in Kerala. The elephant lovers accused Devaswom Board and its mahout for killing the elephant. According to them, for several months prior to his death, the elephant were tortured by its mahouts and was used by the board for parading in spite of him having severe injuries.

== Elephant ornamentation ==
One of the famous families in Thrissur District of Kerala, the Venkitadri family, has made ornaments for three generations, especially for the famous Thrissur pooram, the most famous of the Hindu temple-centred festivals. They make gold plated caparisons, umbrellas, alavattam, venchamaram, and necklaces. They decorate 150 elephants with ornaments for temple festivals. Thrissur Pooram, Nenmara Vallangi Vela are some of the famous festivals in Kerala in which more decorated elephants are used for procession.

== Elephant Conservation in Kerala ==
Kottur Elephant Sanctuary and Rehabilitation Centre in the Thiruvananthapuram district is the India's first and world's largest elephant rehabilation centre, opened with an aim to protect and rehabilititate elephants. Other elephant care centers in the state includes Kodanad Abhayaranyam animal shelter and elephant training centre and Elephant Training Center, Konni.

== Elephant Survey in Kerala ==
Kerala Forest and Wildlife Department has conducted a statewide census in Kerala in November 2018, necessitated by an order issued by the Supreme Court. In this survey, over 5706 elephants were counted. Thrissur recorded the highest number of elephants (145) and Kannur has the lowest elephant population (3). Kasaragod has no elephants.

== See also ==
- Cultural depictions of elephants
- Thrissur Pooram
- Kottur Elephant Sanctuary and Rehabilation Centre
- Elephant Training Center, Konni
- Kodanad Abhayaranyam animal shelter and elephant training centre
- Temples of Kerala
- Human-elephant conflict in Kerala
