= Kodanad =

Town in Keralam, India

- Village
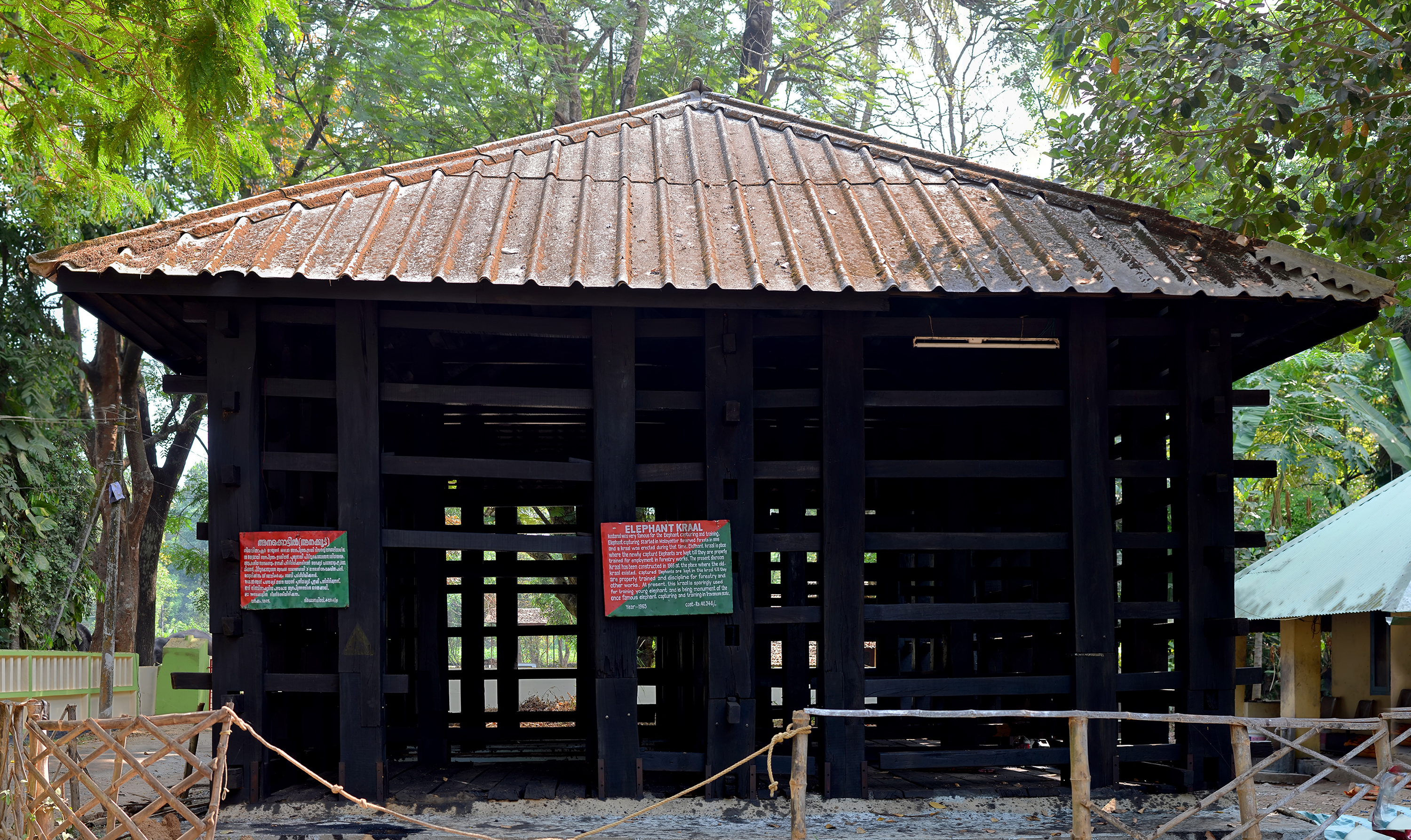
- Elephant Kraal at Kodanad

- Location in Perumbavoor, Kerala, India Kodanad (India)
- Coordinates: 10.18°N 76.51°E
- Country: India
- State: Kerala
- District: Ernakulam

Population (2011)
  - Total: 14,244

Languages
  - Official: Malayalam, English
- Time zone: UTC+5:30 (IST)
- PIN: 683544
- Telephone code: 0484
- Vehicle registration: KL-40
- 2011 census code: 627941
- Nearest city: Cochin

Kodanad is a rural riverside village of Perumbavoor, Ernakulam district in Keralam, South India. It is 18 km from Angamaly. Kodanad is situated on the south bank of Periyar river, about 42 kilometers east of Kochi. The village is a major tourist destination because it houses an Elephant training center.

== Transportation ==
Kodanad has got private bus services to places inside and outside Ernakulam District and run into several neighbouring towns. There are frequent bus services to Perumbavoor from here. AutoRickshaws are commonly used for small distances. The nearest railway stations are Angamaly and Aluva. The Cochin International Airport at Nedumbassery is only 16 km from the Kodanad Elephant training centre. KL-40 is the RTO code for Kunnathunad Taluk and Perumbavoor. Perumbavoor JRTO is at Pattal.

Kodanad is surrounded by many small but populous commuter villages, notably Koovappady, Thottuva, Alattuchira, Panamkuzhy, Cheranalloor, Kurichilakode, Kaprikad, etc. Vallam town, is one of the main interchange points for public transport.

The nearest airport is Cochin International Airport which is about 20 km (12 mi) by road.

== History ==
In the 1950–60s, Kodanad used to be the largest of several elephant training centres for captured elephants from the adjoining forest regions. They were trained using Mahouts, specially skilled people also known as 'Paappaan' in Malayalam language. In the 1970s, there was a ban to elephant capture by Government of India and from then on, Kodanad was primarily used as a rescue training centre. As of 2017, all the animals have been shifted to nearby Abhayaranyam facility.

== Demographics ==
According to the 2011 census of India, Kodanad has 3502 households. The literacy rate of the village is 84.63%.

Demographics (2011 Census)
	Total	Male	Female
Population	14244	7036	7208
Children aged below 6 years	1284	655	629
Scheduled caste	2066	1005	1061
Scheduled tribe	106	53	53
Literates	12054	6090	5964
Workers (all)	5842	4052	1790
Main workers (total)	4297	3251	1046
Main workers: Cultivators	397	352	45
Main workers: Agricultural labourers	618	403	215
Main workers: Household industry workers	92	72	20
Main workers: Other	3190	2424	766
Marginal workers (total)	1545	801	744
Marginal workers: Cultivators	116	78	38
Marginal workers: Agricultural labourers	484	232	252
Marginal workers: Household industry workers	114	42	72
Marginal workers: Others	831	449	382
Non-workers	8402	2984	5418

== Kaprikkad Ecotourism project ==
Kodanad is in the list of Ecotourism destination projects sponsored by the Government of India. As a part of this project, Kaprikkad, a village lying 3 km adjacent to Kodanad on the river bank has been set up in 2006 for entertaining visitors in the most natural and environmental friendly way.

== Abhayaranyam Mini Zoo, Kaprikkad ==
Most of the animals from Kodanad elephant centre including the elephants have been recently rehabilitated to Kaprikkad, as the part of Ecotourism project named as Abhayaranyam, which is spread across 200 acres of natural forest. The project was inaugurated on 18 February 2011 by the Minister of Forestry and Housing, Shri. Binoy Vishwom. You can find Spotted deer, Sambar deer and young elephants here. Abhayaranyam extends for an area of 2.5 acres on the bank river of river periyar .

== Education ==
Baselius Augen Public School, Kodanad Mar Augen higher secondary school, Kodanad

== Places of worship ==
Temples

- kodanad shiva temple,
- chettinada saraswathi temple,
- kunnumpuram ayyappa temple,
- edavanakavu temple,
- pancheswara Vishnu temple.

Churches

- Mar Malkhe Orthodox Church, Kodanad.
- Zion Asram, Kodanad
- St. Antony's Syro-Malabar Church, Kodanad
- St. Thomas Church, Malayatoor (2 km)
- Bethlehem St. Marys Jacobite Syrian Orthodox Church, Alattuchira

== Nearby places ==
- Malayattoor Pilgrim 3 km
- Kaprikad 3 km
- Paniyeli poru 15 km
- Airport 16 km
- Angamaly 19 km
- Muvattupuzha 21 km
- Varapuzha (Paravur) 33 km
- Piravom 34 km
- North Paravur 36 km
- Kochi City 38 km
- Poochackal പൂച്ചാക്കല് 43 km
- Aroor 43 km
- Kodungallur 50 km
- Perumbavoor 11 km
