= Ketti Azhikkal =

Elephant subjugation practice in Kerala, India

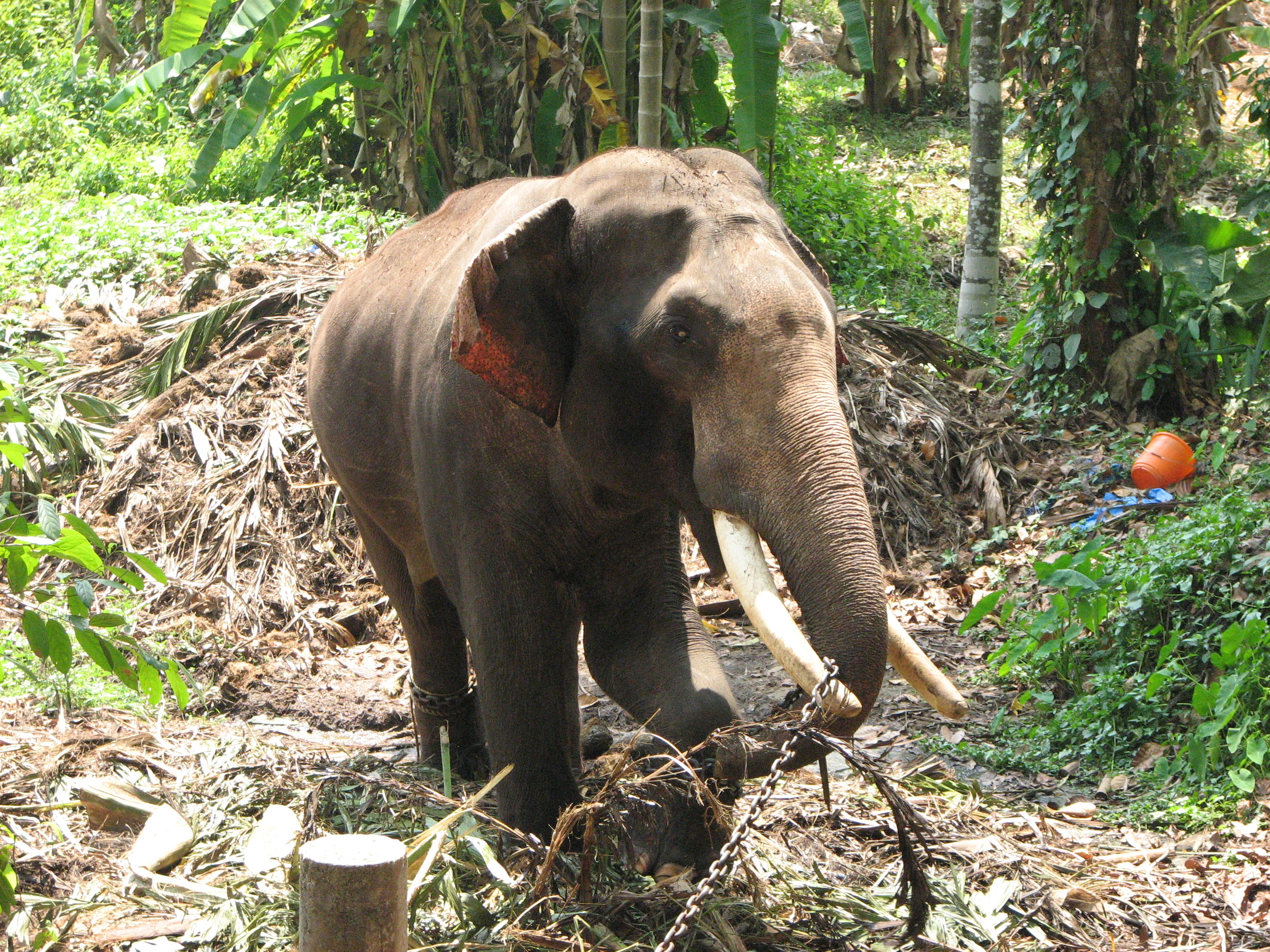
An elephant in musth attempting to break its chain at a temple in Kerala

Ketti azhikkal (കെട്ടിയഴിക്കൽ) is a practice in the Indian state of Kerala used to physically subdue captive elephants, especially temple elephants, typically to reassert a mahout's or owner's control over the animal. It has been documented by journalists and animal-welfare researchers as a form of animal cruelty.

== Etymology ==
In Malayalam, ketti means "chaining" or "tying" and azhikkal means "releasing" or "untying" — the term names the two bracketing acts of the process while remaining silent about what happens in between.

== Practice ==
During ketti azhikkal, an elephant's four legs are chained to trees or posts and the animal is beaten using rods, sticks, and hooks, sometimes by multiple mahouts or hired men who join in while drunk. The practice has historically been used to regain control over a bull elephant emerging from musth, a periodic condition marked by a sharp rise in testosterone and increased aggression and unpredictability; Onmanorama reported an increase of "over 60%," while Gulf News reported levels rising to as much as 60 times normal. Elephants subjected to the practice are sometimes killed or fatally injured by it; others go on to die of conditions including tuberculosis, septicaemia, and impaction from digestive complications. It has also been used to transfer an elephant's obedience to a new mahout.

A related disciplinary practice, vaatal, involves the deliberate denial of food or water to a chained elephant.

== Context ==
Kerala has several hundred captive elephants, most owned by temples or private individuals and used chiefly in religious festivals. Journalists and researchers have distinguished the periodic, adult-focused subjugation practices used in Kerala from the initial taming methods applied to newly wild-caught juvenile elephants elsewhere in Asia, such as the caged "crush" method historically used in Thailand and Myanmar (see Elephant crushing). A 2017 study cited in Kerala press coverage found captive elephants in the state chained for 18 to 22 hours a day.

== Legal status and enforcement ==
Physical abuse of captive elephants is prohibited under the Prevention of Cruelty to Animals Act, 1960 and regulated under the Kerala Captive Elephants (Management and Maintenance) Rules, 2012, which followed earlier 2003 rules. In Wildlife Rescue & Rehabilitation Centre v. Union of India, (2016) 1 SCC 716, the Supreme Court of India issued directions intended to prevent cruelty to captive elephants paraded at festivals. In November 2024, the Kerala High Court, acting on a suo motu public interest litigation regarding captive elephants, found the state government had failed to implement the Supreme Court's directions and issued further detailed orders, describing the life of a captive elephant in the state as an "Eternal Treblinka". The court noted that nearly a third of the state's recorded captive elephants had died between 2018 and 2024.

== Documentation and controversy ==
Animal-welfare activists and journalists who document mistreatment of captive elephants, including practices such as ketti azhikkal, have reported facing intimidation, harassment, and physical assault from mahouts, elephant owners, and their supporters, some of whom describe themselves as aanapremis ("elephant-lovers"). Reported incidents include a 2022 assault in which a bystander photographing an elephant's treatment was attacked with a knife after his photograph was circulated on social media.

== See also ==
- Elephant crushing
- Mahout
- Musth
- Wildlife Protection Act, 1972
- Animal welfare in India
