= Elephant Training Center, Konni =

Elephant training center in Kerala, India

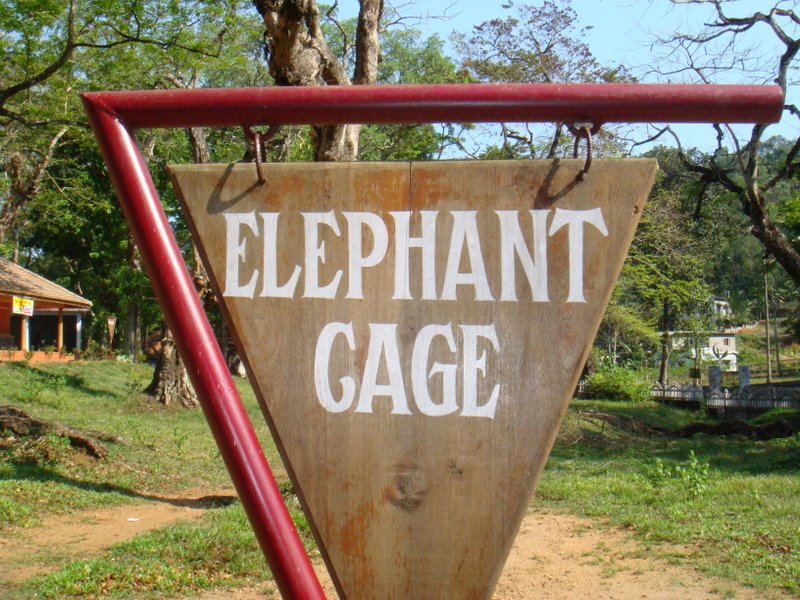
- Welcome board to Konni elephant training center

- Location within Kerala

General information
- Location: Pathanamthitta, Konni, India
- Coordinates: 9.2410383°N 76.8783975°E
- Construction started: 1942

Height
- Height: 12.65

Technical details
- Material: Hopea ponga

Konni Aanakkoodu located in Konni is a well known training center for elephants in Kerala. It is 11 km from Pathanamthitta town.

== Anakkoodu (Cage) ==
The prime attraction here are the huge cages of wood built to house elephants. These cages are locally known as Aanakkoodu and can accommodate 3 to 4 elephants at a time.

== Training process ==
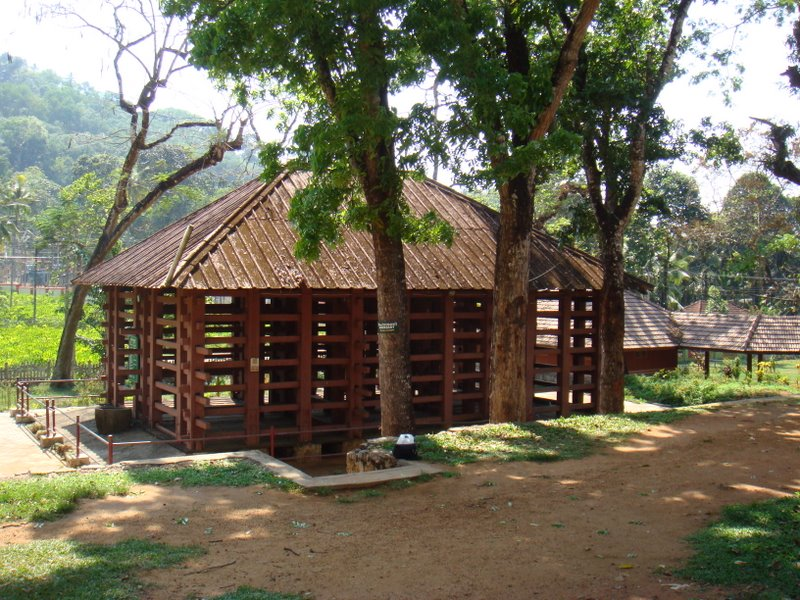
The Old Training Cage

The trainers here train the baby elephants which get separated from their herd, or are found wounded or roaming in the forest. Experienced trainers, using their systematic training methods, tame the baby elephants.

== Visitor access ==
Visitors can get a close look at these elephants and can observe and understand a lot about their behaviour, especially that of baby elephants.

== Older practice ==
Konni is famous for the elephant training centre since ancient times. The elephants were captured from the dense forests of the western ghats/Sahyadri and brought to the elephant training cage at Konni. There these wild elephants are tamed and trained by mahouts specialized as elephant trainers. These trainers take the help of other tamed elephants.

== Elephants in Konni ==
There are five elephants at present in Konni Elephant Training Center. Krishna is the youngest member who is only nine years old.

- Priyadarshini
- Meena
- Surendran (presently at TN for kumki elephant training)
- Eva
- Krishna.

== Early history ==
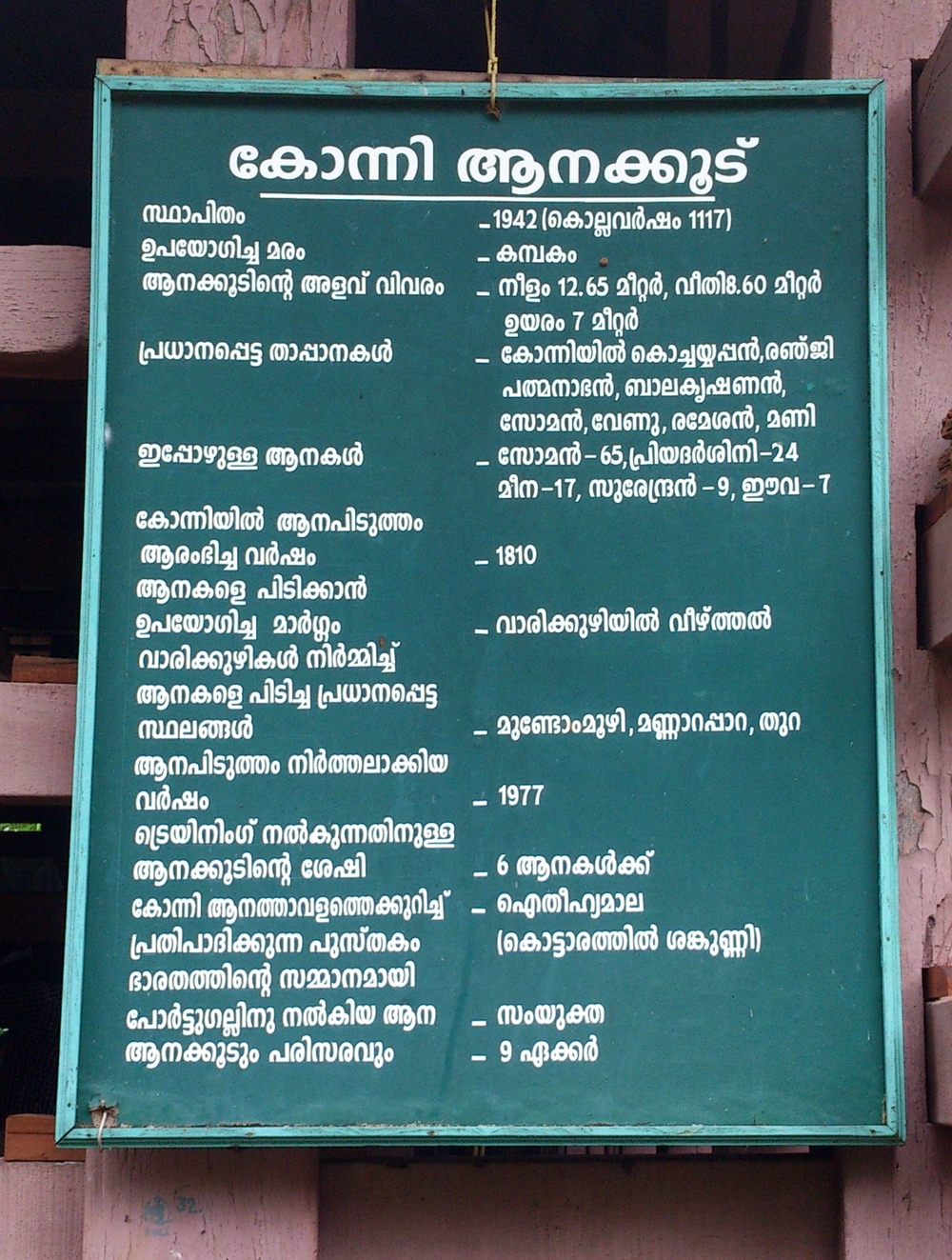
Konni Elephant Cage details board on display

The elephant capturing at Konni traces back to 1810 AD. The major elephant capturing locations include Mundom Moozhy, Mannarappara and Thura. The elephant training cage which is present now was built in 1942. The wood of "Kambakam" (Hopea ponga) was used for this. The present training cage has the capacity to train 6 elephants. The dimensions of the training cage are 12.65×8.60×7 metres. The elephant training cage and its premises comprises 9 acres (36,000 m^{2}) of land. The elephant capturing was officially stopped in 1977 by Govt: Circular though it was actually stopped many years prior to that.

== Tourism ==
Presently the elephant training cage is a major tourist attraction.

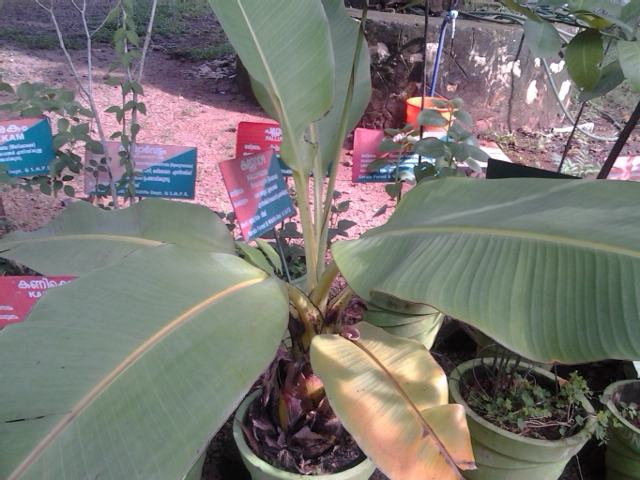
A medicinal Banana Plantain in Konni Elephant Cage

It houses a history museum as well. The elephant training centre functions as an elephant welfare centre. The elephant calves estranged from the herd and found lost in the forest are brought here and are provided with medical facilities and proper care. Medicinal plants are also grown here and there is an Eco-Store to buy medicinal and forest based natural goods.

== Documentation ==
The details of Konni Elephant Training Centre and Training Cage are mentioned in the articles of the famous Aithihyamaala by Shri Kottarathil Shankunni. "Aithihyamaala" is referred as one of rare collection of articles of Kerala History.

== Gift to Portugal ==
Konni Elephant Training Centre has to its credit of gifting the Elephant Samyuktha to the Republic of Portugal as a mark of friendship and co-operation with the Republic of India.

== How to reach ==
Konni is on the Main Eastern Highway (Punalur-Pathanamthitta-Muvattupuzha Highway/SH-08) and is very well connected to major towns and cities of Kerala through Pathanamthitta.

Railway

The nearest Railway station is punalur, 25 km and Chengannur Thiruvalla which is around 41 km.kottayam60.

Airport

The nearest Airport is Thiruvananthapuram International Airport, about 99 km from Pathanamthitta. The Cochin International Airport is around 124 km from Konni.

== Image Gallery ==
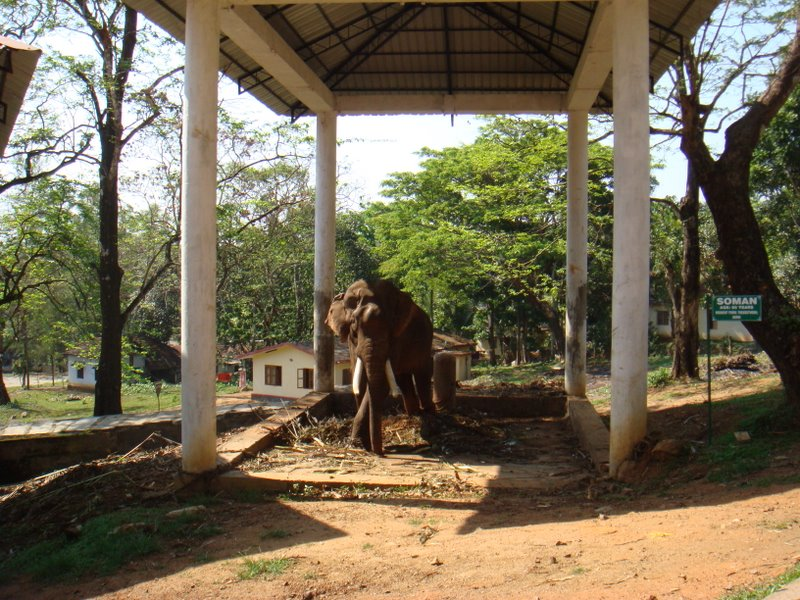
The elephant Soman

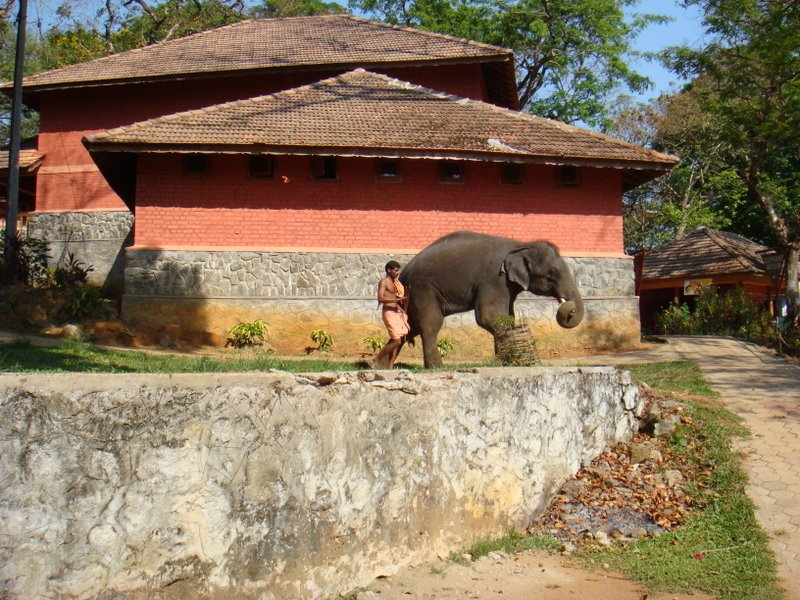
A young calf with a mahout

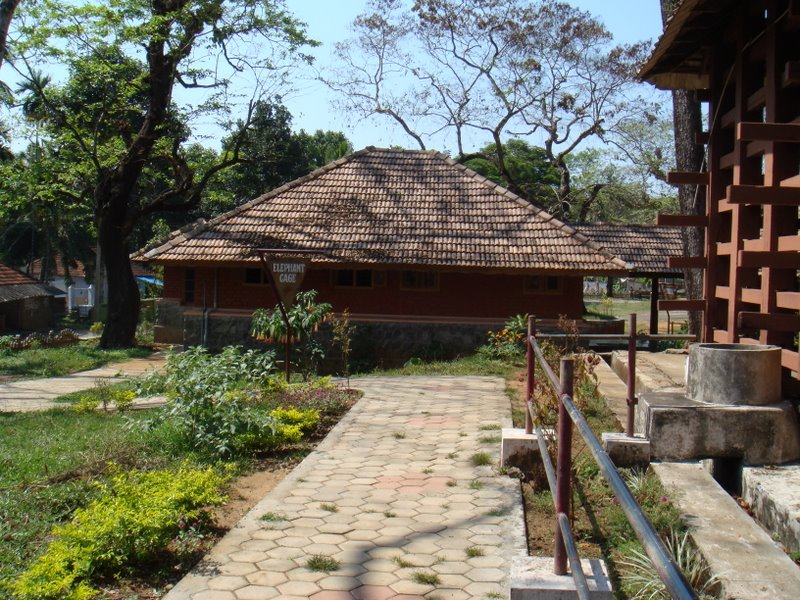
A view of the premises

== See also ==
- Kodanad Abhayaranyam animal shelter and elephant training centre
- Kottur Elephant Sanctuary and Rehabilation Centre
