= Punnathurkotta =

- Place of interest
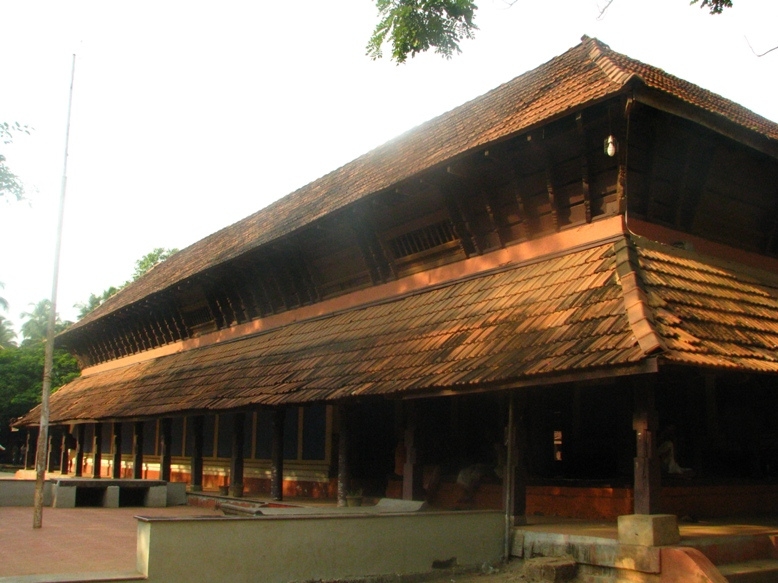
- Punathur Palace
- Nickname: Anakotta
- Location in Kerala, India
- Coordinates: 10°36′51″N 76°1′47″E
- Country: India
- State: Kerala
- District: Thrissur

Languages
  - Official: Malayalam, English
- Time zone: UTC+5:30 (IST)
- Telephone code: 91487
- Vehicle registration: KL-46
- Nearest city: Guruvayur

Punnathurkotta is a fort and former palace located in Kottapadi, about 3 km from the Guruvayoor Sree Krishna Temple, in Thrissur District of Kerala State in South India.

== Description ==
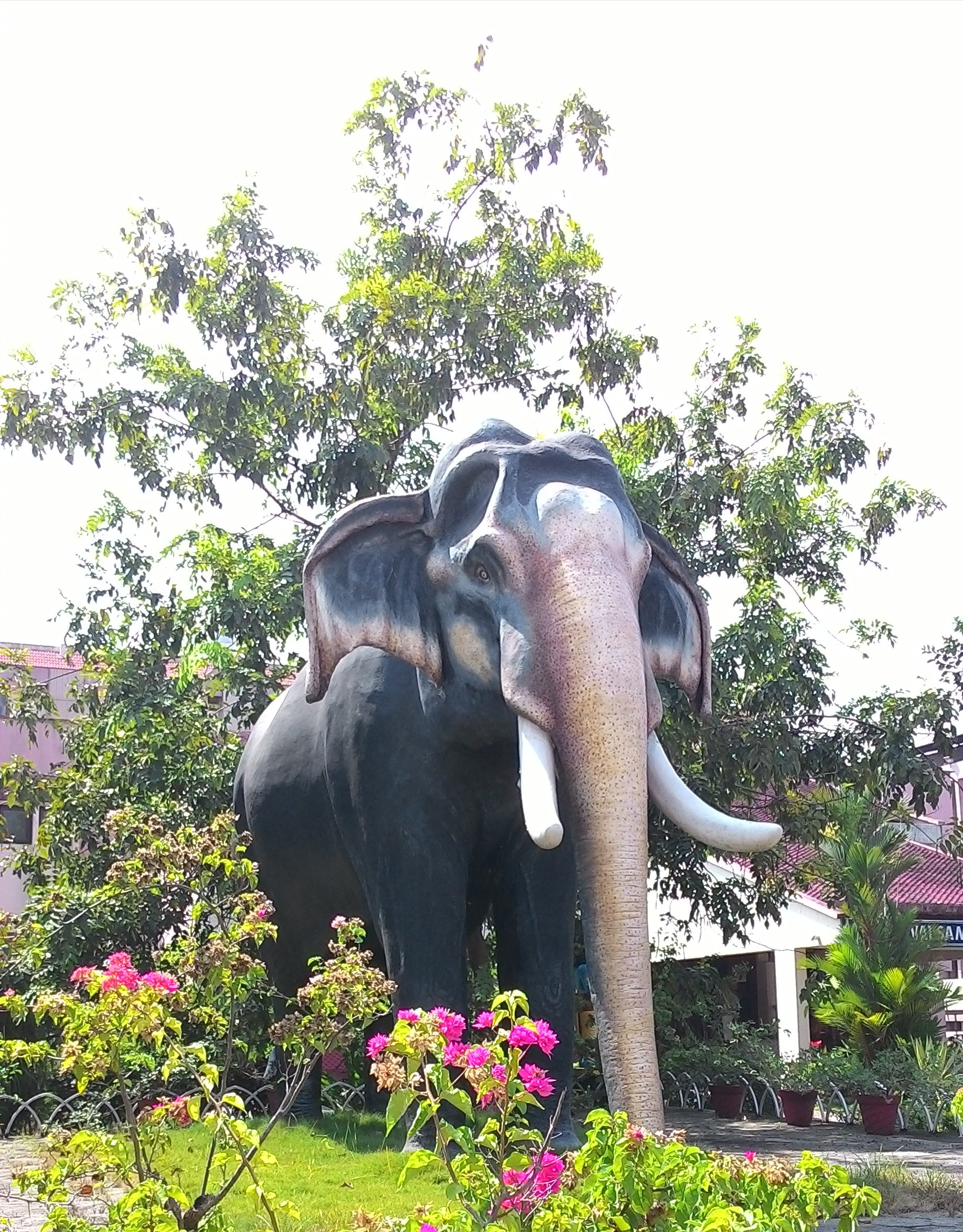
The statue of Guruvayur Keshavan placed at Guruvayur Temple premise

Punnathurkotta was once the palace of a local ruler His Highness Anujan Raja, now survived by his son R Unnikrishnan, daughter-in-law Nirmala Menon, grandsons Madhusudana R Menon & Madhava R Menon, but the palace grounds are now used to house the elephants belonging to the Guruvayoor temple, and has been renamed Anakkotta (meaning "Elephant Fort"). There were 86 elephants housed there, but currently there are about 37 elephants. The elephants are ritual offerings made by the devotees of Lord Guruvayurappa.

Described as a 'Palace for Elephants,' this facility is also used to train the elephants to serve Lord Krishna as well as to participate in many festivals that occur throughout the year. The oldest elephant is around 82 years of age and is called 'Ramachandran'. The rituals of Gajapooja (Worshipping Elephants) and Anayoottu (Feeding Elephants) are observed here, as an offering to Lord Ganesha. The legendary elephant "Guruvayur Keshavan" was housed here.

The compound also has a naalu kettu, a traditional rectangular home with a central courtyard, which belonged to the Punnathur Raja. It presently houses a training school for Papans (Mahout).

This complex also contains a temple dedicated to Lord Shiva and Bhagavathy. Some scenes in the famous Malayalam movie "Oru Vadakkan Veeragatha" (starring Mammooty) were filmed at this location. The visiting hours are 9.00 AM to 5.00 PM. The entry fee is ₹ 20.00 per adult. An extra Rs 25 is charged for to use a camera inside the complex. Nowadays camera usage is not allowed in Punnathurkotta.

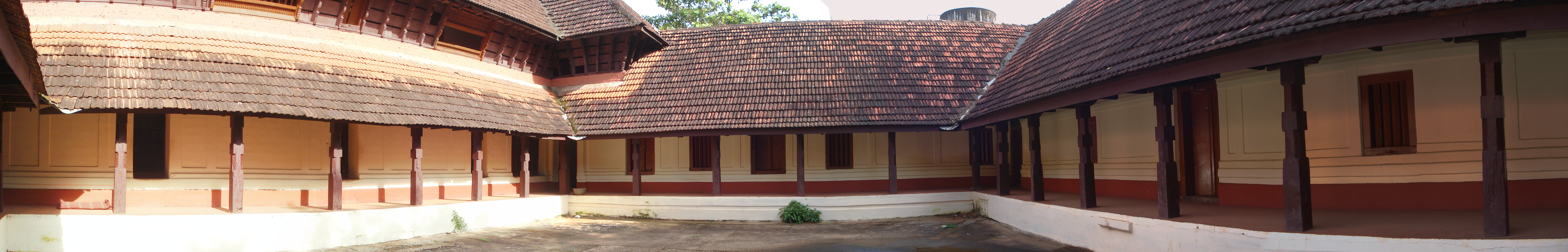
Punnathur Kotta

=== Elephant Camp at Punnathurkotta ===
The Elephant Camp is located in Punnathur Kotta, at a distance of 3 km from the Guruvayur Temple. This Elephant Camp houses 36 elephants in 11.5 acres of land and is home to the largest number of captive elephants. During the month July elephants are given special ayurvedic treatment. But this practice has been criticized by the Animal Welfare Board of India in a study commissioned on the welfare of the elephants. This study also found many glaring issues on the treatment of elephants and suggested remedial measures many of which has not been implemented.

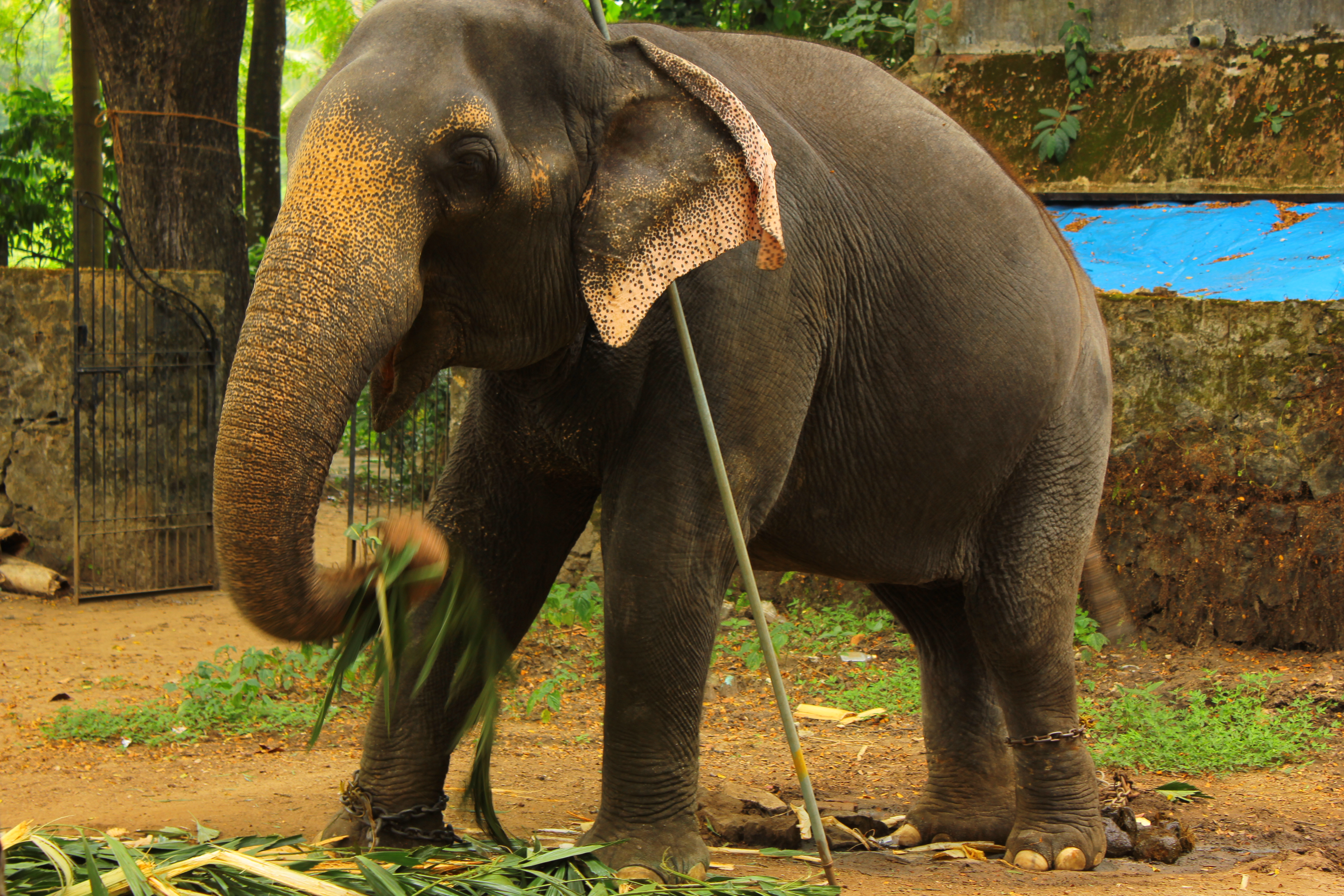
Elephants chained at punnathor kotta

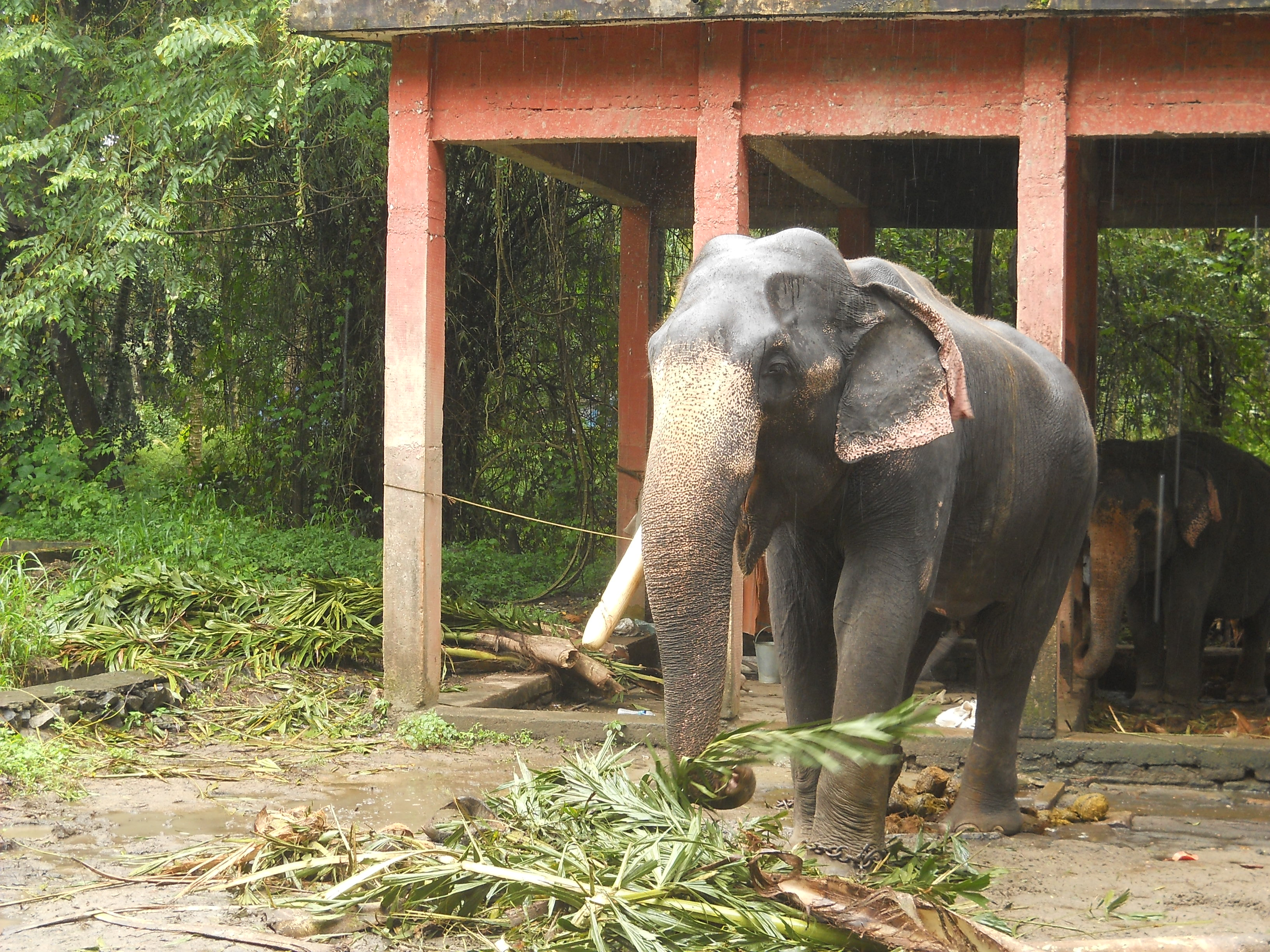
Elephant at Punnathur Kotta, Guruvayur

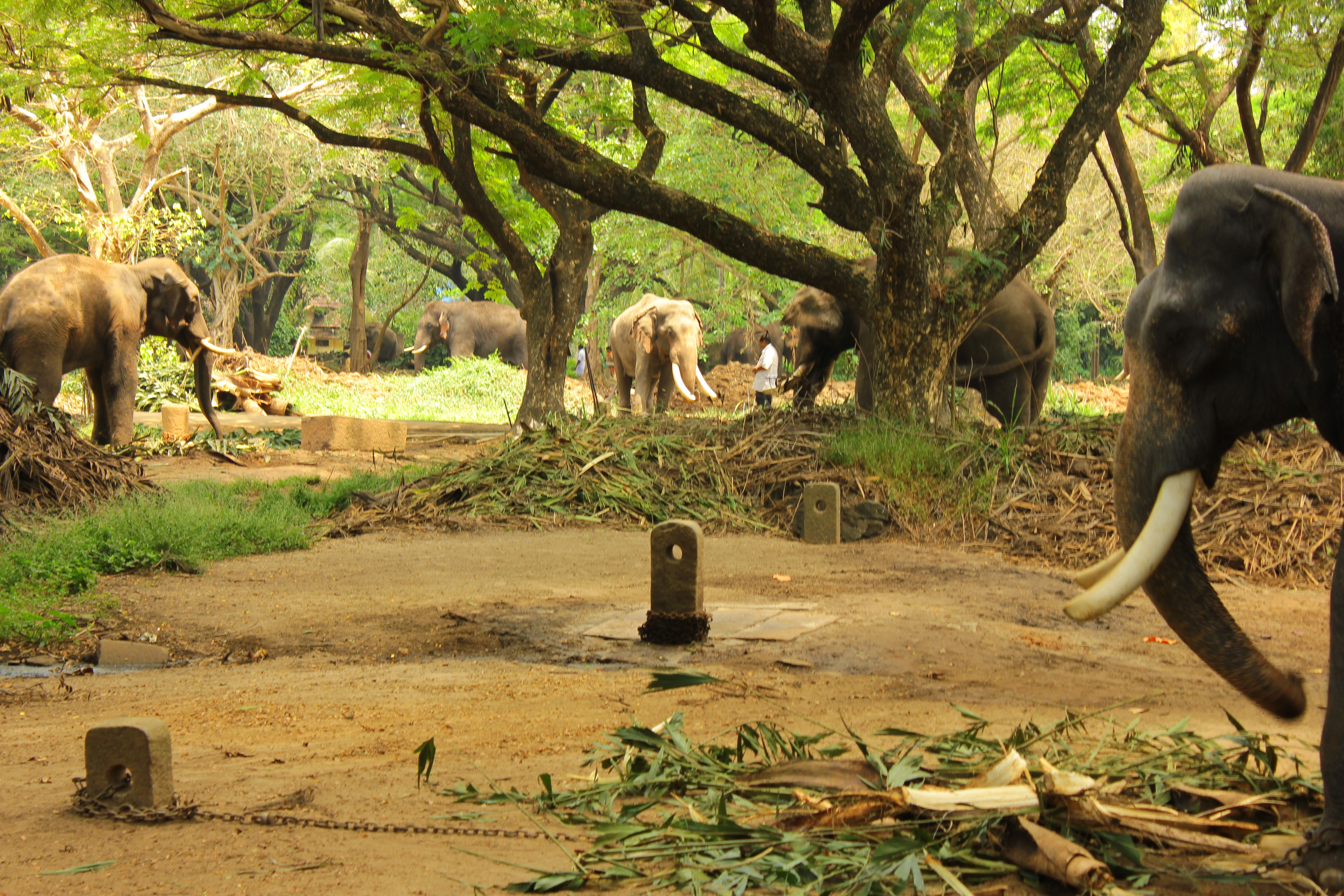
Elephants chained to concrete posts

== See also ==
- Elephants in Kerala culture
- Guruvayur Keshavan
- Guruvayoorappan
- Guruvayoor Temple
- Temple elephant
