= Kottapadi =

- village
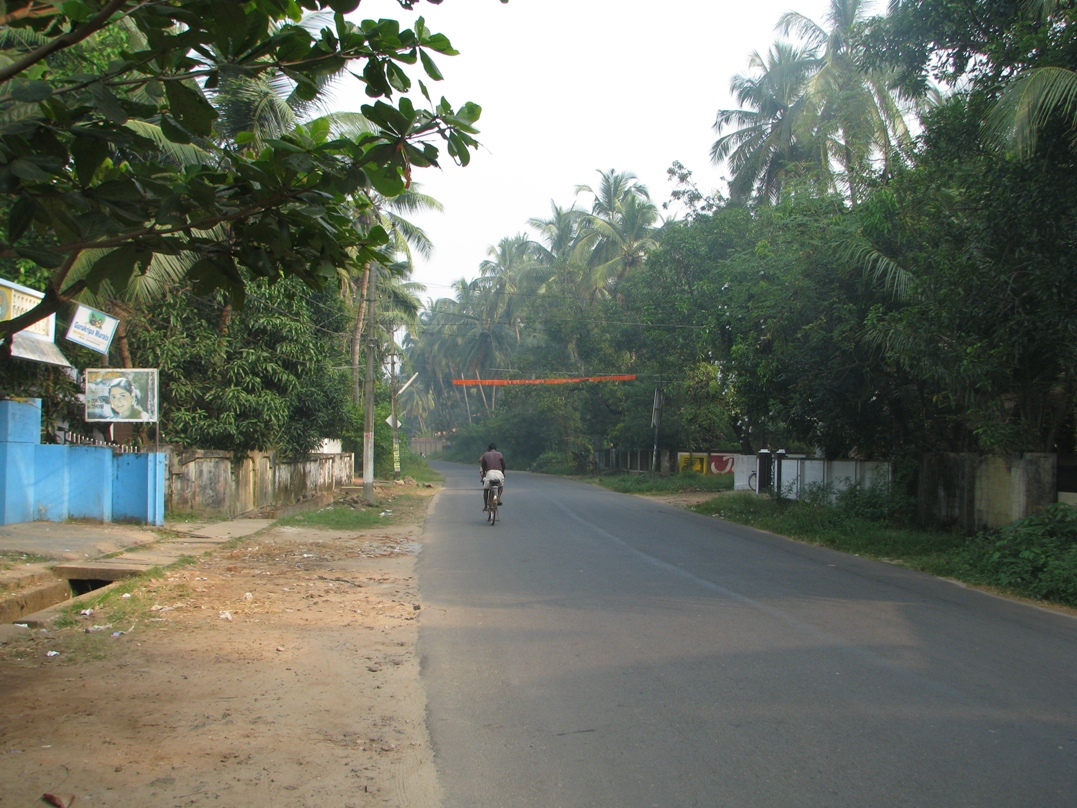
- Interactive map of Kottapadi
- Coordinates: 10°36′54″N 76°1′43″E
- Country: India
- State: Kerala
- District: Thrissur

Government
  - Body: Guruvayur Municipality

Languages
  - Official: Malayalam, English
- Time zone: UTC+5:30 (IST)
- PIN: 680505
- Telephone code: 91487
- Vehicle registration: KL-08/KL-46
- Nearest city: Trichur
- Lok Sabha constituency: Trichur
- Civic agency: Guruvayur Municipality

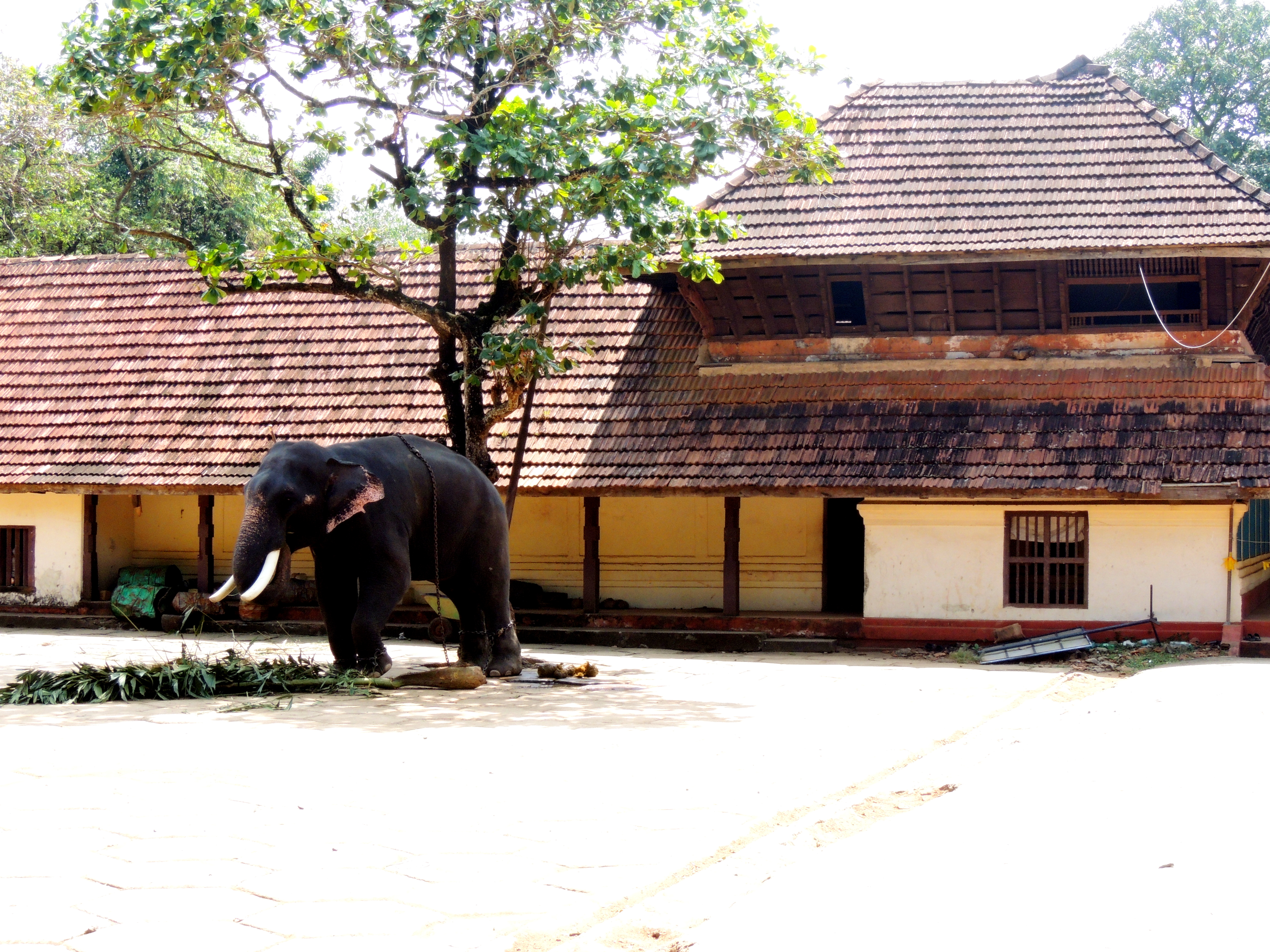
Punnathoor Anakkotta

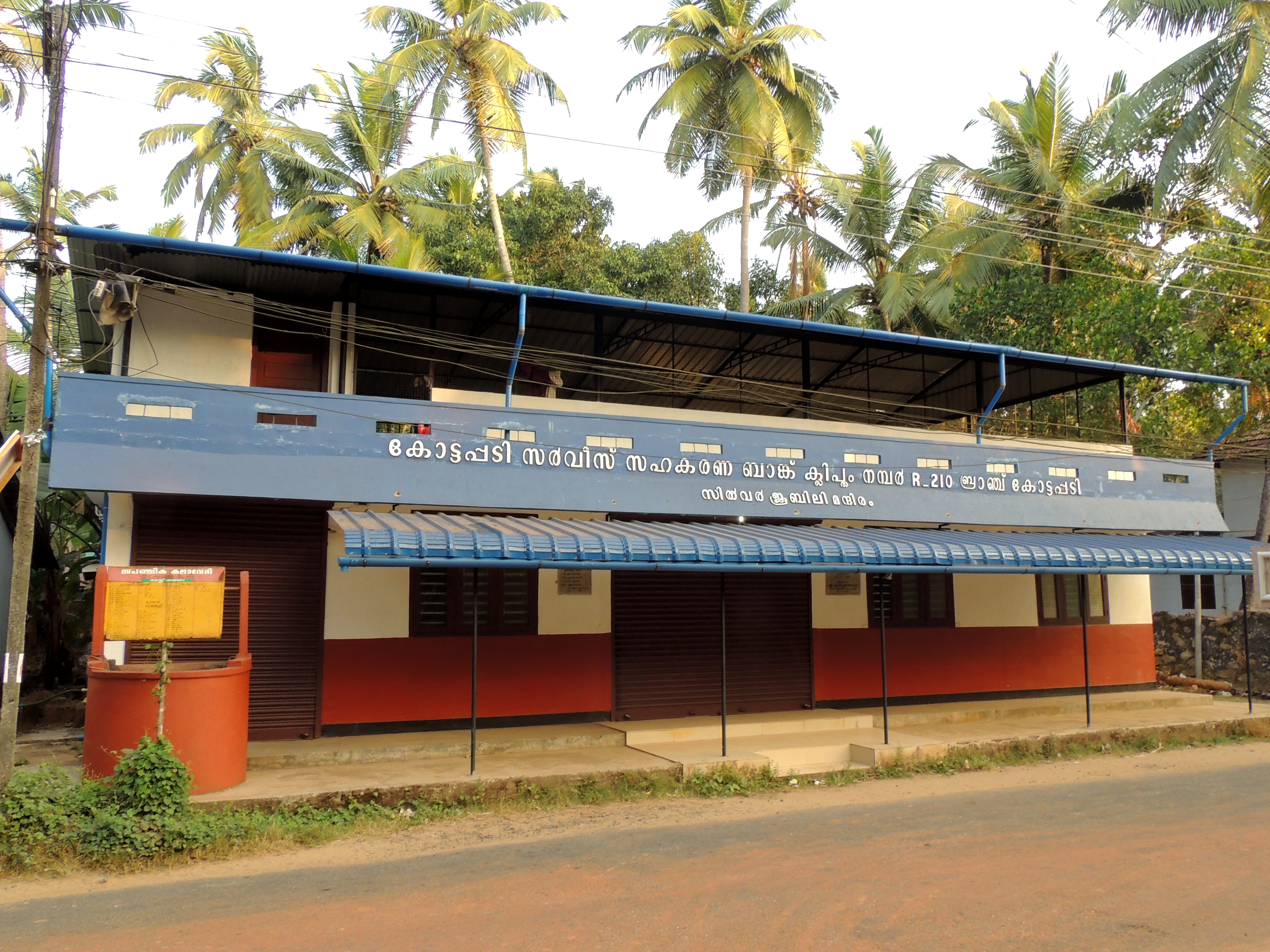
Village bank in Kottapadi

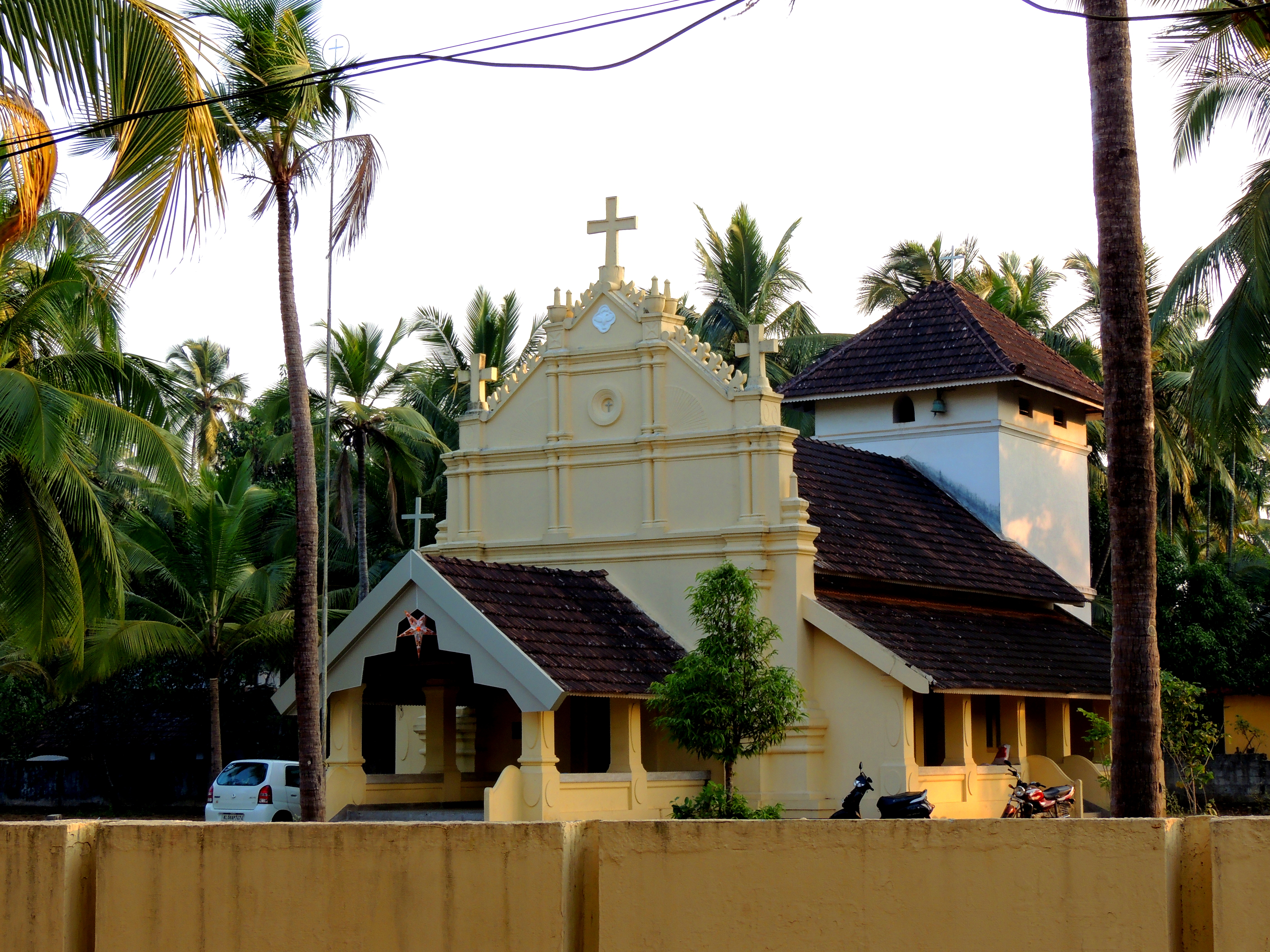
Kottapadi Church

Kottapadi is a village near Guruvayur town in the district of Thrissur, Kerala, South India. Kottapadi literally translates to Gates to Fort. Kottapadi has now gained prominence Punnathurkotta for which it has been named, which used to house elephants belonging to the Guruvayoor temple. (Anakotta in Malayalam, literally translated as "Elephant Fort") Elephants that are an integral part of certain temple rituals are boarded and trained here.

== History ==
Kottapadi was the seat of Punathur Raja who were the vassals of Zamorins. Punathur Raja is reported to have formed around 15th century when it separated from Talappili kingdom and aligned with the Zamorins. The name Kottapadi is derived from (Punnathur Kotta or Punathur Fort) Kotta Fort and Padi Gate. Being a coastal village (6 km from sea) like many other parts of Kerala has white sand and Coconut farming was a major industry and still one can see large swaths of lands with Coconut palms. Due to rapid urbanisation of the Guruvayur area, most of this village has now become a small town. Kottapadi is located only 2 kilometres away from Guruvayur temple. Many tourists come here for visiting the Punnathur Kotta. There are more than 60 elephants here. These elephants belong to the Guruvayur Temple, where prominent devotees offer it to Lord Guruvayurappan. Prominent Shiva temple at Mammiyur is located close by.

Nearest Airport: Cochin International Airport

Nearest Railway Stations: Guruvayur, Trichur

Nearest Major Towns: Guruvayur, Chavakkad, Kunnamkulam

== Colleges in Kottapadi ==
Little Flower women's college, Aryabhatta women's college, Mercy college.

== Temples in Kottapadi ==
- Chembalakulangara Bhagavathi kshethram,
- Sree Subramanya Kshethram,
- Kaveed Karthyani Kshetram,
- Sree Kapaleshwaram Shiva temple.
