= Kodanad Abhayaranyam animal shelter and elephant training centre =

Eco tourism project in Kerala

Abhayaranyam Animal Shelter and Kodanad Elephant Training Centre
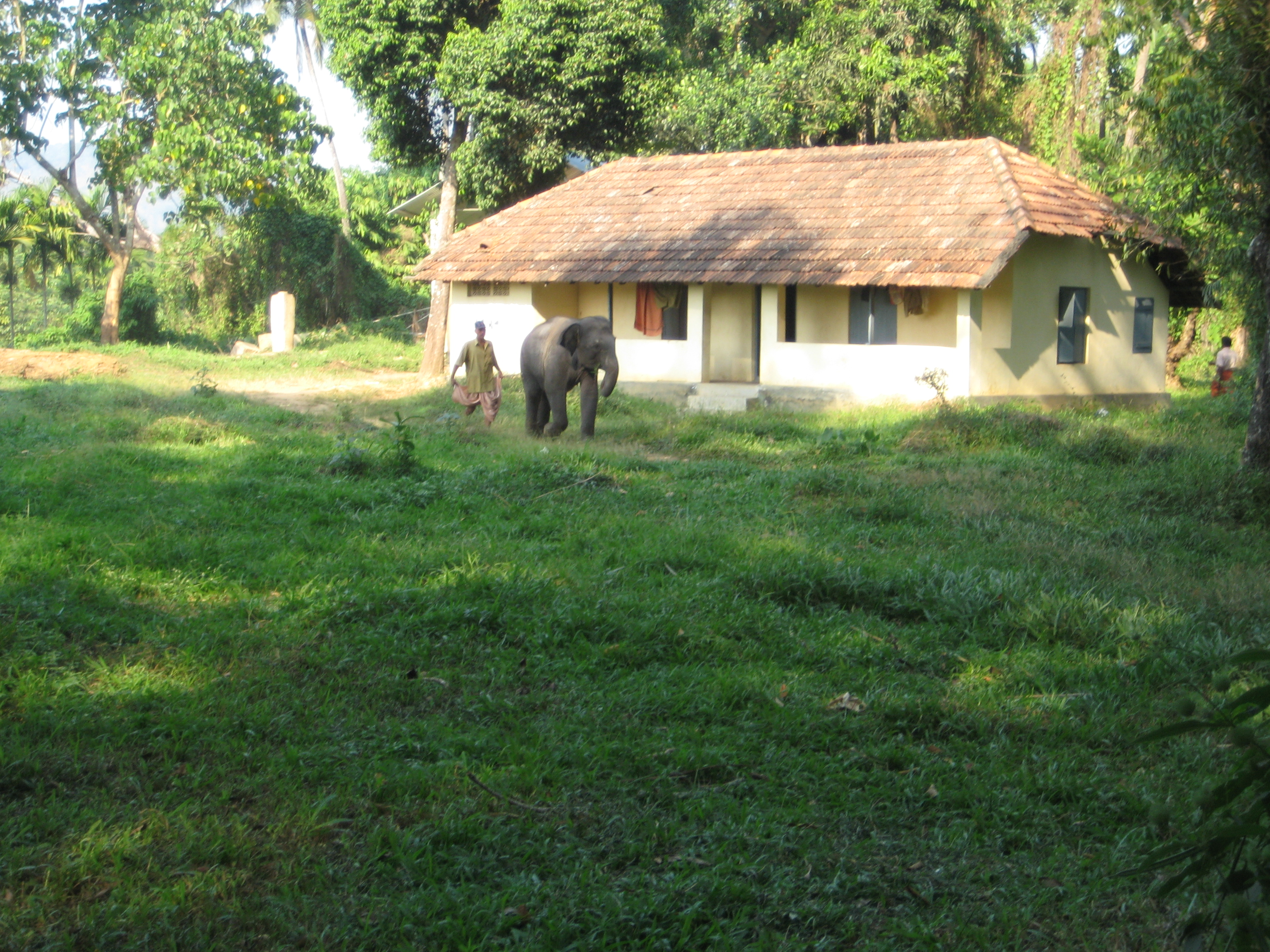
- A baby elephant in Kodanad

- Location within Kerala
- Location: Kaprikkad Ernakulam, Kerala, India
- Nearest city: Ernakulam
- Coordinates: 10.18°N 76.51°E
- Area: 123 ha (300 acres)
- Established: 1895 (As elephant training centre 2011 (Relocated and upgraded into animal shelter and elephant training centre)
- Visitors: 150,000 per year (in 2019)
- Governing body: Kerala Forest Department

Abhayaranyam is an animal shelter–mini zoo, which functions under the eco-tourism project of Kerala government. Located near to Kaprikad village in Kunnathunad taluk of Ernakulam district, the shelter was opened in 2011, with an aim to rehabilitate the animals in the Kodanad elephant training center, located two kilometers away. Kodanad Elephant training center was one of renowned and largest elephant training center in Kerala. It was also the first elephant training center in Kerala, started in 1895. The center covered an area of 2 acres and when the number of animals there kept increasing, all the animals were gradually relocated to Abhayaranyam, which has an area of 123 hectares.

== History ==
=== Kodanad elephant training center ===
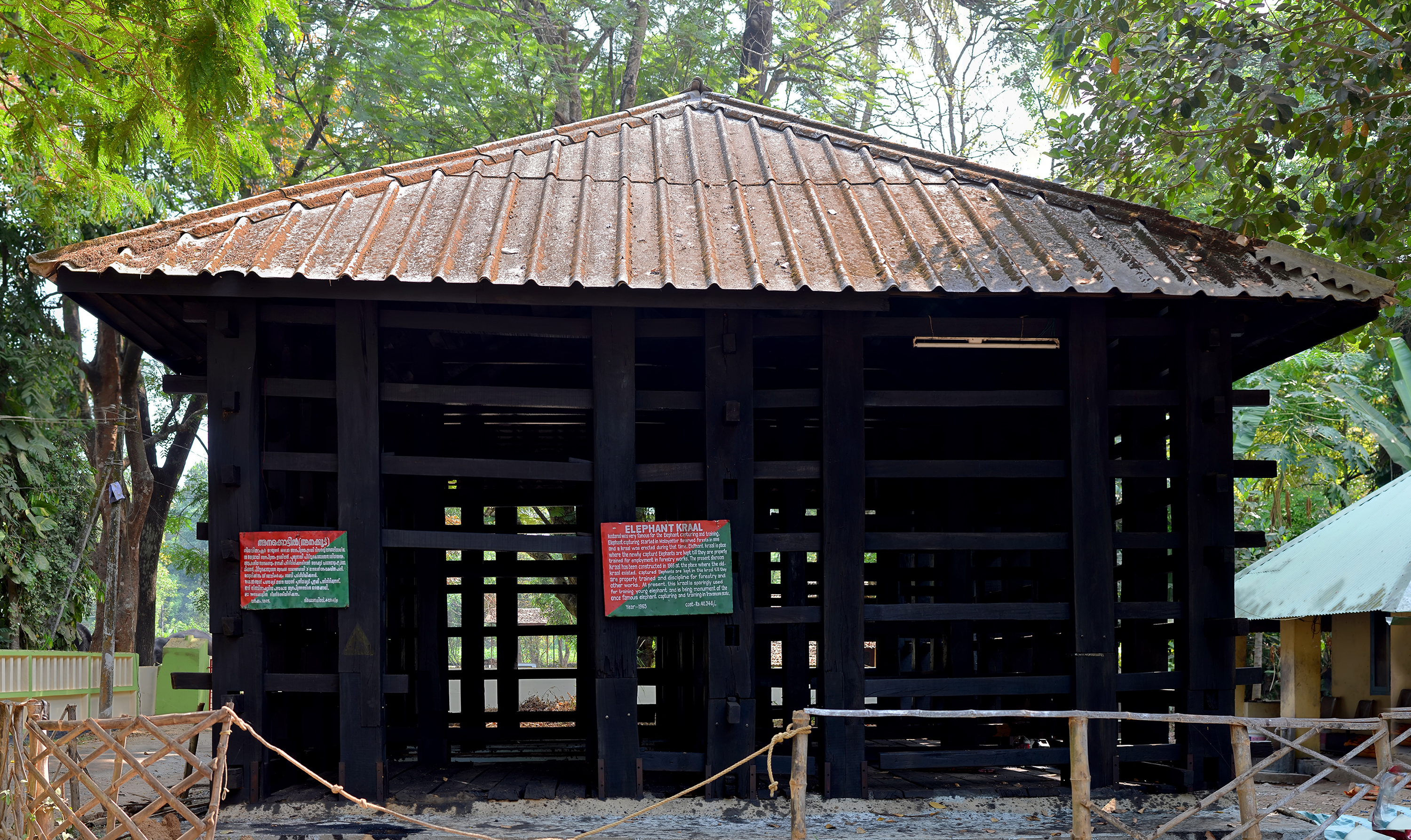
The famous elephant Kraal in Kodanad now remains as a reminiscent of its rich history

Elephant poaching and training were started in 1895 in the Malayattor forest reserves. The Kodanad elephant training, situated near the banks of Periyar was started in the same year, when the Travancore government decided to train the elephants caught in the wild. By 1950, it became one of the biggest elephant centers in Kerala. Over a period of time, hundreds of other animals and birds were also brought into this place and it was developed as a mini-zoo. There were many mahouts here, who specialized in taming and teaching the elephants. When the Indian government banned elephant poaching in 1977, it became a rehabilitation center for rescued elephants from forests, who have been injured or separated from their herd. With the relocation of the training center to nearby Abhayaranyam, the Kodanad elephant training center became unoperational was closed later. Presently, the main Aanakkoodu (elephant Kraal) here remains as a reminiscent of its rich history. Currently, it is under discussion to turn the century-old place into a heritage monument and start a new center for research on elephants. Some elephant lovers also demands to open a rescue center for baby elephants here.

=== Abhayaranyam ===
When the number of animals significantly increased in Kodanad, animal activists started complaining about keeping such a large number of animals in a small area of 2.5 acres of land. Abhayaranyam was opened on 18 February 2011, with an aim to house the elephants and other animals in open area of about two hundred acres with proper fencing to keep the animals safe. The Abhayaranyam project was launched as a mini zoo - rehabilitation center and as of 2021, it is home to six elephants and more than 300 deer. The center also has facilities like veterinary hospital, mortuary and water supply plant.

For elephant camp visit guests can easily stay in Elephant pass resort nearby

== See also ==
- Kottur Elephant Sanctuary and Rehabilation Centre
- Elephant Training Center, Konni
