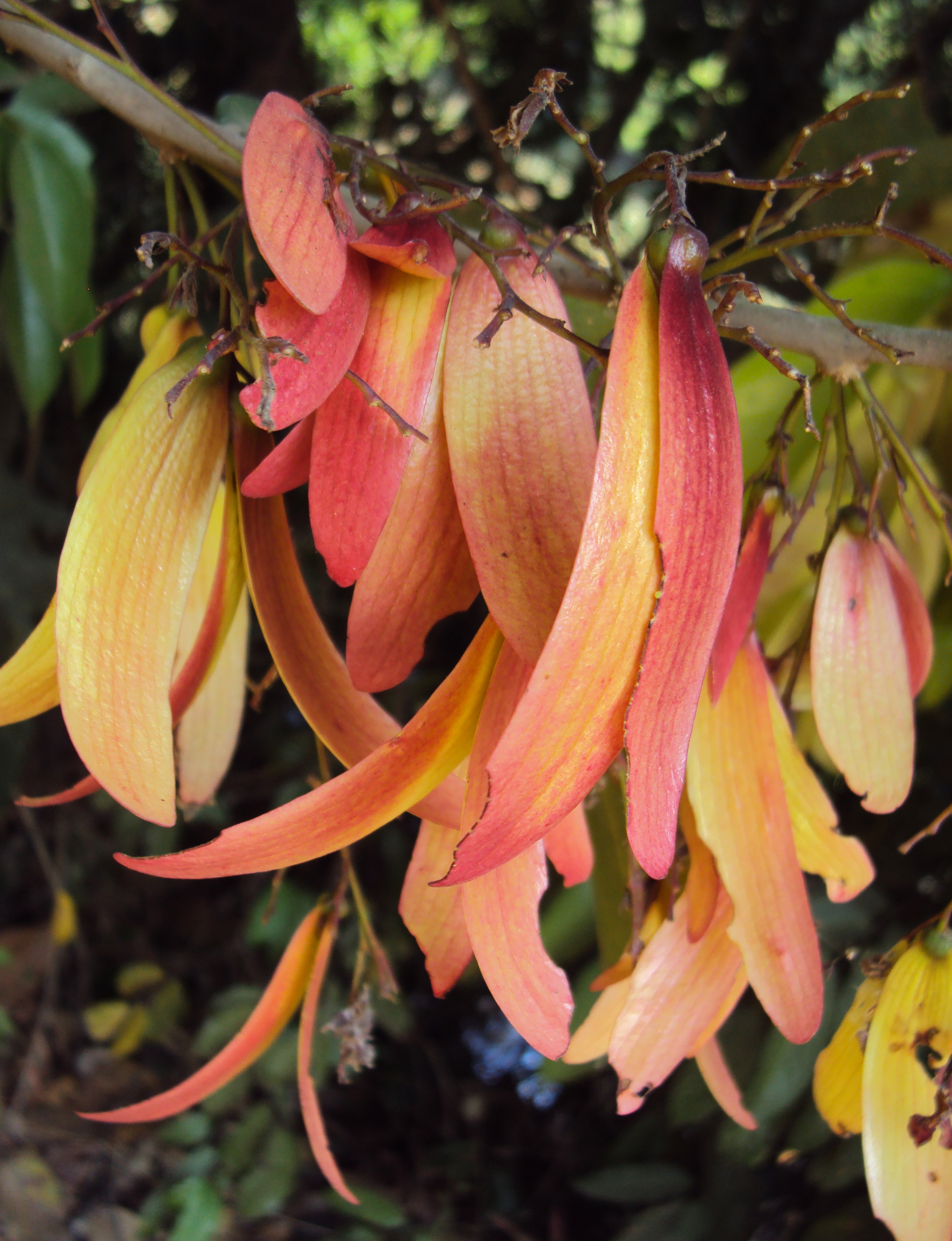
- Fruits, from Peravoor

Conservation status
- Vulnerable (IUCN 3.1)

Scientific classification
- Kingdom: Plantae
- Clade: Tracheophytes
- Clade: Angiosperms
- Clade: Eudicots
- Clade: Rosids
- Order: Malvales
- Family: Dipterocarpaceae
- Genus: Hopea
- Species: H. ponga

Binomial name
- Hopea ponga (Dennst.) Mabb.

Varieties
- Hopea ponga var. cauveriana Kesh.Murthy & Yogan.; Hopea ponga var. ponga

Synonyms
- Artocarpus ponga Dennst.; of var. ponga: Artocarpus canaranus Miq.; Broussonetia integrifolia Buch.-Ham.; Hopea wightiana Wall. ex Wight & Arn.

= Hopea ponga =

Species of tree

Hopea ponga is a species of flowering plant in the family Dipterocarpaceae. It is a tree endemic to southwestern and southern India. It is also known as kambakam (കമ്പകം) in Malayalam language.

It is gregarious tree which grows up to 25 metres tall. It is widespread in low- and medium-elevation evergreen and semi-evergreen rainforests of the Malabar coastal plain and Western Ghats from 25 to 900 metres elevation.

Two varieties are accepted:

- Hopea ponga var. cauveriana Kesh.Murthy & Yogan. – Karnataka
- Hopea ponga var. ponga – Goa, Karnataka, Kerala, Maharashtra and Tamil Nadu

== Gallery ==
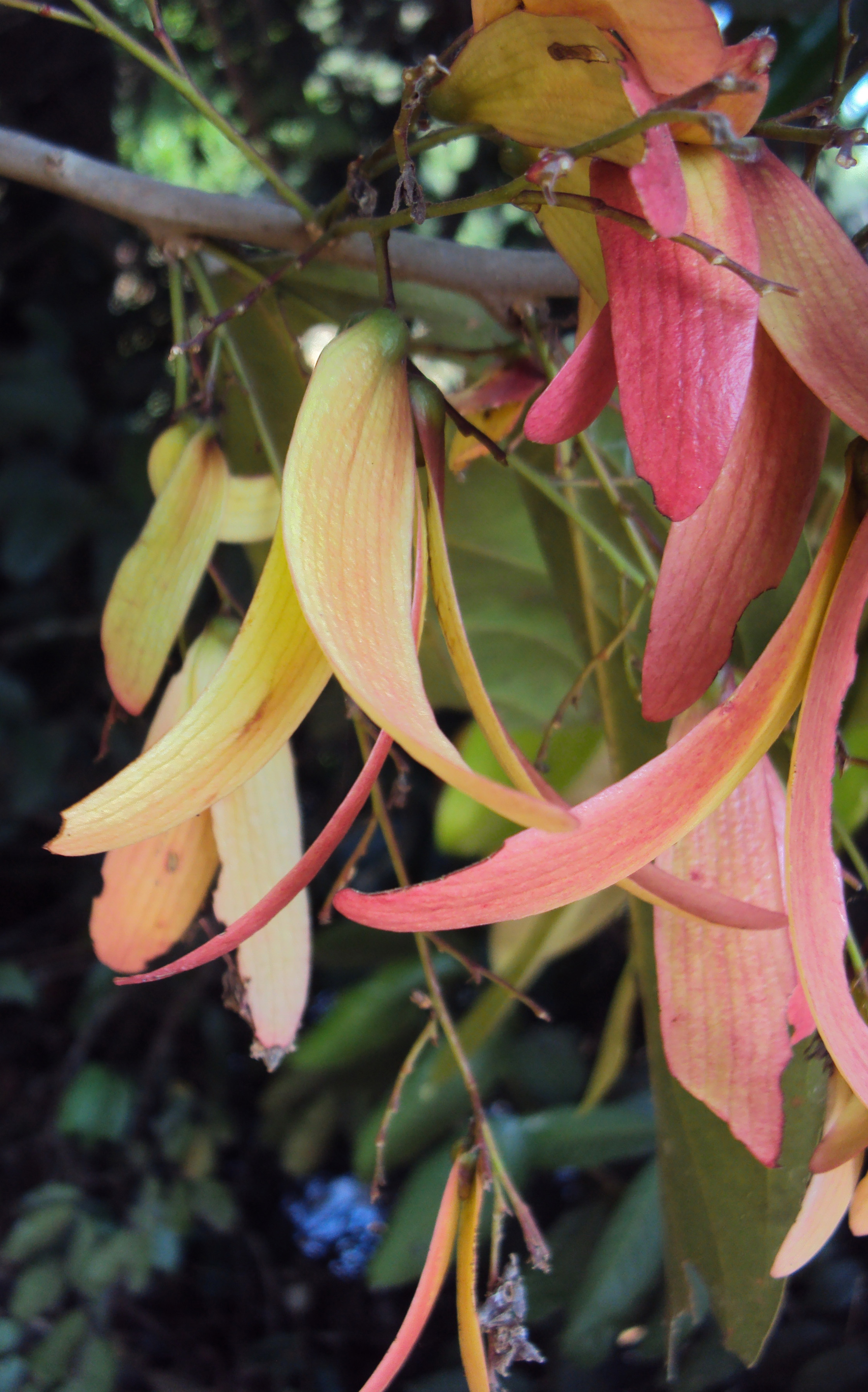

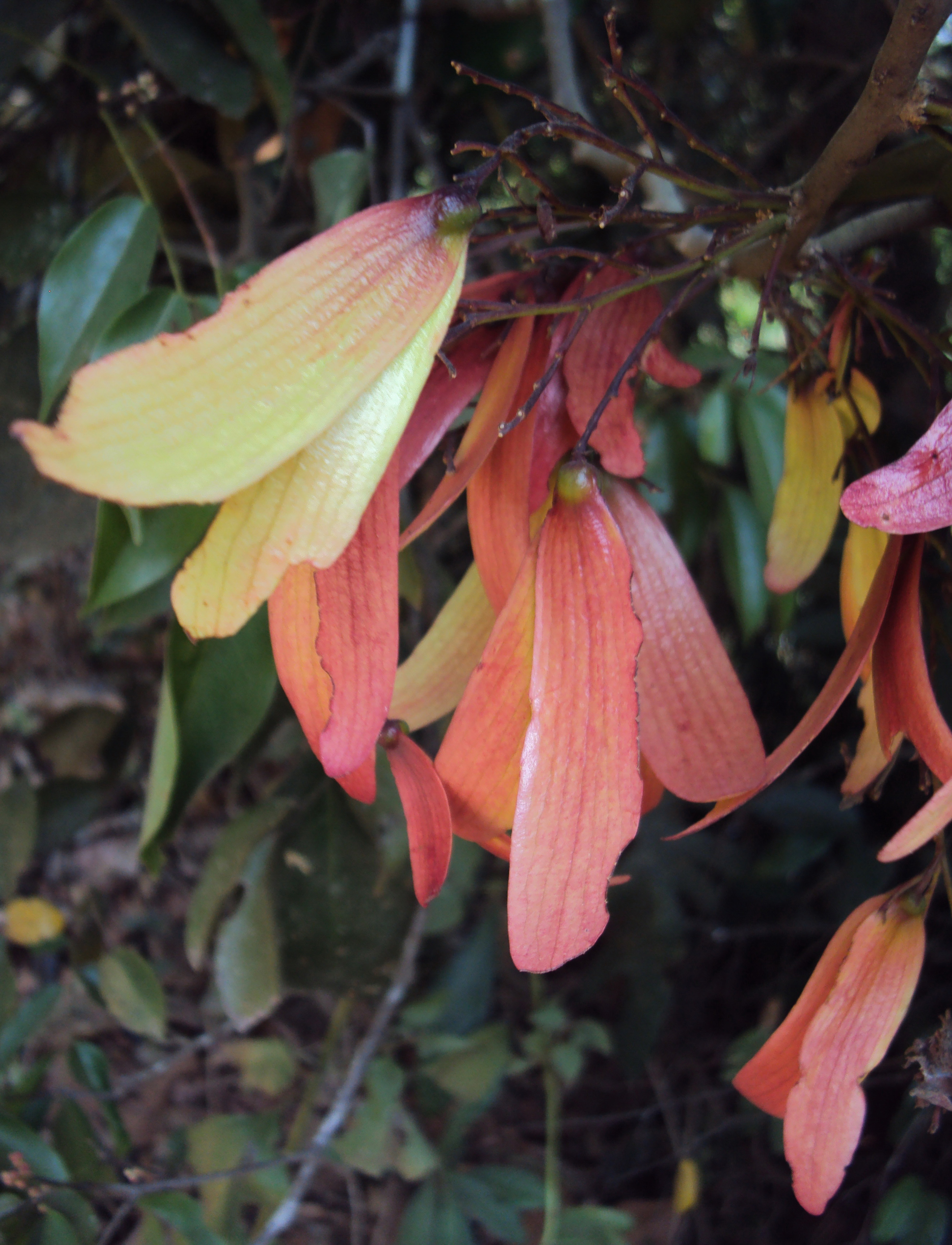

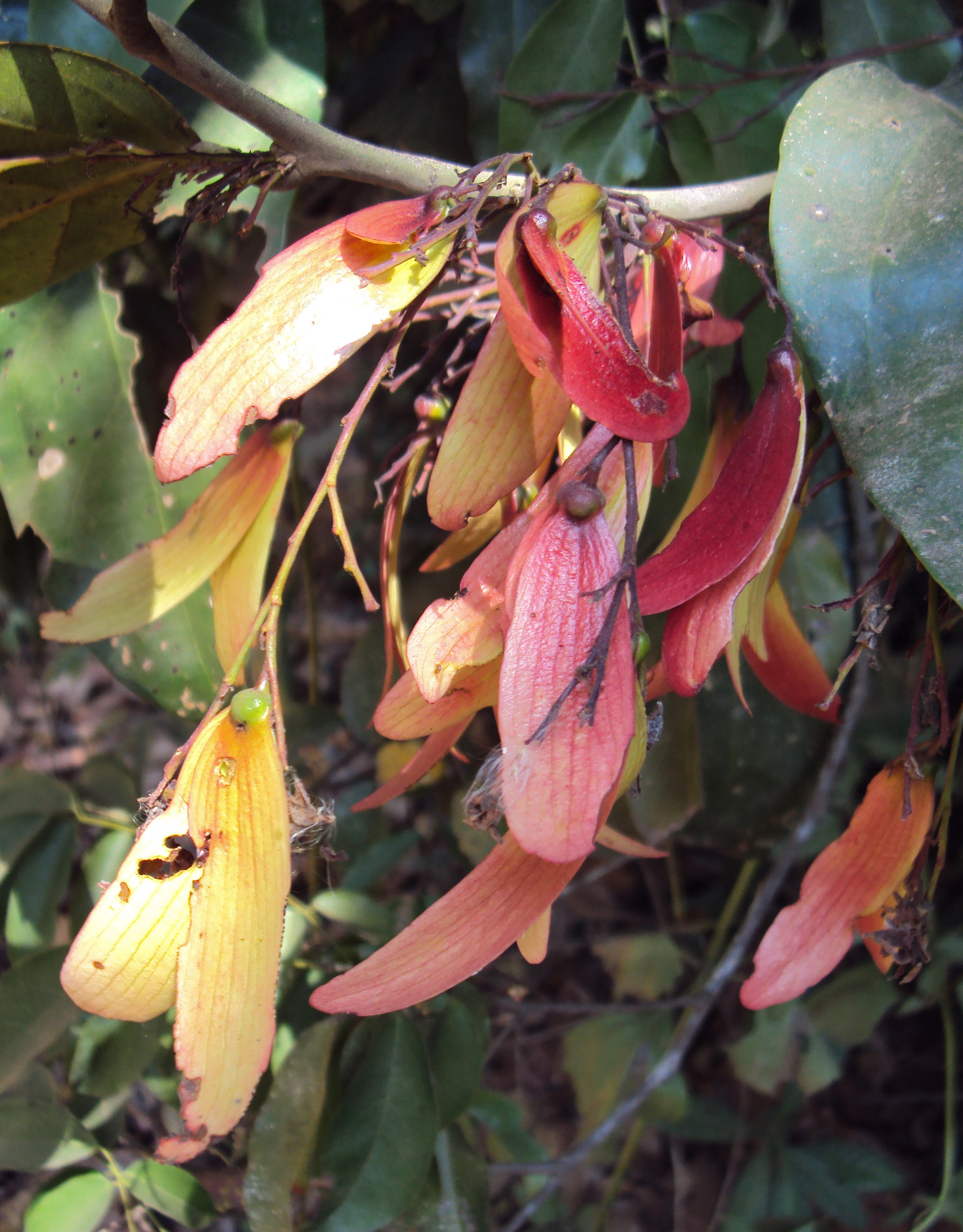

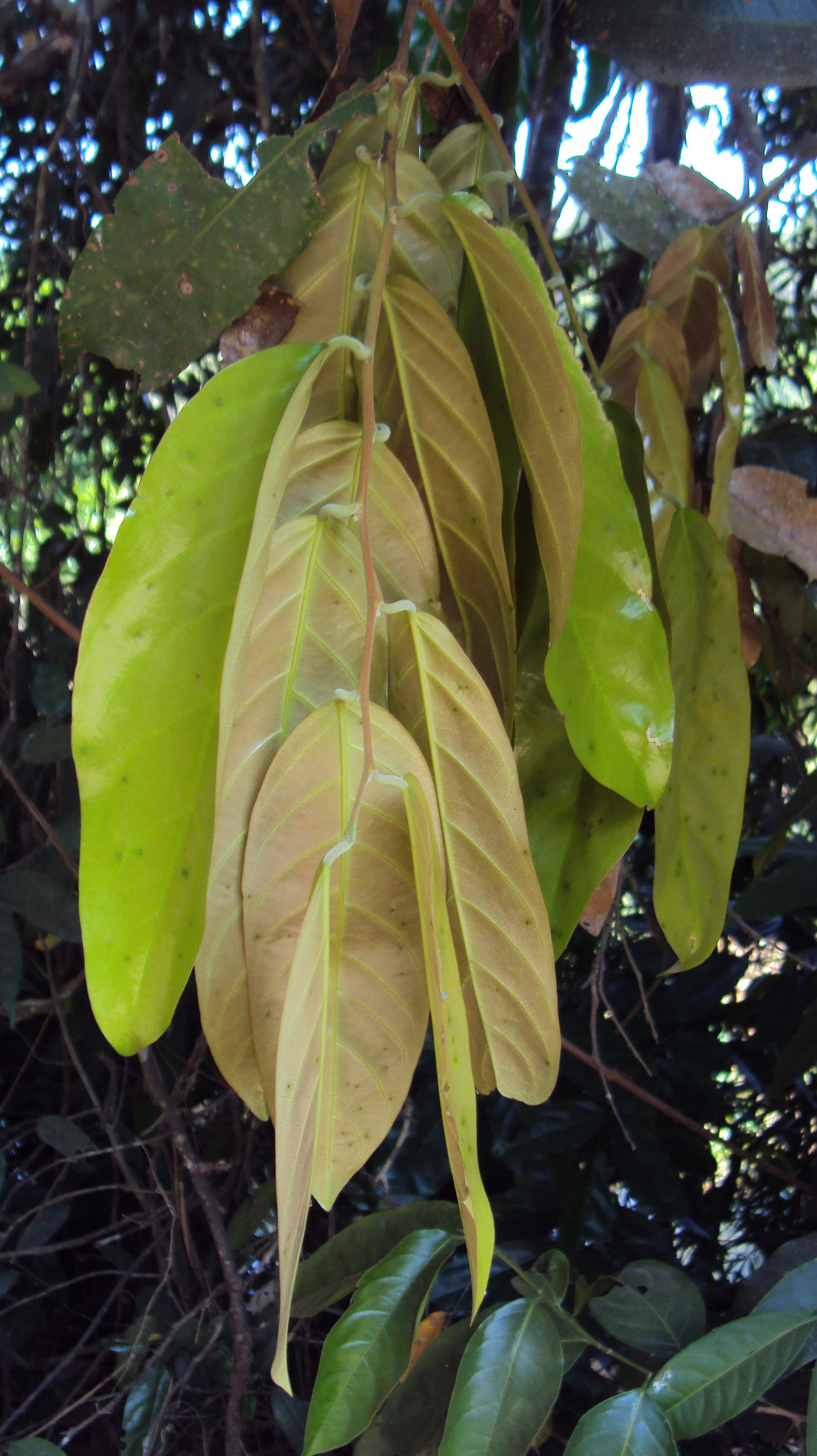

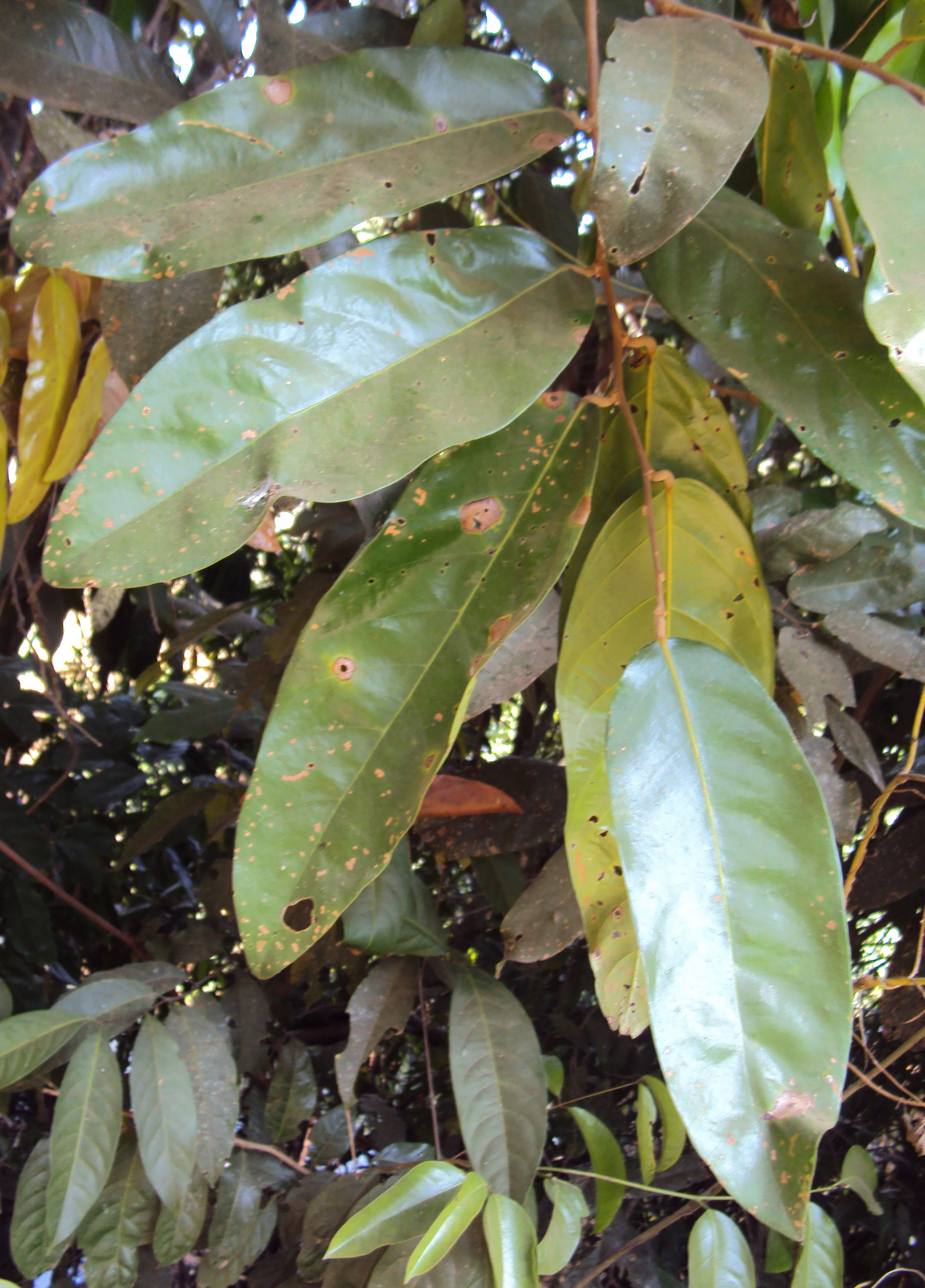
