= St. Antony's Church, Kodanad =

Church in Kerala, India

St Antonys Church Kodanad St Antonys Church
- town
- Location in Kerala, India
- Coordinates: 10°10′0″N 76°31′0″E
- Country: India
- State: Kerala
- District: Ernakulam
- Founder: Lijo KP

Languages
  - Official: Malayalam, English
- Time zone: UTC+5:30 (IST)
- PIN: 683544
- Telephone code: 0484
- Vehicle registration: KL-40
- Nearest city: Cochin
- Website: http://www.smcim.org/church/kodanad

St. Antony's Church, is a church in Kerala, India. It was built in 1986 and is dedicated to St. Anthony of Padua.
