= Elephant crushing =

Method of taming wild elephants

The Phajaan (Thai: ผ่าจ้าน), called "elephant crushing" or "training crush", is a method by which wild baby elephants can be tamed for domestication, using restriction in a cage, sometimes with the use of corporal punishment or negative reinforcement. This practice is condemned by a variety of animal-welfare groups as a form of animal cruelty.

== Training crush ==
As reported in the 1999 UN Report Gone Astray, in Myanmar and Thailand the "training crush" method involves placing an elephant in a strong, large stall or cage, tied with ropes to keep the elephant from moving, including being unable to kick, raise or swing its head. This method is supposed to crush the elephant's spirit. Proponents argue that this allows the elephant to properly and safely learn the basic command "Still!" or "Quiet!", and enables it to adapt to its new environment. As quoted in Gone Astray, a 1967 report on a training crush, "An elephant born in captivity is brought up amongst human beings and its training is humane from the day it begins, but a wild beast parted from the herd and its mother must suffer agonies before its will is broken."

=== Thailand ===
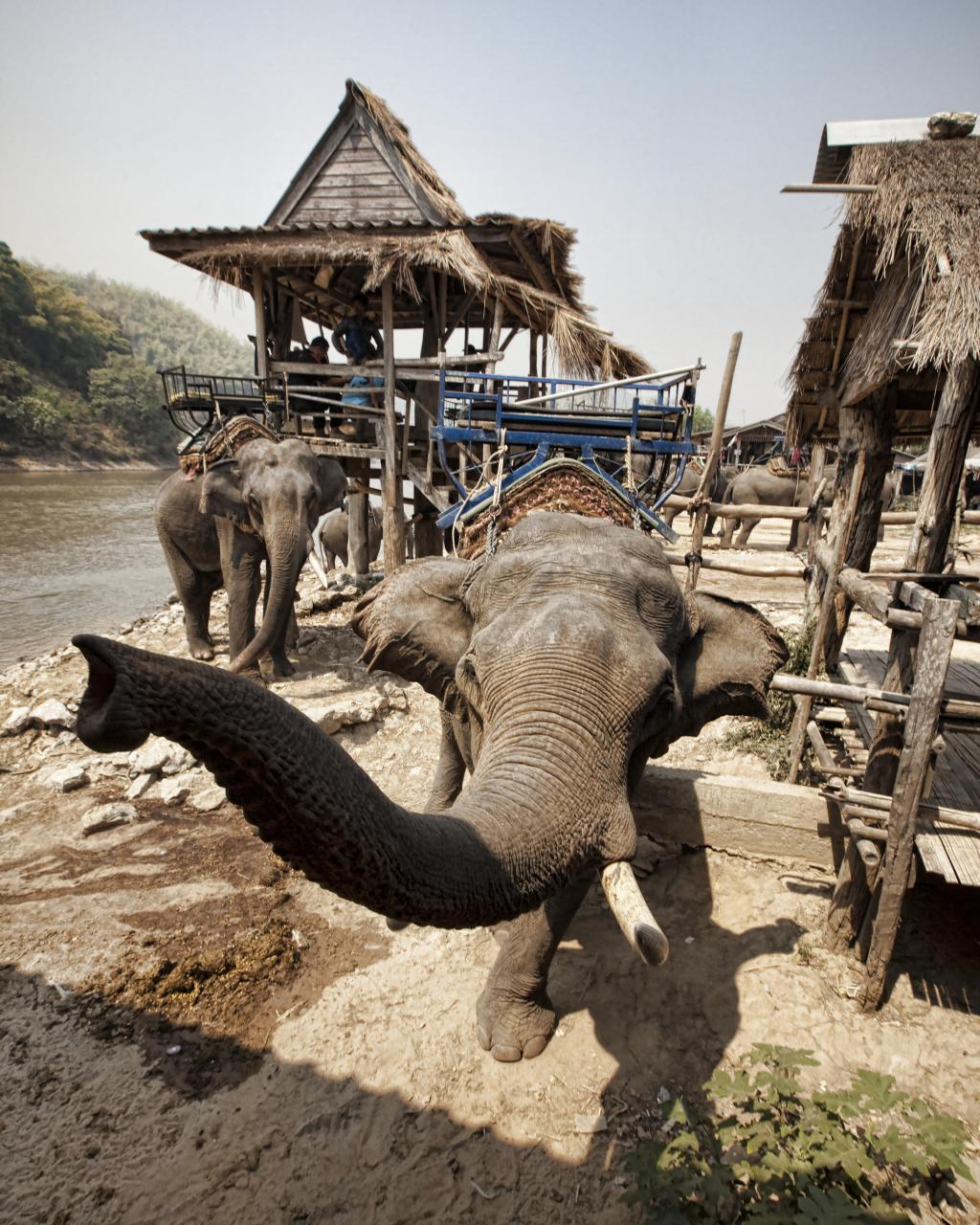
Elephants working in the tourist trade, Chiang Rai, Thailand

Working and performing elephants in Thailand are often poached from Myanmar and trafficked into Thailand. Of around 6,500 elephants currently living in Thailand, around 2,500 have been caught from the wild. Therefore, all of these elephants are being held captive solely for tourist attractions, disregarding the animals' welfare. Trafficked animals can be passed off as being locally reared, with birth and ownership documentations falsified.

Animal welfare advocates have called for better legislation and systems to document the origin of elephants in tourist camps and other locations across Thailand. An undercover video footage showed elephant crushing being commonly used in Thailand in 2019.
