= Kaprikkad =

Kaprikad
- town
- Location in Kerala, India
- Coordinates: 10°10′0″N 76°31′0″E
- Country: India
- State: Kerala
- District: Ernakulam
- Founder: Lijo KP

Languages
  - Official: Malayalam, English
- Time zone: UTC+5:30 (IST)
- PIN: 683544
- Telephone code: 0484
- Vehicle registration: KL-40
- Nearest city: Cochin

Kaprikad is a rural riverside village of Ernakulam district, Kerala, southern India. Kaprikad is situated on the south bank of Periyar river, about 42 kilometers east of Kochi. The nearest airport is Cochin International Airport which is about 18 km (12 mi) by road. The village is a major tourist destination in the district because it houses the Kodanad Abhayaranyam animal shelter and elephant training centre.

== Transportation ==
Kaprikad has got private bus services to places inside Perumbavoor and run into several neighbouring towns. There are a few bus services to Perumbavoor from here. Autorickshaws are commonly used for small distances. The nearest railway stations are Angamaly and Aluva. The Cochin International Airport at Nedumbassery is only 18 km from the Kaprikad. KL-40 is the RTO code for Kunnathunad Taluk and Perumbavoor. Perumbavoor JRTO is situated at Pattal.

Kaprikad is surrounded by many small but populous commuter villages. The notable ones are Kodanad, Thottuva, Alattuchira, Panamkuzhy, Cheranalloor, Kurichilakode, kaprikad etc. Vallam town is one of the main interchange points for public transport.

== Nearby places ==
- Malayattoor Pilgrim 5 km
- Elephant kral 3 km
- Paniyeli poru 13 km
- Airport 18 km
- Angamaly 19 km
- Muvattupuzha 21 km
- Varapuzha (Paravur) 33 km
- Piravom 34 km
- North Paravur 36 km
- Kochi City 38 km
- Poochackal പൂച്ചാക്കല്‍ 43 km
- Aroor 43 km
- Kodungallur 50 km

== Kaprikkad Ecotourism project ==
Kodanad is in the list of Ecotourism destination projects sponsored by the Government of India. As a part of this project, Kaprikkad, a village lying 3 km adjacent to Kodanad on the river bank, has been set up in 2006 for entertaining visitors in the most natural and environmental friendly way.

== Places of worship ==
- Churches
- Temples

== Churches ==
- St. Antony's Church, Kodanad (2 km)
- St. Thomas Church, Malayatoor (5 km)
