= Temple elephant =

Type of captive elephant

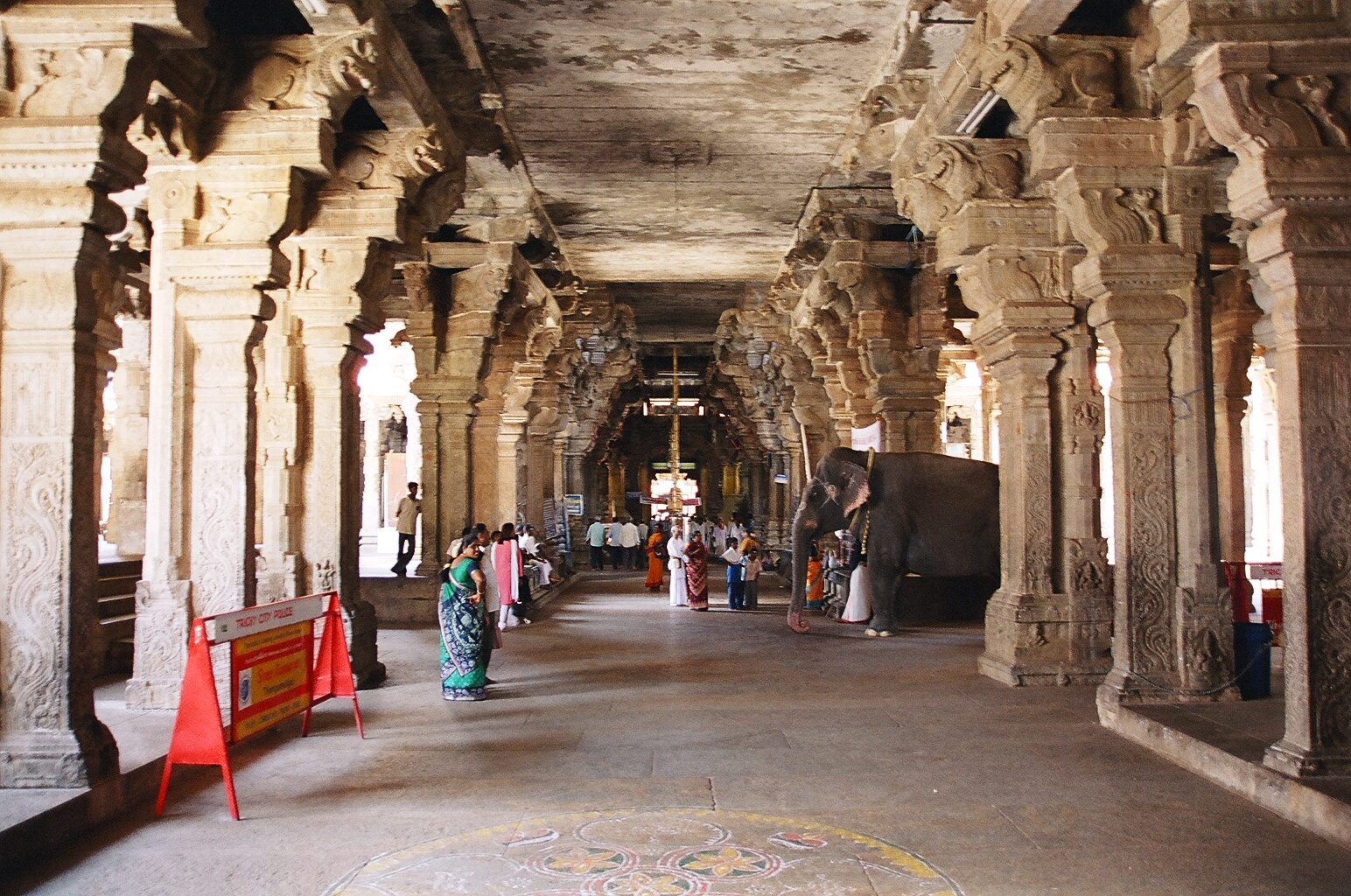
Temple elephant at the Srirangam Temple, Tiruchirapalli, Tamil Nadu, 2006

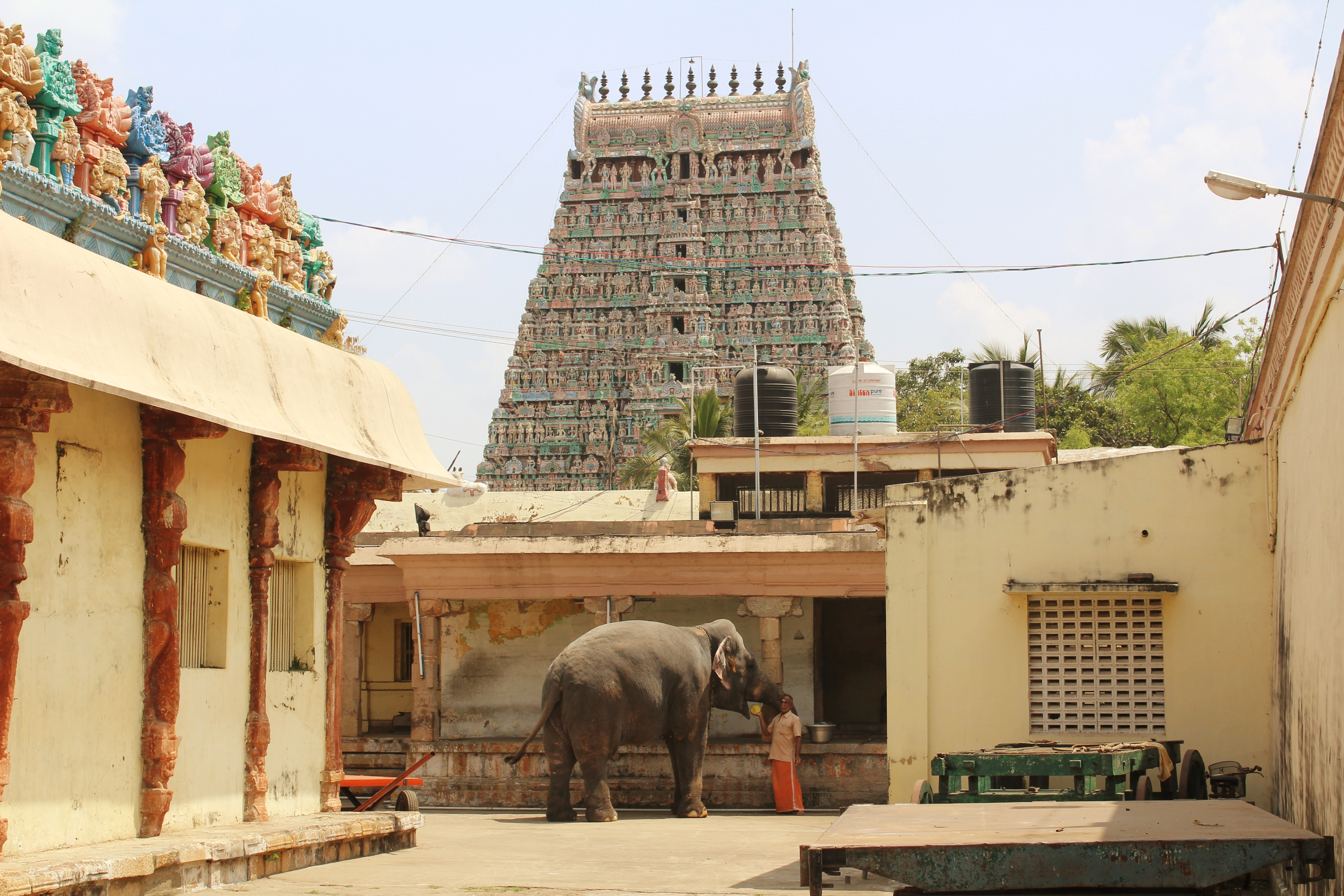
Temple elephant at the Kumbeswarar Temple, Kumbakonam, Tamil Nadu, 2020

Temple elephants are a type of captive elephant that are kept in temples in Asian countries such as India and Sri Lanka.

Elephants generally play an important role in the Hinduism and Buddhism cultures of South and Southeast Asia and are considered sacred. Temple elephants are usually wild animals, poached from wild herds at a young age and then sold into captivity to temples. Temple elephants usually take part in religious rituals or processions; believers also allow themselves to be blessed by them. However, sometimes a temple owns elephants that are not all used for rituals. At large religious festivals (e.g. in Thrissur Pooram), privately owned elephants which are considered particularly sacred due to special physical characteristics are also used. In the literature these are also referred to as temple or ceremonial elephants.

In the early 21st century, experts and conservationists strongly criticised the keeping of captive elephants in temples, as the living conditions are usually problematic and the elephants have little opportunity to fulfil their natural needs. Others claim that elephants form a vital part of the socio-economic framework of many temple ceremonies and festivals in India, particularly in South India.

== History ==
In Hinduism, the elephant-headed god Ganesha exists as an embodiment of wisdom, scholarship and prosperity. The sacred white elephant Airavata is considered the ancestor of all elephants and plays a prominent role as the mount of the god Indra. According to Buddhist legends, the mother of the historical Gautama Buddha only became pregnant with him after seeing a white elephant in a dream; Buddha is also said to have been saved later by an elephant that was supposed to crush him. There are other myths in Hinduism in which elephants play an important role. As a result, not only are South and Southeast Asian temples often decorated with elephant sculptures, but living elephants are also kept in temples to bring good luck according to Hindu and Buddhist beliefs. In some temples, elephants have a special meaning in connection with a deity worshipped at this place.

The tradition of keeping temple elephants is ancient, but it is not known exactly when it began. Despite the religious associations, elephants are said to have originally been used primarily to transport water from the nearest river to the temple; they had to stand near the temple during certain 'auspicious hours', but lived freely in the forest near the temple the rest of the time. It is only later that other ritual functions are said to have developed. Some researchers suspect that war elephants were once also housed in temples between battles (Ghosh, 2005) - this mainly related to temples with a tradition of male elephants, such as in the Indian state of Kerala.

== India ==
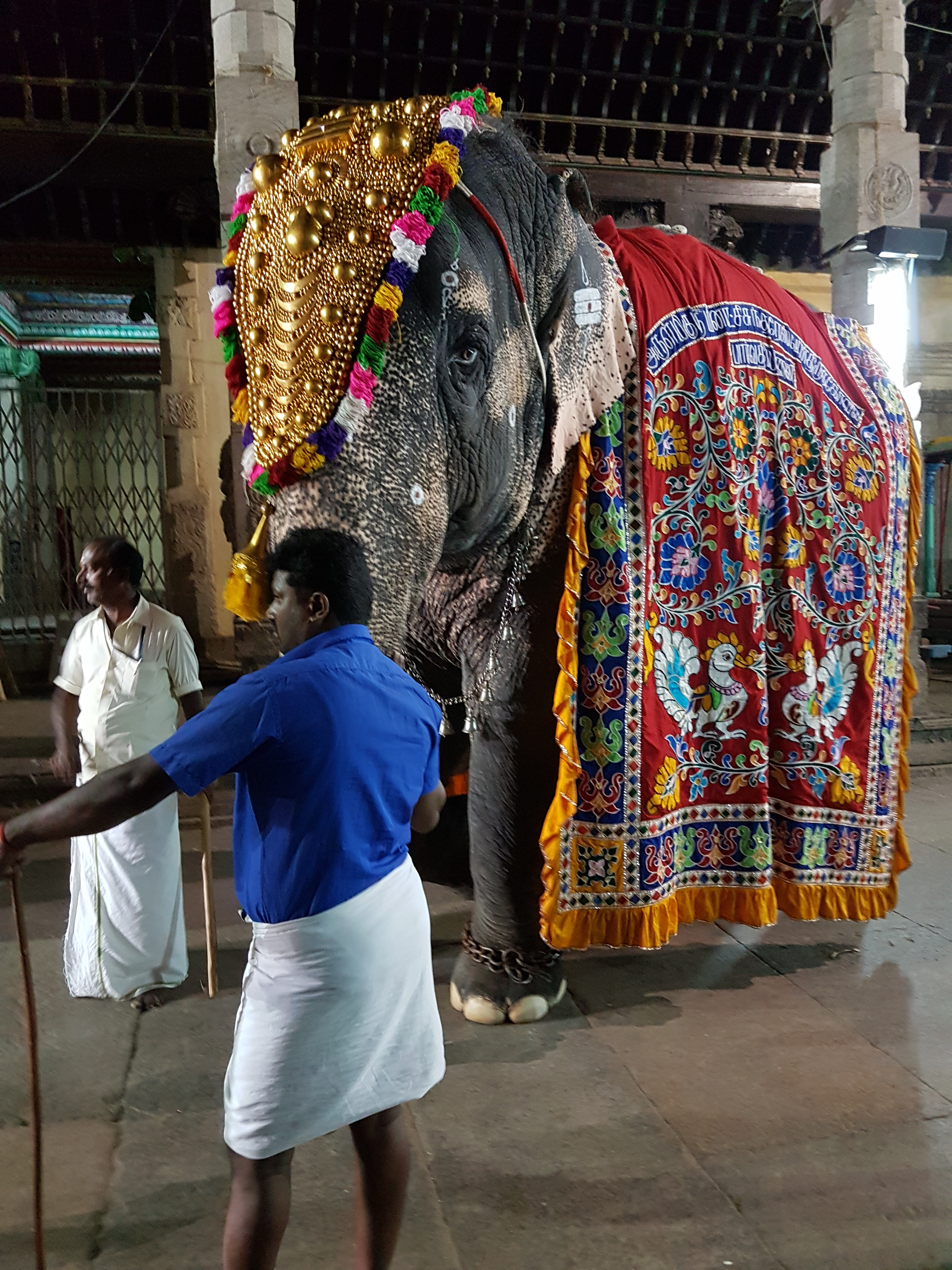
Temple elephant in regalia at Meenakshi Temple, Madurai, Tamil Nadu

=== Origin and general characteristics ===
Important temples, especially in South India, keep their own temple elephants in the modern era, which are acquired either by purchase or as gifts. However, it is possible that elephants declared as a 'gift' to a temple at the end of the 20th or in the 21st century were actually acquired on the illegal black market. This was a common practice after India banned the trade in elephants in 1972 and the capture of wild elephants in 1982. Illegal elephant trade (e.g. in Sonpur Mela) continued until the present day (2024).

Temples and festivals in Tamil Nadu and Kerala and other states were determined to be involved in the illegal elephant trade. According to Suparna Baksi Ganguly, founder of the Wildlife Rescue and Rehabilitation Centre in Bangalore City, elephant babies or children are usually caught illegally in the northern forests of Assam, Bihar or Arunachal Pradesh and smuggled across several state borders to southern Indian states, utilizing corruption and bribes. Only very rarely has an elephant been explicitly "rescued" in a temple; conversely, maltreated elephants have to be rescued from temples more often.

Elephants that are already born in a temple are extremely rare, as many temple elephants are kept alone and in isolation. These elephants have little or no contact with the opposite sex, and the reproductive capacity of female elephants in captivity is greatly reduced, especially if they are not comfortable. Furthermore, male elephants in musth - an important requirement for mating - are usually isolated and strictly chained. Furthermore, according to Richard C. Lair (1997) "Hindu temples ... have specific prohibitions against breeding". In 2009, there were no animals under 6 years of age among India's temple elephants, with most of them aged between 16 and 60 years old.

In the states of Tamil Nadu and Karnataka, mainly female temple elephants are found. In the age of social media, some of these elephants are particularly well-known or popular, such as in Tamil Nadu the temple elephants Andal (or Andaal) at the Srirangam (or Sri Ranganathaswamy) temple in Tiruchirappalli, Akila at Jambukeshwara temple in Tiruvanaikkaval or Mangalam at the Kumbeswara (or Kumbeswarar Kovil) temple in Kumbakonam (2024).

In the southern Indian state of Kerala, traditionally male temple elephants are favoured, but they are more aggressive and can be dangerous, especially during intermittent musth periods. The Guruvayur Temple in the Thrissur district alone in 2009 had 54 bull elephants, plus 6 females, in 2019, there were 45 bulls, of which only 13 were used for rituals, according to Sangita Iyer.

=== Tasks ===
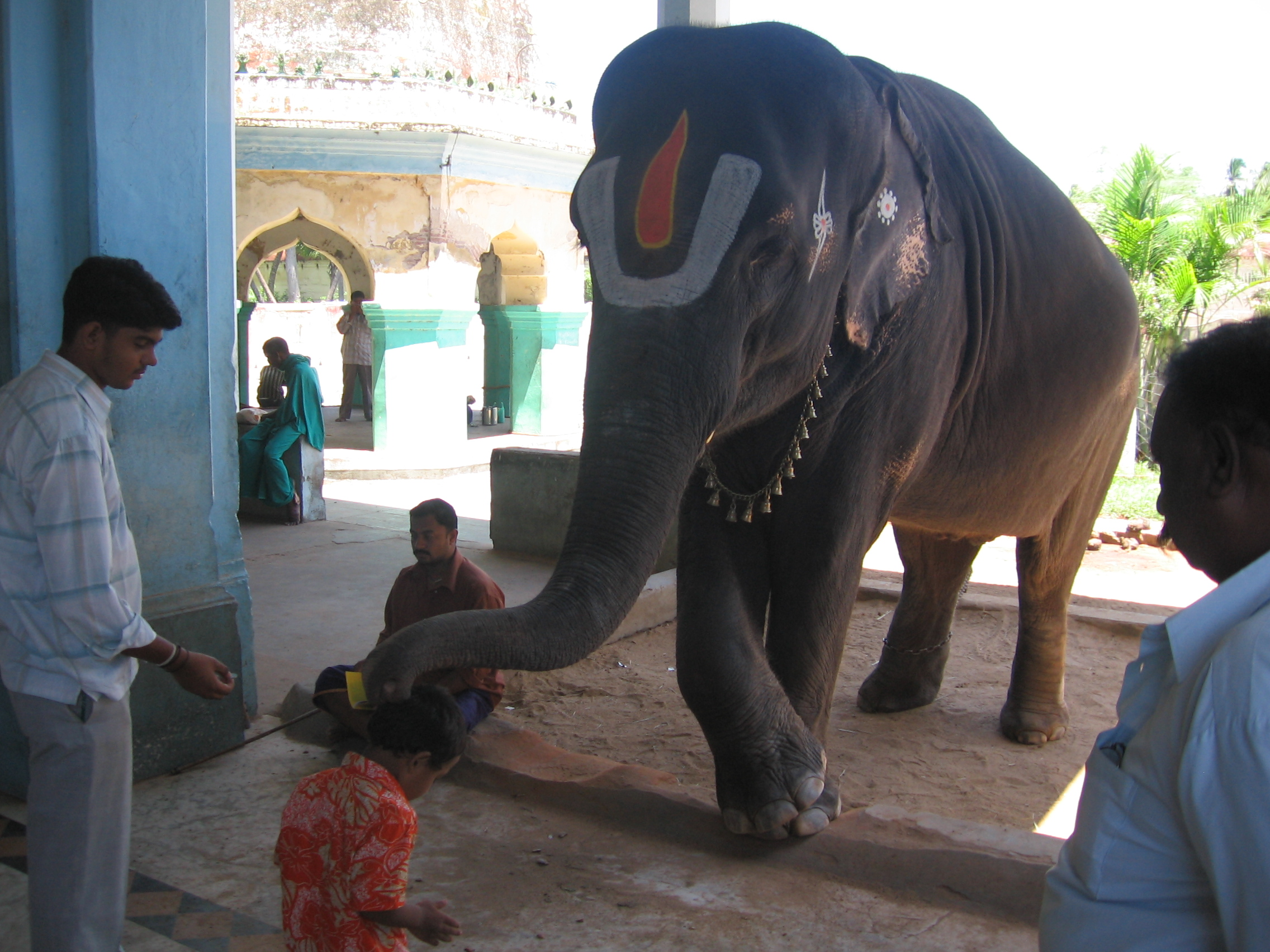
Blessing Temple Elephant at Oppiliappan Temple, Kumbakonam, 2007

The temple elephants take part in religious ceremonies in the temple together with their mahouts. Their faces, trunks and ears are painted and they may also be adorned with garlands, colourful shabracks and a so-called nettipattom, which covers the forehead and part of the trunk. Temple elephants often also wear one or more bells around their neck or on their body. They are also trained in some special skills beforehand, such as bowing or assuming a kind of "prayer posture" with the trunk raised to the forehead; some elephants also learn to play the mouth organ (or harmonica).

One of the duties of the temple elephants is to stand together with their mahout at a certain place in the temple, often near the entrance, to give blessing to the worshippers, which consists of briefly placing or tapping the trunk on their heads. According to a 2010 study, temple elephants in Tamil Nadu spent on average about 4 1/2 hours doing these blessings every day and have to stand the whole time (sometimes chained up). According to Surendra Varma et al. (2009) individual elephants must give the blessing 800 to 2000 times on feast days.

There are also special religious festivals with glamorous elephant processions and parades, which attract many tourists - the elephant parades in Kerala are particularly famous. Elephants and their mahouts are also hired for the big temple festivals, which can cost up to around 10,000 dollars per elephant per festival. The Guruvayur temple mentioned above, for example, rents out its elephants and around 2019 charged 700,000 rupees (= approx. 11,600 dollars) per day for a "celebrity elephant".

=== Living conditions, problems, criticism ===
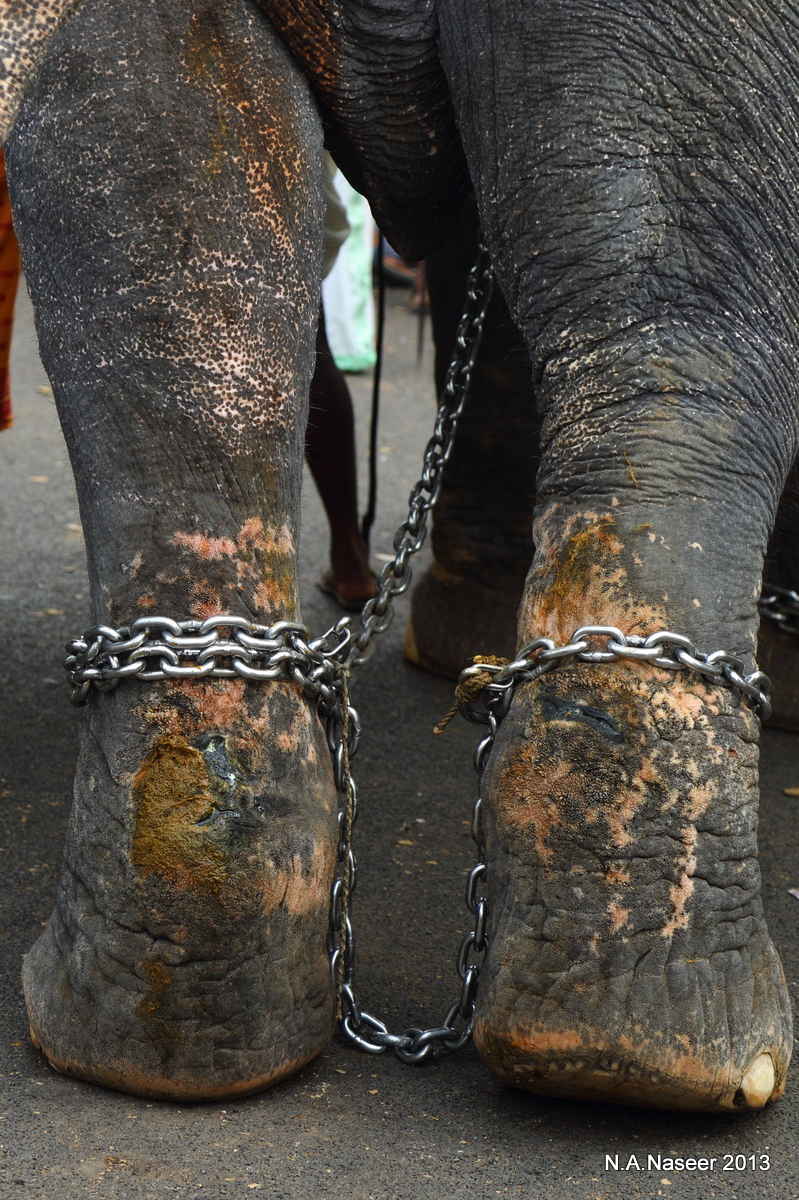
Elephant in chains with injured skin, Thrissur Pooram Festival, Kerala

A first great scientific study on temple elephants and their living conditions was published in 2009. 267 elephants from 112 temples in five Indian states were analysed; the majority of the elephants studied (161) lived in Kerala. The results were alarming: there were considerable deficits in nine out of ten parameters observed (e.g. food, shelter, exercise opportunities, health, access to water and bathing opportunities, social contacts with other elephants, etc.), which are vital for elephants in captivity; a species-typical behaviour of the temple elephants was curtailed in a variety of ways.

Overall, the 2009 researchers came to the following conclusion: "Keeping of elephants in temples and ensuring their welfare therein seems to be an uphill task. It is in the interest of the elephants and of the general public that no new elephants be brought under the management of temples. It would be best to phase out temple elephants over a designated period of time“.

Elephant conservation activist Sangita Iyer reached a wider audience with her 2016 award-winning documentary film Gods in Shackles, in which she exposes the brutal reality of temple and ceremonial elephants behind the glittering façade of religious festivals such as Thrissur Pooram. Iyer, her organisation Voices for Asian elephants and various other animal welfare organisations around the world are campaigning against the common cruel practices. Often, temple elephants are taken from their mothers as babies and subjected to the procedure known as phajaan, in which they are tied up, beaten, or starved to make them docile.

If separation from the mother happens too early (and the baby survives), this has lifelong health consequences for the elephant, as elephant calves are dependent on their mother's milk for a very long time. Later, the elephants not only have to stand around for hours on hard concrete or stone floors - according to a 2010 study, temple elephants in Tamil Nadu had less than one hour of exercise a day and had to stand for about 70 per cent of their time–, usually shackled with short chains and isolated from conspecifics, they are also beaten and threatened with sharp elephant hooks. Many animals have problems with their feet and joints or other health problems and/or show stereotypical behaviour, such as rocking back and forth, which is typical of animals in captivity and indicates mental trauma.

In contrast to its negative origin, this stereotypical behaviour may be misinterpreted by Indian mahouts and followers of traditional elephant husbandry as “dancing" and as a sign that an elephant is happy. In particularly bad cases, elephants have also been put on chains with sharp hooks that dig into their flesh, and some animals have had their eyes pecked out by angry mahouts. During religious festivals, the animals, gifted with exceptionally fine hearing, also have to endure the clamour of huge crowds and the noise of firecrackers. Even elephants suffering from painful rheumatism, arthritis, bronchitis or other chronic diseases were rarely spared from participating in strenuous festivals. Despite legal regulations to the contrary, the owners had obviously corrupt or incompetent vets certify the alleged health and 'fitness’ of an elephant that was actually ill. Around 2009, temple elephants in Kerala took part in 40 to 100 different programmes during the festival season and had to travel repeatedly to different locations within a radius of 35 to 150 km. As of 2019, the elephants of the Guruvayur temple were given a diet that was far too unbalanced, had no access to water in the sweltering heat and suffered from sometimes fatal diseases caused by poor hygiene, among other issues.

Male captive elephants are treated particularly harshly. Every year, during their three- to four-month long musth periods, they are constantly tied up in a confined space, unable to move. At the end of musth they are subjected to a traditional “ritual" called Katti Adikkal, where they are beaten continuously for 48 to 72 hours by a group of men in order to break their will again (similar to phajaan).

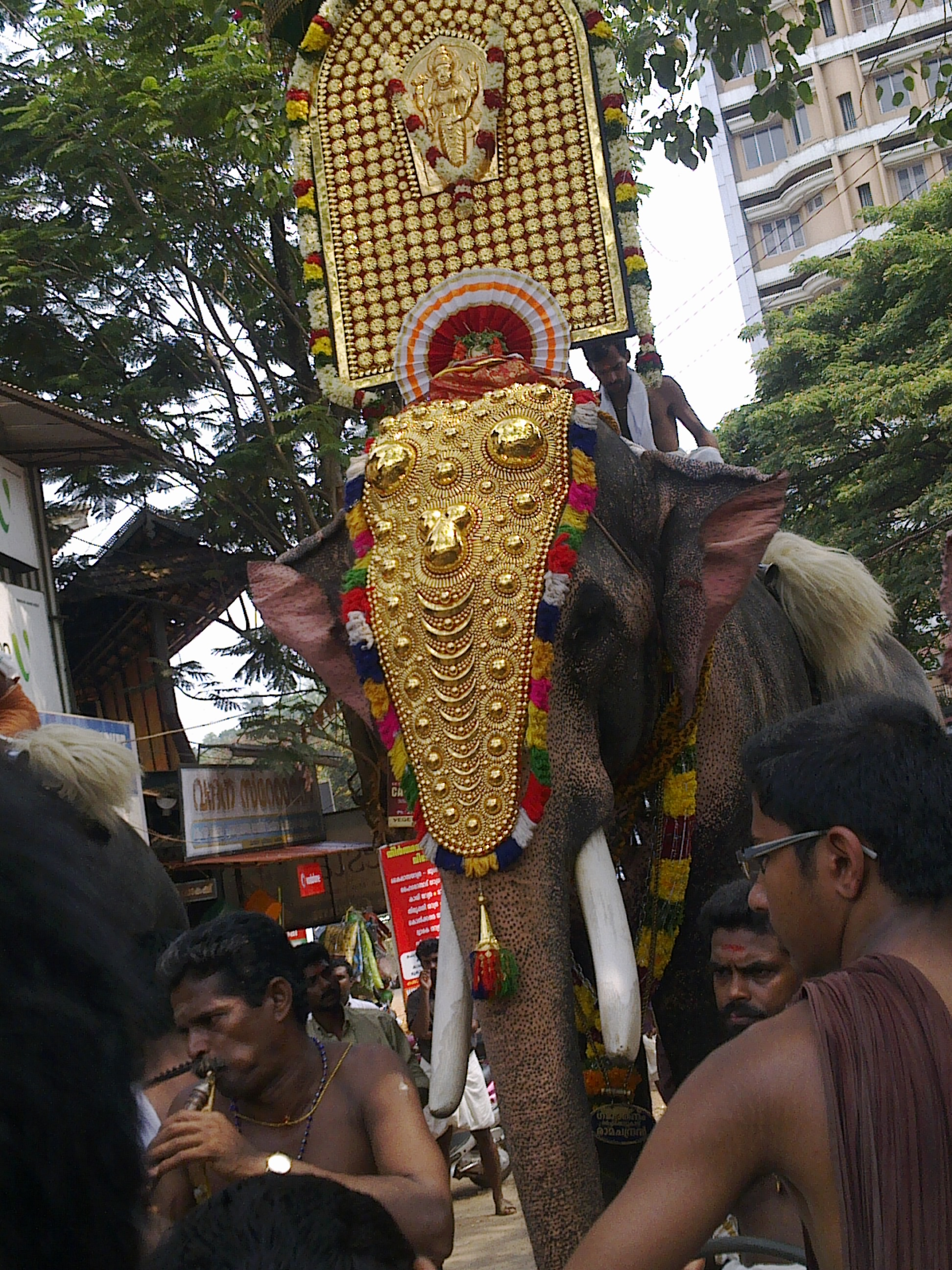
The famous elephant Thechikkottukavu Ramachandran in ceremonial regalia during a procession, 2011 (Ramanchira temple, Thrissur)

The severe, traumatising stress on the animals is expressed not least in repeated news reports of elephants either suddenly and seemingly unexpectedly ‘going berserk’ and injuring or ‘killing’ their mahout or another human - probably often unintentionally - or sometimes trample people to death in the midst of crowds. A well-known case of the latter is the famous and highly revered bull elephant Thechikottukavu Ramachandran, who is considered the ‘largest Asian elephant in captivity’, who ‘ran amok’ several times out of stress and killed both humans and conspecifics; Ramachandran himself is the victim of a mahout who at some point hacked one of his eyes blind. Ramachandran for security reasons has already been banned by the government from the famous Thrissur Pooram temple festival, where he opened a temple gate during a traditional ceremony to the enthusiastic cries of an unleashed crowd. However, due to massive protests from the festival organisers, elephant owners, fans and the Kerala Elephant Owners Federation, he had to be allowed back in.

Possibly in response to the increasing protests about animal cruelty, so-called ‘rejuvenation camps’ were set up for temple elephants, which take place once a year for around six weeks. However, the elephants still have to stand around chained, and many have severe problems with their legs. Some also make stereotypical pendulum movements with their heads, which are considered a typical sign of mental trauma, due to the chronic lack of movement and standing still for long periods of time. In 2021, there was a scandal over a YouTube video showing two mahouts in a ‘rejuvenation camp’ abusing a female temple elephant from Assam with beatings.

To reduce the burden on existing domesticated elephants, robotics companies Four He-Art Creations and Aanamaker with PETA India and the group Voices for Asian Elephants began constructing imitative animatronic elephants. The first robotic elephant was donated to the Irinjadappilly Sree Krishna Temple in Thrissur, Kerala in 2023; 5 more robot elephants have been made for temples across the South India region since.

== Sri Lanka ==
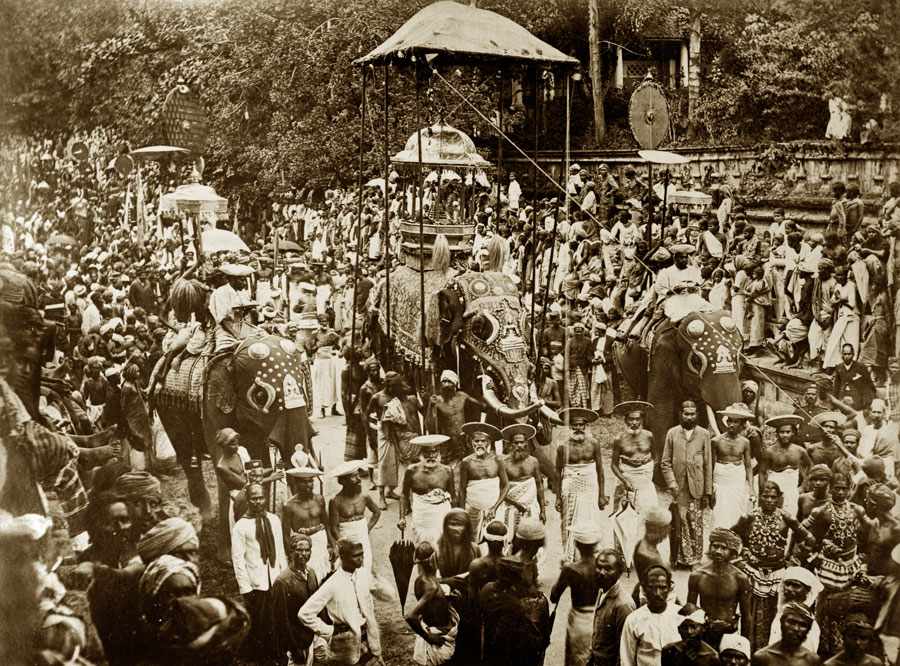
Elephants with Buddha reliquary at the Kandy Esala Perahera, Sri Lanka, c. 1885

The situation of the temple elephants is similar in Sri Lanka, where there are also large festivals with elephant parades, the most famous of which is the so-called Kandy Esala Perahera and the Perahera of Kataragama. The processions of the Kandy Esala Perahera revolve around a sacred tooth relic of the Buddha, which is kept in the Sri Dalada Maligawa temple (or tooth temple) in Kandy; about 60 elephants are required to participate in the processions in July through August.

Only a few selected male elephants are allowed to wear the tooth reliquary: they must be very sociable and traditionally have certain physical characteristics - they must be particularly large, have long impressive tusks, and 7 points of the body (the 4 legs, the trunk, the penis and the tail) must all touch the ground at the same time. The corresponding elephants are assigned to a particular caste, are considered particularly noble and receive great respect. In the 20th and early 21st century, these included Maligawa Raja (around 1913–1988; from 1953 to 1986), Heiyantuduwa Raja († 2002; from 1991 to 2000) and Nadungamuwa Raja (1953–2022; from 2006 to 2021). After the death of Maligawa Raja in 1988, a national day of mourning was declared; later his body was stuffed and is on display in a special museum in the Temple of the Tooth. Nadungamuwa Raja was also stuffed in 2022 after a solemn state funeral following Buddhist rites on the orders of President Gotabaya Rajapaksa. Heiyantuduwa Raja was not just a temple or ceremonial elephant, but was also hired out for some films, including Indiana Jones; his skeleton is in the Colombo National Museum.

There have also been protests by animal rights activists against the abuse of Sri Lanka's temple elephants. In 2019, the case of the old female elephant Tikiri was reported in the press. Despite her alarmingly weakened and emaciated physical condition, which had been hidden by the glamorous full-body disguise, she had to participate in the Perahera in Kandy for the umpteenth time and for days on end and, according to a report by the Thai animal rights activist Lek Chailert, died just a few weeks later in September 2019.

In 2023, the case of a 29-year-old male temple elephant named Muthu Raja (‘Pearl King’ alias Sak Surin) made international headlines. Muthu Raja came to Sri Lanka in 2001 alongside two other elephants as a gift from the Thai royal family and lived there as a temple elephant in the Buddhist Kande Viharaya temple; he also took part in religious processions. Following allegations of neglect and abuse in the logging industry, the elephant - who suffered from several abscesses and a stiff leg from an untreated injury - was sent back to Thailand, where he was treated at the Thai Elephant Conservation Centre, Lampang. The case also led to diplomatic disgruntlement between the two countries.

== Myanmar ==
The Buddhist Uppatasanti Pagoda in Myanmar's capital Naypyidaw, inaugurated in 2009, keeps several white elephants on its grounds. These are revered as particularly sacred and precious not only in Myanmar, but throughout Southeast Asia, and may not be used for work. As a result, these elephants are not used for rituals, processions or blessings, but live near the pagoda in a separate compound similar to a zoo. However, stereotypical rocking back and forth was also observed in this case, which indicates that these elephants are obviously not kept optimally (e.g. on tight chains, on hard stone floors).

== Gallery on temple elephants ==
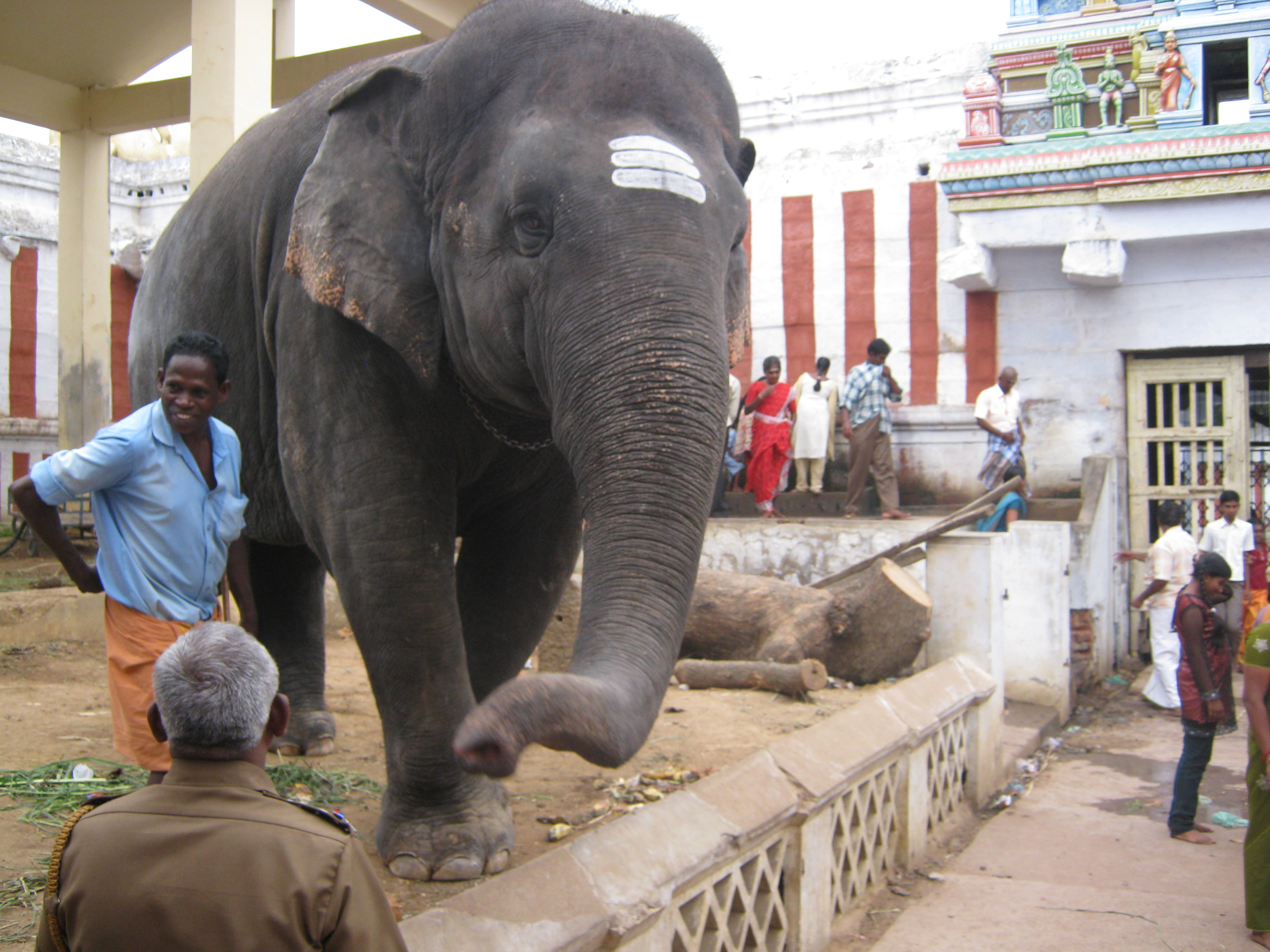
Temple elephant in Tamil Nadu

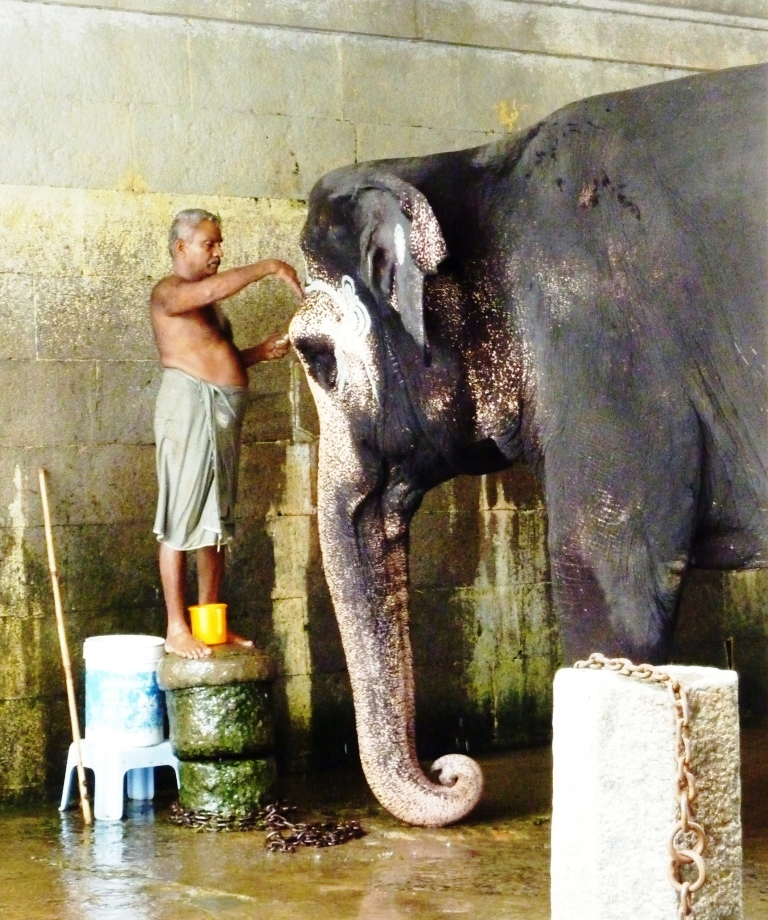
A mahout painting the forehead of his temple elephant, Kanchipuram, Tamil Nadu

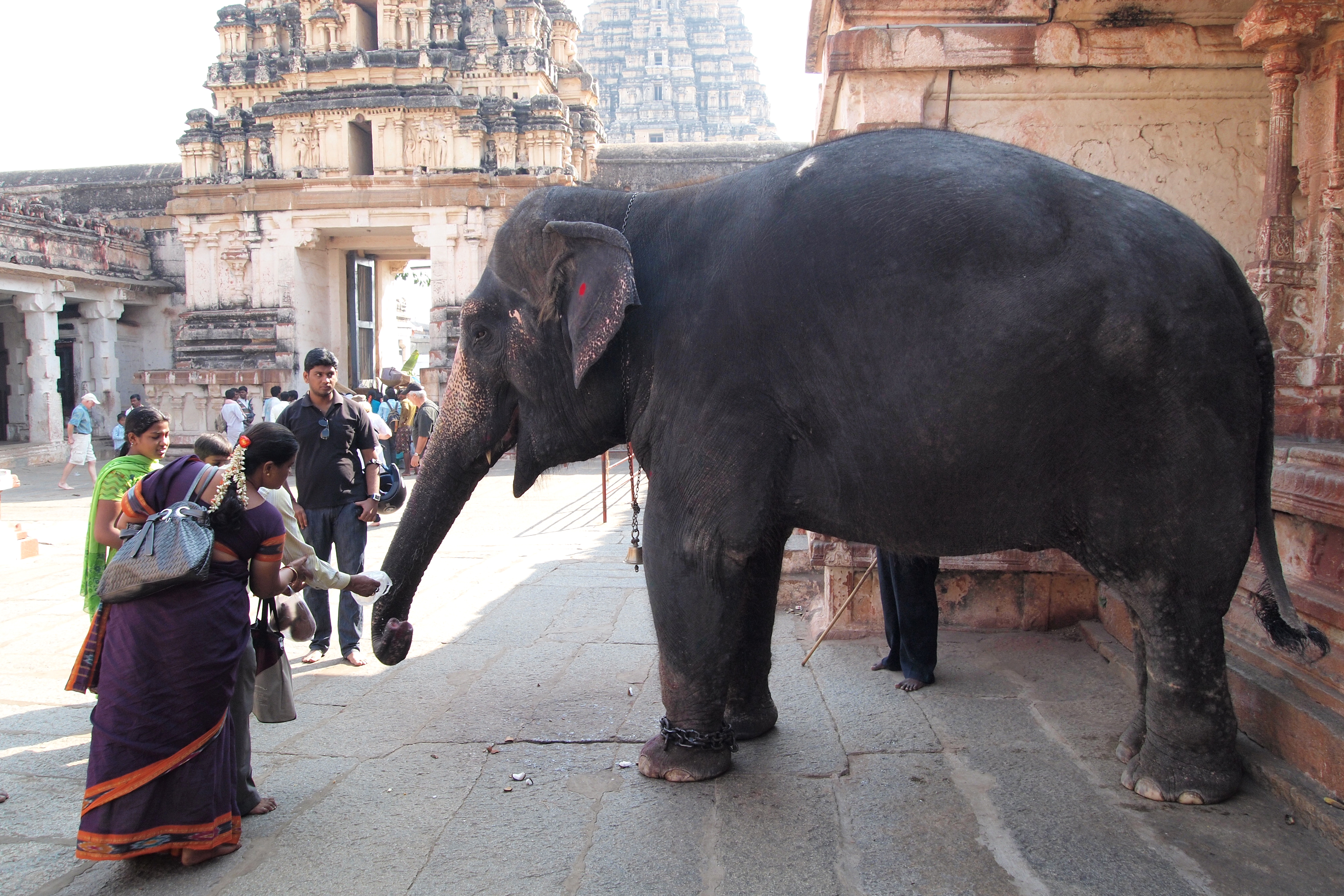
Temple elephant Lakshmi of Virupaksha Temple. Hampi, Karnataka.

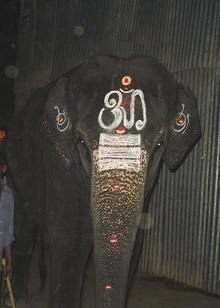
The temple elephant carries the idol of the Lord of Virupaksha. The procession goes around to receive the offerings from the devotees. Hampi, Karnataka.

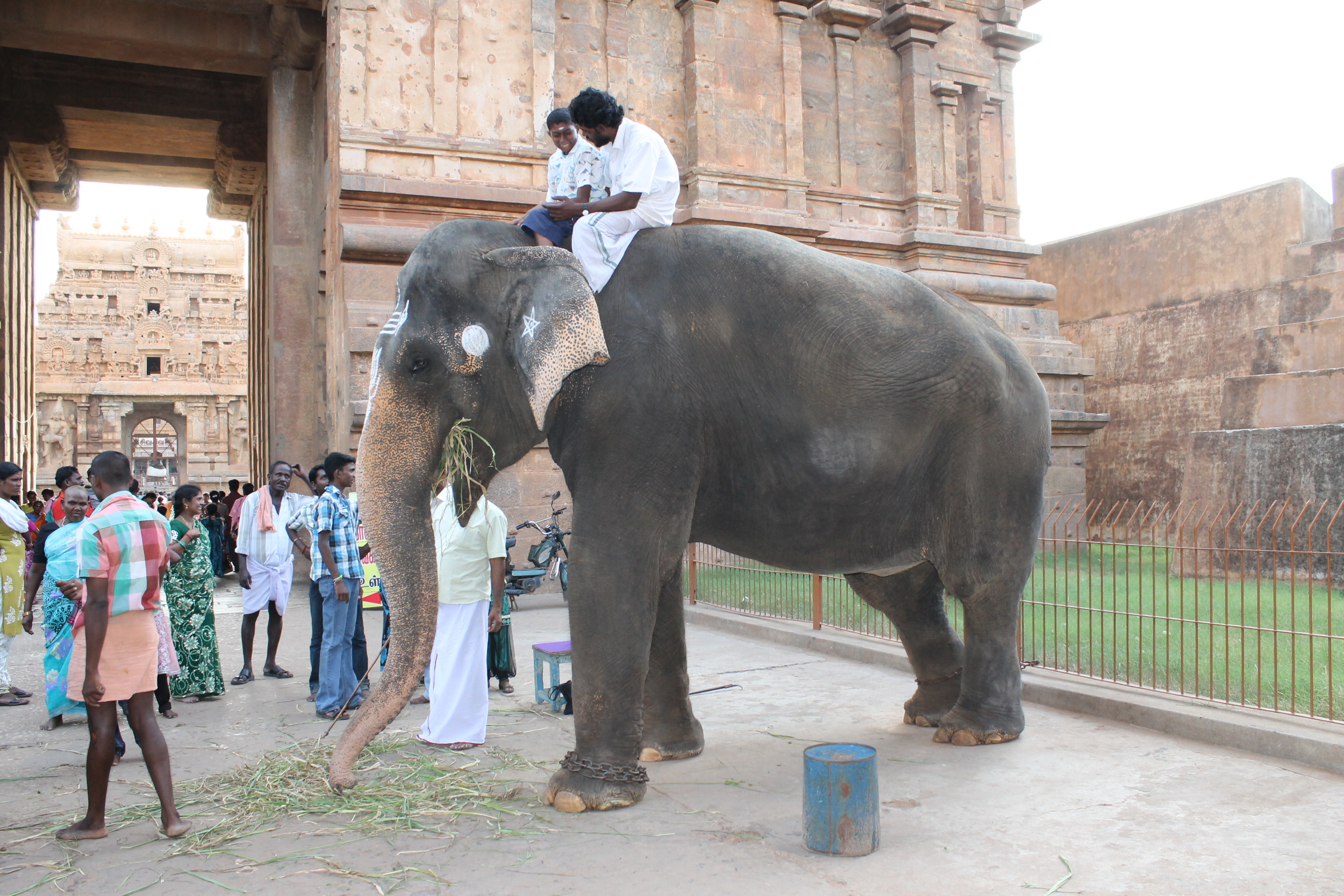
Temple elephant with devotees in the Brihadisvara Temple, Thanjavur, Tamil Nadu

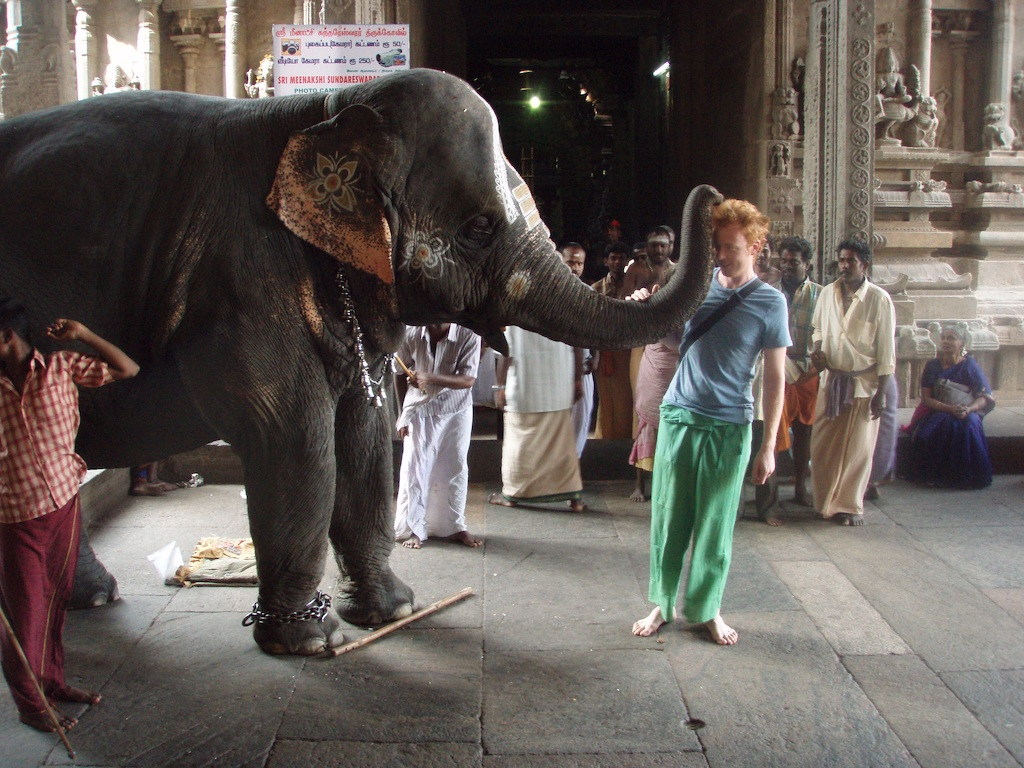
Temple elephant blesses a tourist at Meenakshi Temple, Madurai, Tamil Nadu

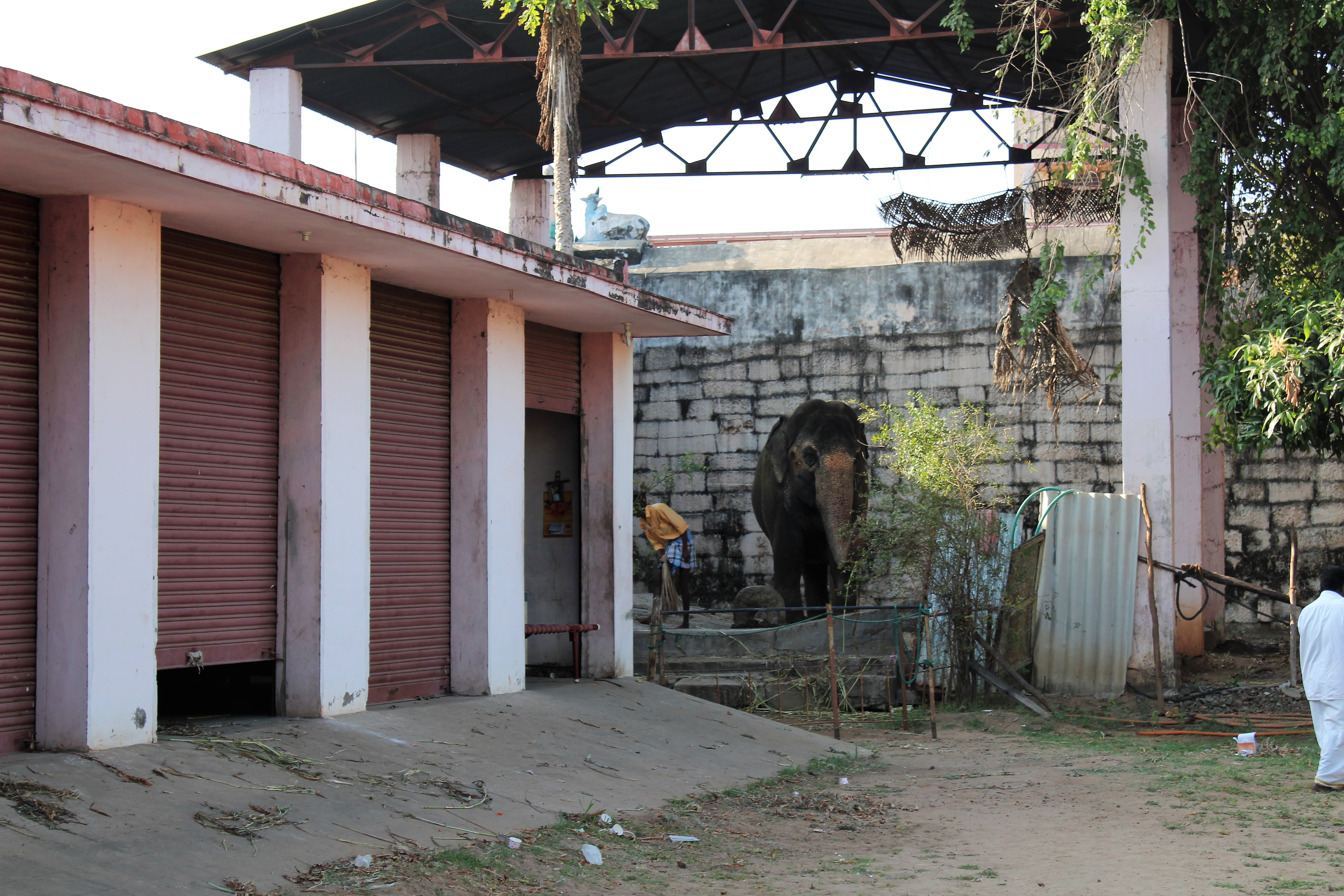
Temple elephant in her enclosure, Neyyadiyappar Temple, Thirupathur, Tamil Nadu

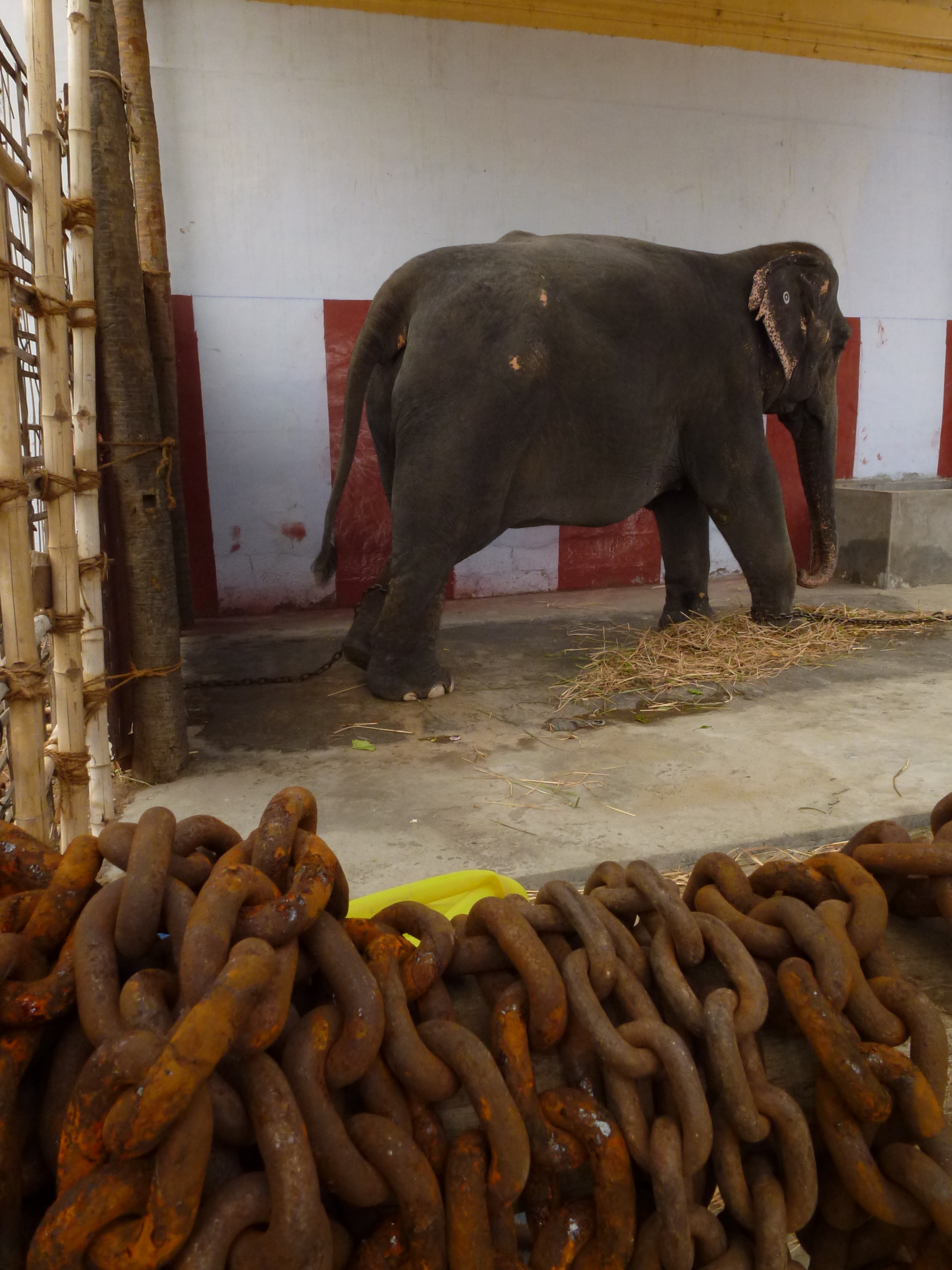
Temple elephant in her stable, Thiruvaiyaru Thanjavur, Tamil Nadu

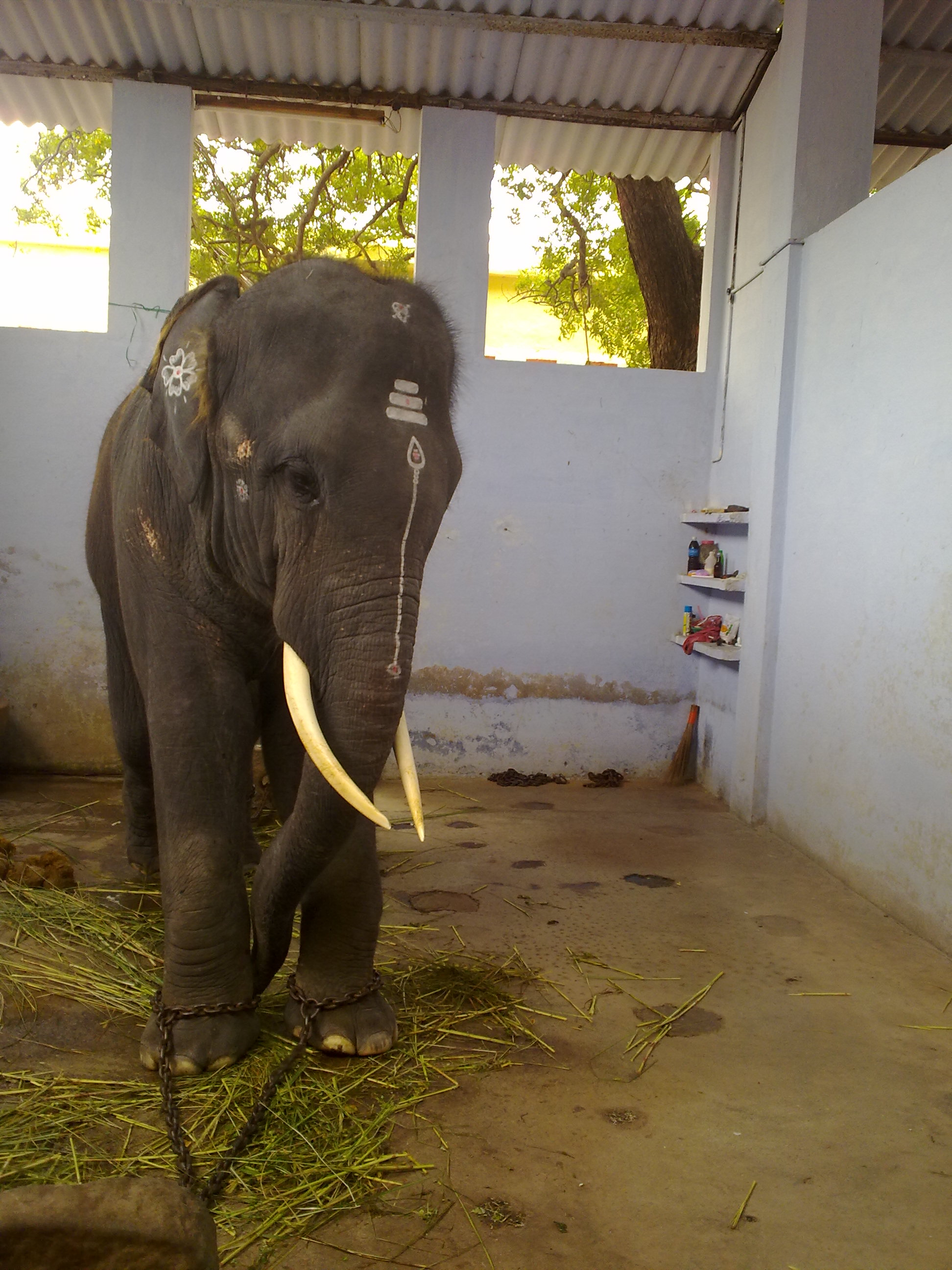
Chained temple elephant in its stable, Thiruchenthur Temple, Tamil Nadu

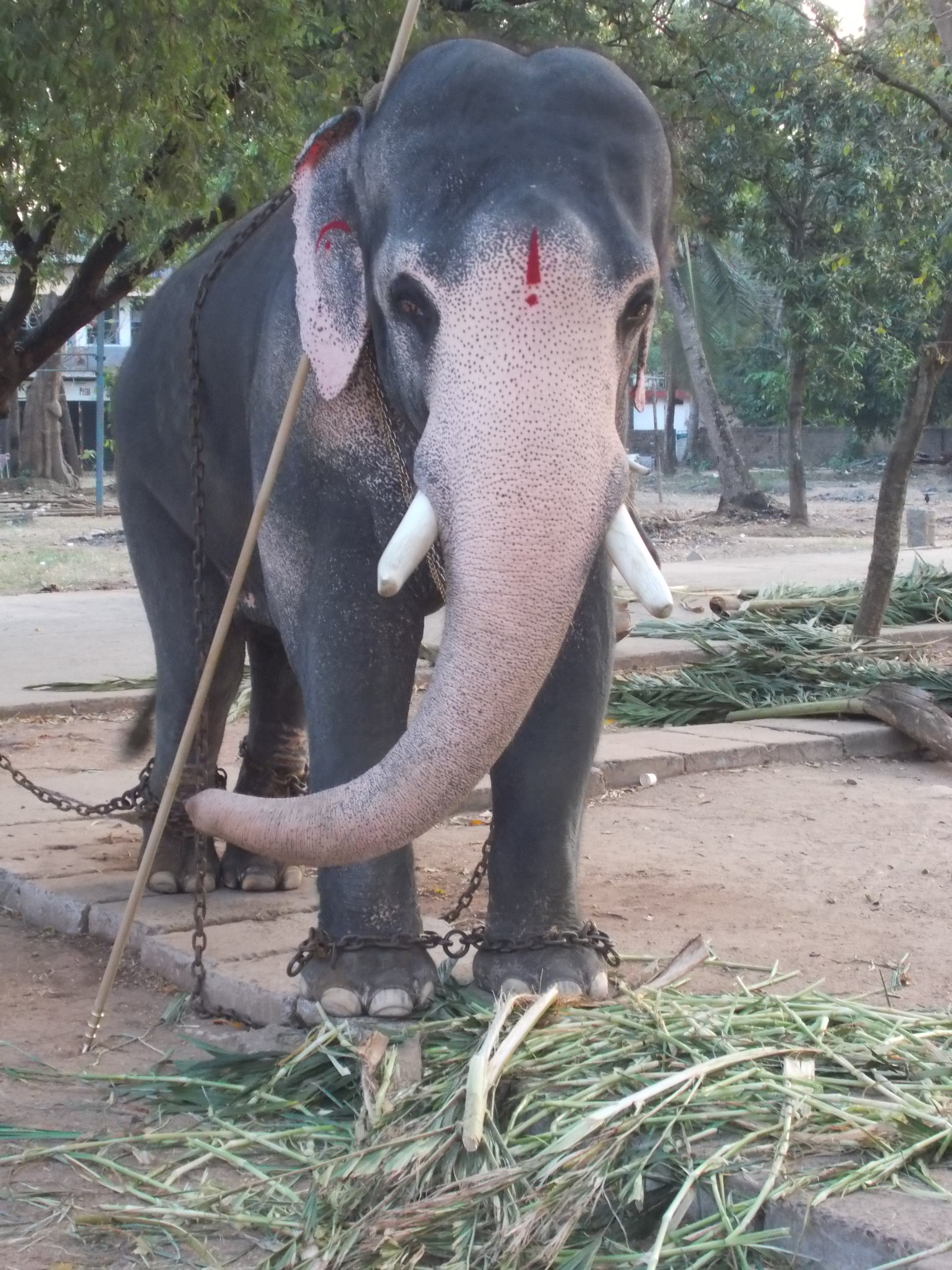
Elephant of the Guruvayur Temple (Thrissur, Kerala) in chains

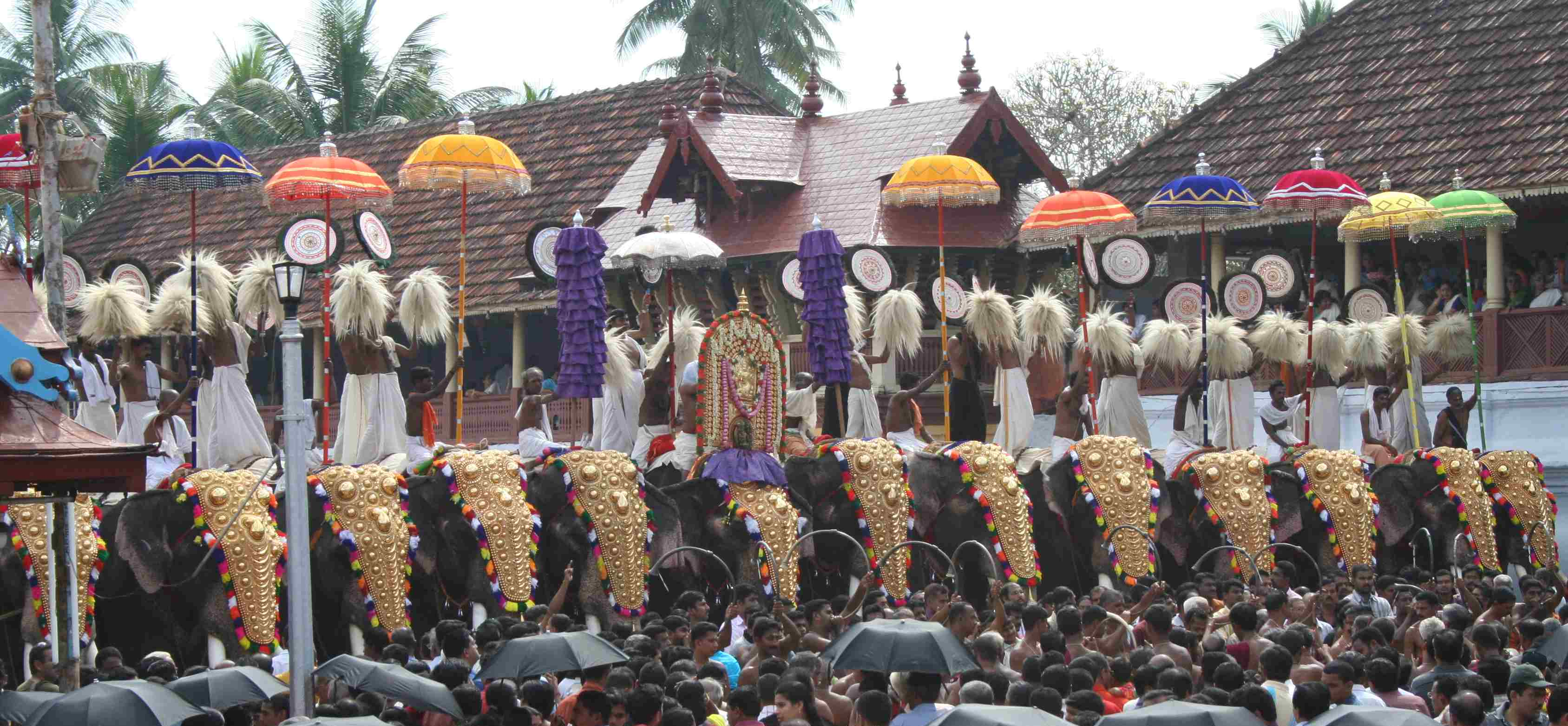
Elephant parade at the Sree Poornathrayeesa temple Festival in Thrippunithura, Kerala, 2007

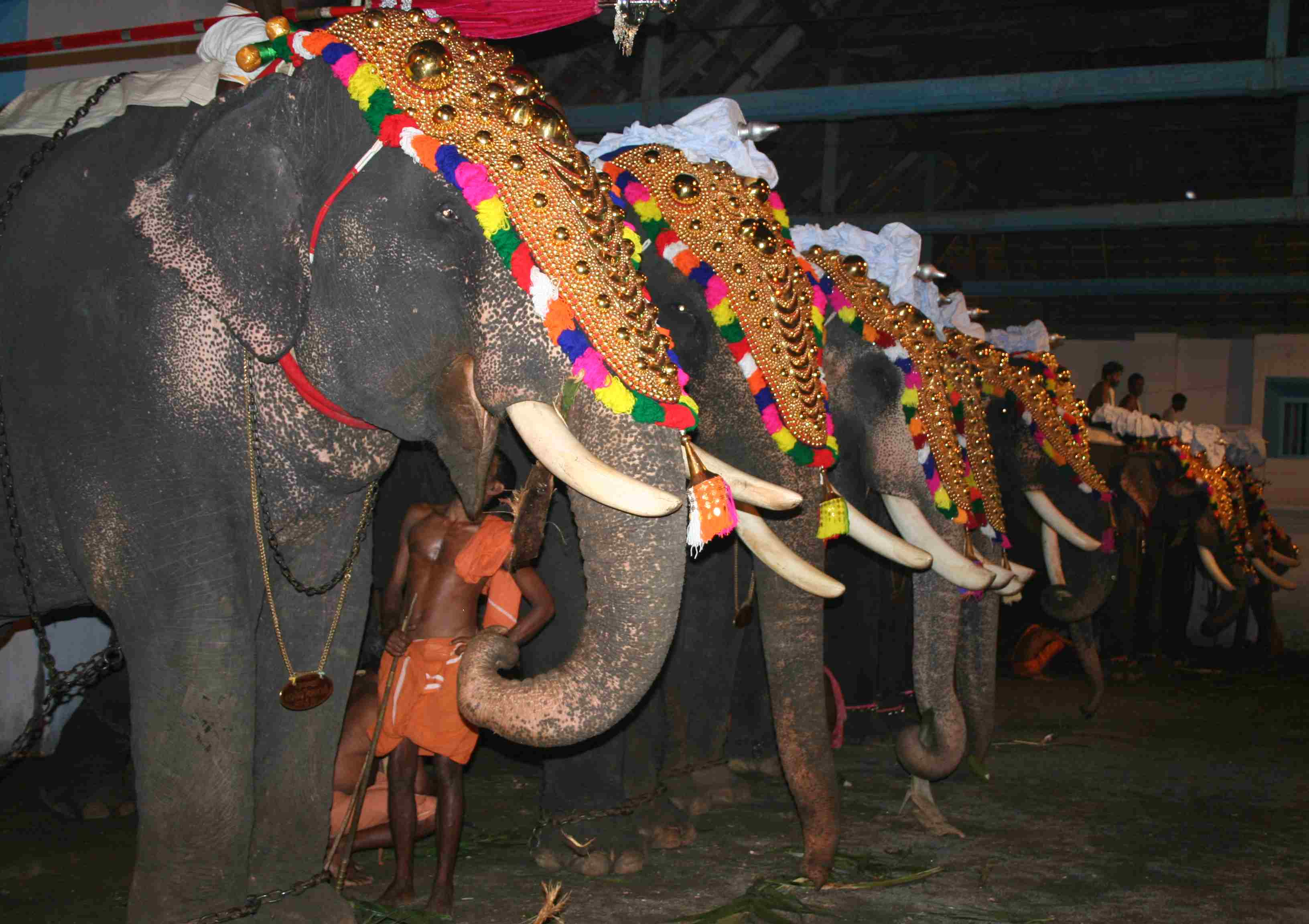
Caparisoned elephants during Sree Poornathrayesa temple festival.

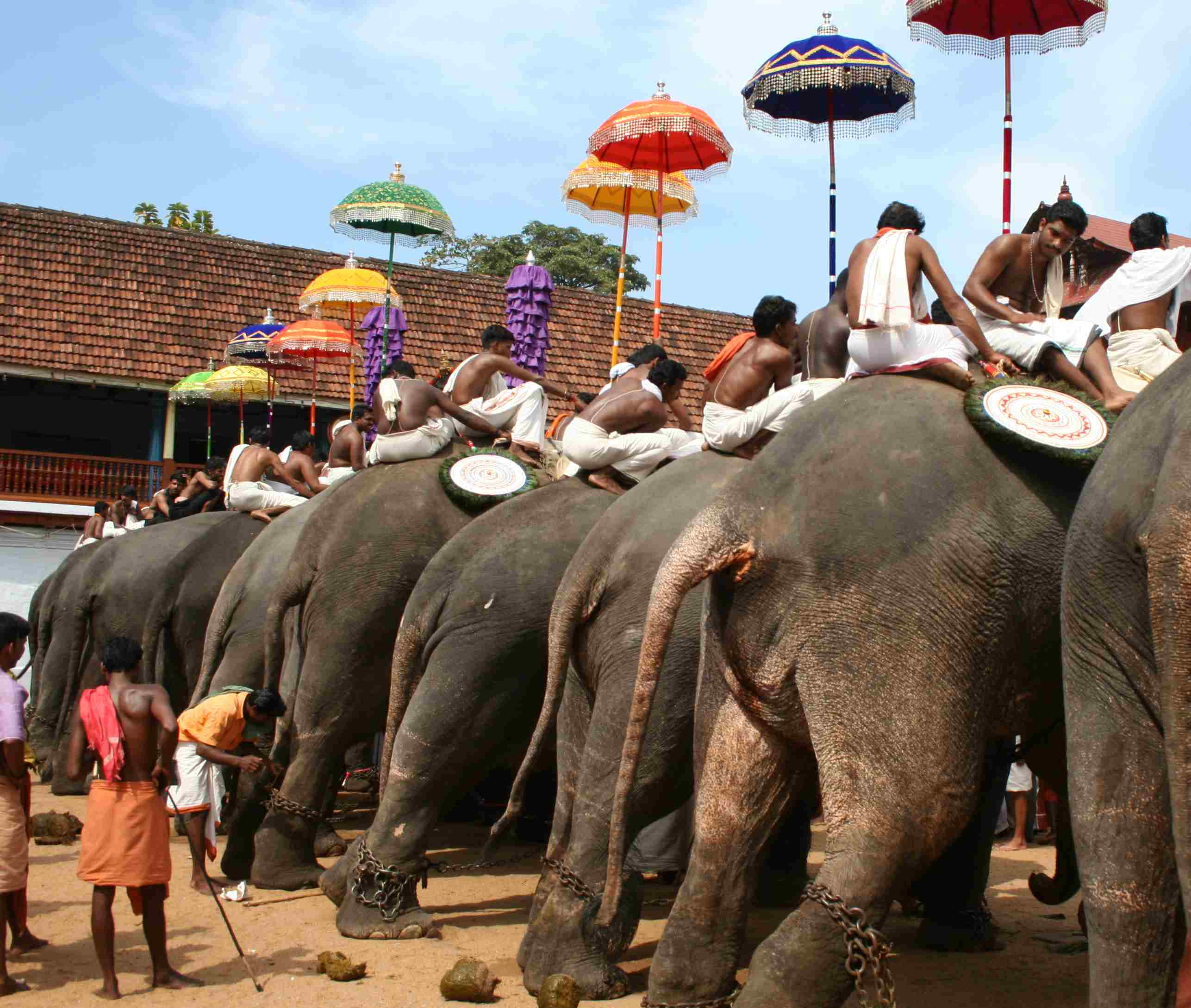
Caparisoned elephants during Sree Poornathrayesa temple festival.

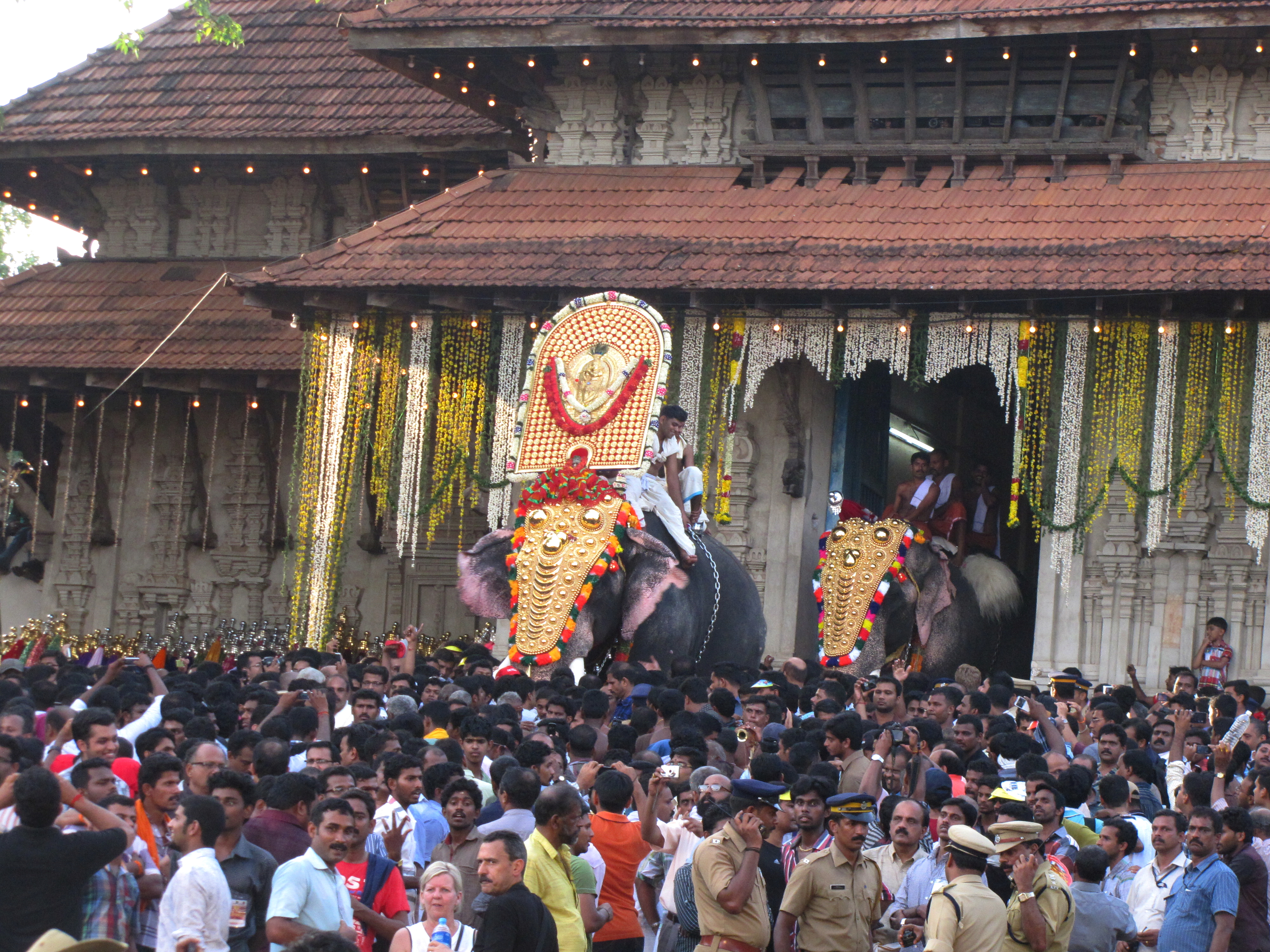
Elephants at the ritual opening of the temple gate, Thrissur Pooram Festival, Kerala

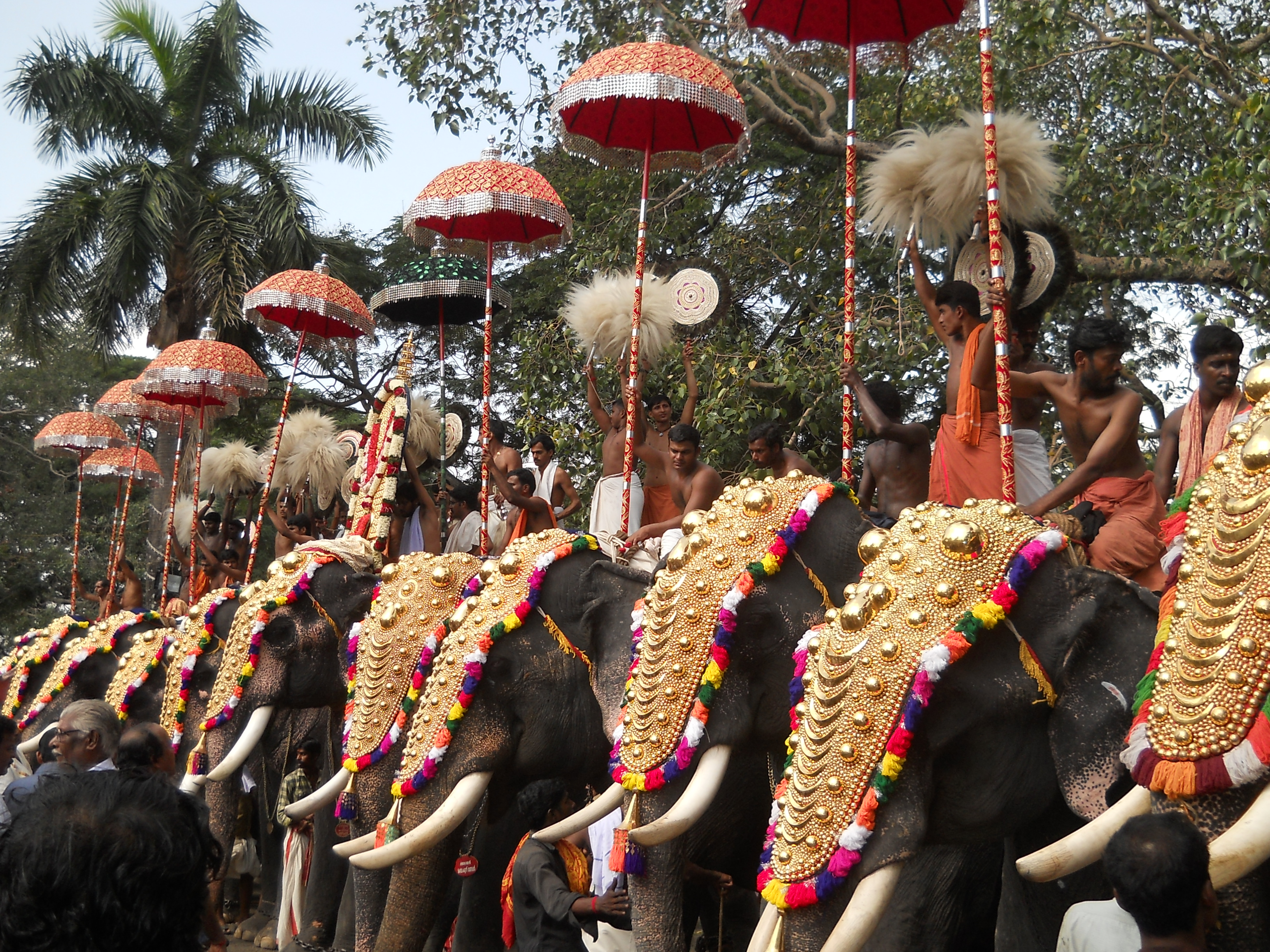
Elephant parade at the festival in Thrissur Pooram, Kerala, 2011

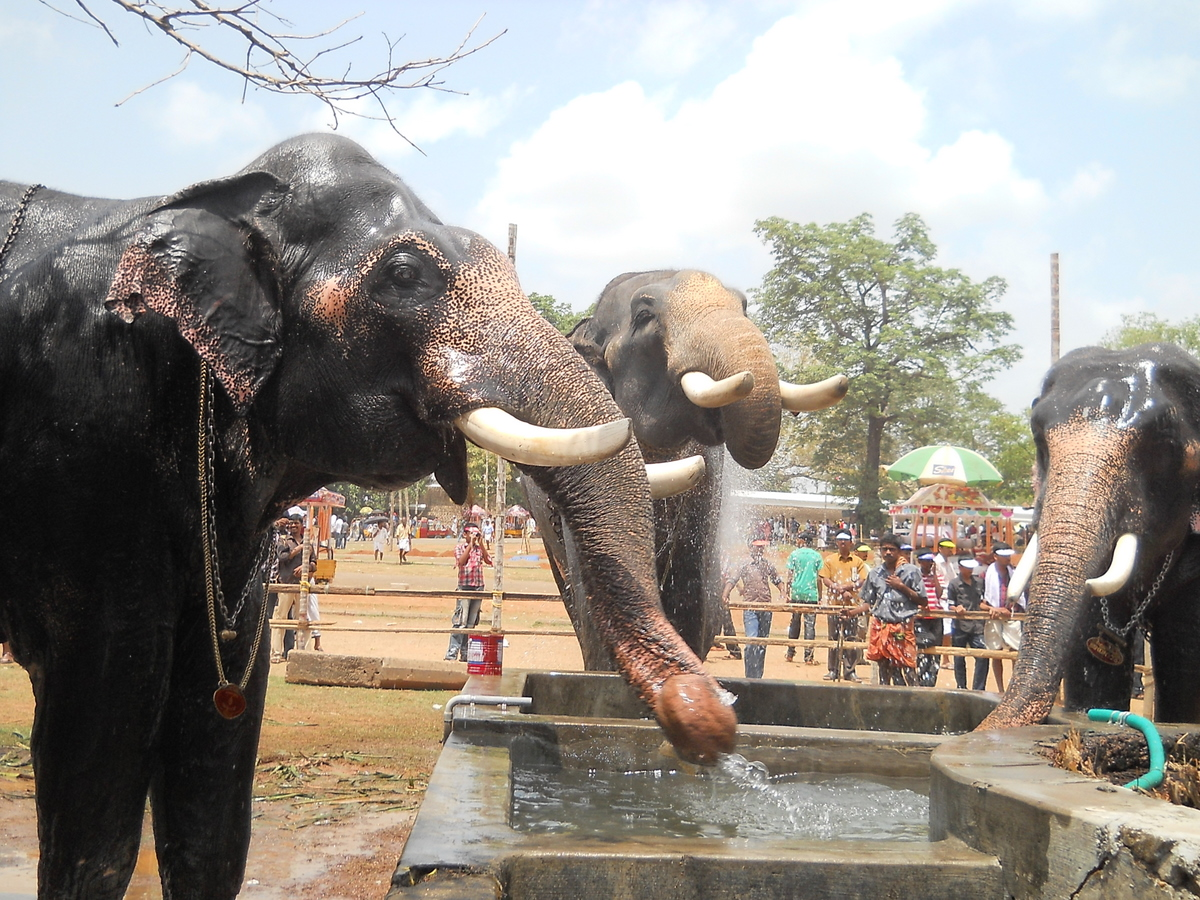
Elephants at the fountain during a break at the festival of Thrissur Pooram, Kerala

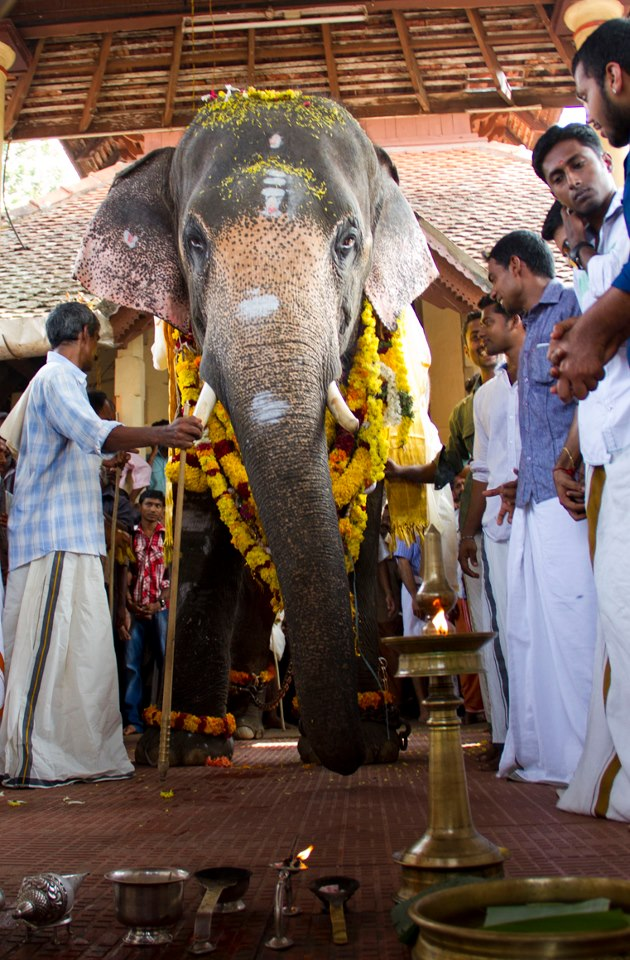
The temple elephant Thiru Vazhappally Mahadevan during a temple ritual, Kerala

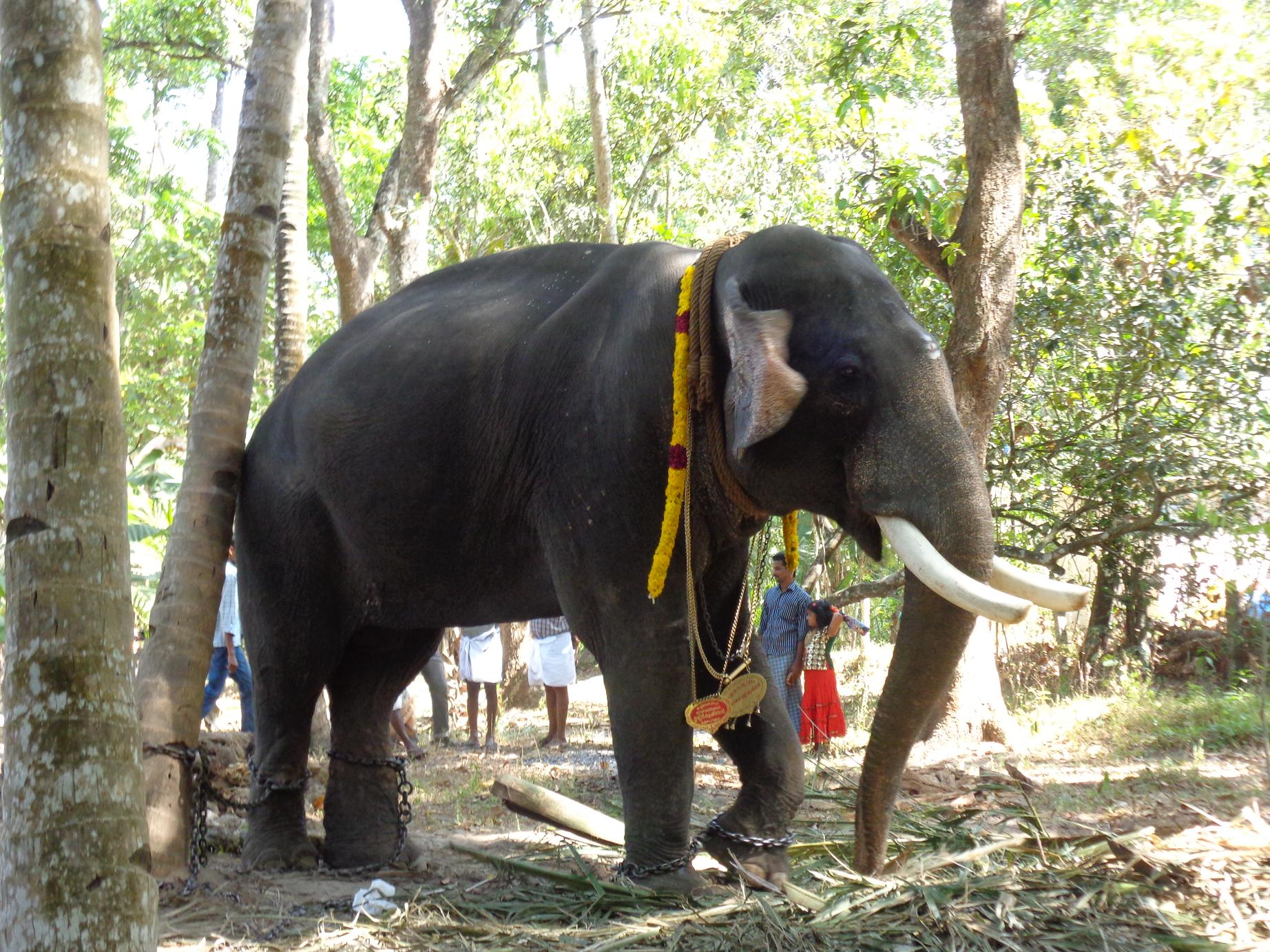
Unnikrishnan, the temple elephant of the Mavelikara Srikrishanswami temple, Kattuvalli, Kerala

== See also ==
- Airavata
- Ganesha
- Animal worship
- Guruvayur Keshavan
- Heiyantuduwa Raja
- Raja (elephant)
- Thrissur Pooram
