= Suparna =

Suparna may refer to:

- Garuda, a divine bird in Hindu and Buddhist mythology
- Suparna (film), a 2020 Sri Lankan film
- Suparna Airlines, an airline based in China
- Suparna Anand, Indian actress
- Suparna Baksi Ganguly, Indian animal rights activist
- Suparna Bhattacharya, Indian computer scientist
- Suparna Kanti Ghosh, Indian composer
- Suparna Marwah, Indian actress
- Suparna Rajaram, Indian psychologist
- Suparna Singh, Indian-American television executive
