= Gods in Shackles =

2016 Indian-Canadian drama documentary film directed by Sangita Iyer

- Directed by: Sangita Iyer
- Written by: Sangita Iyer; Digby Cook
- Produced by: Sangita Iyer
- Music by: Janal Bechthold
- Release dates: January 2016 (Canada); 21 May 2016 (India)
- Running time: 95 minutes
- Countries: India; Canada
- Language: English

Gods in Shackles is a 2016 Indian investigative drama feature-length documentary film written, directed and executive produced by Sangita Iyer on her documentary directorial debut. The documentary is based on the captive elephants in Kerala culture and inspired by the filmmaker's own personal experience witnessing the torture and suffering faced by the temple elephants during cultural festivals. The documentary was screened at the Legislative Assembly of Kerala on 21 May 2016 following a suggestion by speaker P. Sreeramakrishnan, who formally approved the release.

== Plot ==
The documentary opens with interviews featuring few notable Indian personalities such as Raman Sukumar, Jacob Cheeran, Sugadha Kumari and Akkeramon Kalidasan Bhattathiripad. The documentary exposes the ugly reality regarding elephant cruelty in Kerala and how the elephants are treated by their mahouts in an unfavourable way, with emphasis on the cultural festivals. It further elaborates on the lives of prominent individual elephants including Thiruvambadi Lakshmi, Thechikottukavu Ramachandran, Ollukkara Jayaram and Sunder.

== Production ==
The documentary was announced by Canada-based filmmaker Sangita Iyer, who was born in Pallakad, Kerala. She announced her plan in 2014 after acknowledging the torture faced by the elephants during a trip to India in December 2013. The filmmaker was convinced to make the documentary after watching the Thrissur Pooram Festival during her second visit to Kerala in May 2014.

In 2014, Sangita initially produced a five-minute trailer based on her experiences in December 2013, and launched a crowdfunding campaign for the project. Principal photography commenced in 2014 and was predominantly shot in Kerala. Certain portions of the documentary were shot and set in Thrissur and in few temples in Kerala such as Guruvayur Temple and Thiruvambadi Sri Krishna Temple. The production shot over 200 hours of footage including videos of ill-treated elephants in Kerala. Sangita stated that filming during the 2014 Thrissur Festival could not be used and that mahouts of the elephants disrupted the shooting procedure. The film's poster has the title in Devanagari font style, chosen by Sangita, with the tagline "Born to Roam Wild not Stand Chained".

== Release ==
The documentary was premiered at several international film festivals. It was nominated by the International Elephant Film Festival at the UN General Assembly and was also nominated at the Jackson Wild in March 2016. It was also screened in the 47th edition of the International Film Festival of India in 2016. It was screened at the 2016 CayFilm International Film Festival, and at the Arya Vaidya Sala in January 2019.

== Accolades ==
The documentary received several awards and nominations from international film festivals. The documentary won the best feature documentary at the 2016 Cayman Islands International Film Festival. It also won the Golden Award at the World Documentary Awards.
