= Sangita Iyer =

Indian-born Canadian wildlife activist, journalist, biologist and filmmaker

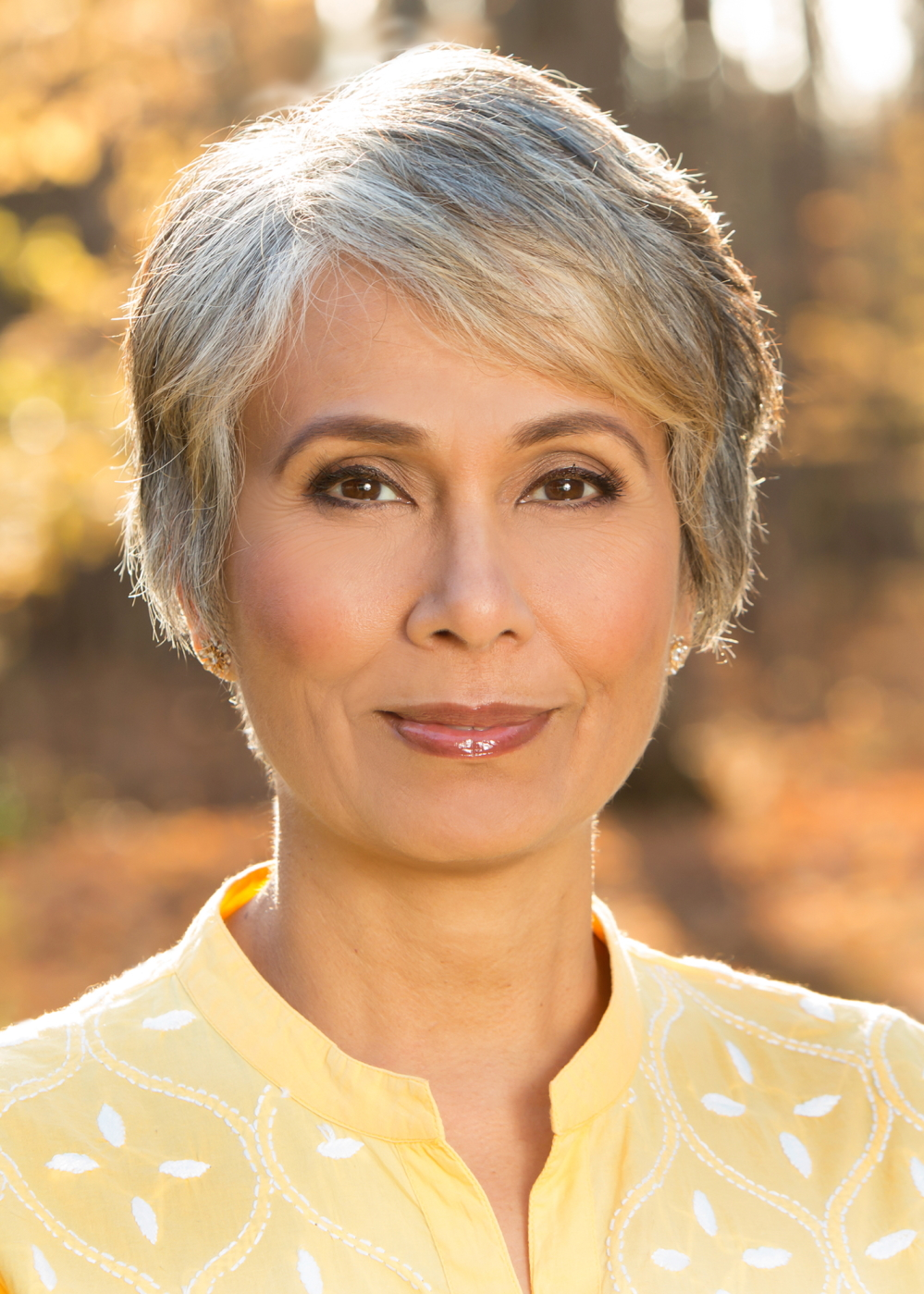
- Born: Sangita Iyer; Kerala, India
- Citizenship: Canadian
- Occupations: Author, Wildlife Filmmaker, Broadcast Journalist, and Biologist
- Website: www.vfaes.org/more-about-sangita

Sangita Iyer is an Indian-born Canadian author, broadcast journalist, writer, biologist, documentary filmmaker, and environmental educator. She is advocate for wildlife conservation, especially for wild elephants. She is the founding executive director and president of the Voice for Asian Elephants Society, which was created in 2016 with the aim of protecting wild and captive elephants of India.

Iyer's debut documentary film, Gods in Shackles, was based on the treatment of captive elephants in Kerala. The film was nominated for portraying the torture stories of captive elephants in the name of festivals at the United Nations General Assembly, featured at the International Film Festival of India (IFFI) and has received over a dozen international film festival awards. The documentary was inspired by the encounters and witnesses gathered by Iyer. Here recently released book, Gods in Shackles - What Elephants Can Teach us About Empathy, Resilience and Freedom ranked the #1 Best Seller list on Amazon, since its release on February 8, 2022. She is also a National Geographic explorer, and has produced a 26-part short documentary series about Asian elephants, using the National Geographic Society storytelling award.

== Early life and education ==
Sangita Iyer was born in Kerala, India. Iyer pursued her career in journalism in 1999 as a health and environmental journalist. She completed her MA degree in environmental education and communication in 2012. She has also completed post graduate studies in Broadcast Journalism.

== Career ==
Iyer worked in Kenya, where she taught at a Nairobi girl’s secondary school. She produced reports related to nature and wildlife for Discovery Channel science-news programme Daily Planet. She moved to Toronto, and worked at CTV Toronto, and afterwards as a videographer at OMNI Television, followed by her role as a broadcaster and anchor at ZBM Bermuda, an ABC/CBS affiliate, from 2004 to 2008. In 2009, She co-founded the Bermuda Environmental Alliance, which wounded up in 2014. She founded the Voice for Asian Elephants Society in 2016.

=== Film making ===
In 2013, Iyer began to document the elephants in Kerala that are exploited by religious institutions, and created the documentary film Gods in Shackles (2016), which portrays the suffering of temple elephants during cultural festivals. She decided to make the film after witnessing the torture faced by the elephants during a trip to India in December 2013. The documentary, which she produced and directed between 2013 and 2016, was opened to positive reviews from critics, nominated at the United Nations General Assembly and won 13 international film festival awards.

== Book ==
- Gods in Shackles: What Elephants Can Teach Us About Empathy, Resilience, and Freedom

== Awards and recognition ==
- DeForest Trimingham Award from Bermuda National Trust. (2008)
- Nari Shakti Puraskar award from the then Indian President Pranab Mukherjee. (2016)
- Rang the Closing Bell at NASDAQ to usher in World Elephant Day 2023, and 2014.

== Controversies ==
In November 2019, a petition was filed by Viswa Gaja Seva Samithi organisation in the Kerala High Court to prevent Iyer from conducting a mahout (elephant care) training summit called "Gentle Giants Summit" at a government-owned elephant rehabilitation centre in Thiruvananthapuram. The plea claimed that she was a foreign national in contrast to the national policies and was also accused of misusing the official emblem of Kerala state government in the brochures for the three-day workshop. On 28 February 2025, the Kerala High Court noted that based on the affidavit filed by the State government, the apprehension raised, against Sangita Iyer and the summit, in the petition, unwarranted. However, Iyer presented her Overseas Citizenship of India (OCI) card, affording her the privileges of Indian citizens, and the Kerala Forest Department had granted her the use of its emblem in their partnership on the summit. She was cyberbullied on social media and was accused of being a member of the Foreign Contribution (Regulation) Act (FCRA) mafia, in addition to insults and offensive remarks.

== Personal life ==
She currently lives in Toronto, Canada.

== See also ==
- List of people from Kerala
