= Suparna Baksi Ganguly =

Indian animal rights activist

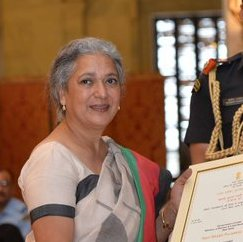
- Ganguly in 2016
- Occupations: Environmentalist, animal activist
- Known for: Nari Shakti Puraskar award

Suparna Baksi Ganguly is an Indian activist concerned with the treatment of animals and in particular elephants that are held captive. She was given the highest award for women in India, the Nari Shakti Puraskar in 2016.

== Life ==
In 1991 she was one of the founders of the Compassion Unlimited Plus Action (CUPA), founded in Bengaluru (Bangalore). She became a trustee and CUPA's secretary. That organisation was operating four centres that rescue and rehabilitate monkeys, snakes, birds and other wildlife.

In 1999 she co-founded the Wildlife Rescue and Rehabilitation Center (WRRC) and became its honorary president.

Ganguly had served on India's Task Force on Elephants in 2013. Elephants are under threat in India, but they are more common in India. However Ganguly notes that this includes about 4,000 animals who are held in captivity and "almost all" have been illegally trafficked. Many are involved in entertaining tourists where elephants take part in tugs of war, football matches or are painted. Ganguly notes that elephants have a special place in the affection of the people of India.

In March 2016 Ganguly went to New Delhi, where she was awarded the highest award for women in India, the Nari Shakti Puraskar. The awards were made by President Pranab Mukherjee at the presidential palace (Rashtrapati Bhavan). The Ministry of Women and Child Development had organised the event and the WCD Minister Maneka Gandhi was present and she identified every winner as the "Woman Power" award as an inspiration.

In 2016 the WRRC petitioned the Supreme Court of India to rule that keeping elephants captive was illegal.

In 2019 she was commenting when the traditional Rajasthan festival where elephants are painted to take part in competitions to judge the best one. The festival was shut down. Photographs of the painted evidence had caused an outcry by animal rights activists. Some defended the painting on the grounds that it was a tradition, but she replied that animal rights was more important than tradition.
