= Veekku chenda =

Malayali Indian musical instrument

Chenda Melam

Pandi Melam

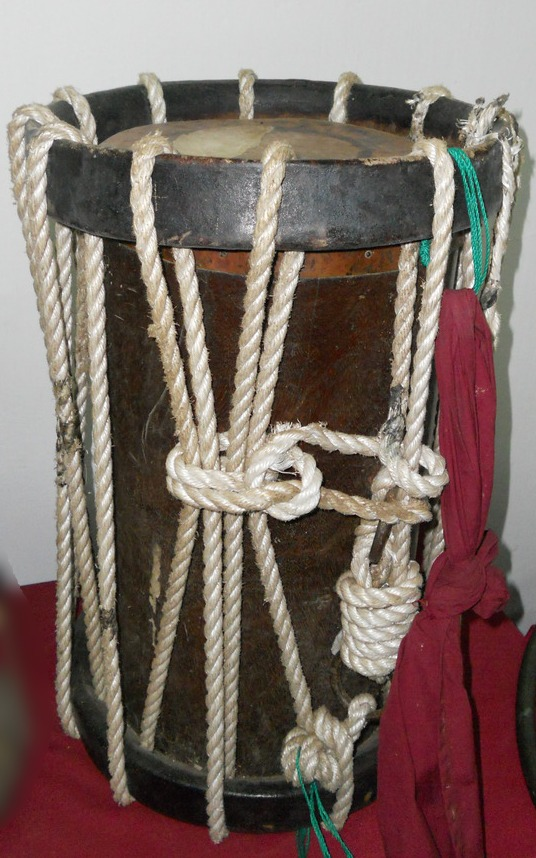
Chenda

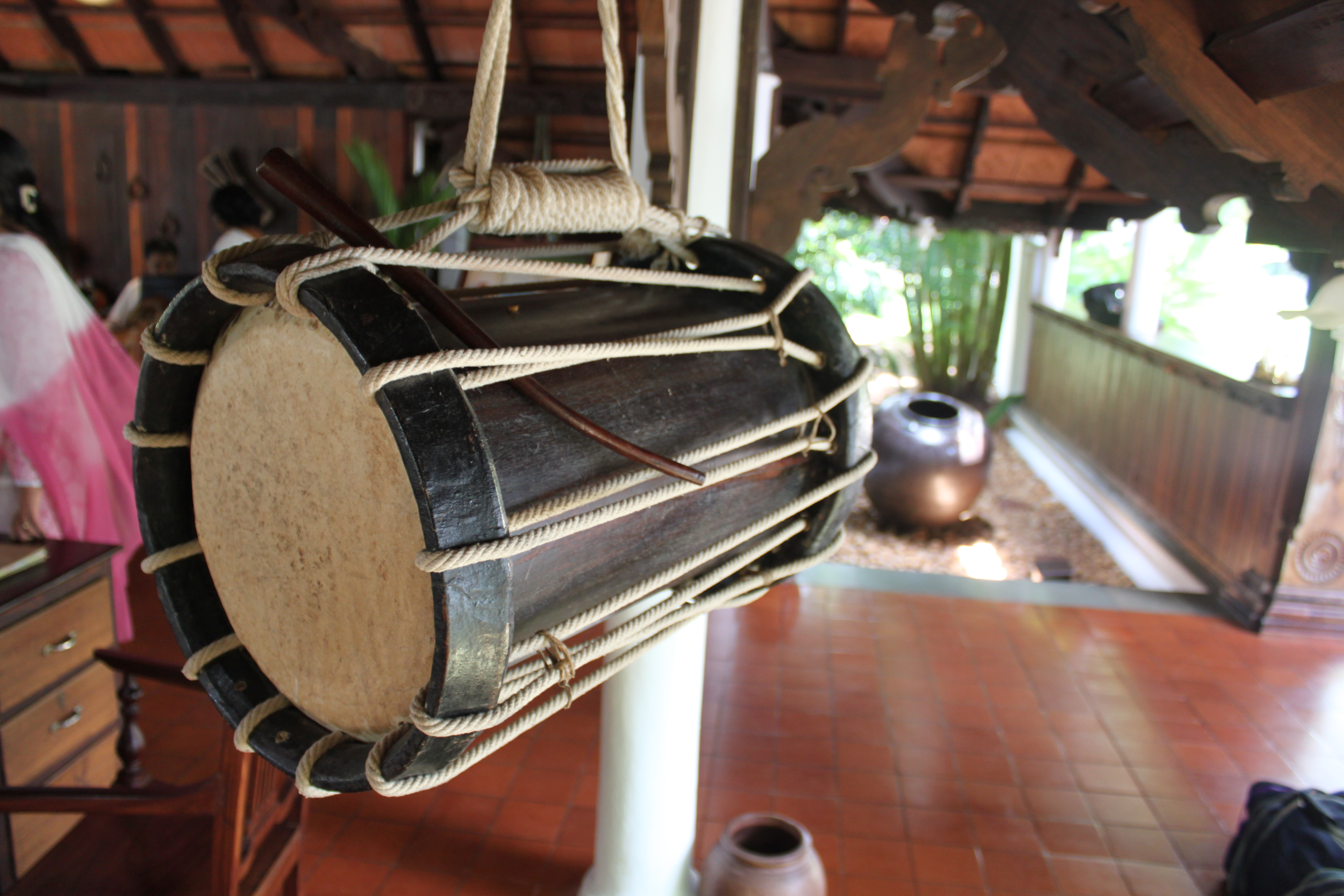
Chenda and Koal (stick)

Veekku chenda (വീക് ചെണ്ട) or "Acchan chenda" (അച്ഛൻ ചെണ്ട) is a type of Chenda or drum used to keep the "thalam" or the basic rhythm while playing the Chenda. The "Chenda Vattam" of the "Veekku Chenda" is always the "Valam Thala" or the "Right Head" which is made of multiple layer of skin to produce a bass sound. The meaning of "Veekku" in Malayalam language is "beating hard". The artist produces sound on "Veekku Chenda" by hitting the drum using a stick without twisting or rolling his wrist.

The Chenda is a cylindrical percussion instrument used widely in the state of Kerala, and Tulu Nadu of Karnataka State in India. In Tulu Nadu it is known as chande. It has a length of two feet and a diameter of one foot. Both ends are covered (usually with animal's skin) with the "Chenda Vattam". The animal skin is usually of a cow (Heifer), in a traditional Chenda other skins are not used (skin of bull, ox etc. are not used), to have a quality sound the skin from the abdominal part of the cow is taken. The Chenda is suspended from the drummers neck so that it hangs vertically. Though both sides can be used for playing, only one is actually beaten. Using two sticks, the drummer strikes the upper parchment.

Depending upon the size, structure and function of the Chenda, they are classified as, "Veekku Chenda", "Uruttu Chenda", "Muri Chenda" etc.

== See also ==
- Chenda
- Uruttu Chenda
- Panchavadyam
- Thayambaka
- Panchari melam
- Pandi melam
- Kanyarkali
