= Uruttu chenda =

Type of drum

Pandi Melam

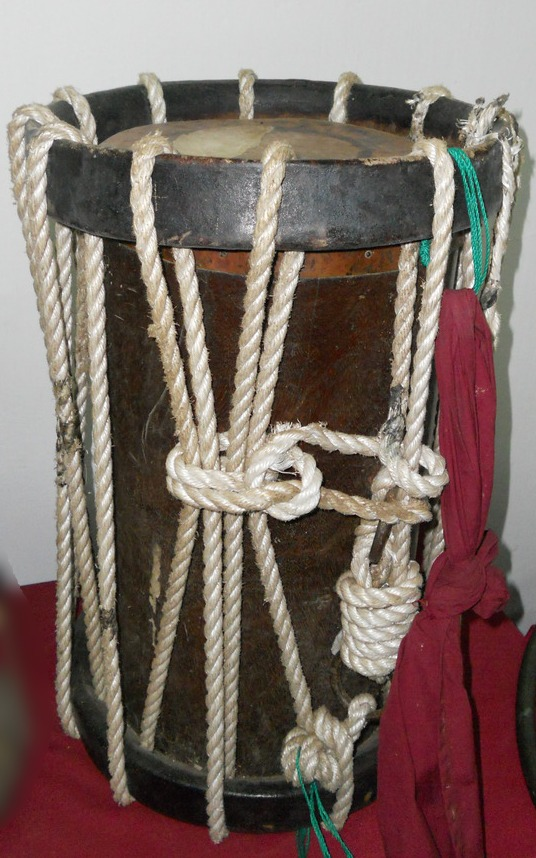
Chenda

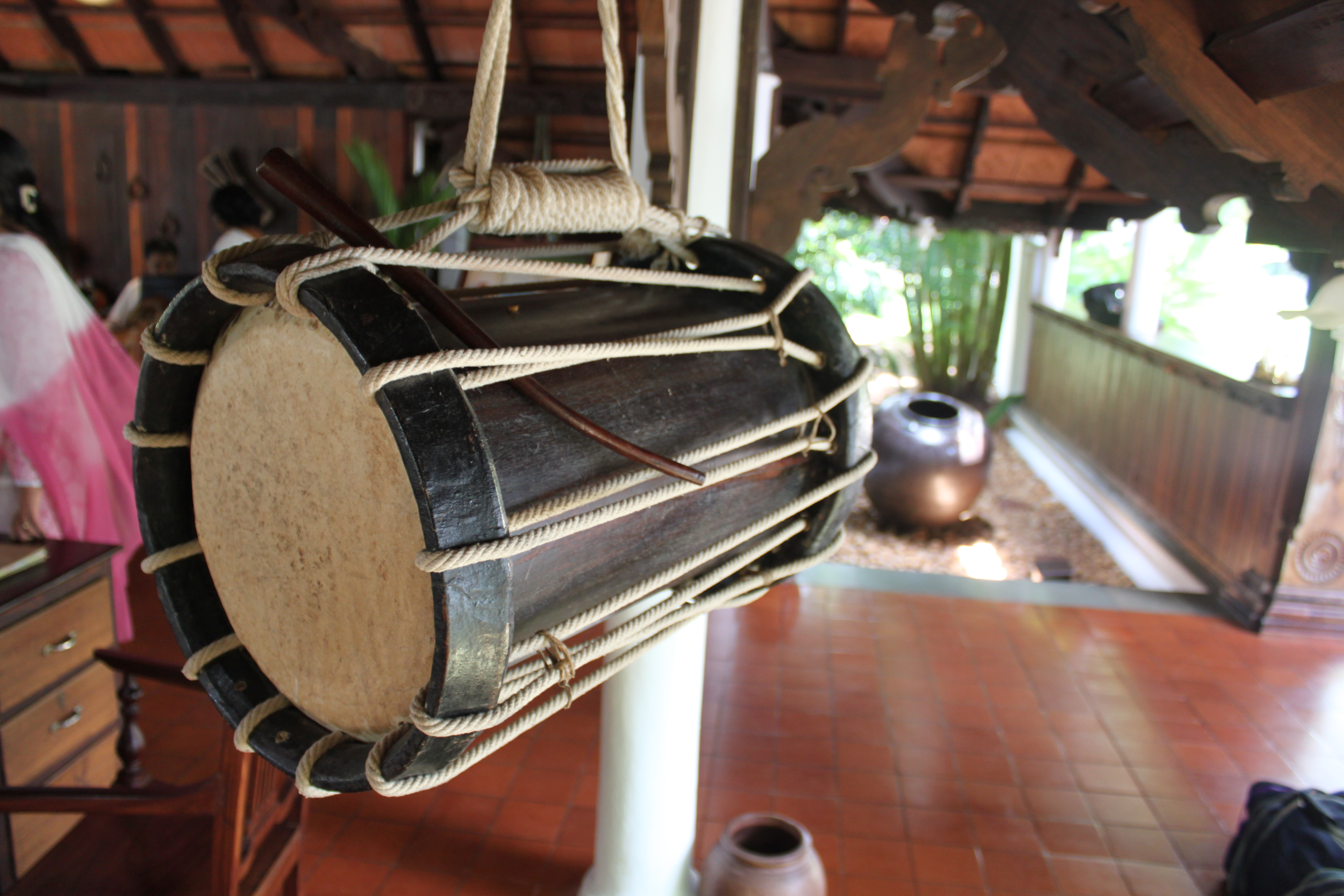
Chenda and Koal (stick)

Uruttu chenda (ഉരുട്ട് ചെണ്ട) is a type of "Chenda" or drum used to play variations in Chenda music. It is used to lead the orchestra. It is called the ""Pramanavadhya"" (Leading instrument). The "Chenda Vattam" of the "Uruttu Chenda" is always the "Edam Thala" or the "Left Head" which is made of soft, single cow skin. The meaning of "uruttu" in Malayalam language is "rolling". The artist produces sound on "Uruttu Chenda" by rolling his right hand wrist. During the first beat the palm holding the stick will face the artist (in), then during the second beat (using the same right hand) the palm would face the opposite side (out). This is done by rolling the wrist.

The Chenda is a cylindrical percussion instrument used widely in the state of Kerala, and Tulu Nadu of Karnataka State in India. In Tulu Nadu it is known as chande. It has a length of two feet and a diameter of one foot. Both ends are covered (usually with animal's skin) with the "Chenda Vattam". The animal skin is usually of a cow (Heifer), in a traditional Chenda other skins are not used (skin of bull, ox etc. are not used), to have a quality sound the skin from the abdominal part of the cow is taken. The Chenda is suspended from the drummers neck so that it hangs vertically. Though both sides can be used for playing, only one is actually beaten. Using two sticks, the drummer strikes the upper parchment.

Depending upon the size, structure and function of the Chenda, they are classified as, "Veekku Chenda" or "Acchan Chenda", "Uruttu Chenda", "Muri Chenda" etc.

== See also ==
- Chenda
- Veekku Chenda
- Panchavadyam
- Thayambaka
- Panchari melam
- Pandi melam
- Kanyarkali
