= Kalpathy Balakrishnan =

Indian musician

- Born: kalpathy, palakkad, Kerala, India
- Years active: 1990 – present

Kalpathy Balakrishnan is an Indian percussionist who plays the chenda (a traditional Kerala drum), Thayambaka, Panchari melam, and Panchavadyam. He was born in the village called Kalpathy in the Palakkad district of Kerala. He won the Kerala Sangeetha Nataka Akademi Award for the best thayambaka artist in 2009.
