= Elathalam =

Metallic musical instrument

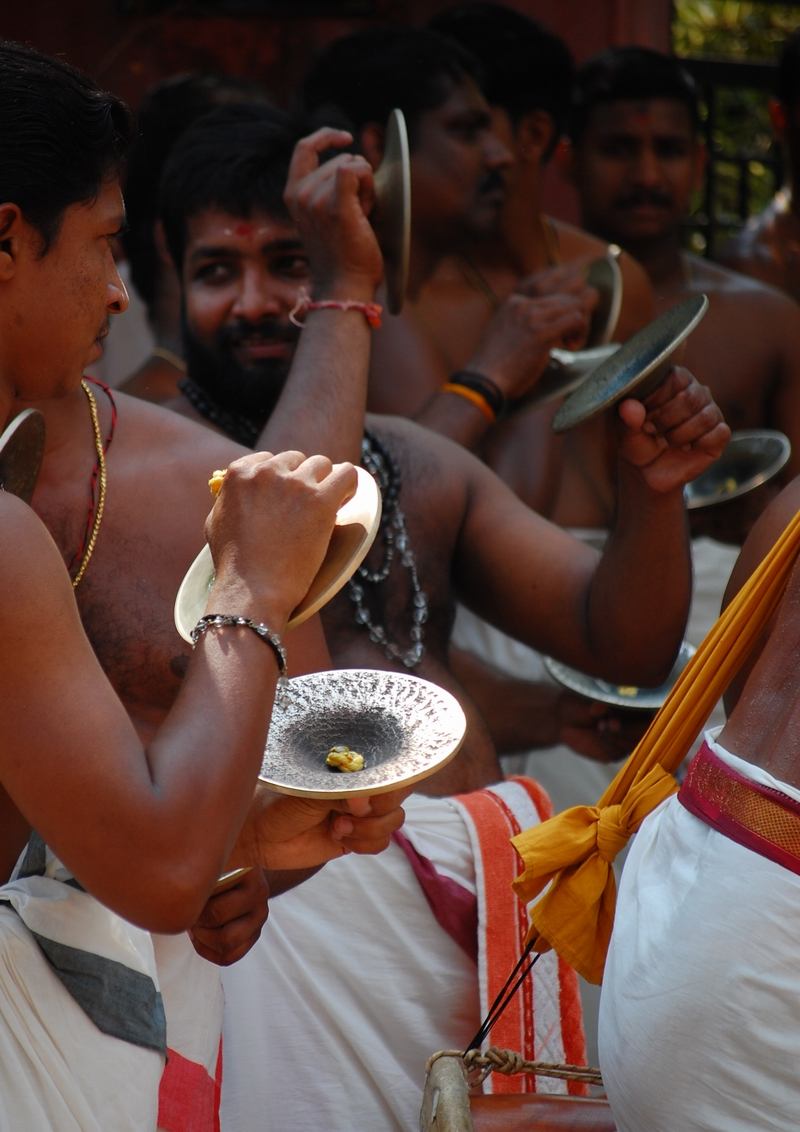
An artist using Ilathalam

Elathalam, ilatalam or ilathalam is a musical instrument from Kerala in southern India. It is made completely of bronze and resembles a miniature pair of cymbals, played by holding one part in the left hand and banging the other cymbal against it. Although small in size, it is thicker than common cymbals, with a distinct chime.

Elathalam is never a lead instrument, but is used in a number of ethnic Kerala percussion ensembles including Panchavadyam, Chenda melam, Thayambaka and Kailaya vathiyam, as well as by a second singer on a Kathakali stage and providing the beat in Kuzhal Pattu and Kombu Pattu.

Pair cymbals or cymbals arecounter-strike idiophones, which are classified as ghana vadya ("fixed instrument") in ancient Indian Sanskrit literature, summarized in the work Natyashastra, which was written around the turn of the era. Among the relatively few depictions of idiophones from ancient Indian times are cymbals and bells (bells or rattles). Rattle rings worn by dancers on their ankles are particularly common, while other rattles were shaken with hands while dancing, according to the illustrations. In Indian literature, Sanskrit tala, Tamil talam, refers to the rhythmic structure of music, the rhythmic clapping of hands and at the same time metal cymbals or cymbals to indicate the beat. Cymbals have always been part of religious music and dance accompaniment. The oldest basins came to light during excavations of the Indus culture. In the drama Mrcchakatika, which may have been written between the 3rd and 5th centuries AD and is said to have been written by an otherwise unknown king Shudraka, the music played in the house of a rich courtesan is praised. The dancers were accompanied by drums (mridangam) and cymbals (kansya tala), and the sweet sounds of flutes (vamshi) and harps (vina) could also be heard.

In the middle of the 1st millennium AD, parts of Southeast Asia were under the influence of Indian culture, which was spread along the shipping trade routes. The oldest find of a musical instrument in a shipwreck in Asian waters is a single basin. The ship, which sank off the east coast of Sumatra around the middle of the 9th century, is the earliest evidence of maritime trade between India and China. The flat bronze basin with a diameter of 30.5 centimetres has, like today's specimens, a hump in the middle and a small hole in the hump. The word elathalam is composed of talam and the prefix ela, Tamil "leaf".

== See also ==
- Pandi Melam
- Panchari melam
- Thayambaka
- Panchavadyam
