= Kuzhal Pattu =

Form of traditional temple music

Kuzhal pattu is a form of traditional temple music practised in the Indian state of Kerala. It centers on the use of the kuzhal, a double reed wind instrument, and is typically performed at temple festivals.

== Structure ==
In kuzhal pattu, the kuzhal plays the lead with the support of several accompanying instruments, which may include chenda (both treble and bass), ilathalam, toppi maddalam and a sruti (drone) kuzhal. A Kuzhal Pattu typically starts with the lead kuzhal essaying an alapanam to establish a raga. The other instruments may join in as the kuzhal pattu progresses through several ragas and compositions. The span of the musical form ranges from five minutes to over an hour, with an average length of 30 minutes.

== Performance ==
Kuzhal pattu is typically used as a prelude to panchari melam, but may also be played prior to night seevelis (temple circumambulations) that perform panchavadyam. It is usually performed inside the temple before midnight. The kuzhal pattu is generally played in an elaborate way at temple festivals around Thrissur and Valluvanad areas, but it isn't very uncommon in other parts of Kerala as well. Valappay Nandhan, Oorakam Chandran, Kombathu Anil and Dhaneesh Thirunayathode were some of the famous persons who play Kuzhal Pattu very well

== Sources ==
- Killius, Rolf. (2006) Ritual Music and Hindu Rituals of Kerala. New Delhi: BR Rhythms. ISBN 81-88827-07-X.
