= Mattannoor Sankarankutty =

Indian musician

Mattanur Sankarankutty
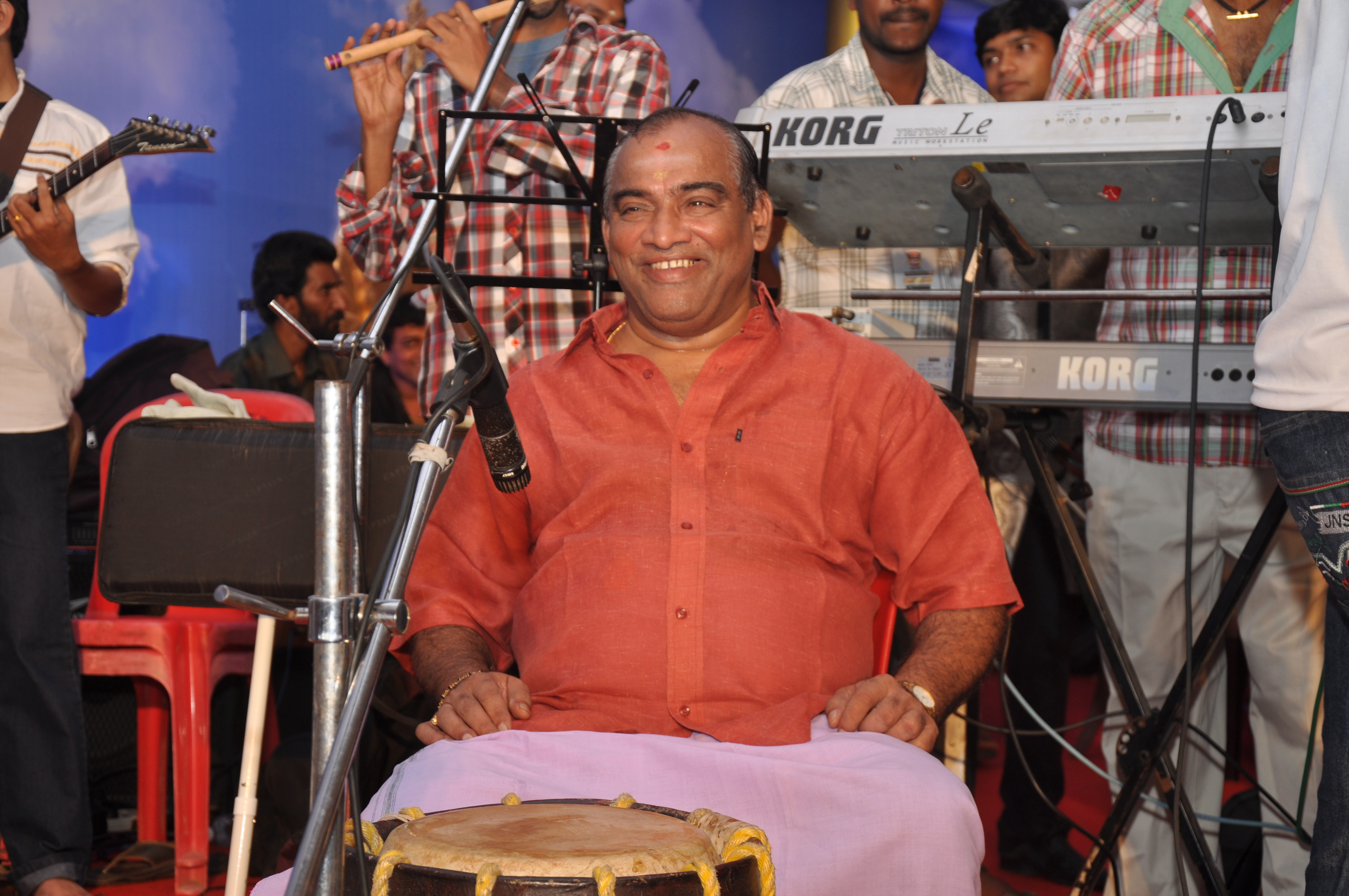
- Mattannoor Sankarankutty Marar, A Click from Thrissur Pooram 2010.
- Born: 25 August 1954 (age 71); Mattanur, Kannur, Kerala, India
- Occupations: Percussionist, Thayambaka exponent
- Years active: 1970–present
- Spouse: Bharathi
- Children: Mattannoor Sreekanth; Mattannoor Sreeraj; Mattannoor Saranya
- Parent(s): Mattannoor Kunhikrishna Marar; Karthyayani Marasyar
- Awards: Padma Shri–2007; Sangeet Natak Akademi Award–2012

Mattanur Sankarankutty Marar (M. P. Sankara Marar) is an Indian percussionist who plays the chenda (a traditional Kerala drum), Thayambaka, Panchari melam, and Panchavadyam. He was born in Mattanur in Kannur district of Kerala. He was awarded the Kerala Sangeetha Nataka Akademi Award in 1996, the Padma Shri by the Government of India in 2009 and the Sangeet Natak Akademi Award in 2012.

Mattanur, as he is known, is married to Bharathi, a native of Tirur in Malappuram district. They have two sons, Mattannur Sreekanth and Mattannur Sreeraj, and a daughter named Mattannur Saranya. Both Sreekanth and Sreeraj are also popular Thayambaka artists. Triple Thayambakas played by father and sons are very popular in Kerala.

== See also ==
- Pallavur Appu Marar
- Peruvanam Kuttan Marar
- Kelath Aravindakshan Marar
