= Parisha Vadyam =

Genre of percussion music

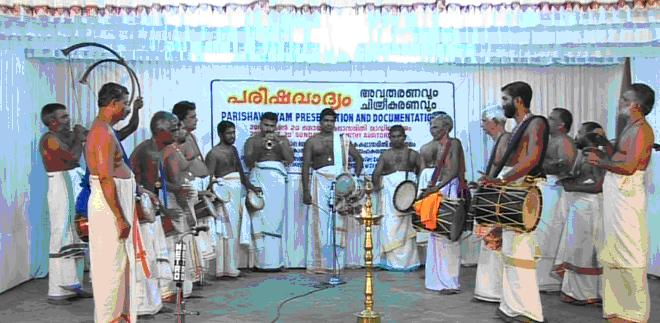

ParishaVadyam is a genre of percussion music that originated before centuries in Ramamangalam, when Panchavadyam was not there in the mainstream. Or in other words we can call Parisha Vaadyam "The Mother of Panchavadyam". Like Panchavadyam and all other Melams, Parishavaadyam also characterised by a pyramid like rhythmical structure.

Parishavaadyam was being performed in southern and central Kerala during the "Prathishta" (placing) and at the time of "Abhisheka" of "Bramhakalasa". Later this place occupied by Panchavadyam. Parishavaadyam comprises main instruments Thimila, "Achan Chenda" ("Veekkan Chenda") and "Ilathalam" accompanied by wind instrument "Kombu" and "Idakka".

In Parishavaadyam "Manodharma" (improvisation) is not applicable as the beats are pre-set.

There are two stages in Parishavaadyam. First stage bases on beats in ‘Ekataala’ known as "Ottakkol and Irikida". Its pendulum beats in the first stage where the Thimila players can perform between the time of first and second beat in Achan Chenda. It can be in 32 ‘aksharakaala’ (tempo) and when the tempo increases 16, 8 and 4 respectively. When it will reach 4 aksharakaala, it is known as "Irikida (Single beat of Achan Chenda followed by three beats in Thimila)".

The second stage is known as "Chendakkooru" which is based on "Triputa taala" and its ‘aksharakaalas’ are 28,14,7 and 3.5 respectively. Finally it ends in "Ekataala" like all other "Melams".

== See also ==
- Pandi Melam
- Panchari melam
- Thayambaka
- Kerala Kalamandalam
- Music of Kerala
