= Sadanam Vasudevan =

Indian percussionist

Sadanam Vasudevan (born 1945) is an Indian percussionist who plays the chenda (a traditional Kerala drum). He is a well-known artist in both Thayambaka and Kathakali performances. He received the Pallavur Appu Marar Award from the Kerala government in 2013. He also received the Kerala Sangeetha Nataka Akademi Fellowship in 2019.

Born in 1945 as the son of Karimpnaykkal Meenakshi Amma and Chenankara Gopalan Nair in Angadipuram in Malabar, Sadanam Vasudevan started learning Chenda at the age of seven. He later joined the Gandhi Seva Sadan (Sadanam), a leading Kathakali institution in Perur village near Ottappalam in Palghat, and continued his studies as a disciple of Pallassana Chandramannadiar. He later became a chenda teacher at Sadanam. He is the guru of many famous artists like Mattannoor Sankarankutty. He is also proficient in playing Madhalam, Idakka, and Timila.
