= Kombu (disambiguation) =

Kombu is an edible kelp.

Kombu may also refer to:

- Kombu (instrument), a wind instrument (kind of trumpet) from South India.
- Kombu green, a variation of chartreuse
- Sassafras albidum, a tree that produces sassafras oil, called "kombu" in Choctaw

== See also ==
- Kelp, seaweed
- Kombucha, a fermented tea
