= Kuzhal =

South Indian musical instrument

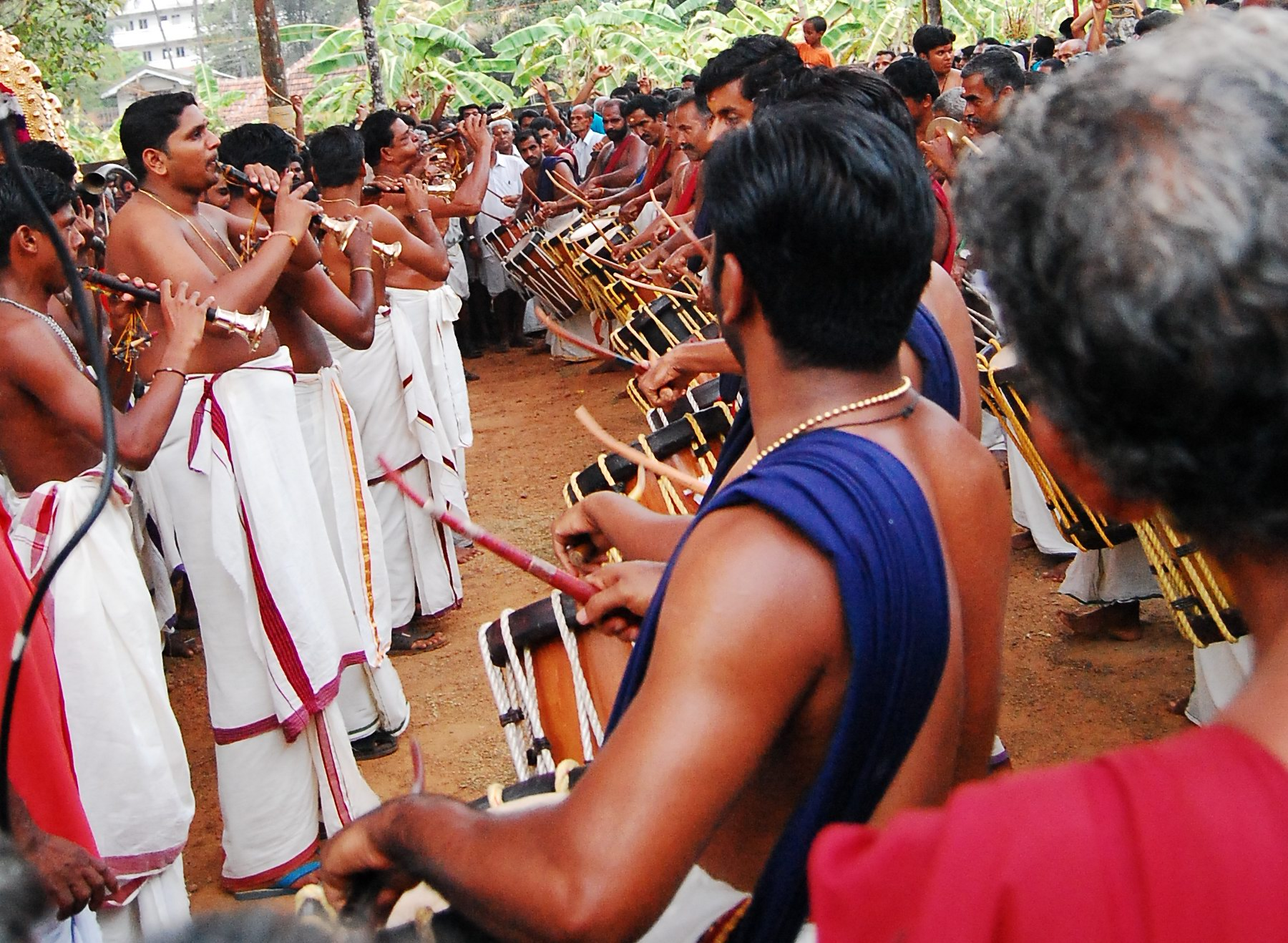
Kuzhal aerophones and chenda drums

The kuzhal is a traditional double reed wind instrument used in the south Indian state of Kerala. It is similar in construction to a nagaswaram or a large shehnai, and has a very shrill and penetrating tone.

Kuzhal is primarily used as an accompaniment for chenda-led ensembles Panchari Melam and Pandi Melam, where the piper plays the anchor role. However, as prelude to melams, it is also used to present solo concert (with a couple of accompanying instruments), in which case it is called Kuzhal Pattu.

The instrument has a wooden body with a conical bore, at the end of which is affixed a brass bell. The player, who is almost always male, blows through a double reed and closes small holes with both hands.

== See also ==
- Nadaswaram
- Shehnai
- Music of Kerala
