= Eruthukali =

Indian folk dance

Erutukali
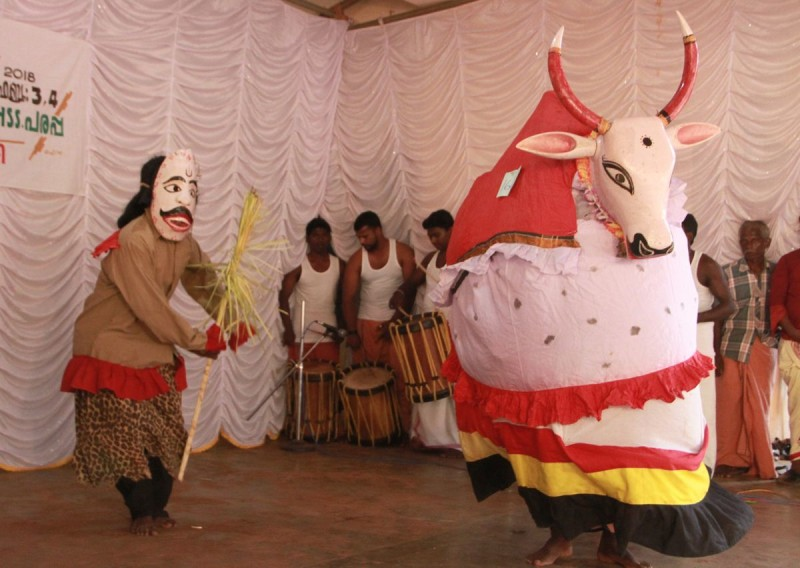
- Eruthukali staged in a cultural event
- Native name: എരുതുകളി (Malayalam)
- Genre: Ritual
- Instrument(s): Chenda, Chempila
- Origin: North Malabar, India

Erutukali also spelled as Eruthu Kali is a folk art popular in North Malabar region of Kerala, India. It is a folk art form performed by the Mavilar community.

== Overview ==
Erutukali is a folk art popular in North Malabar region of Kerala, India. It is an art form practiced by the Mavilan community living in the hilly areas of Kasaragod and Kannur districts. It is a folk art form performed by Mavilar people in their village area on the tenth day of Malayalam month Thulam.

Erutukali dance is performed as a prayer that everyone will have agricultural prosperity in the future.

== Etymology ==
The word 'erutu' means big bull. 'Kali' means play or dance. The main character in Erutukali is the Edupukala (dummy bull), a big bull which is made of bamboo sticks, straw, cloth and a wooden head.

== Myth ==
While the ancestors of the Mavilar people were working in Ponam (Rice farming done in the hills by clearing the forest) fields of the janmis, two men were sent to Subrahmanya to buy bullocks. On the way back with the bullocks, after feeling tired, the two rested on the way and fell asleep. When they got up, the bulls were nowhere to be found. After searching everywhere to no avail, they made a vow that they would perform Eruthukali every year. After returning the bulls, they did as they were told.

== Performance ==
Before wearing the Eruthu costume, the performer offers poha and puffed rice made with fresh paddy and fruits to the ancestors and praying them.

Carrying a big bull which is made of bamboo sticks, straw, cloth and a wooden head, the mavilars will go house to house, swinging it rhythmically. Traditional instruments like Chenda and Chempila are used as instruments. There is song and dance according to the instrument music. It uses songs about the beginning of agriculture. Starts on the tenth day of Malayalam month Thulam, this folk art form ends with the tiger catching the bull on the third day.

The bull is taken to all the houses associated with agricultural works. The players will also be given gifts by the family.
