= Peruvanam Kuttan Marar =

Indian percussionist

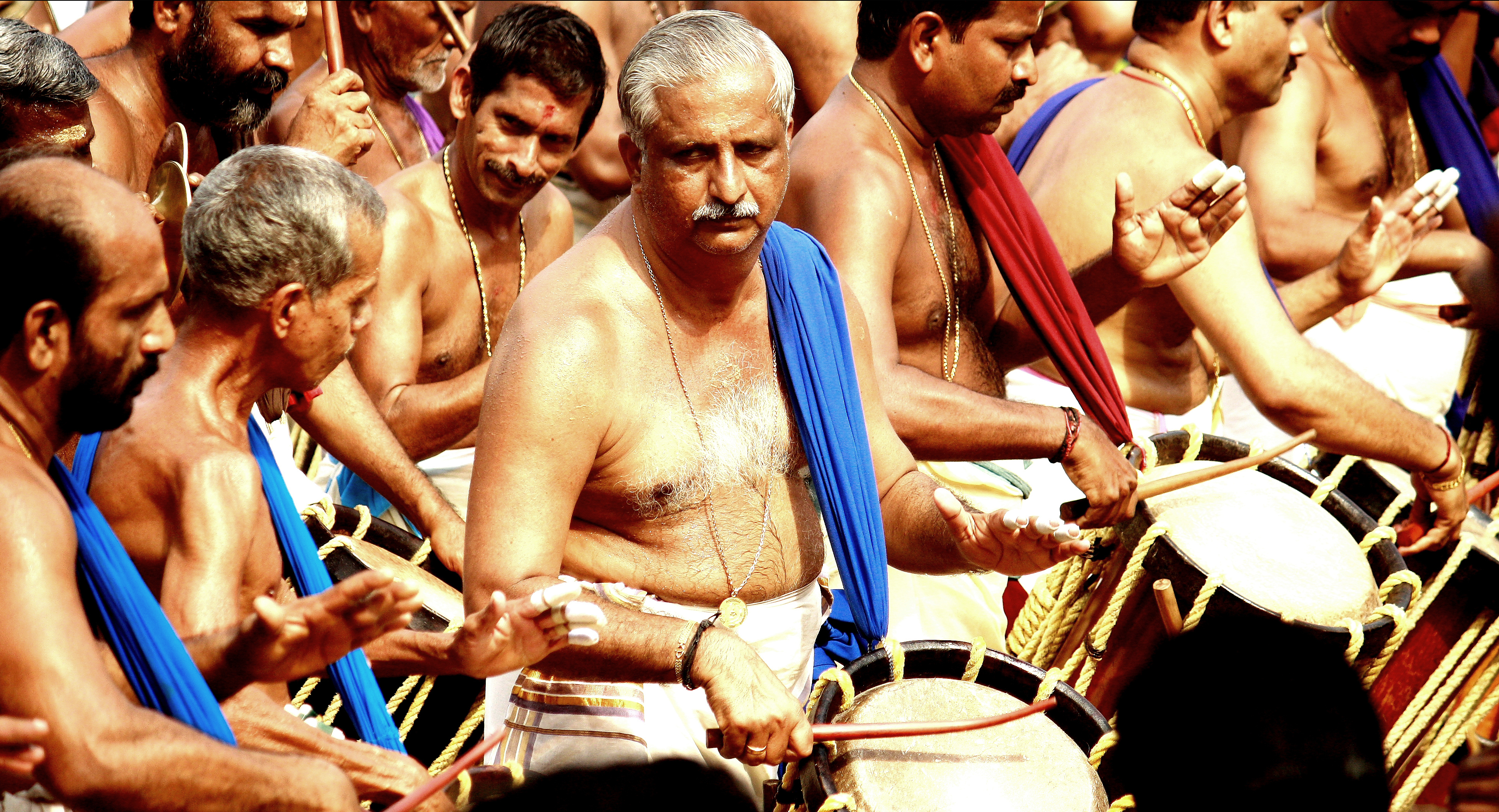
- Peruvanam Kuttan Marar performing Melam at Sree Poornathrayesa Temple, Thrippunithura

Background information
- Born: M Sankara Narayanan; 25 November 1953 (age 72); Peruvanam, Thrissur, Kerala, India
- Occupation: Percussion Artist
- Instrument: Chenda
- Years active: 1963–present

Peruvanam Kuttan Marar is a chenda artist. He leads several popular traditional orchestra performances in Kerala. He received Padma Shri, India's third highest civilian award, in 2011 for his contributions in the field of art.

== Early life ==
Peruvanam Kuttan Marar was born to a family of chenda artists in Peruvanam, Thrissur, Kerala. His grandfather, Peruvanam Narayana Marar and his father, Peruvanam Appu Marar were also well-known chenda artists. His teachers include his father, Kumarapuram Appu Marar and Sreenarayanapuram Appu Marar. He made his debut with Chenda at the age of 10. He performed at festivals in nearby temples including Peruvanam Mahadeva Temple. He also joined as a clerk in C N N Boys' High School, Cherpu at the age of 20.

== Career as an artist ==
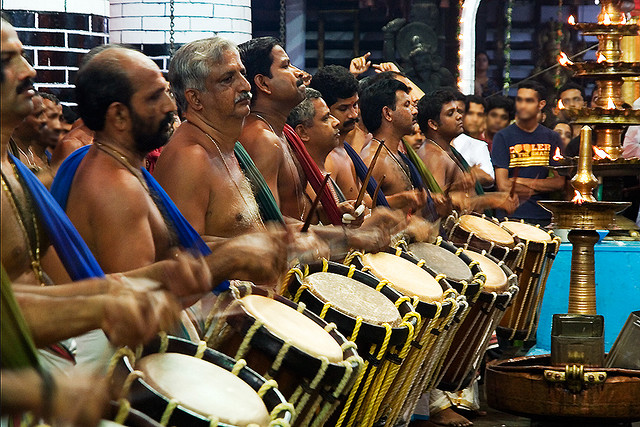
Sree Peruvanam Kuttan Marar and group performing Melam at Sree Poornathrayeesa Temple, Thripunithura.

Kuttan Marar features in prominent temple festivals of Kerala including Thrissur Pooram, Peruvanam pooram, Kollam Pooram and those at Guruvayur Temple. He leads the famous Ilanjithara Melam of Thrissur Pooram. Kuttan Marar started performing at the Ilanjithara Melam from 1977 and has been its Pramani since 1999.

(Partial) listing of temples where Peruvanam Kuttan Marar has performed :

1. Puthucode Bhaghavathy temple
2. Puthur Thirupuraikal Bhagavathy Temple
3. Panangad Sri Maha Ganapathi Temple
4. Thripunithura Poornathrayeesa temple
5. Vaikom Mahadeva temple
6. Guruvayur temple
7. Pallathamkullangara Bhagavathy temple, Ernakulam
8. Ilankunnapuzha temple, Ernakulam
9. Kuttanelloor temple, Thrissur
10. Manalaarukaavu temple, Thrissur
11. Puzhakkarakkavu temple, Moovattupuzha
12. Paramekkavu temple
13. Vadakkumnathan temple
14. Cherpu Bagavathi temple, Cherpu
15. Thamarakulangara temple, Tripunithura
16. Kottaram Bhagavathy temple. Maradu
17. Ernakulam_Shiva_Temple
18. Peruvanam temple
19. Aarattupuzha temple
20. Chinakathoor temple
21. Malliyoor Sree Maha Ganapathy Temple
22. Irinjalakuda temple
23. Kodunthirapully Durgasthami & Mahanavami Navaratri Fest, Palakkad
24. Cherpulasshery Bhagavathy temple
25. Paliam Siva Temple
26. Sree Mahadheva Temple, Rajakkad
27. Pilakkad Sree Ramankulangara Ayyappa Temple
28. Thiruvarppu Sree Krishna Swamy temple, Kottayam
29. Mannuthrukkovil Mahavishnu temple, Pullazhy, Thrissur

(Partial) listing of artists who perform with Peruvanam Kuttan Marar on a regular basis :

1. Tiruvalla Radhakrishnan
2. Peruvanam Satheeshan Marar
3. Kelath Aravindakshan Marar
4. Pazhuvil Raghu Marar
5. Chowalloor Mohanan Nair
6. Chowalloor Mohanan Warrier
7. Peruvanam Karthik Marar
1. Anthikkad Ramachandran
2. Anthikkad Padmanbhan
3. Peruvanam Sankaranarayanan
4. Peruvanam Shivan
5. Peruvanam Prakashan
6. Peruvanam Krishnan
7. Maniyamparambil Mani Nair
8. Kizhoot Nandanan

== In popular culture ==
C. Venugopal and K. Ramachandran produced a 45-minute documentary on Kuttan Marar, named Pranathi.

== Awards ==
1. Keli Melasooryan Award 2012
2. Sangeetha Nataka Academy Fellowship 2012
3. Pallavoor Puraskaram 2012
4. Padma Shri award in 2011
5. Kerala Sangeetha Nataka Akademi Fellowship in 2010
6. Kerala Sangeetha Nataka Akademi Award 2001
7. Veerashringhala 2000
8. Arattupuzha Sri Sastha Award
9. Sri Guruvayurappan Award
10. Keli's promising Artist Award 1999
11. Keli's Golden Conch 2005
12. Keli's Lifetime achievement Award 2009
13. Kala Darpana Award
14. Nada Purnathrayee Award
15. Adaraneeyam Award
16. Mela Kala Chakravarti
17. Vadyotama Award
18. Melakalanidhi

== See also ==
- Peruvanam
