= Vadyakala =

Vadhyakala are the basics of temple performing arts of Kerala. It uses various instruments including chenda, madhalam, idakka, thimala, thalam, eena, Udukku, Villu, and Pulluvakkudam.

== Chenda ==
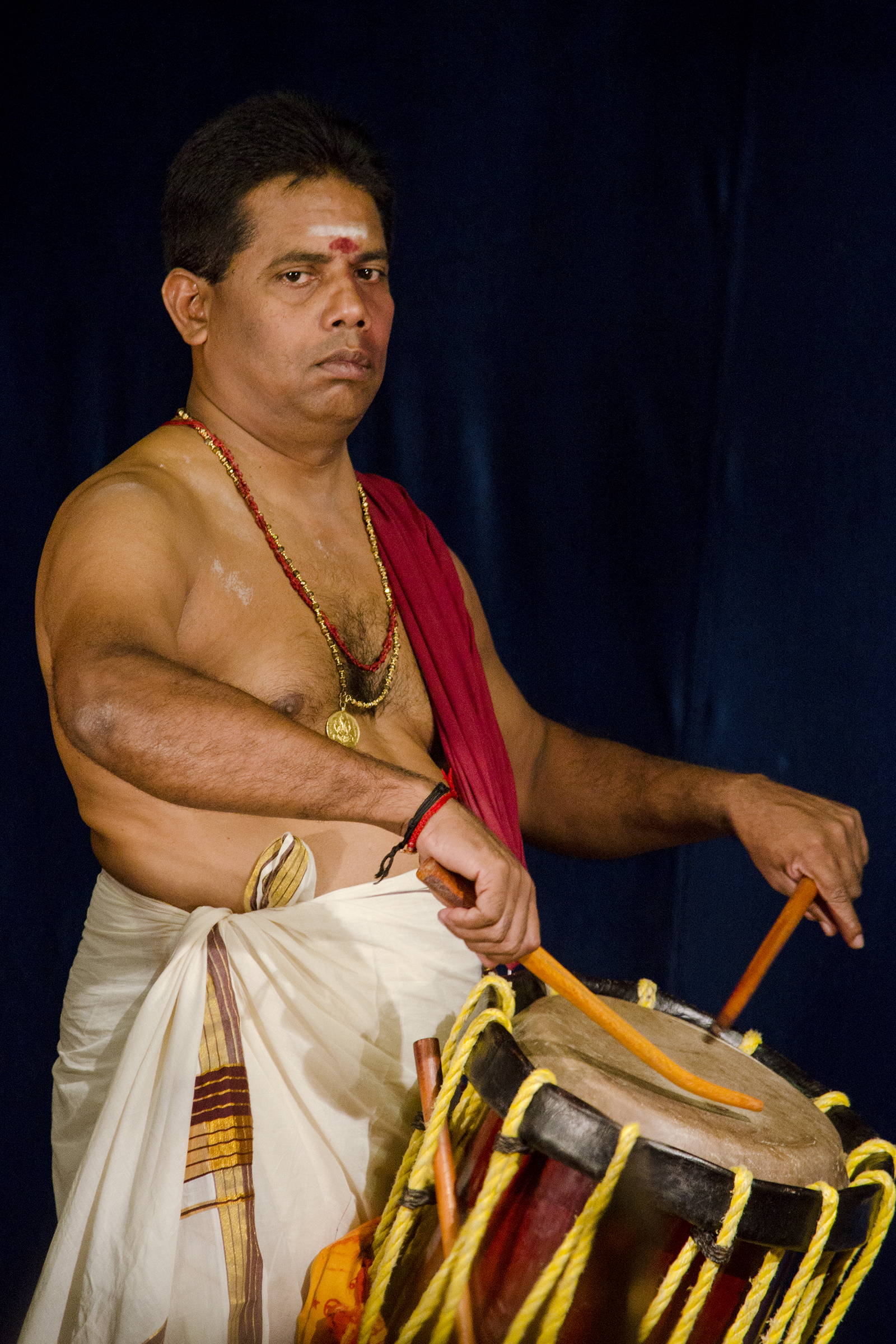
Chenda playing

The Chenda is a cylindrical percussion instrument used widely in the state of Kerala, India. It is also used in some parts of Karnataka where it is called the Chande. The chenda is mainly played as an accompaniment in the Hindureligious art forms of Kerala. The chenda is used as an accompaniment for Kathakali, Koodiyattam, Kannyar Kali and among many forms of dances and rituals in Kerala. It is also played in a dance-drama called Yakshagana which is popular in Karnataka.
