= Kakkayur =

- Village
- Location in Kerala, India
- Coordinates: 10°39′0″N 76°38′0″E
- Country: India
- State: Kerala
- District: Palakkad

Population
  - Total: 8,483

Languages
  - Official: Malayalam, English
- Time zone: UTC+5:30 (IST)
- PIN: 678512
- Telephone code: 04923
- Vehicle registration: KL-70
- Nearest city: Palakkad
- Lok Sabha constituency: Alathur
- Website: unimo740

Kakkayur is a small village between Koduvayur, Pallavur and Kunisseri in Palakkad district of Kerala state, south India. Kakkayur is on the Palakkad Nemmara route about 13 km from Palakkad town. It is part of Koduvayur Grama Panchayat. The population is around 8500 and the literacy of the village stands at 86.3%.

== School ==
The most prominent institution in the village is the Devaki Memorial Senior Basic School. The school was established more than a century ago, in 1895 and is a renowned hub for literary and cultural activities. It is a Government Aided school, and is often cited as one of the best UP schools in the Nemmara sub-district. Several of its alumni, hold high positions in the Government and Private Sectors within India and abroad today. K.G.Anilkumar is the HeadMaster of the school, as of writing this article. (2016)

== Places of Worship ==
- The Kakkayur Siva Temple is an important place of worship. The presiding deity, also called Kakkayurappan, is considered by believers to be the protector of the village. The temple is governed by the Malabar Devaswom Board.
- The Lord Ayyappa temple, situated atop a hillock called Kottamala, is also famous. The hill which has 300 odd steps leading all the way to the top, is also a popular visiting spot.
- The Thiruvilayanadu temple is a small but well-maintained shrine, dedicated to Bhagavathy. Its 'pratishtadinam' is one of the major celebrations in the village.
- The Buddha Temple is a shrine built beneath a Bodhi tree (Pipal tree). Legend has it that the tree was grown from a seed from the same Bodhi tree under which the Buddha meditated.
- There is a well-attended mosque at Cherikkode. The major celebration is during Ramzan and Id.

=== Banks ===
The Punjab National Bank is the only public-sector bank in the village, and is actively used by the villagers. There is also a Cooperative Bank functioning under the umbrella of the Kerala State Cooperative Bank, though used to a lesser extent.

=== Auditorium ===
The Oottupura of the Kakkayur Siva Temple is the only auditorium in the village. It has a capacity of 150-200 people.

=== District Training Center, Scouts and Guides ===
The district training center for Scouts and Guides is located at Annakode, Kakkayur.

== Cultural Activities ==
Kanyarkali (കണ്യാര്കളി) is a folk dance ritual usually performed during the months of April and May. The Kakkayur style of performance is unique and enjoys a huge fan following. The Keli Kanyarkali Sangham of Kakkayur has performed on several stages across Kerala and abroad.

== Transportation ==
Kakkayur town connects to other parts of India through Palakkad city. National Highway No.544 connects to Coimbatore and Bangalore. Other parts of Kerala is accessed through National Highway No.66 going through Thrissur. The nearest major railway station is Shornur. The nearest airport is Coimbatore.

== Geography ==
Kakkayur is mostly an agricultural village. It is a peaceful place nestled in greenery. There are several ponds that dot the landscape, and is used mostly for irrigation purposes.

=== Kakkayur Temple Pond ===
The Kakkayur Temple pond is a major waterbody that serves for the bathing and washing needs of a majority of people in this village. The huge tank is also a training place for the local swimming team, some of whom are national level champions. The pond was renovated at a cost of 20 Lakh Rupees by the Residents in 2016 - The project was executed by an action committee presided by Sri. Sundareswaran Marar.

== Notable Persons ==
1. Kalamandalam Sivan Namboothiri - Koodiyattam Artist - Padmashri awardee
