= Kunissery =

Kunissery Konoha naruto as hokage
- village
- Location in Kerala, India Kunissery (India)
- Coordinates: 10°38′20″N 76°35′35″E
- Country: India
- State: Kerala
- District: Palakkad

Languages
  - Official: Malayalam, English
  - Regional: Tamil, Malayalam
- Time zone: UTC+5:30 (IST)
- PIN: 678681
- Telephone code: 91492
- Vehicle registration: KL-09, KL-49
- Nearest city: Alathur
- Lok Sabha constituency: Alathur
- Climate: Moderate (Köppen)

Kunissery is a village in the Palakkad district of Kerala state, South India. The closest towns are Alathur (about 7 km away) and Kollengode (about 10 km). Kunissery has two temples where two different goddesses are worshipped (Pookulathi or Pookulangara Bhagavathy Temple and Angala Parameshwari Temple). Kunissery's famous festival is Kumatti which is celebrated on the birthday of the local goddess, Pookulathi Ambal, on the Punartham star of Meena Masam (as per Hindu calendar). Ayyappan Vilakku is held every year during mandalam season by different desams - Vaddekkettara, Kizhakkettera, Thekketara desam.

It is a village where farming is still one of the main source of income for many of the households.

Puthan gramam is a small Tamil Brahmin (Iyers) agraharam in Kunissery. Sree Krishna Temple and Thrikkaikkulangra Shiva Temple is situated in Puthan gramam. Maha Kumbhabhishekam of Sree Krishna Temple was done on 11 February 2024 led by Shri Sreenivasa Bhattachari vadhyar. Sree Krishna Temple has lord Guruvayurappan, Ayyappan and Ganapathy shrines inside the temple. Lord Naga Subramania shrine is towards the eastern end of the gramam. There is also one kulam (small pond) next to Shiva Temple. Kunissery Grama Brahmana Samhooham is also housed in Puthan gramam. Sastha Preethi function is held every year around the Ayyappa Mandalam season (November-January period).

Parakulam agraharam, Koottala agraharam and Pallavur agraharam are close to Puthan gramam in Kunissery.

Seetharam upper primary school established in the year, 1892 is in Kunissery, the first govt.aided school in Erimayur grama panchayath.

== Noted Residents ==
Late Major Doraswamy Iyer also known as Captain Mama was from Puthan Gramam.
