= Kanyarkali =

Indian folk dance ritual

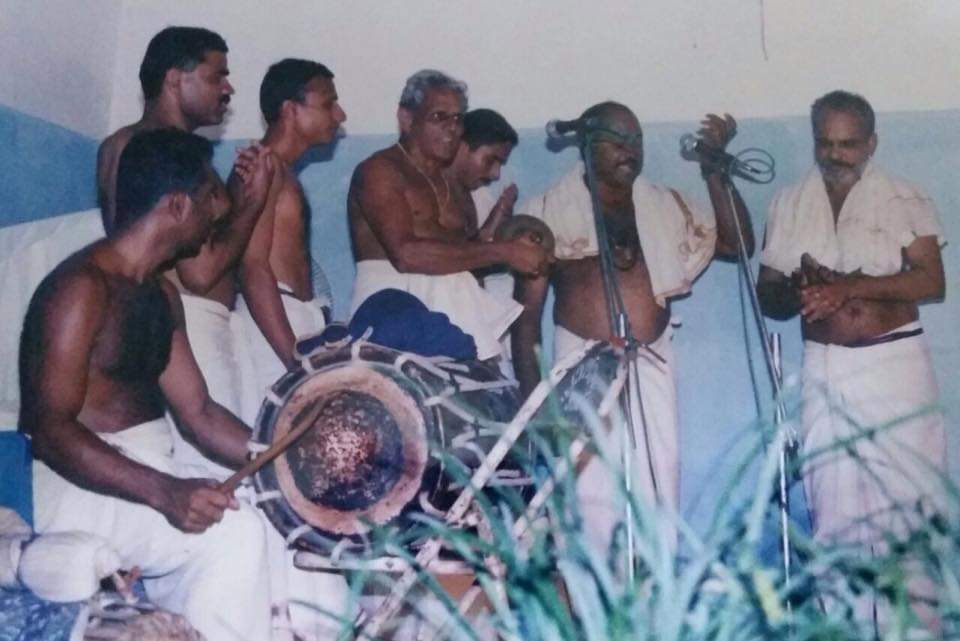
A kanyarkali Performance

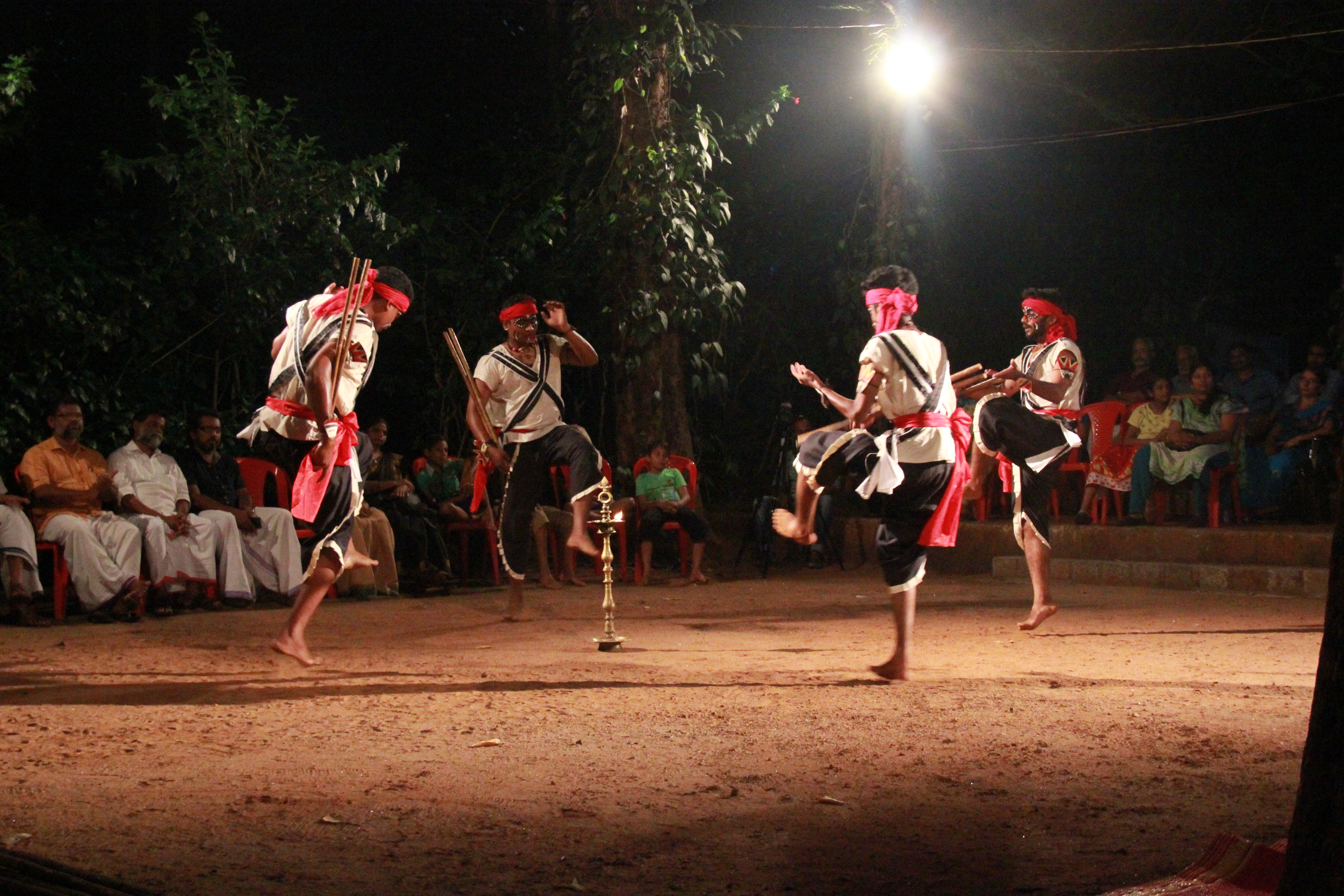
Vettuvakanakkar Porattu

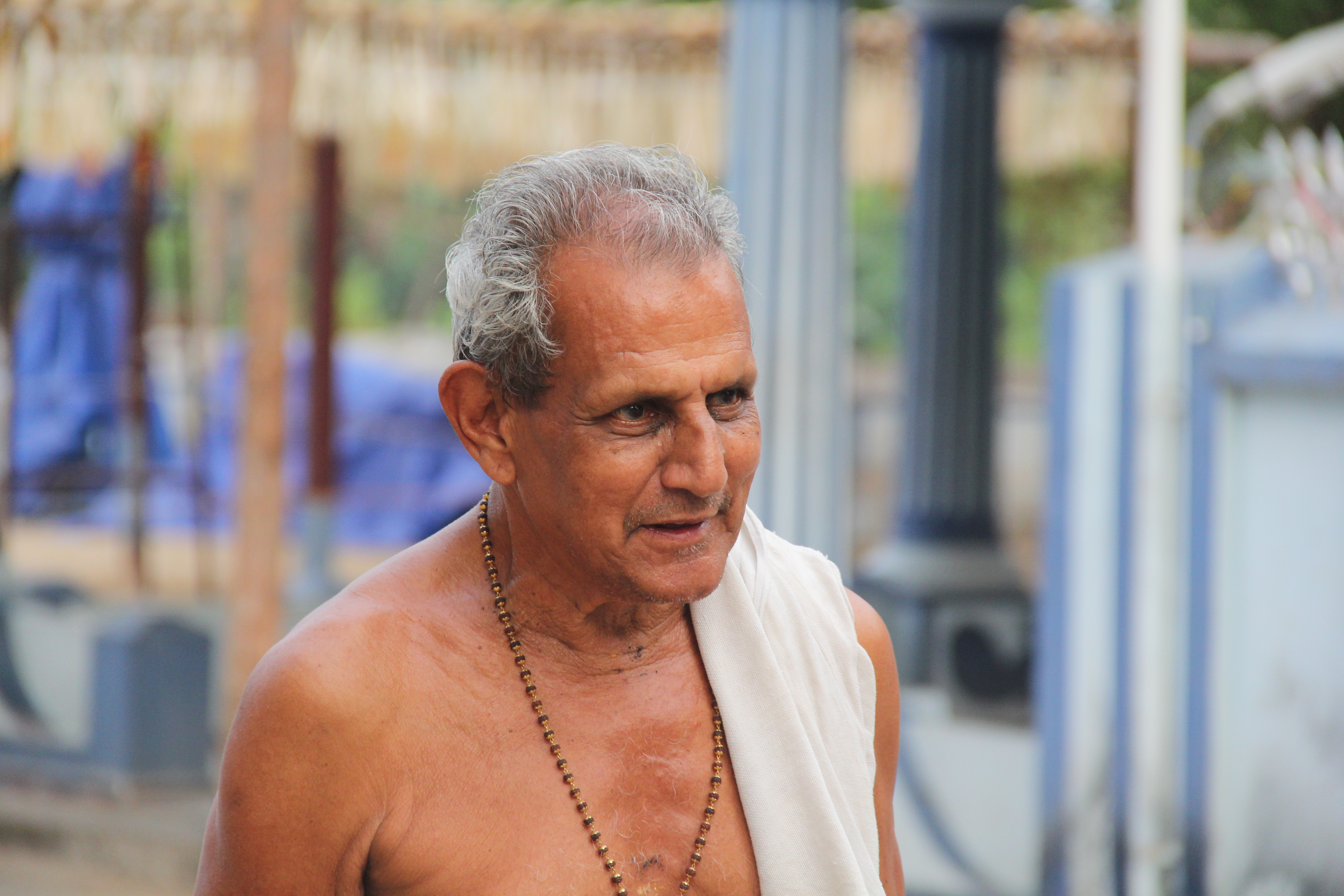
Ashan Late Pallassana K. Dwarakakrishnan Nair

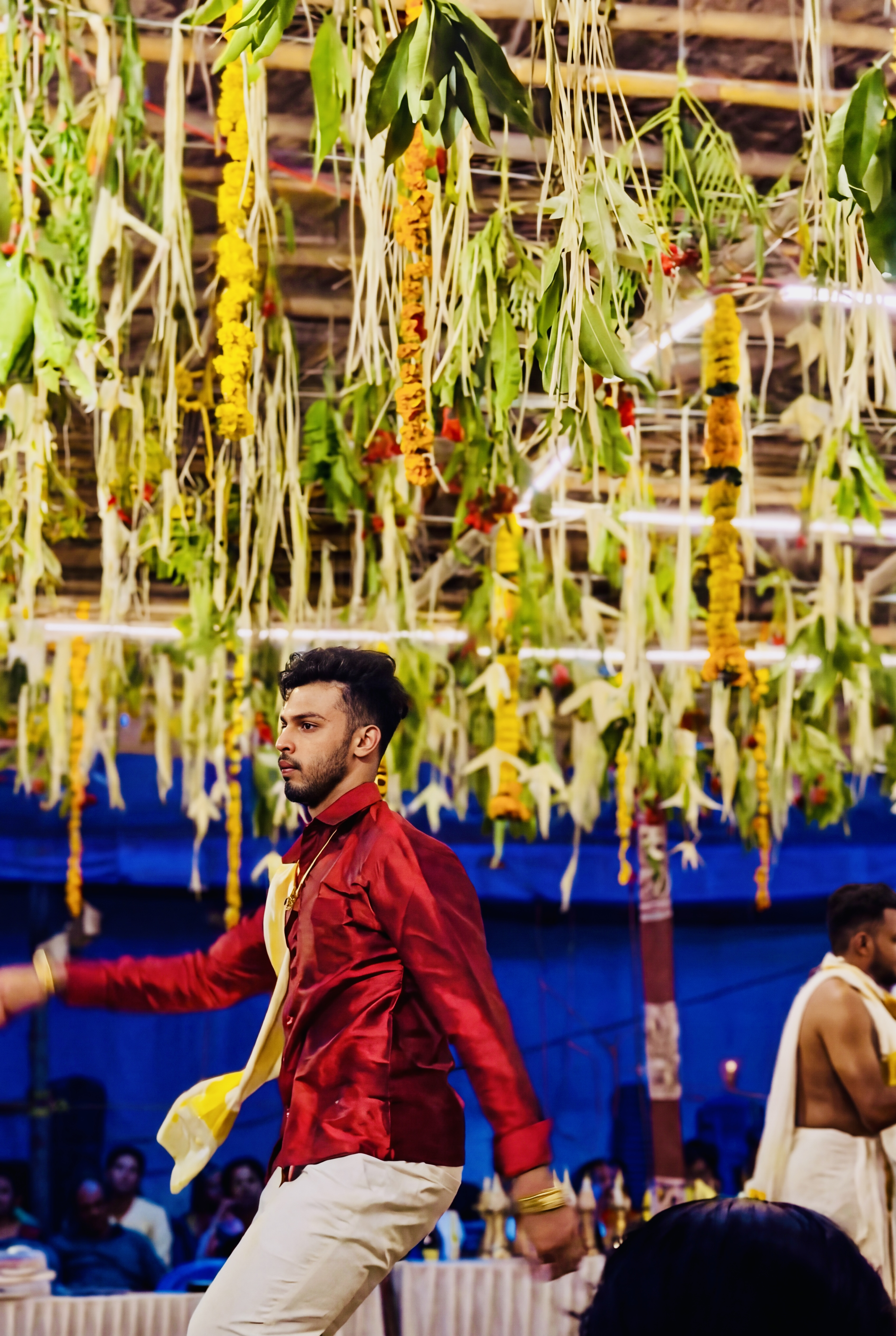
The Mannan Purattu

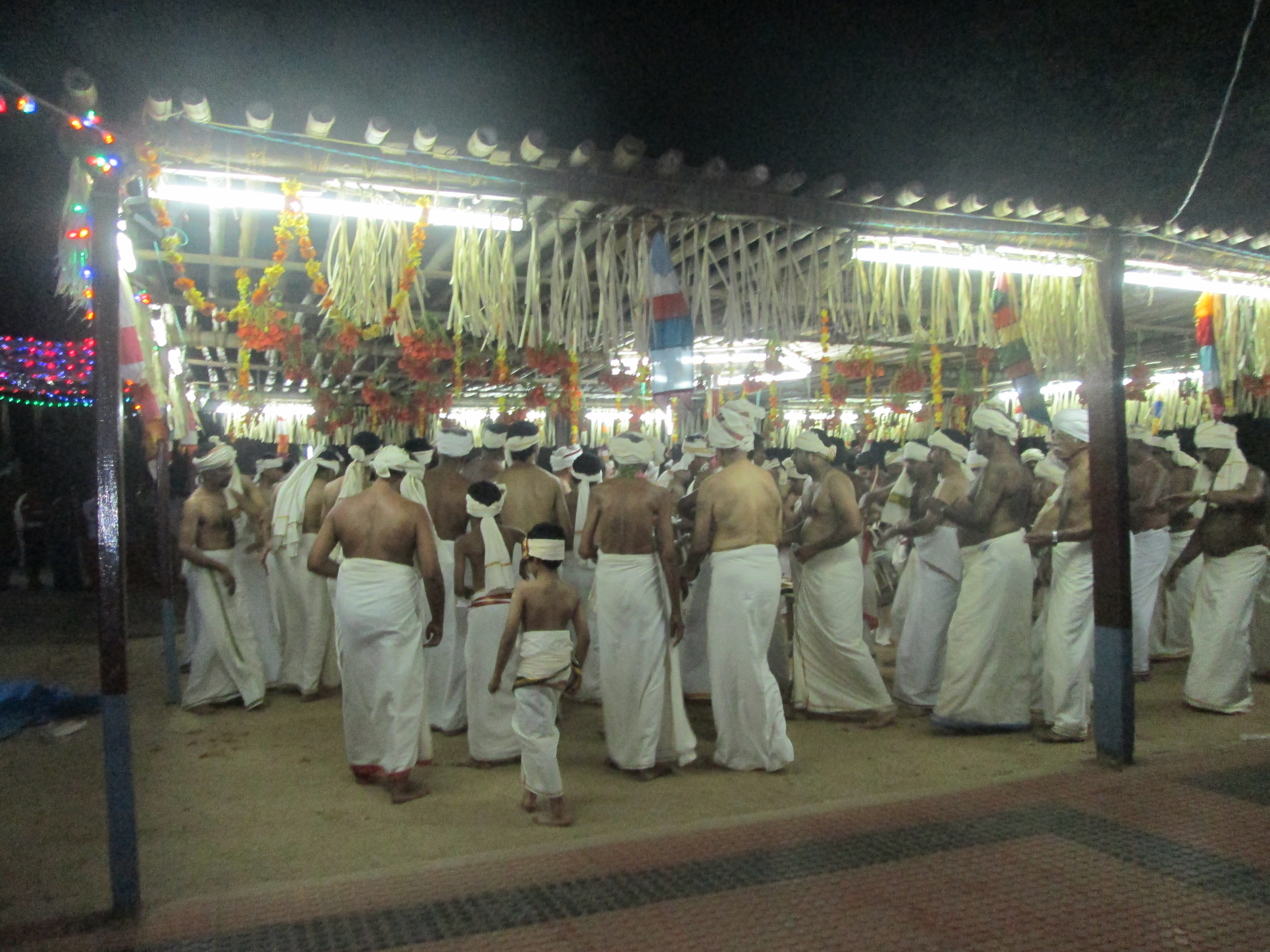
Vattakali being performed

Kanniyar Kali is a folk dance ritual performed in the temples of villages in the taluks of Alathur and Chittur, Palakkad district, Kerala, India. The event is usually a part of Vishu celebrations, occurring after the Vela (village fair) in the months of April and May. It is an agricultural festival dance of the Nair castes. Kanniyar Kali, despite the name of the Virgin, does not have anything to do with the Kannaki cult.

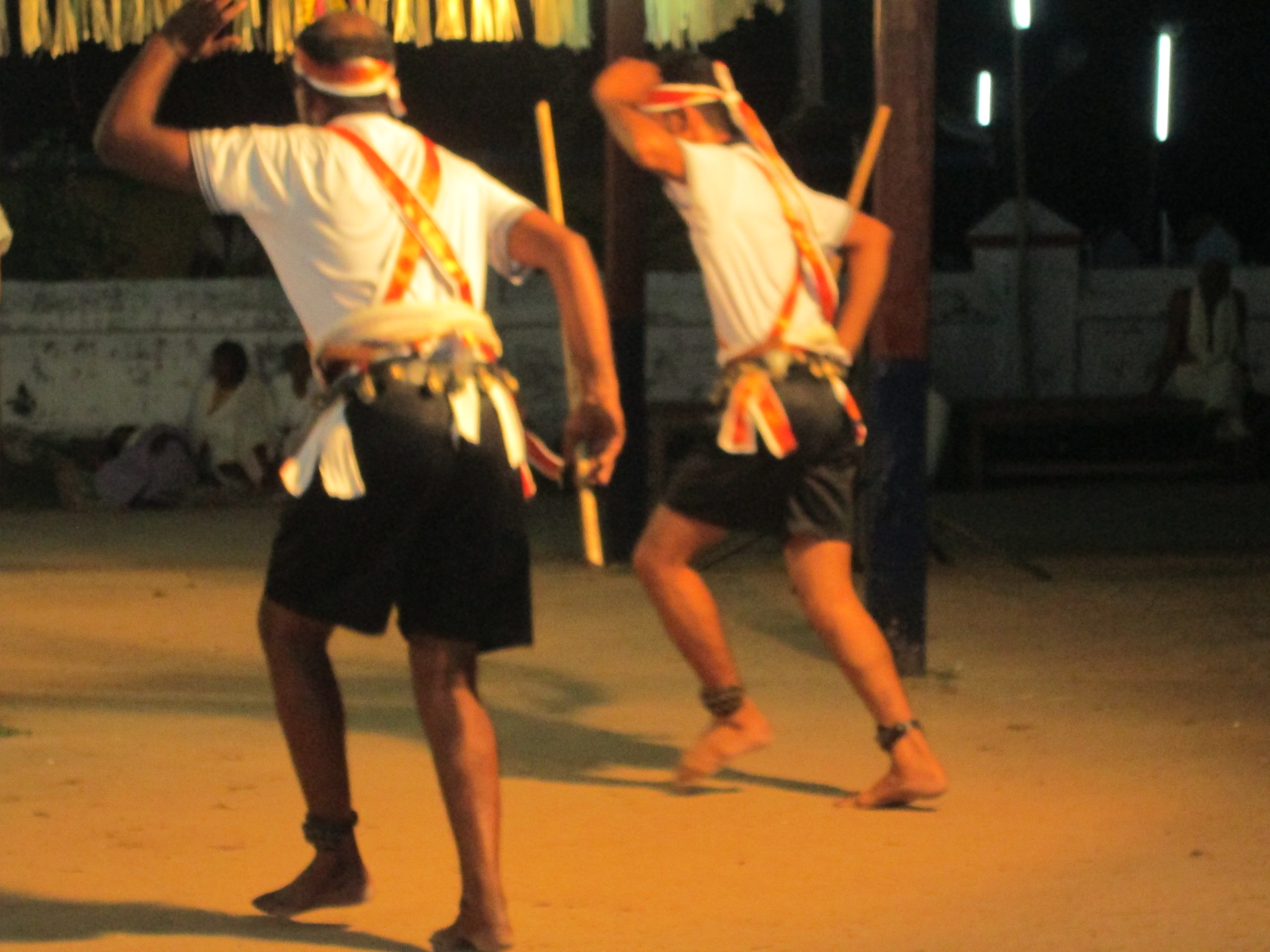
The Erattakudan purattu of kanyarkali

Kanniyar Kali is in no way connected with the Kaniyar community, a community of authentic astrologers of Kerala.

== Performance ==
The dance is performed at night and ends at dawn, and is conducted for four consecutive nights. In certain villages it is conducted only for three consecutive nights.

The dance starts with the men of the community gathering in the temples and performing a rhythmic circular dance called vattakali (literally meaning "a circular dance"). The vattakali is followed by several puraattu, which literally means farce. The purattu does not have a standard format, but each lasts for about an hour. The purattu depict the life and social customs of various castes and tribes of medieval Kerala and Tamil Nadu. Since the purattu depict various heterogeneous castes and tribes, the various purattus have different costumes, style of dancing and songs with different tempos. Certain purattu which depict fierce tribes or warrior tribes have performances resembling stick fights and martial movements whereas certain other purattus have slow and rhythmic movements. Certain purattus are laced with humor and depict a scenario wherein a long lost husband and wife have a reunion.

It is performed in a specially made square stage called a pandal. The pandal is located in front of the temple or its premises. It consists of a lighted lamp in the centre and consists of a roof supported by nine pillars. The singers occupy the central position of the stage and the dancers dance along the periphery of the pandal in a circular manner.

The songs are mostly in Malayalam and certain purattus have songs in which there is a heavy influence of Tamil.

The accompanying instruments are the elatalam, chenda and the chengalam. Maddalam is an accompaniment in vattakali.

The participants are solely men; women are represented by cross-dressing men who imitate the body language and way of speaking of women.

In the last decade, women have made their debut Kanyarkali performance in a Desappanthal at Kakkayur.
