= Panchari melam =

Percussion ensemble

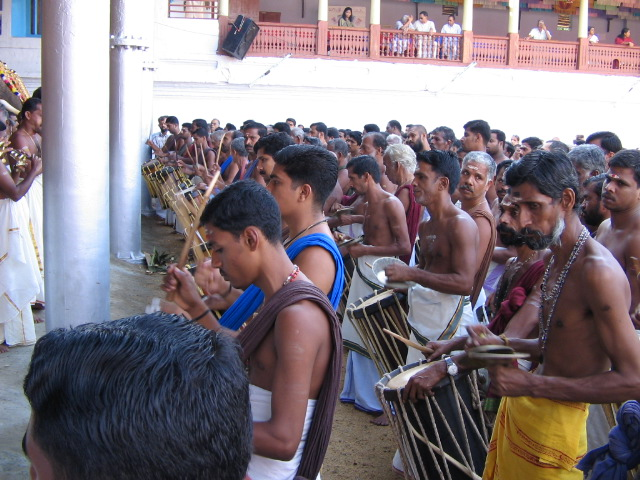
Melam at Tripunithura Poornathrayeesa Temple

Panchari Melam is a percussion ensemble, performed during temple festivals in Kerala, India. Panchari Melam (or simply panchari), is one of the major forms of Chenda Melam (ethnic drum ensemble), and is the best-known and most popular in the kshetram vadyam (temple percussion) genre. Panchari Melam, comprising instruments like Chenda, Ilathalam, Kombu and Kuzhal, is performed during many temple festivals in central Kerala, where it is presented in arguably the most classical manner. Panchari is also traditionally performed, albeit with a touch of subtle regional difference, in north Kerala (Malabar) and south-central Kerala (Kochi). Of late, its charm has led to its performance even in temples in Kerala's deep south.

Panchari is a six-beat thaalam (taal) with equivalents like Roopakam in south Indian Carnatic music and Daadra in the northern Hindustani classical.

Another Chenda Melam which comes close to Panchari in prominence and grammatical soundness, is Pandi Melam, performed outside temple precincts in general. Other Chenda Melams, though less popular, are Chempata, Adanta, Anchatanta, Dhruvam, Chempha, Navam, Kalpam and Ekadasam. Though there are expressional differences between the Panchari and the above-mentioned Melams (other than Pandi), the description of the former is prototypical for the rest of them.

Panchari Melam is performed either in its elaborate form (during annual temple festivals) or in its sketchy detail (to accompany the daily or weekly temple rituals).

The ensemble starts at the main entrance to the inner part of the temple, slowly circling the shrine clockwise while playing. A panchari melam has five stages, each of them based on beats totalling 96, 48, 24, 12 and 6 respectively. The first phase of the Panchari Melam, also called the "Pathikaalam" stands out for its unique blend of percussion and notes from the Kuzhal. The crescendo rises higher with each phase, eventually culminating in the fifth phase with a 6-beat cycle. For the culmination of the fifth phase, a unique 3-beat cycle called "Muri-Panchari" is also employed to take the Melam to an apt conclusion. The Melam thus starts with a broad base, and progresses completing the pyramid structure, culminating at the apex.

The semi-circular procession, with caparisoned elephants (totalling anywhere from three up to fifteen), is led by the deity of the temple carried by the male elephant in the centre. (Ritualistically the idol is carried by the Namboodiri priest himself). The deity is kept facing the musical ensemble and devotees/Melam buffs, with the latter surrounding the musicians and following the progress of the melam.

== Major venues ==
Panchari melam, in its grand classical form, is staged during temple festivals in and around Thrissur and Ernakulam districts . Tripunithura Sree Poornathrayesa Temple Vrischikolsavam is considered as one of the best venues of Panchari Melam where one can encounter Panchari Melams at its sublime best. Irinjalakkuda Koodalmanikyam Temple's annual festival is also another renowned venue for Panchari Melam. Peruvanam Pooram, Arattupuzha Pooram, Kuttanellur Pooram, Edakkunni Uthram Vilakku, Kuzhur Sree Subramanya Swami Temple Ekadashi festival, Eranakulathappan Temple, Ettumanoor Mahadevar Temple are some of the other known venues of Panchari Melam

== Chiefs (Pramanis) ==
The percussionist (Edamthala) who leads the Panchari melam is known as Melapramani, he will be the one who decides the duration and style of a Panchari melam. There are a lot of Melapramani in Panchari Melam stretching from the north to the south of Kerala, especially in Palakkad, Thrissur and Ernakulam. The most famous and seniors who conduct the Panchari Melam are Padma Shri Peruvanam Kuttan Maarar (who used to be the pramani of famous Ilanjithara Melam of Thrissur Pooram from 1999 to 2022), Kizhakkoottu Aniyan Maarar (the current pramani of Ilanjithara Melam), Cheranalloor Shankarankutty Maarar, and Mattannoor Sankarankutty.

Others are

- RLV Mahesh Kumar
- Peruvanam Appu Maarar
- Thrippekkulam Achutha Maarar
- Pallavoor Appu Maarar
- Kalloor Ramankutty Maarar
- Pazhuvil Raghu Maarar
- Kelath Aravindakshan Maarar
- Peruvanam Satheeshan Maarar
- Cherussery Kuttan Maarar
- Thiruvalla Radhakrishnan
- Chowalloor Mohanan Nair
- Chowalloor Mohana Warrier
- Chowalloor Sunil
- Kalloor Unnikrishnan Maarar
- Jayaram
- Chennamangalam Unnikrishna Marar

== Other Pramanis ==
There are Pramanis for the other 4 instruments in a Panchari Melam as well who will be the leader of the section

=== Valamthala ===
1. Pallipuram Jayan
2. Kuzhoor Balan

=== Ilathaalam (cymbals) ===
1. Paanjal Velukutty
2. Peruvanam Murali
3. Thonnurkara Sivan

=== Kuzhal (conical oboe) ===
1. Velappaya Nandanan
2. Oorakam Anil

=== Kombu (horn instrument) ===
1. Odakkali Murali
2. PAZHAMBALACODE NATARAJAN

== See also ==
- Pandi Melam
- Panchavadyam
- Thayambaka
