= Melam =

The term "melam" means "ensemble," as in a "musical ensemble." In Kerala, "melam" refers to a group of Maddalam (drums) and similar percussion instruments (such as a Chenda) in a rhythmic performance. Those who play in melams are called 'Melakaar'. In ancient Tamilakam (Tamil country) melams were used for all the occasions in temples (Kovil Melam, Naiyandi Melam, Urumi Melam), marriages (Ketti Melam), functions, and funerals (Parai Melam). In Kerala, the most traditional of all melams is the Pandi Melam, which is generally performed outside the temple. Another melam called the Panchari Melam, which is similar to Pandi Melam, but the Panchari Melam is played inside the temple. In Malaysia and Singapore, the most common ensemble is "urumi melam", which is a group featuring the urumi drum that plays at Hindu temples and festivals.

== History ==
Found in the list of Musical instruments used by Tamil people out in Tirumurai dated 6th to 11th century

மத்தளந் துந்துபி வாய்ந்த முருடிவற்றால்
எத்திசை தோறும் எழுந்தியம்ப - ஒத்துடனே
மங்கலம் பாடுவார் வந்திறைஞ்ச மல்லரும்
கிங்கரரும் எங்குங் கிலுகிலுப்பத்

Melam in a song sung by 8th century Andal pasuram, Nachiar Tirumozhi of (Nalayira Divya Prabandham) in Tamil literature

மத்தளம் கொட்டவ ரிசங்கம் நின்றூத,
முத்துடைத் தாம நிரைதாழ்ந்த பந்தற்கீழ்
மைத்துனன் நம்பி மதுசூதன் வந்து,என்னைக்
கைத்தலம் பற்றக் கனாக்கண்டேன் தோழீநான்.

Meaning I had a dream O friend! Drums beat and conches blew under a canopy of pearls on strings. Our Lord and cousin Madhusudana held my hand in his.

She explains her dream about the marriage with Kannan (Lord Krishna)' to her friend, detailing the decorations made in the wedding hall, processions, instruments used.

== See also ==
- Damaru
- Kovil Melam
- Parai Melam
- Udukai
- Urumee Melam
