= Kelath Aravindakshan Marar =

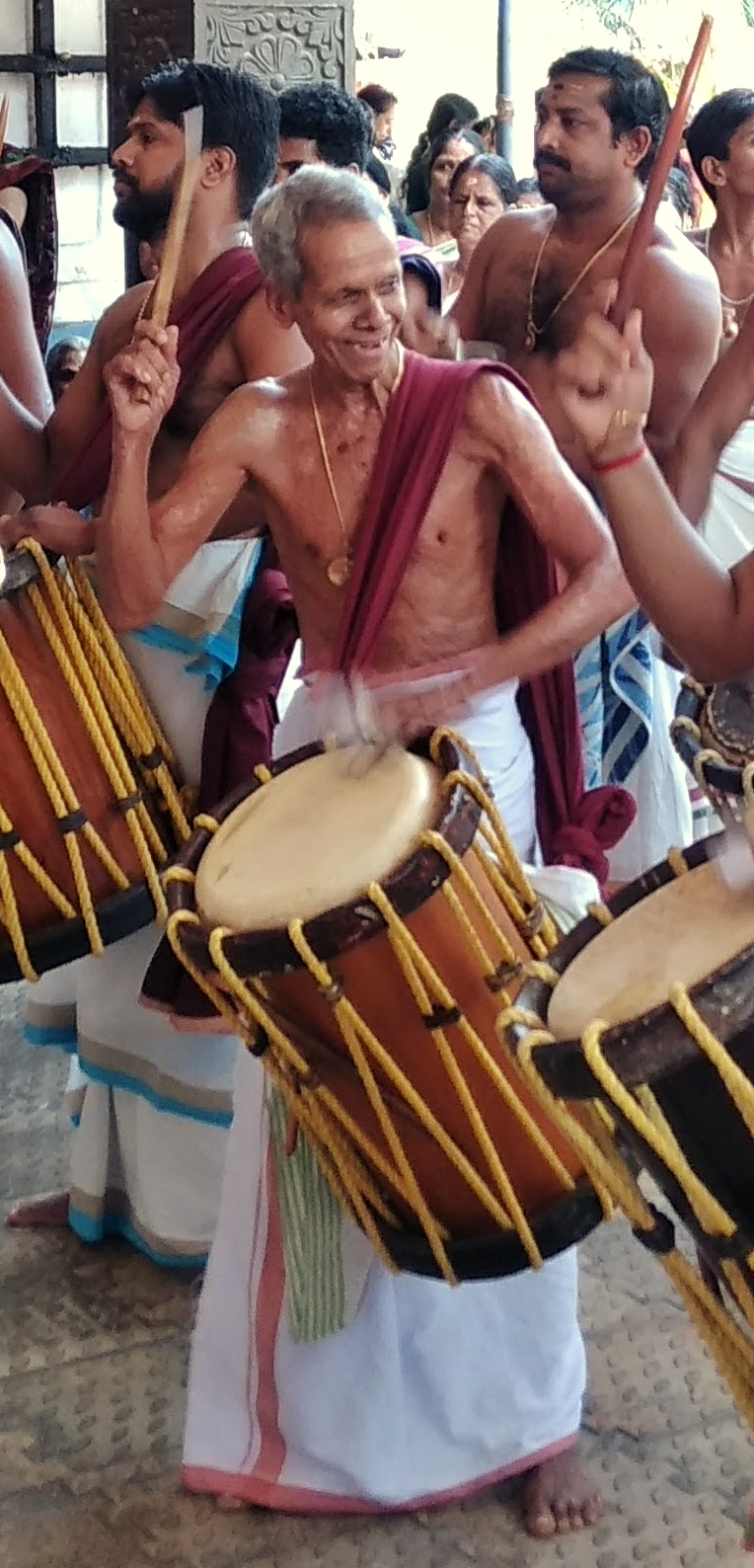
- Kelath Aravindakshan Marar performing Melam

Background information
- Born: 1942; Ollur, Trichur, Kingdom of Cochin, India
- Died: 5 May 2024 (aged 82) Thrissur, Kerala, India
- Occupation: Percussion Artist
- Instrument: Chenda
- Years active: 1954–2024

Kelath Aravindakshan Marar (1942 – 5 May 2024) was an Indian Chenda artist. He hailed from Ollur in Thrissur district of Kerala, India. Aravindakshan Marar was a regular presence in Thrissur Pooram's Ilanjiththara Melam, Peruvanam Pooram, Arattupuzha Pooram, Thrippunithura temple festival, Irinjalakuda Koodalmanikyam temple festival and other major temple festivals.

Marar was trained in percussion by his father Makoth Sankarankutty Marar. After completing his studies, he made his debut performance during Navarathri festival at Edakkunni temple at the age of 12. Marar died at Thrissur on 5 May 2024, aged 82.

== Awards and recognition ==
- Kerala Sangeetha Nataka Akademi Award for Kerala Musical Instructions - 2011
- Sriramapada golden medal from Thriprayar Temple in 2019
