= Pandi Melam =

Classical Indian percussion concert or ensemble

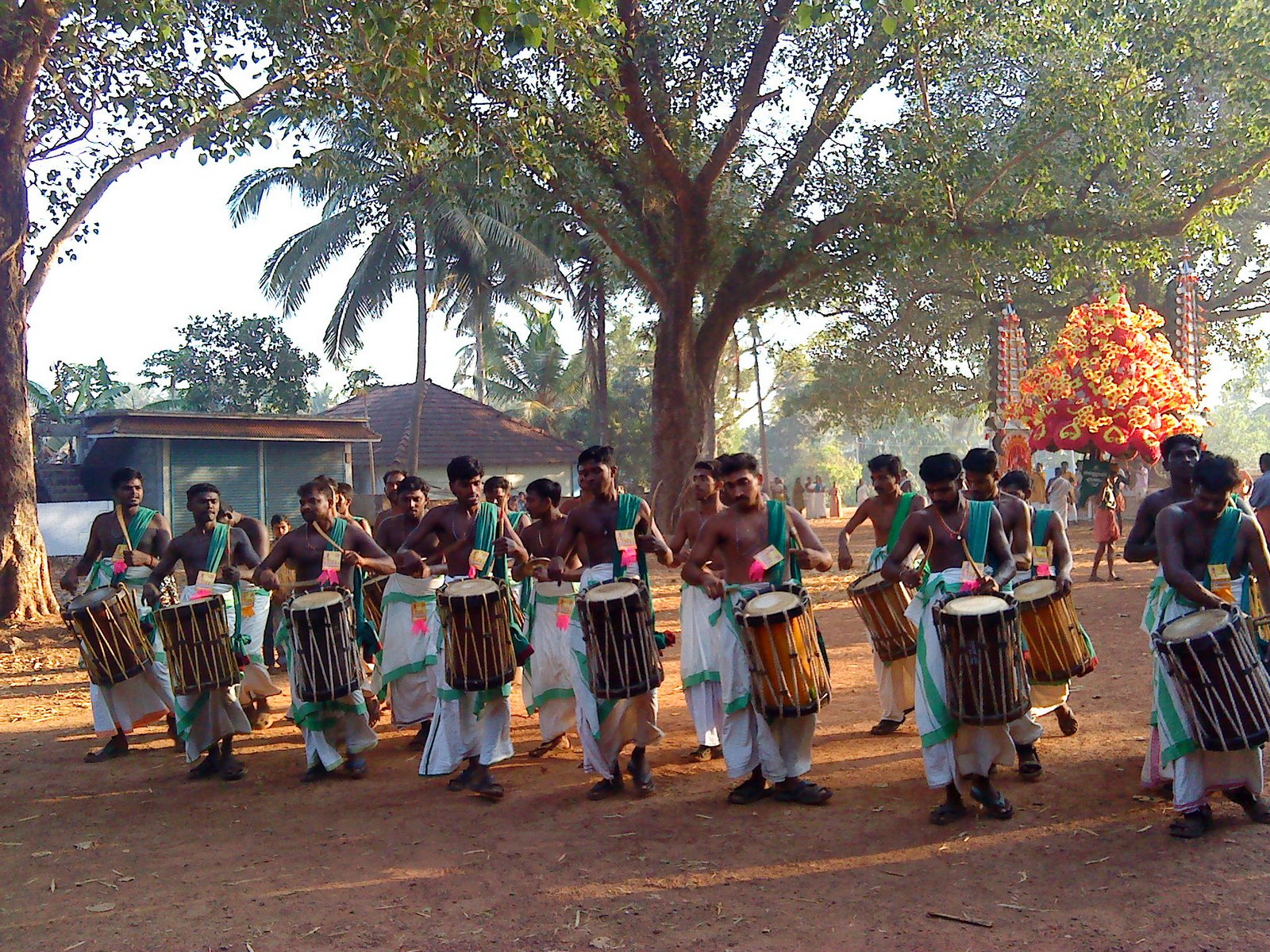
Melam

Pandi melam is a classical percussion concert or melam (ensemble) led by the ethnic Kerala instrument called the chenda and accompanied by ilathalam (cymbals), kuzhal and Kombu.

Pandi Melam
Pandi Melam

A full-length Pandi, a melam based on a thaalam (taal) with seven beats, lasts more than two-and-a-half hours, and is canonically performed outside temples. It has basically four stages, each of them with rhythmic cycles (thaalavattam) totalling 56, 28, 14 and seven respectively.

The most celebrated Pandi Melam is staged inside a temple compound at the Vadakkunnathan shrine's precincts in the central Kerala town of Thrissur. For the last several years, Peruvanam Kuttan Marar is the lead conductor for this symphony of drums known as Elanjithara Melam. Elsewhere, like in the pooram festivals of Aarattupuzha and Peruvanam near Thrissur and the rest of central and northern Kerala, it is performed outside temples.

Another ensemble called Panchari Melam, which is similar to Pandi going by the kind of instruments used but different in its rhythmic patterns and presentational gravitas, is predominantly played inside temples. Its masters (both living and dead) are ones who are specialists in Panchari Melam as well.

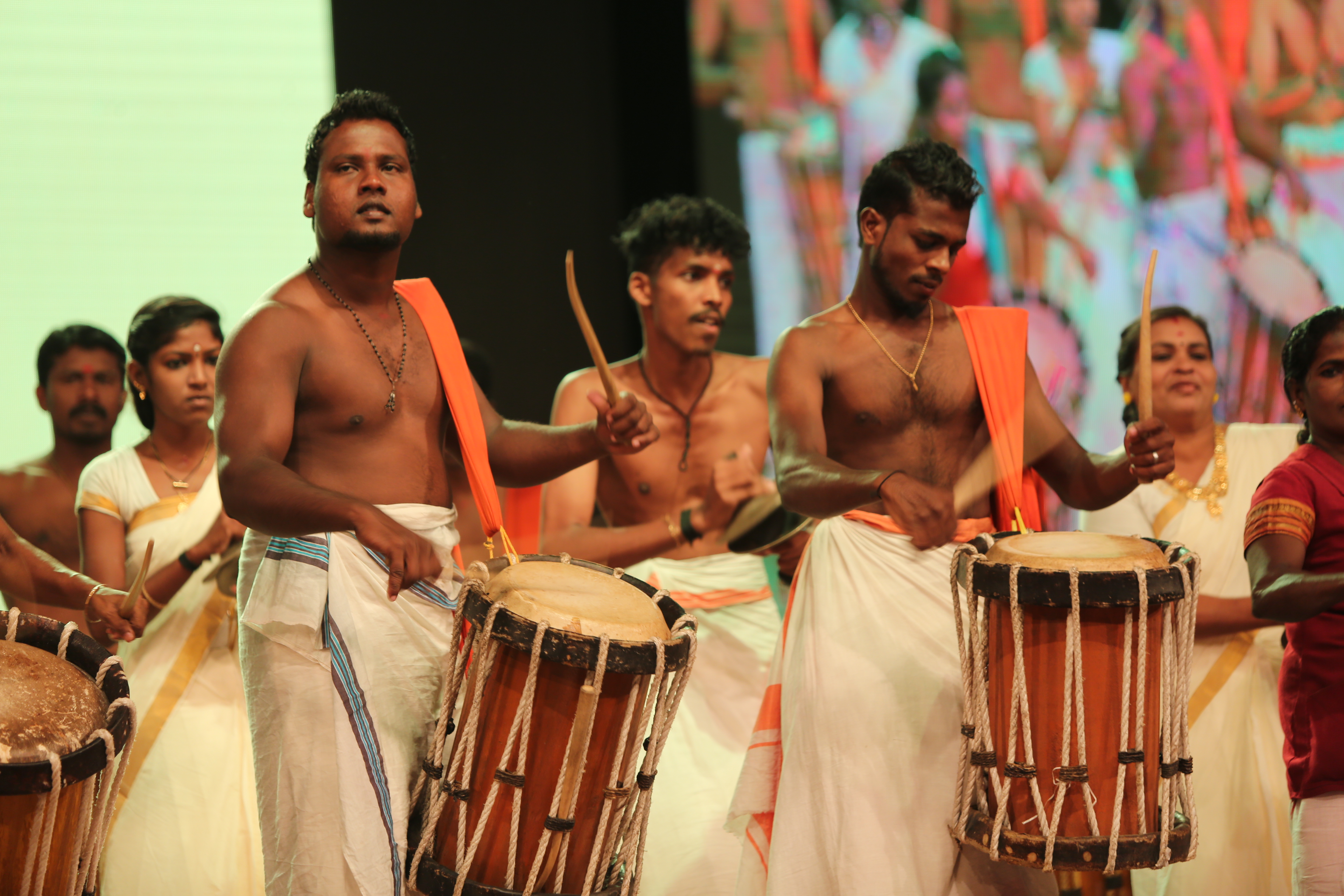
Pandi Melam Performance in Kerala Bhavan's Laying the Foundation Stone Event

The percussionist (Edamthala) who leads the Pandi melam is known as Melapramani, he will be the one who decides the duration and style of a Pandi melam. There are a lot of Melapramani in Pandi Melam stretching from the north to the south of Kerala, especially in Palakkad, Thrissur and Ernakulam. The most famous and seniors who conduct the Pandi Melam are Padma Shri Peruvanam Kuttan Maarar (who used to be the pramani of famous Ilanjithara Melam of Thrissur Pooram from 1999 to 2022), Kizhakkoottu Aniyan Maarar (the current pramani of Ilanjithara Melam), Cheranalloor Shankarankutty Maarar, and Mattannoor Sankarankutty and the current leading famous specialist of Pandi Melam is Sri RLV Mahesh Kumar.

== See also ==
- Panchari melam
- Panchavadyam
- Thayambaka
