= Kombu (instrument) =

South Indian musical instrument

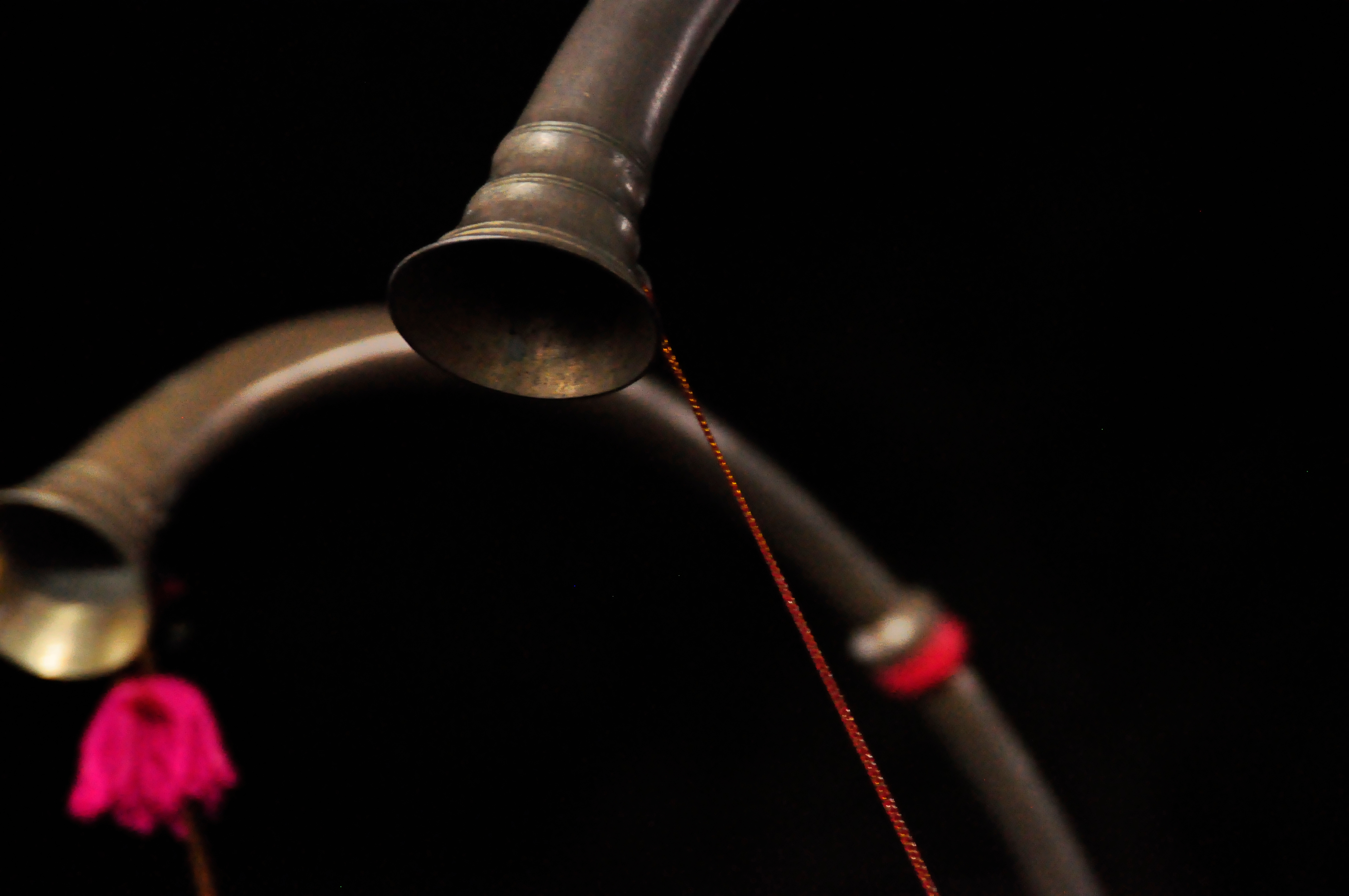
Kombu (instrument)

The kombu (Tamil: கொம்பு; Malayalam: കൊമ്പ്) or kompu, also known as kombu pattu, is a brass natural horn used primarily in the South Indian states of Tamil Nadu and Kerala. Usually played along with Panchavadyam, Pandi Melam, Panchari melam etc. This musical instrument is usually seen in south India. The instrument is like a long horn (Kombu in Tamil tulu and Malayalam).

In ancient times the kombu was played in battle, along with the murasu (kettledrum).

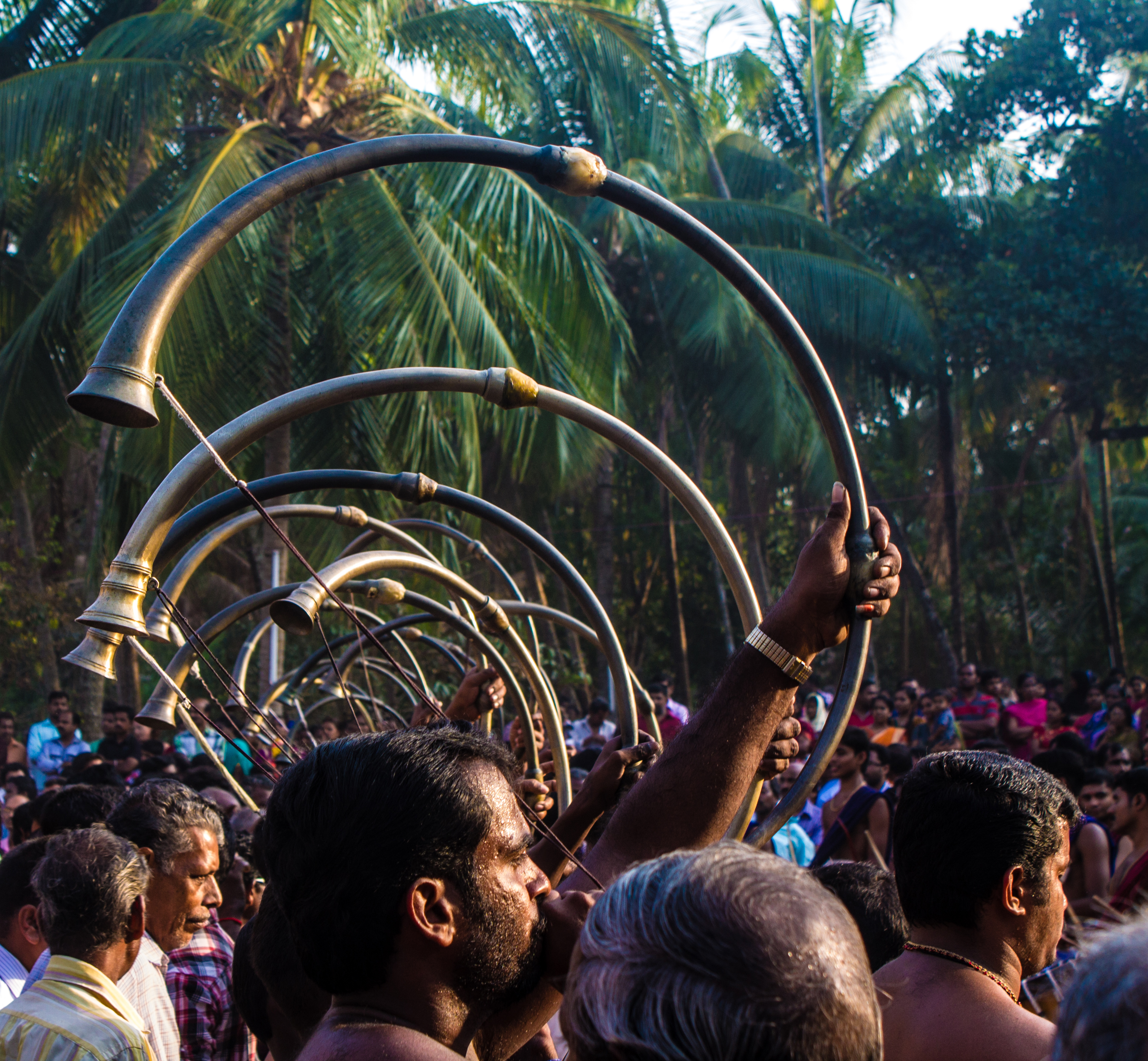
Kombu(Kahale) musical instrument being played

The size of a kombu can vary but it is approx 15 centimetres wide and 132 centimetres long. It is usually made of brass and costs about four thousand to five thousand.

== History ==
Listed one of the Musical instruments used by ancient Tamil people out in Tirumurai dated 6th to 11th century, Sangam Period.

வெல் படைத் தறுகண் வெஞ்சொல் வேட்டுவர் கூட்டம் தோறும்
சில்லரித் துடியும் கொம்பும் சிறு கண் ஆகுளியும் கூடி
கல் எனும் ஒலியின் மேலும் கறங்கிசை அருவி எங்கும் 12.0654

In recent research found that the kombu resembles trumpets being used in ancient Ireland and felt this was evidence of a link between peoples in South India and those in Ireland, 2000 years ago.

== Description ==
Modern kombu are made out of bronze either in a 'C' shape or 'S' shape.

== Usage ==
It is one of the few instrumental temple art forms in which the melody instruments dominate. Even this is only partly true, as the C-shaped trumpet, the kombu is regarded as a rhythm instrument by its players, with the function of embellishing the beats of the drums. The kombu can only produce three notes (sa, pa, and higher sa). The genre is played by a group of kombu players (3, 5, 7, or 9), led by the kombu leader. Within a given tala (rhythmic cycle), the leader improvises kombu patterns on the spot to be repeated by the chorus players.

Kumath Raman Nair (2001), the most famous solo kombu artist from Trichur, states that kombu pattu can be played in six talams (beats in brackets): chempata (8), atanta (14), dhruvam (14), chempha (10), anchatantha (16), and thriputa (7). Each cycle is accented with the accompanying ilatalam cymbals. For instance, thriputa talam is played x . x . . x . x . x . x . . (broken down to 14 pulses for diagrammatic presentation), and chempata x . x . x . u . (represented as eight pulses; 'u' indicates a silent beat). Like the other kshetram genres, kombu pattu is played in a steadily increasing tempo with decreasing rhythm units.

From: Killius, Rolf. 2006 ’Ritual Music and Hindu Rituals of Kerala.’ New Delhi: BR Rhythms. ISBN 81-88827-07-X; with author permission

== See also ==
- Panchari melam
- Panchavadyam
- Parai
- Sringa
