= Panchavadyam =

Musical art form in Kerala, India

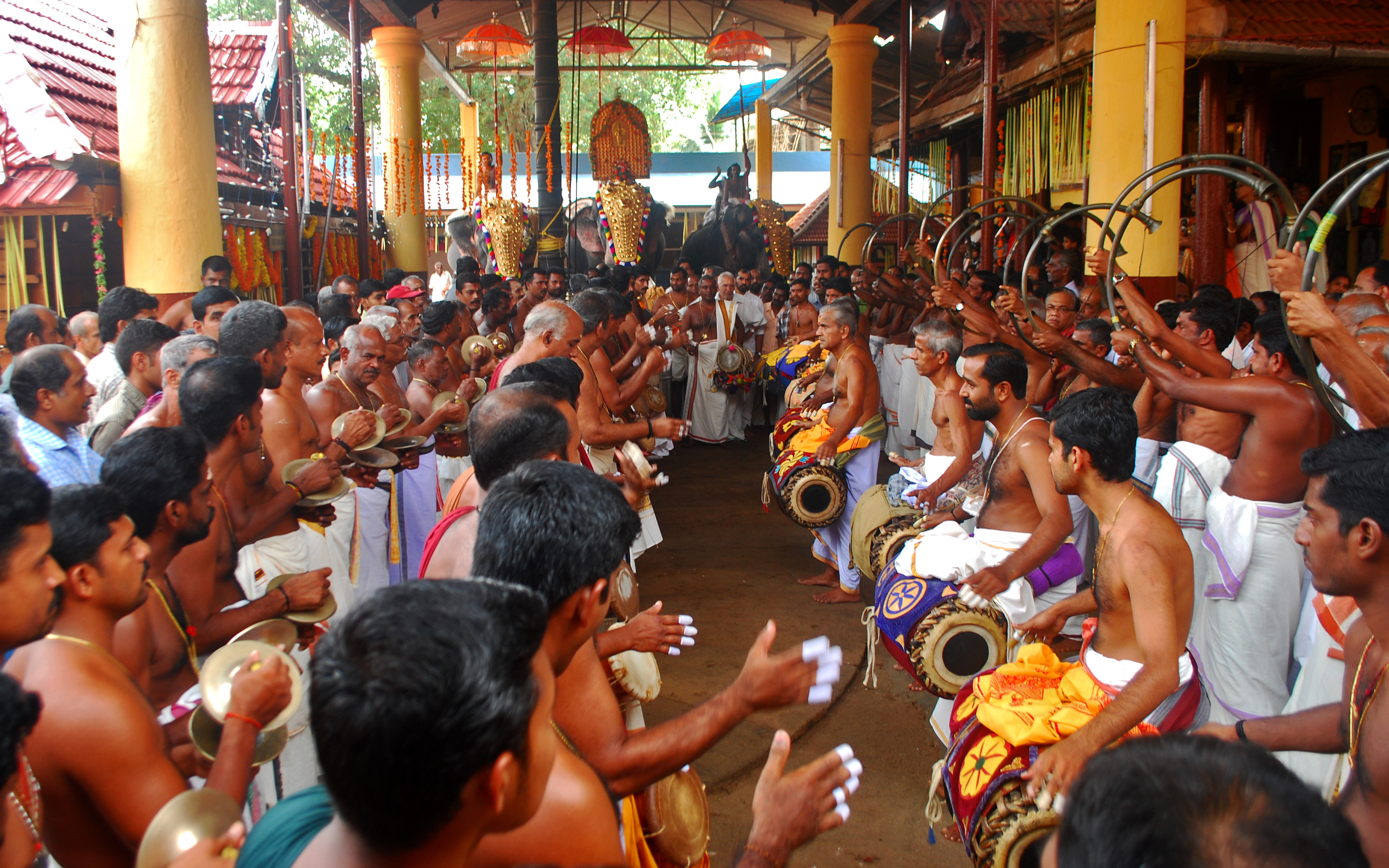
Panchavadyam Cherpulasseri Ayyappan Kaavu, Kerala, India

Panchavadyam at anandanathukavu, Ernakulam

Panchavadyam (Malayalam: പഞ്ചവാദ്യം), literally meaning an orchestra of five instruments, is basically a temple art form that has evolved in Kerala. Of the five instruments, four — timila, maddalam, ilathalam and idakka — belong to the percussion category, while the fifth, kombu, is a wind instrument.

== Description ==
Much like any chenda melam, panchavadyam is characterised by a pyramid-like rhythmic structure with a constantly increasing tempo coupled with a proportional decrease in the number of beats in cycles. However, in contrast to a chenda melam, panchavadyam uses different instruments (though ilathalam and kompu are common to both), is not related very closely to any temple ritual and, most importantly, permits much personal improvisation while filling up the rhythmic beats on the timila, maddalam and idakka.

Panchavadyam bases itself on the seven-beat thripuda (also spelt thripuda) thaalam (taal) but amusingly sticks to the pattern of the eight-beat chempata thaalam — at least until its last parts. Its pendulum beats in the first stage (pathikaalam) total 896, and halves itself with each stage, making it 448 in the second, 224 in the third, 112 in the fourth and 56 in the fifth. After this, panchavadyam has a relatively loose second half with as many stages, the pendulum beats of which would now scale down to 28, 14, 7, 3.5(three-and-a-half) and 1.

A panchavadyam is anchored and led by the timila artist at the centre of his band of instrumentalists, behind whom line up the ilathalam players. Opposite them stand the maddalam players in a row, and behind them are the kompu players. Idakka players, usually two, stand on both sides of the aisle separating the timila and maddalam line-up. A major panchavadyam will have 60 artistes.

== History ==
Whether panchavadyam is originally a feudal art is still a matter of debate among scholars, but its elaborate form in vogue today came into existence in the 1930s. It was primarily the brainchild of late maddalam artistes Venkichan Swami (Thiruvillwamala Venkateswara Iyer) and his disciple Madhava Warrier in association with late timila masters Annamanada Achutha Marar and Chengamanad Sekhara Kurup. Subsequently, it was promoted the late idakka master Pattirath Sankara Marar. They dug space for a stronger foundation (the Pathikaalam), thus making pachavadyam a five-stage (kaalam) concert with an intelligent mixture of composed and improvised parts. Spanning about two hours, it has several phrases where each set of the instruments complement the others more like harmony in the Western orchestra than the concept of melody in India. Much like in Panchari and other kinds of chenda melam, panchavadyam, too, has its artistes lined up in two oval-shaped halves, facing each other. However, unlike any classical chenda melam, panchavadyam seemingly gains pace in the early stages itself, thereby tending to sound more casual and breezy right from its start, beginning after three lengthy, stylised blows on the conch (shankhu).

Panchavadyam is still largely a temple art, but it has come out of its precincts to be seen performed during non-religious occasions like cultural pageantry and according welcome to VIPs.

== Major venues ==
Panchavadyam is performed at temple festivals across central and northern Kerala, mainly during the festival season of March and April. Among the best-known occasions are the Thrissur Pooram and the Arattupuzha Pooram. At the Thrissur Pooram, the Madathil Varavu panchavadyam of the Thiruvambady group is one of the most watched events.

== Training institutes ==
Some of the known institutions that give formal training in panchavadyam are Kerala Kalamandalam and Kshetra Kalapeetham in Vaikom and also kshethrakala kshethram kongad.

== See also ==
- Parisha Vadyam
- Pandi Melam
- Panchari melam
- Thayambaka
- Kerala Kalamandalam
- Music of Kerala
