= Thayambaka =

Type of solo musical performance

Thayambaka or tayambaka is a type of solo chenda performance that developed in the south Indian state of Kerala, in which the main player at the centre improvises rhythmically on the beats of half-a-dozen or a few more chenda and ilathalam players around.

A thayambaka performance on the chenda has thus its focus on the stick-and-palm rolls produced on the itantala (treble) of the chenda, while the rhythm is laid by his fellow instrumentalists on the valanthala (bass) chendas and ilatalam (cymbals).

== Notable practitioners ==
- Sadanam Vasudevan
- Mattannur Sankarankutty Marar
- Kalpathy Balakrishnan, * Thiruvegappura
- Pallavur Appu Marar
- Sadanam Divakara Marar.
