= Chenda =

Musical instrument

Chenda Melam (ചെണ്ട മേളം)

Pandi Melam

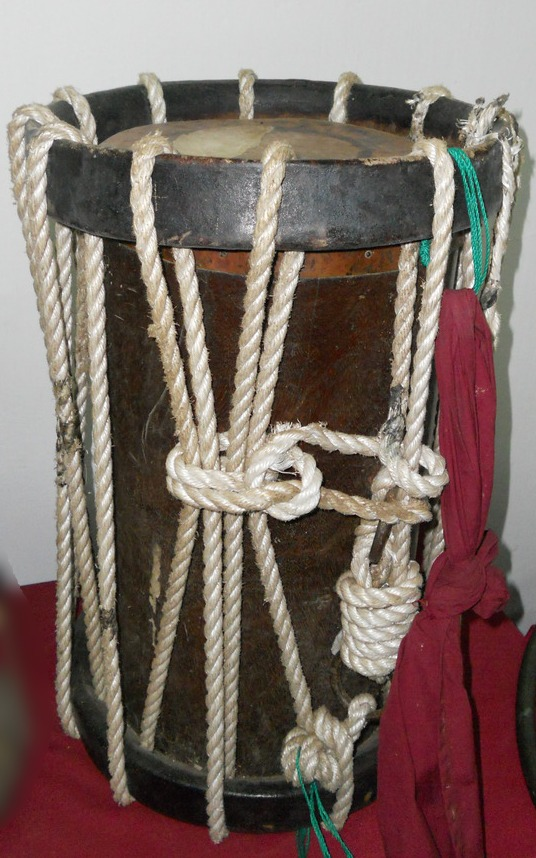
Chenda (ചെണ്ട)

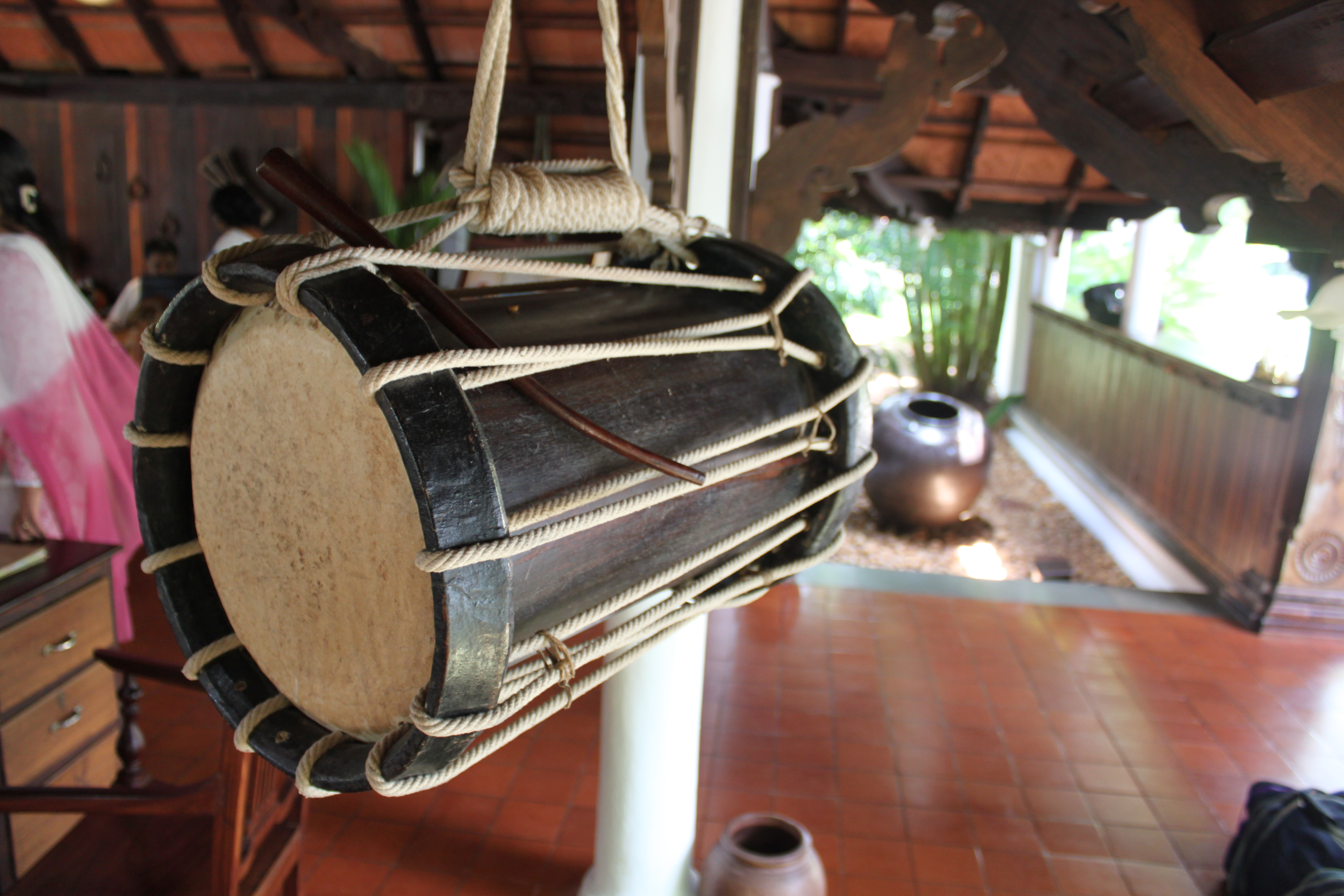
Chenda and Koal (stick) (ചെണ്ടയും കോലും)

The chenda (Malayalam: ചെണ്ട, [tʃeɳʈa]) is a cylindrical percussion instrument originating in the state of Kerala and widely used in Tulu Nadu of Karnataka in India. In Tulu Nadu (Coastal Karnataka), it is known as chende. The instrument is strongly associated with the cultural identity of both Kerala and Tulu Nadu. Traditionally, it is used by the Malayar ethnic groups in Kerala. According to their beliefs, Lord Shiva blessed them with both the chenda and matravadham, which are considered synonymous in their mantravadha tradition, where sound plays a central role.

This instrument is famous for its loud and rigid sound. A chenda has two sides, the left side called "Edamthala" (ഇടം തല)(Left Head) and the right side "Valamthala" (വലം തല)(Right Head). The "Edamthala" is made of only one/two layer of cow skin and the "Valamthala" will have a five/seven layer skin, so as to have a bass sound. The skin are dried in the shade and fastened on wooden rings (Chenda Vattam, ചെണ്ട വട്ടം) made of the trunk of a locally available palm tree (Eeranpana) or bamboo, using a gum prepared from the seed of a tree called "pananchi maram". The circular frame is kept in a vessel, boiled for an entire day and then bent in the form of circle and dried. The body of the chenda which is 1 foot (30 cm) in diameter and 1.5 inches (3.8 cm) in thickness is made of the soft wood of the jackfruit tree (വരിക്ക പ്ലാവ്) (Varikka Plavu). The thickness is again reduced by 0.25 inches (0.64 cm), at simultaneous points separated by 4 inches (10 cm). This is done in order to produce highly resonating sound. Only the wooden rings with the skin (Chenda Vattam) are replaced once the quality of the sound is not up to the mark. For regular chenda artists an average of 15 rings are required every year.

The chenda is mainly played in Hindu temple festivals and as an accompaniment in the religious art forms of Kerala. The chenda is used as an accompaniment for Kathakali, Koodiyattam, Kannyar Kali, Theyyam and among many forms of dances and rituals in Kerala. It is also played in a dance-drama called Yakshagana (Tenku Thittu) which is popular in Tulu Nadu in Karnataka. There is a variant of this instrument used in northern school of Yakshagana called Chande. It is traditionally considered to be an Asura Vadyam ((demonic instrument)) which means it cannot go in harmony. The chenda is an inevitable musical instrument in all form of cultural activities in Kerala.

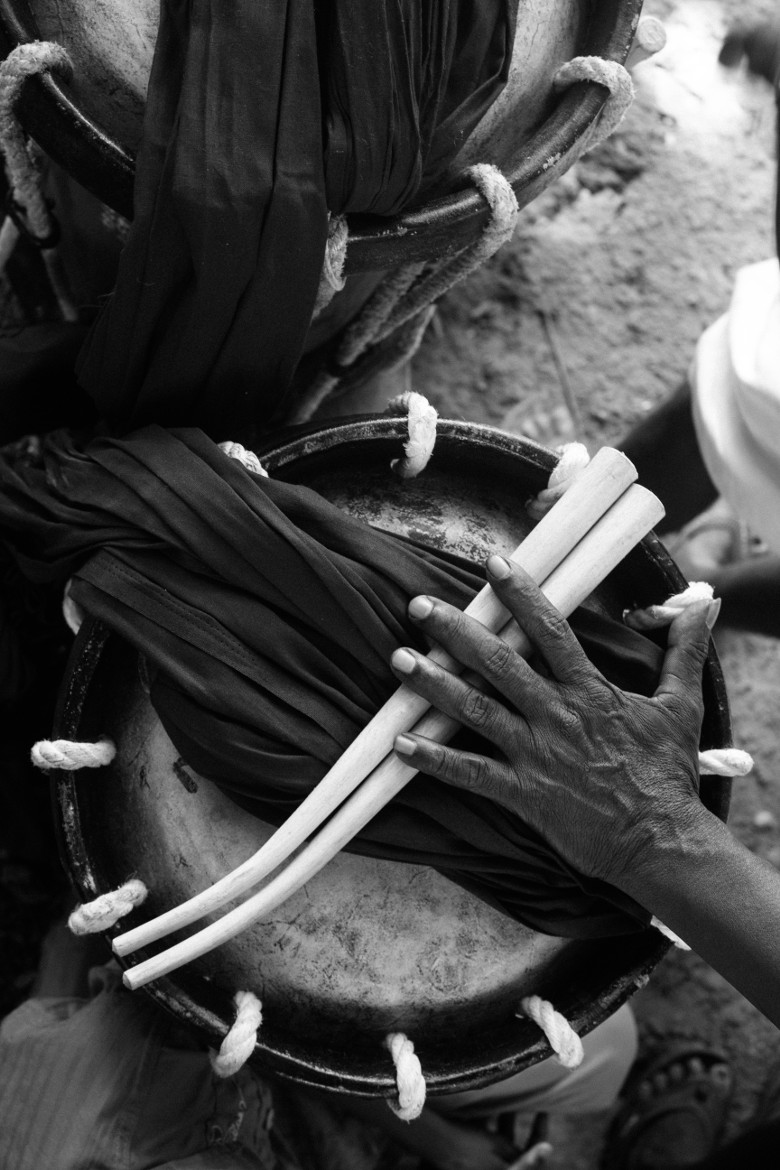
Chenda.

In Kerala the craft of making the chenda is now associated with some few "Perumkollan" (smith) families at Peruvembu, Nemmara, Lakkidi, Vellarkad and Valappaya villages. Many famous chenda percussionists in Kerala have their chendas made from Vellarkad village, which is known for the quality of the instruments made there.

== Types of Chenda ==
Chendas are of different types, depending upon the diameter of the "Chenda Vattam" (ചെണ്ട വട്ടം) they are called "Ettara Veechan Chenda" (എട്ടര വീച്ചാൺ ചെണ്ട) (8.5), "Ompathu Veechan Chenda" (ഒമ്പത് വീച്ചാൺ ചെണ്ട) (9), "Ompathe Kal Veechan Chenda" (ഒമ്പതേക്കാൽ വീച്ചാൺ ചെണ്ട)(9 1/4), "Ompathara Veechan Chenda" (ഒമ്പതര വീചാൻ ചെണ്ട)(9.5), "Ompathe Mukkal Veechan Chenda" (ഒൻപതേ മുക്കാൽ വീചാൻ ചെണ്ട) (9 3/4), "Ompathe Mukkal Kali Chenda" (ഒൻപതേ മുക്കാൽക്കാലേ വീചാൻ ചെണ്ട)(> 9 3/4 but < 10). These Chendas are used for different purposes especially for different art forms.

Depending upon the size, structure and function of the Chenda, they are classified as, "Veekku Chenda" (വീക് ചെണ്ട) or "Acchan Chenda" (അച്ഛൻ ചെണ്ട), "Uruttu Chenda" (ഉരുട്ട് ചെണ്ട), "Muri Chenda" etc.

"Uruttu Chenda" (ഉരുട്ട് ചെണ്ട) is used to play variations in music. It is used to lead the orchestra. It is called the ""Pramanavadhya"" (Leading instrument). The "Chenda Vattam" (ചെണ്ട വട്ടം) of the "Uruttu Chenda" is always the "Edam Thala" or the "Left Head" which is made of soft, single cow skin. The meaning of "uruttu" (ഉരുട്ട്) in Malayalam language is "rolling". The artist produce sound on "Uruttu Chenda" by rolling his right hand wrist. During the first beat the palm holding the stick will face the artist (in), then during the second beat (using the same right hand) the palm would face the opposite side (out). This is done by rolling the wrist.

"Veekku Chenda" (വീക്ക് ചെണ്ട) or "Acchan Chenda" (അച്ഛൻ ചെണ്ട) is used to keep the "thalam" (താളം) or the basic rhythm. The "Chenda Vattam" (ചെണ്ട വട്ടം) of the "Veekku Chenda" is always the "Valam Thala" or the "Right Head" which is made of multiple layer of skin to produce a bass sound. The meaning of "Veekku" in Malayalam language is "beating hard". The artist produce sound on "Veekku Chenda" by hitting the drum using a stick without twisting or rolling his wrist.

== Chenda Melam ==
Chendamelam of Kerala

A "Chenda Melam" means percussion using Chenda. The Chenda is used as a percussion instrument for almost all Kerala art forms like Kathakali, Kodiyattam, Theyyam etc. Chenda melam is the most popular form in Kerala, for more than 300 years. A Chenda melam is an integral part of all festivals in Kerala. There are 7 types of "melangal" viz Panchari melam, Champa, Chempada, Adantha, Anchadatha, Druvam and Pandi melam. The earlier 6 melams are called "Chempada melangal". Other than these seven "melams" two more melams are there in Kerala "Navam" and "Kalpam".

The "Chenda Vattam" or the skin used on Chenda should be very thin for classic Chenda Melam like Panchari melam, Pandi Melam or for Thayambaka but for Shingari Melam Chenda the "Chenda Vattam" are hard, which are very cheap to make. "Shingari Melam" is not considered as a classical form of art.

== Learning ==
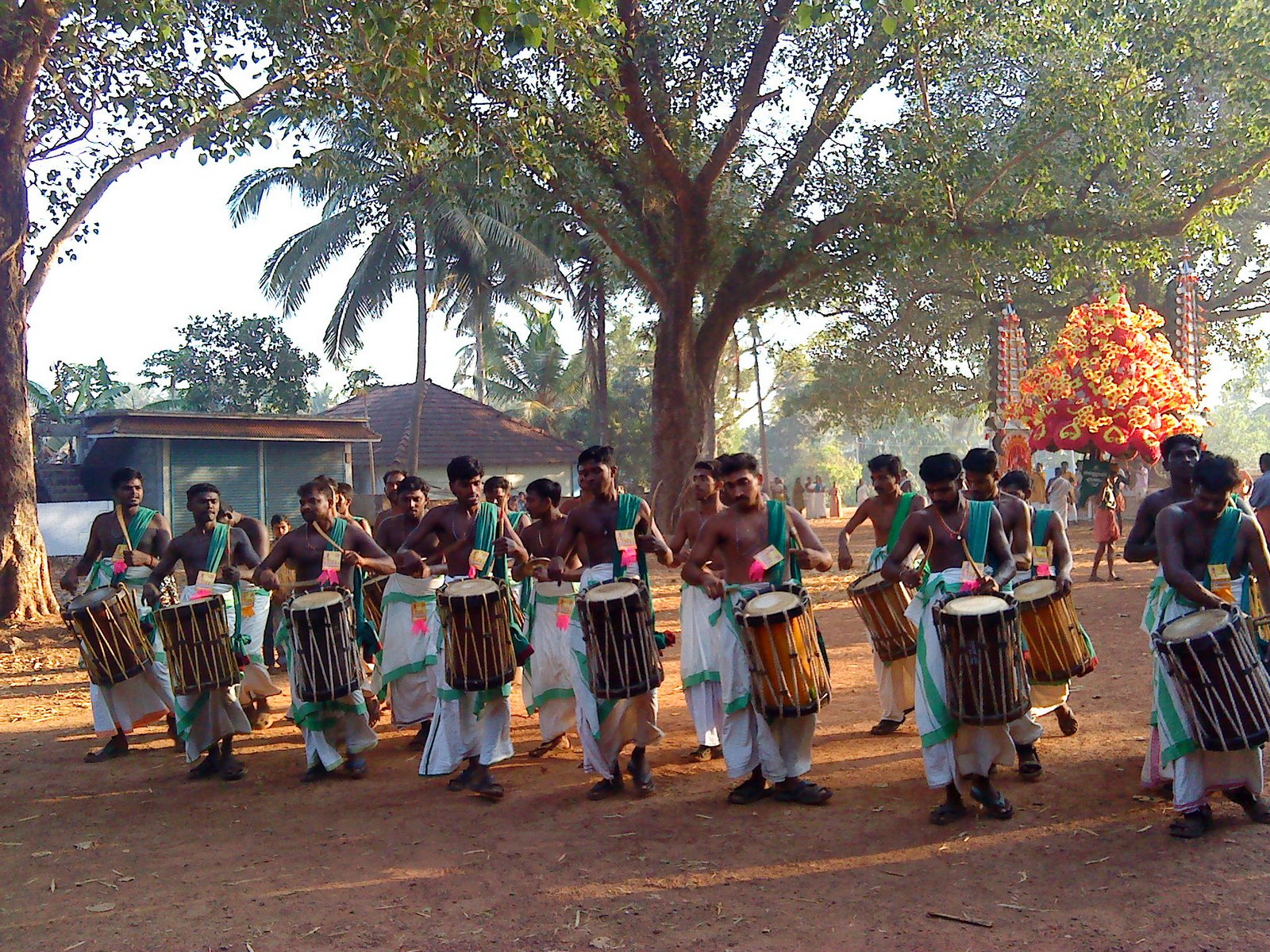
Shinkari Melam

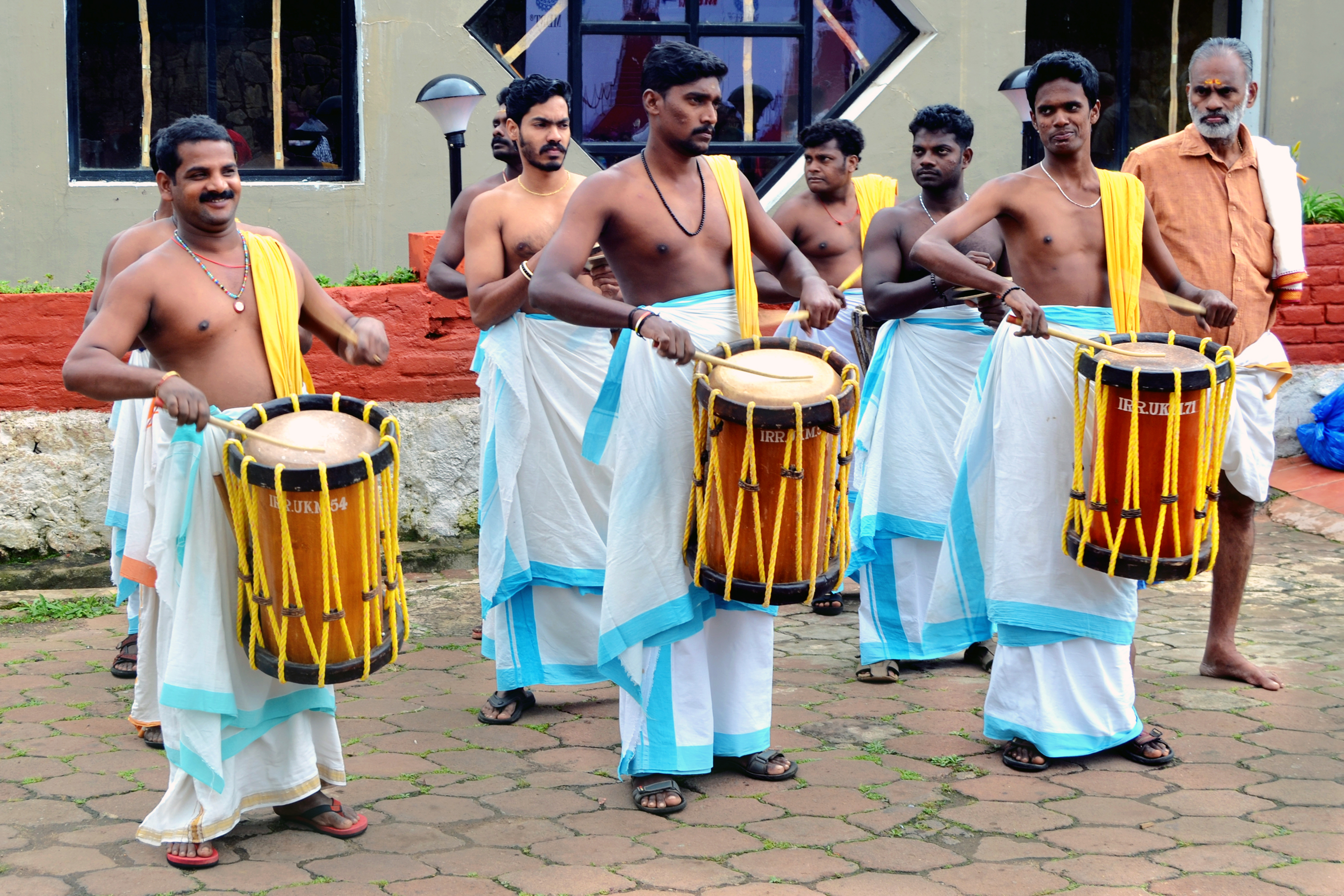

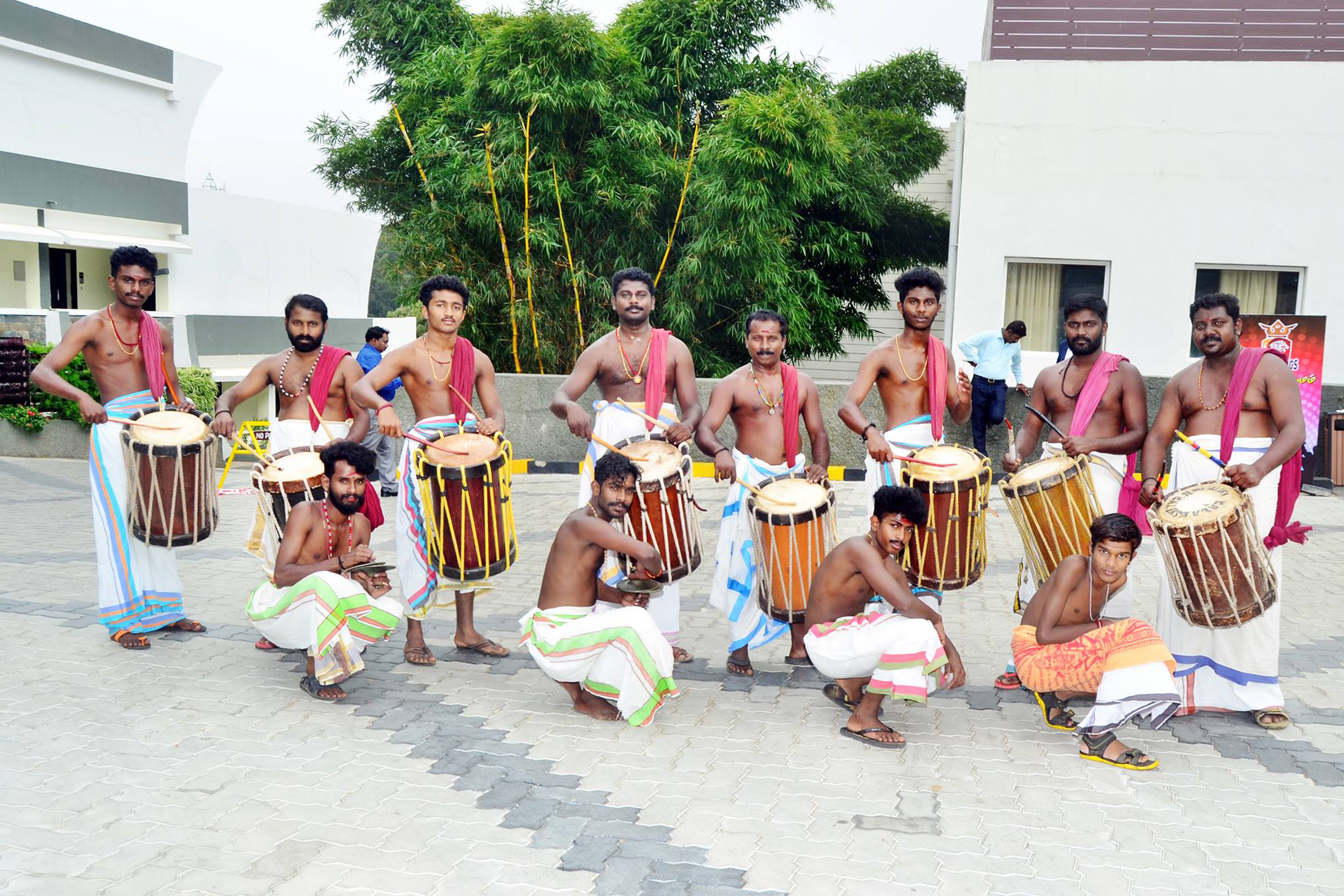
Traditional Mela of Kerala State, South India

A Chenda is taught in a traditional way, the students have to practice on a stone or wood using a strong and thick stick usually made of tamarind tree bark. The learning stick would be 29 cm in length, 3 cm in diameter on one side and 2.5 cm on other side of the stick. Once the learning on stone is finished, students learn on Veekku Chenda (വീക് ചെണ്ട) or the Valam Thala (വലം തല) part of the Chenda which is made of multiple layer of skin. The "Valam Thala Chenda" is played using a long and thin stick. Once the students master to play on "Valam Thala Chenda", the students start learning on the Uruttu Chenda (ഉര്രുട്ട് ചെണ്ട) or the Edam Thala (ഇടം തല) part of the Chenda which will have only one layer of skin.

While striking on a Chenda with two sticks, the stick on the right hand is hit on the upper part (little above the center part) of the "Chenda Vattam" and the stick on the left hand is hit on the lower part (little below the center) of the "Chenda Vattam".

In Kerala a traditional Chenda learning always start and end with a "Ganapathi Kai" (ഗണപതി കൈ), it is a prayer and dedication done to the Hindu deity Ganapathi.

A "Ganapathi Kai" consists of 37 beats.

Gi... Kam...

Na.Ka. Tha.Ra. Kaam...

Dha.Ri. Ki.Da. Dhi.Ka. Tha.Ra. Kaam...

Na.Ka. Tha.Ra. Kaam...

Dhi.Ki. Na.Na. Kaam...

Dhi.Dhi

Dha.Ri. Ki.Da. Dhi.Ka. Tha.Ra. Kaam...

Here the letters starting with "G" (ഗീ) and "K" (ക) are beaten using left hand and others by right hand.

ഗീ.... കാം......

ണ ക ത ര കാം

ധി രി കി ട ണ ക ത ര കാം

ണ ക ത ര കാം

ധി കാം... ധി കാം...

ഡ്

ധി രി കി ട ത ക ത ര കാം

Once the students learn how to do "Ganapathi Kai" (ഗണപതി കൈ), the master starts teaching Chenda "Sadhakam" (സാധകം) or repeated exercise. Usually a "Sadhakam" starts with a three beat Sadhakam called "Tha Ki Ta" Sadhakam (ത കി ട സാധകം).

A "Tha Ki Ta" Sadhakam (ത കി ട സാധകം) or the three beat Sadhakam starts with an "Onnam Kaalam" (ഒന്നാം കാലം) or the first degree of geometric speed. Which is the "thalam" (താളം) or the basic rhythm throughout the Percussion performance (melam). Once the "Onnam Kaalam" is practiced the students learn to exercise the "Randam Kaalam" (രണ്ടാം കാലം) or the second degrees of geometric speed, then the "Muunaam Kaalam" (മൂനാം കാലം) or the third degrees of geometric speed and so on.

For a "Tha Ki Ta" Sadhakam the "Onnam Kaalam" is 3 beats in a geometric speed. So the "Randam Kaalam" (രണ്ടാം കാലം) beats would be multiple of "Onnam Kaalam", 6 beats. "Muunaam Kaalam" (മൂനാം കാലം) would be multiple of "Randam Kaalam", 12 beats, "Naalam Kaalam" (നാലാം കാലം) would be 24 beats and so on. While doing a "Randam Kaalam", 6 beats should finish by the time taken for the 3 beats of "Onnam Kaalam". Similarly the "Muunaam Kaalam" (12 beats) should finish by the time taken for the 3 beats of "Onnam Kaalam". For a "Naalam Kaalam", 24 beats should finish by the time taken for the "Onnam Kaalam". That is the reason the "Onnam Kaalam" is called the "thalam" (താളം) or the basic rhythm (time taken to complete a cycle of beats, here for "Tha Ki Ta", 3 beats).

"Vaai Thari" (വായി താരി), the drum like sound made by the student while beating on the Chenda. "Vaai Thari" of Tha-Ki-Ta in 1st 2nd 3rd and 4th "Kaalam".

1. Ki-(Ta) Tha-(Ka) Tha-(Ri) → Here even if 6 sounds are produced only three beats are done.

2. Ki-Ta Tha-Ka Tha-Ri → Here 6 sounds are produced and 6 beats are done.

3. Ki-Ta-Tha-Ka Tha-Ri-Ki-Ta Tha-Ka-Tha-Ri → 12 sounds are produced and 12 beats are done.

4. Ki-Ta-Tha-Ka-Tha-Ri-Ki-Ta Tha-Ka-Tha-Ri-Ki-Ta-Tha-Ka Tha-Ri-Ki-Ta-Tha-Ka-Tha-Ri

1. കീ...ട ത...ക താ...രി

2. കീ...ട ത...ക താ...രി

3. കിട.തക തരി.കിട തക.തരി

4. കിടതക.തരികിട തകതരി.കിടതക തരികിട.തകതരി

== Kaalam concepts ==
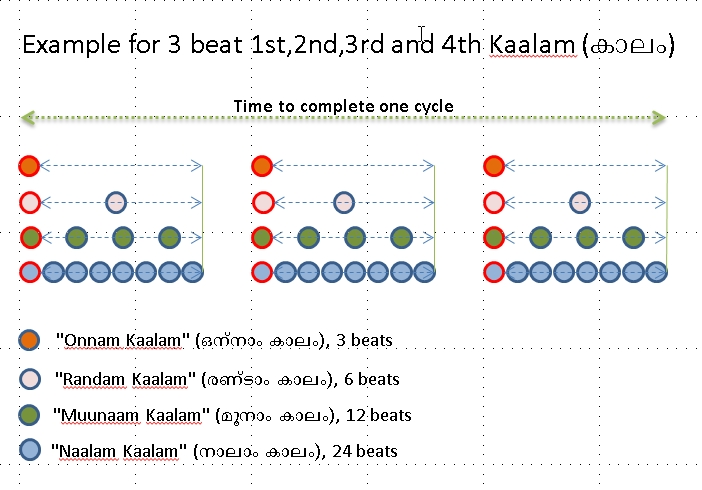
Different "Kalam" (കാലം), degree of geometric speed

"Kaalam" (കാലം) is a degree of geometric speed. A "Kalam" starts with an "Onnam Kaalam" (ഒന്നാം കാലം) or the first degree of geometric speed. Which is the "thalam" (താളം) or the basic rhythm throughout the percussion performance (melam). Once the "Onnam Kaalam" is practiced the students learn to exercise the "Randam Kaalam" (രണ്ടാം കാലം) or the second degrees of geometric speed, then the "Moonnaam Kaalam" (മൂന്നാം കാലം) or the third degrees of geometric speed Then the "Naalam Kaalam" or the fourth degree of geometric speed and so on. Depending up on the practice and experience a Chenda performer can perform in 7, 8, 9 or even 10 "Kaalam".

If a performer starts with a 3 beat and completes these beats in 4 seconds (geometric speed), it is called an "Onnam Kaalam" (ഒന്നാം കാലം) of 3 beats. So the "Randam Kaalam" (രണ്ടാം കാലം) beats would be multiple of "Onnam Kaalam", 6 beats completed in 4 seconds. "Muunaam Kaalam" (മൂനാം കാലം) would be multiple of "Randam Kaalam", 12 beats completed in 4 seconds, "Naalam Kaalam" (നാലാം കാലം) would be 24 beats completed in 4 seconds and so on. Similarly if the performer starts with 4 beats and completes the beats in 4 seconds, then "Randam Kaalam" beats would be multiple of "Onnam Kaalam", 8 beats completed in 4 seconds, "Muunaam Kaalam" would be multiple of "Randam Kaalam", 16 beats completed in 4 seconds. If the performer starts with the same 4 beats and completes the beats in 2 seconds, then "Randam Kaalam" would be 8 beats and should be completed in 2 seconds, "Muunaam Kaalam" would be 16 beats and should be completed in 2 seconds.

The time to complete one "Kaalam" is called the "Thalavattam" (താളവട്ടം) and the "Onnam Kaalam" (ഒന്നാം കാലം) is called the "thalam" (താളം) or the basic rhythm of the whole percussion performance.

== See also ==
- Panchavadyam
- Thayambaka
- Panchari melam
- Pandi melam
- Kanyarkali
- Vadyakala
