= Music of Kerala =

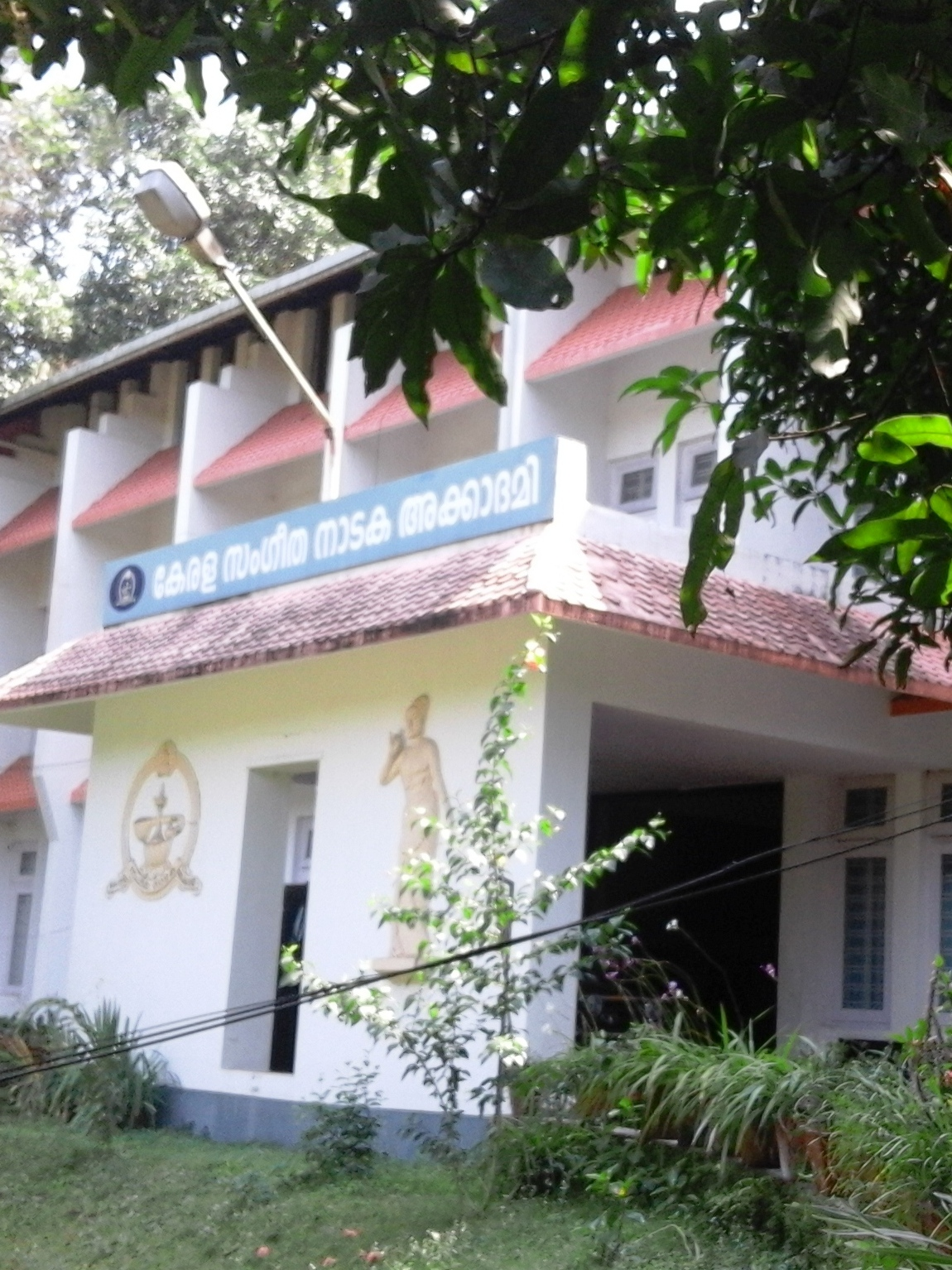
Kerala Music and Drama Academy, Thrissur

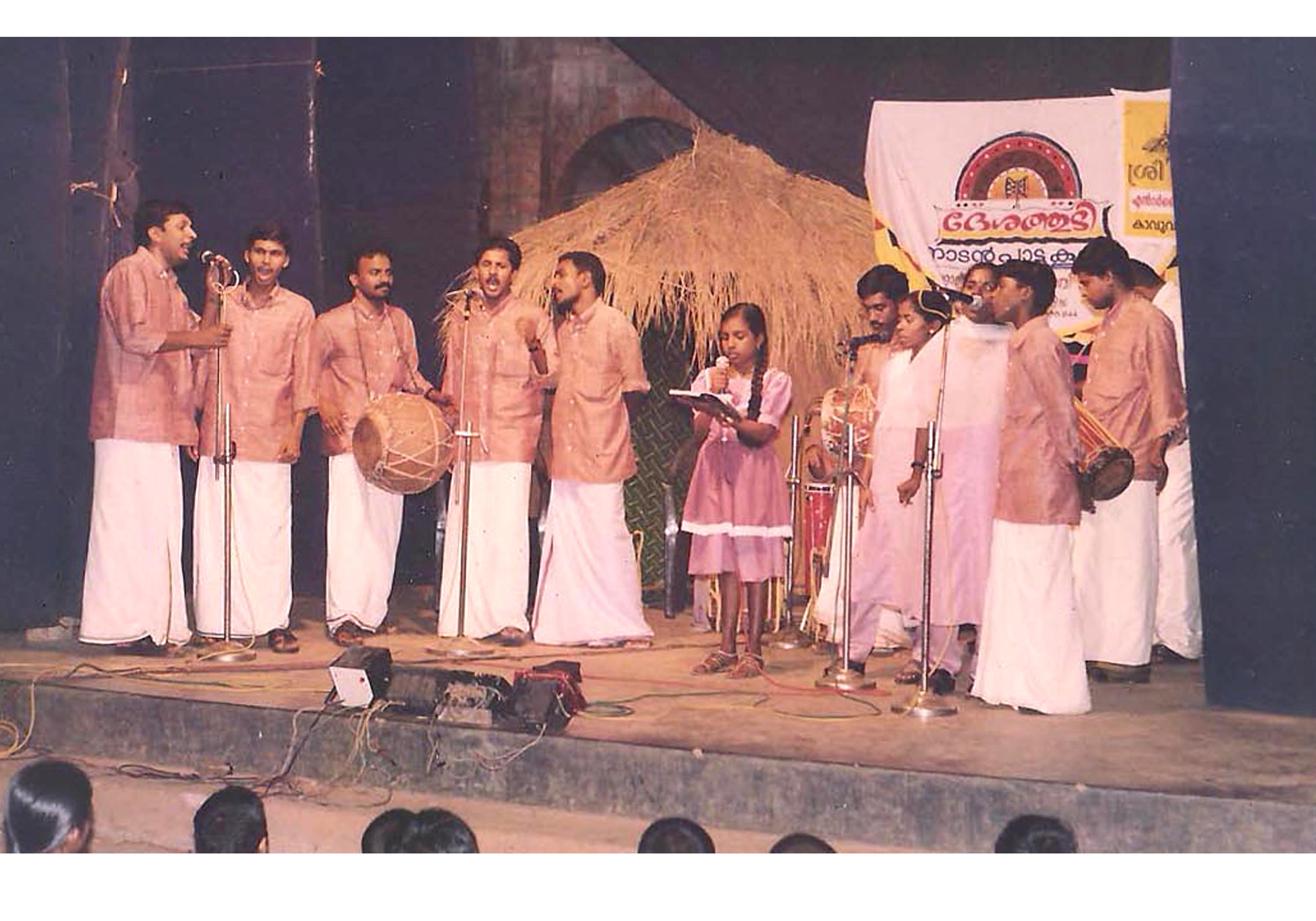
folksong performance of Desathudi Folkgroup, Pattambi, Kerala, India

== Introduction ==
The state of Kerala has a very extensive and rich musical tradition. The songs formed contain remnants of Malayalam literature dating back to the ninth century CE. The significance of folk poetry and music was established through the Malayalam language.

The music in this area was developed in a number of different directions. These branches comprised classical Carnatic music as well as popular music from albums, movies, and other genres. Chenda Melam is renowned for his music.

Kerala music has a complex history distinct from Malayalam poetry, with which it is often associated. Though it is often driven by poetry, Kerala also has its roots in Carnatic music. Songs have always been a significant part of early Malayalam literature dating back to the 9th century CE. The significance of music in Kerala's culture can be deduced from the musical poetry that developed in the Malayalam language long before prose. As music evolved in the region, various branches emerged from it

== History ==
The earliest written record of Malayalam is the Edakal-5 inscription, dating to around the 4th century CE. Early Malayalam literature comprised three types of composition:

- Classical songs (Naadan Paattu).
- Manipravalam of the Sanskrit tradition, which permitted a generous interspersing of Sanskrit with Tamil.
- Folk songs rich in native elements.

Malayalam poetry up to the late 20th century CE exhibits varying degrees of fusion among three distinct strands. The oldest examples of Pattu (classical songs) are Ramacharitam and Vaishikatantram, both from the 12th century. These works play a significant role in defining the cultural heritage of Kerala.

== Classical music ==
Kerala is renowned for Sopana Sangeetham, a form of classical music originating in the temples of the region. Sopanam, its precursor, has religious roots and evolved through the chanting of invocatory songs at the kalam of Kali, later extending to performances inside temples. Its popularity surged with the increasing fame of Jayadeva's Gita Govinda or Ashtapadis. Sopana Sangeetham, meaning "music of the steps," is typically sung beside the holy steps (sopanam) leading to the sanctum sanctorum of a shrine. It is sung with plain notes, often accompanied by the idakka, a small hourglass-shaped drum, and the chengila, a metallic gong for rhythm. Traditionally, Sopanam is performed by men from the Marar and Pothuval communities, who belong to Ambalavasi (semi-Brahmin) castes and have inherited the practice as their profession. Notable sopanam singers include Neralattu Rama Poduval, Janardhanan Nedungadi, and Damodara Marar.

Kerala is renowned for its contributions to Carnatic music. Notable figures such as Swathi Tirunal, Irayimman Thampi, Shadkala Govinda Marar, Chembai Vaidyanatha Bhagavatar, V. Dakshinamoorthy, P Leela, K. J. Yesudas, K.G Jayan (Jayavijaya), Palghat Mani Iyer, Vidwan Gopala Pillai, Chertala Gopalan Nair, M. D. Ramanathan, T. V. Gopalakrishnan, M. K. Sankaran Namboothiri, Mavelikara Krishnankutty Nair, Neyyattinkara Mohanachandran, Neyyattinkara Vasudevan, T. N. Krishnan, and T. S. Nandakumar have emerged as prominent musical exponents from the region. In the younger generation, individuals like L. Athira Krishna, a child prodigy violinist, and P. Unnikrishnan, a Carnatic vocalist, have garnered recognition in the international music scene, contributing to the preservation and continuation of the rich tradition of Carnatic music.

Kerala also boasts a notable presence of Hindustani music. The king of Travancore, Swathi Thirunal, played a significant role in patronizing and contributing to Kerala's musical heritage.

== Popular music ==
The popular music of Kerala has evolved alongside its classical music tradition until they diverged. Film music has played a significant role in enriching the popular music scene in Kerala. Other forms of popular music include light music, pop music, and devotional songs.

=== Kathakali music ===
The songs used in Kathakali performances are typically in Manipravalam, a blend of Malayalam and Sanskrit. While most songs adhere to ragas from Carnatic music, they are rendered in a distinctive style known as the Sopanam style, which is rooted in Kerala's temple singing tradition. Kalamandalam Krishnan Nair was one of the foremost artists in this field. Kalamandalam, located in Vallathol Nagar near Shornur, Thrissur, is a prominent training center for Kathakali. Despite initial resistance due to its association with temple art, Kathakali gained widespread popularity, with artists like Hyderali transcending cultural barriers. However, Hyderali's interpretation softened the original Asura nature of the art. Kalamandalam Gangadharan, one of the last proponents of the traditional style, has largely retired from active performance.

=== Malayalam film music ===
Film music, a genre synonymous with playback singing in Indian music, holds significant cultural prominence nationwide. In Kerala, film music stands out as the most widely embraced form of musical expression, enjoying widespread popularity among the state's populace. Before the emergence of Malayalam cinema and its distinct film music, the people of Kerala avidly followed Tamil and Hindi film songs, a practice that persists to this day. The history of Malayalam film songs traces back to the 1948 film Nirmala, produced by Artist P.J. Cherian, which marked the introduction of playback singing in Malayalam cinema. The film's music composer was P. S. Divakar, and the songs were rendered by P. Leela, T. K. Govinda Rao, Vasudeva Kurup, C. K. Raghavan, Sarojini Menon, and Vimala B. Varma, credited as the first playback singer in Malayalam cinema.

In the early years, Malayalam film music often incorporated tunes from popular Hindi or Tamil songs. However, a shift occurred in the early 1950s with the emergence of several poets and musicians in the Malayalam music scene. By the mid-1950s, the Malayalam Film Music Industry began to develop its own distinctive identity. This transformation was spearheaded by music directors such as Brother Laxmanan, G. Devarajan, V. Dakshinamurthy, M.S. Babu Raj, and K. Raghavan, alongside lyricists including Vayalar Rama Varma, P. Bhaskaran, O. N. V. Kurup, and Sreekumaran Thampi. During the golden age of Malayalam music (1960 to 1970), major playback singers included Kamukara Purushothaman, K. P. Udayabhanu, A. M. Raja, P. Leela, Santha P. Nair, P. Susheela, P. Madhuri, and S. Janaki. These singers gained significant popularity across Kerala. In later years, several non-Malayali singers, such as Manna Dey, Talat Mahmood, Lata Mangeshkar, Asha Bhosle, Hemalata, and S. P. Balasubrahmanyam, also contributed to Malayalam films. Similarly, composers from other language industries, including Naushad Ali, Usha Khanna, M. B. Sreenivasan, Bombay Ravi, Shyam, Bappi Lahiri, Laxmikant–Pyarelal, Salil Chowdhury, Ilaiyaraaja, Vishal Bhardwaj, and A. R. Rahman, were involved in scoring music for Malayalam films to some extent. The cross-industry contributions in South Indian film music can be attributed to its parallel growth pattern across the region.. The period from the late 1950s to the mid-1970s is often regarded as the golden era of Malayalam film music, characterized by its distinct identity. During this time, prominent music directors such as M. B. Sreenivasan, M. K. Arjunan, Pukezhenty Vellappan Nair, M. S. Viswanathan, A. T. Ummer, R. K. Shekhar, and Salil Choudhury, along with lyricists like Thirunainar Kurichi Madhavan Nair, Mankombu Gopalakrishnan, and Bharanikkavu Sivakumar, produced numerous timeless and highly popular songs. The music was known for its soft melodies and high-quality lyrics, which captivated music lovers.

K. J. Yesudas, who made his debut in 1961, and P. Jayachandran significantly influenced the Malayalam film music industry, becoming widely acclaimed along with K.S. Chitra. The trio of Vayalar, G. Devarajan, and Yesudas produced unforgettable songs, akin to the earlier trio of Kamukara, Tirunainaarkurichy, and Brother Laxmanan. Yesudas gained popularity not only among film music enthusiasts but also within the classical music audience. He, along with P. Jayachandran, significantly contributed to the evolution of Malayalam playback singing during the 1960s and 1970s. K. S. Chithra, who made her debut in 1979, rose to prominence by the mid-eighties, becoming one of the most sought-after female singers in South India.

By the late 1970s, there was a shift in musical trends towards more rhythm-oriented songs with a Western touch, led by music directors like Shyam, K. J. Joy, and Jerry Amaldev. During this period, lyricists often had to adapt their lyrics to fit the tunes, which sometimes led to criticism regarding the quality of the songs. However, from 1979 to 1980, music directors such as Raveendran, Johnson, and M. G. Radhakrishnan spearheaded a second reformation of Malayalam film music, creating melodious and classical-oriented compositions rooted in the cultural heritage of Kerala. Lyricists like Poovachal Khader, Kavalam Narayana Panicker, and Bichu Thirumala in the 1980s, and Kaithapram Damodaran Namboothiri and Gireesh Puthenchery in the 1990s, played significant roles in this musical transformation. Contributions from composers like Kannur Rajan, Bombay Ravi, S. P. Venkatesh, Mohan Sithara, Ouseppachan, Sharath, Vidyadharan, Raghukumar, and Vidyasagar were also notable during this period. Singers such as K. J. Yesudas, K. S. Chitra, M. G. Sreekumar, G. Venugopal, Unni Menon, and Sujatha Mohan were active during this time as well. A notable aspect in the later years was the extensive use of classical Carnatic music in many film songs of the 1980s and 1990s, with films like Chithram (1988), His Highness Abdullah (1990), Bharatham (1991), Sargam (1992), and Sopanam (1993) incorporating classical Carnatic elements.

Currently, prominent figures in the Malayalam music scene include composers such as M. Jayachandran, Bijibal, Rex Vijayan, Rahul Raj, Prashant Pillai, Shaan Rahman, Sushin Shyam, Jakes Bejoy, Gopi Sundar, Alphonse, and Rajesh Murugesan. Notable lyricists include Rafeeq Ahmed, Anwar Ali, B. K. Harinarayanan, Vinayak Sasikumar, and Vayalar Sarath, while singers like Vineeth Sreenivasan, Vijay Yesudas, Shweta Mohan, Manjari, and Jyotsna Radhakrishnan also contribute significantly to the industry, among others.

National Award-winning music composers of Malayalam cinema include Johnson (1994, 1995), Bombay Ravi (1995), Ouseppachan (2008), Ilaiyaraaja (2010), Issac Thomas Kottukapally (2011), Bijibal (2012), and M. Jayachandran (2015). Johnson's 1995 award for the film score of Sukrutham (1994) marked the first instance of the award being given for a film score rather than songs, a distinction he shared with Bombay Ravi, who won for composing songs for the same film. In 2010 and 2011, awards were specifically given for film scores, with Malayalam films winning both years: Pazhassi Raja (2010, Score: Ilaiyaraaja) and Adaminte Makan Abu (2011, Score: Issak Thomas Kottakapally). Ravindran received a Special Jury Award in 1992 for composing songs for the film Bharatham.

Lyricists who have won the National Award include Vayalar Ramavarma (1973), O. N. V. Kurup (1989), and Yusuf Ali Kechery (2001). Among male singers, K. J. Yesudas has won the award multiple times (1972, 1973, 1987, 1991, 1993, 2017), along with P. Jayachandran (1986) and M. G. Sreekumar (1991, 2000). Yesudas also won two additional National Awards for singing in Hindi (1977) and Telugu (1983) films, making him the most awarded male playback singer with seven awards. Female singers who have won the award include S. Janaki (1981) and K. S. Chithra (1987, 1989). Chithra has also won the award for Tamil (1986, 1997, 2005) and Hindi (1998) film songs, making her the most awarded female playback singer with six awards.

=== Mappila Pattu ===
The Malabar region of Kerala, known for its significant Muslim population, has developed a distinctive music tradition influenced by Hindustani styles. This tradition encompasses various forms, including ghazals and mappila pattu, as well as music for traditional Muslim dance forms like oppana and kolkali. Poetry plays a central role in this musical stream, which is primarily in Malayalam but incorporates Arabic words, creating a linguistic blend known as Arabimalayalam. Mappila songs are particularly notable for their unique charm, reflecting a fusion of Kerala's local culture and the influences of West Asia. These songs cover a wide range of themes, including religion, love, satire, and heroism.

=== Knanaya Folk Songs ===
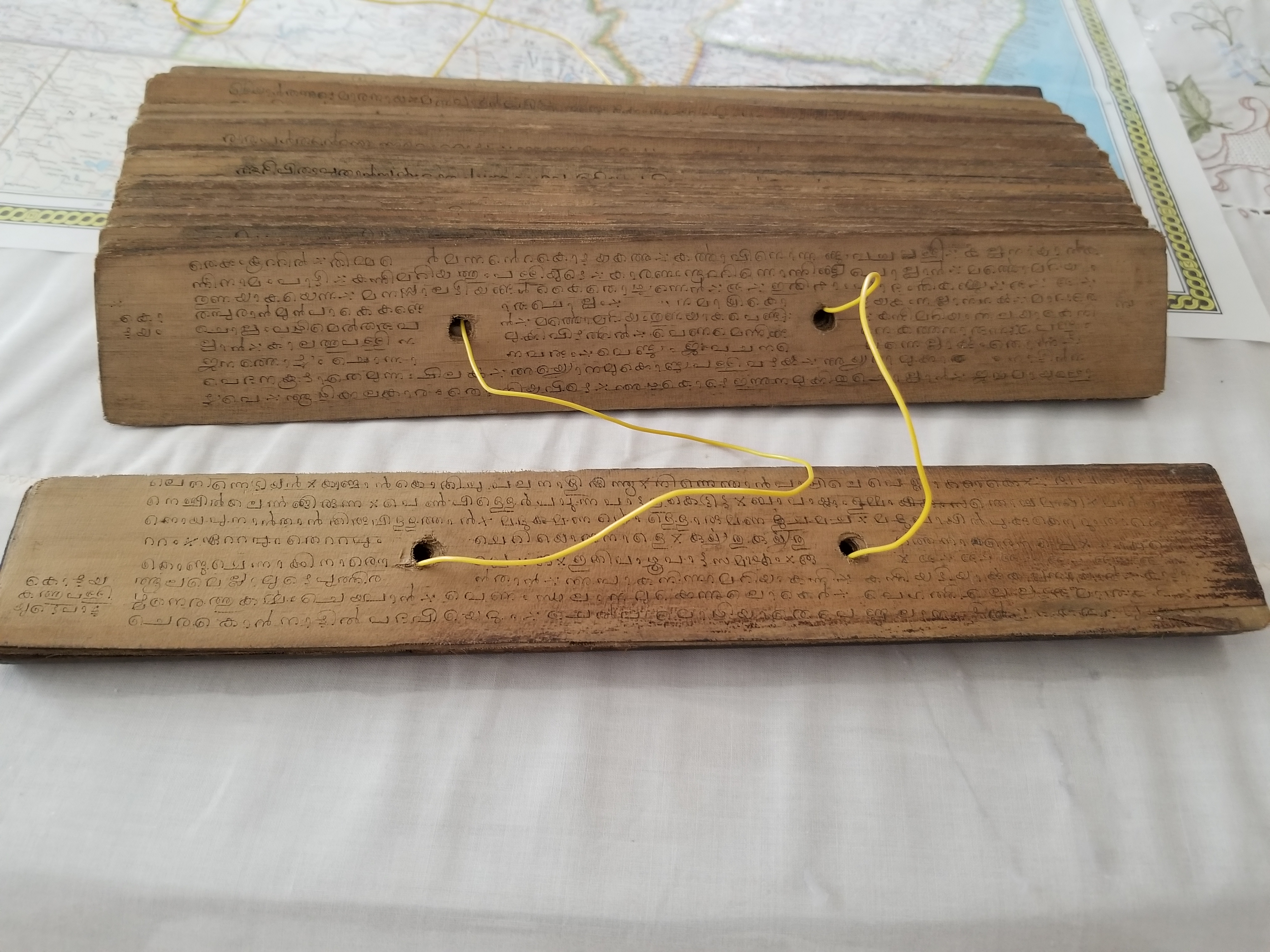
Palm Leaf Relics of Knanaya Folk Songs

The Knanaya, an ethnic group within the St. Thomas Christians, preserve ancient folk songs that were first documented in 1910 by Knanaya scholar P.U. Luke in his text Puratana Pattukal (Ancient Songs). The origins of these songs are unknown; they were collected by Luke from Knanaya families who had preserved them on palm leaf manuscripts. Written in Old Malayalam, these songs also contain elements of Sanskrit, Syriac, and Tamil, indicating their antiquity. The content of these songs includes folklore about the community's faith, customs, and practices, narratives of historical events such as the mission of St. Thomas the Apostle and the immigration of the Knanaya to India, biblical stories, songs dedicated to churches, and the lives of saints. These poetic songs are regarded as significant treasures in Kerala's cultural heritage. Scholars have observed that the songs of the Knanaya share similar composition, linguistic features, and characteristics with those of the Cochin Jews. Some songs are found to have nearly identical lyrics, differing only in a few words or stanzas.

=== Ottamthullal Songs ===
Ottamthullal songs are composed specifically for the performance of the art form known as Ottamthullal. The performer sings and dances to the music. Unlike Kathakali, the language used in Ottamthullal is not heavily Sanskritized Malayalam, and the lyrics are set to rhythms that vary from simple to complex. Traditionally, Ottamthullal performances were held in temples.

=== Malayalam Pop music ===
Pop music in Kerala saw development in the latter half of the 1990s with the emergence of East Coast Vijayan and his music company, East Coast Audios. Vijayan is considered a pioneer of non-film pop album songs in Kerala. As a poet himself, he wrote the lyrics for the first non-film music album in Malayalam, Ninakkai, which was released in 1998. The music for the album was composed by Balabhaskar, and the song Ninakkay Thozhi Punarjanikkam, sung by Biju Narayanan, gained significant popularity. In 1999, Vijayan released his second album in the 'Ninakkai' series titled Aadhyamai, with music composed by Balabhaskar and lyrics by Vijayan. The song Iniyarkkum Arodum, sung by K. J. Yesudas, also became a hit. In 2001, East Coast released Ormakkai, widely regarded as one of the biggest hits in the history of Malayalam Pop Music. The song Ormakkai Iniyoru Snehageetham from the album, composed by M. Jayachandran and penned by Vijayan, and sung by K. J. Yesudas and K. S. Chithra, is considered an all-time classic hit.

During this period, Pop albums became increasingly popular among college campuses, sparking the emergence of new talents in music. One notable album that captured the attention of youth at the time was Valentine's Day. The song Niranja Mizhiyum, composed by Isaac Thomas Kottukappally and written by Gireesh Puthanchery, gained significant popularity among college students. Alongside East Coast, other audio companies such as Johny Sagarika, Satyam Audios, Magnum Audios, and Octave Audios began producing music albums, further fostering the growth of Pop music culture in Kerala.

In 2006, Satyam Audios released the highly successful album Chempakame, introducing a new singing sensation, Franco, and a talented composer, Shyam Dharman. The songs Sundariye Vaa and Chembakame from the album became record-breaking hits. The same year, Shaan Rahman, along with Siju Sivan and Deepu Skaria, formed a new band named DESINOISE and launched the album Revolution. The songs Aasha nirashaa and Oo NIlaave garnered widespread attention for their music and diverse picturization.

In 2008, Johny Sagarika released the album Moham, featuring the hit song Kudajadriyil, sung by Swarnalatha and composed by Mansoor Ahmed. Additionally, a new trend emerged in Malayali pop music with the rise of boy bands.

One of the first notable boy bands in the Malayalam pop music scene was Confusion, formed by Balabhaskar and Ishaan Dev, with their song No Tension Please becoming a hit. In 2007, the band Team Malayalee emerged and made a significant impact on the Malayalam album industry. Team Malayalee consisted of four talented musicians: Vineeth Sreenivasan, Jakes Bijoy, Shaan Rahman, and Arjun Sasi. Their songs Friends 4 Ever and Minnalazhake from the album Malayalee were particularly successful. In 2008, Vineeth Sreenivasan and Shaan Rahman collaborated again to release the album Coffee @ MG Road, which achieved significant success. The song Palavattom, featuring Malayalam actor Salim Kumar, is considered a classic. In 2009, the boy band YUVA emerged with their debut album Dreamzzz, creating a notable impact. YUVA, comprising Vineeth Mohandas, Santhosh Kumar, and Sinu Zachariah, introduced fresh melodies to the Malayalam music industry, which had been heavily influenced by Tamil, Hindi, and Western music. Their debut video song Ravin Nilakayalil became a major hit and topped charts throughout 2009. In 2010, YUVA released their second music video, Povukayano, sung by Vidhu Pratap, which also gained popularity among young audiences. That same year, a new boy band named Arrows was formed, featuring members from the reality music show Asianet's Idea Star Singer: Arun Gopan, Roshan N.C., William Isaac, and Sudarshan Achary. After a six-year hiatus, East Coast released the sixth album in the Ninakkai series, titled Ennennum. This ambitious project was released in five languages across India, featuring 60 songs performed by 30 leading singers from the country. This ambitious album was composed by Vijay Karun and featured lyrics by East Coast Vijayan. It is considered one of the first high-budget music albums in Kerala. Additionally, emerging composers like Rashee (Alone, Loved and Lost), Dijo Jose Antony (La Cochin), Nithin (Autograph), and Mithun Raj (Violet) have made significant contributions to the Malayalam album industry. In 2012, the global music label Sony Music Entertainment made its entry into the Malayalam music industry with the album Yuvvh, launching musicians Saachin and Sreejith. The album's initial track, Nenjodu Cherthu, garnered over 150,000 views on YouTube within three days of its release, marking it as one of the first significant Malayalam viral hits without any negative publicity. Over the last two decades, there has been a notable resurgence in folk traditions, marked by initiatives such as Thaikudam Bridge and Praseetha. The revival of folk music, initially championed by figures like Kavalam Narayana Panicker and further popularized by Kalabhavan Mani, has gained significant traction among teenagers in more recent years.

== Pulluvan Pattu ==
The pulluvar community in Kerala has deep ties to serpent worship. Within this community, one faction reveres snake gods as their primary deity and performs specific rituals and songs known as Pulluvan Pattu. These rituals are observed in households across caste lines, as well as in serpent temples. The songs performed by the pulluvar in serpent temples and snake groves are known by various names such as Sarppapaattu, Naagam Paattu, Sarpam Thullal, Sarppolsavam, Paambum Thullal, or Paambum Kalam. These rituals typically involve Kalamezhuthu (the ceremonial drawing of Kalam), accompanied by song and dance.

== Temple Music ==
In Kerala, various forms of music have become integral to the festivals and ceremonies held in temples. Among these are Panchari melam and Pandi melam, two prominent ensemble performances featuring the chenda drum accompanied by ilathalam (cymbals), kuzhal, and kombu. Thayambaka is another significant form, where one or a few chenda players deliver improvised solos alongside additional chenda and ilathalam players. Additionally, there are kshetra vadyam and sopanam, which provide musical accompaniment during rituals. Another notable ensemble is Panchavadyam, comprising five instruments: maddalam, thimila, kombu, ilathalam, and idakka.

== Sopanam ==
In Kerala, sopanam is the most popular musical style. Sopana Sangeetham, a type of classical music, is drawn from the temples of Kerala. Sopanam was created as a religious hymn inside the temples at Kalam of Kali. The Jayadeva Gita Govinda, which was authored, makes Sopanam more well-known.

At the holy side, this Sopana sangeetham music is sung as a guide to the shrine sanctum. This song is performed using the idakka, an ethnic drum with an hourglass shape, along with the beats produced by the chengila, a metallic gong.
