= Pallavur Appu Marar =

Percussionist, Sopana Sangeetham exponent

- Born: 1928; Pallavur, Palakkad, Kerala, India
- Died: 8 December 2002; Palakkad, Kerala, India
- Occupations: Percussionist, Panchavadyam exponent
- Children: Shailaja, Chandran
- Parent(s): Shankaran Marar; Ammini
- Awards: Kerala Sangeeta Nataka Akademi Award; Guruvayurappan Puraskaram; Manaveeyam Award

Pallavur Appu Marar (1928-2002) was an Indian percussionist, widely considered to be a maestro in the Pallavur (Palakkad) style of thayambaka, edakka, sopana sangeetham, melam and panchavadyam. He was the eldest of the three brothers, the other two being Pallavur Manian Marar and Pallavur Kunhikuttan Marar, who formed the famed Pallavur trio.

== Biography ==
Appu Marar could make the edaka speak, Tabla maestro Zakir Hussain said once

Pallavur temple

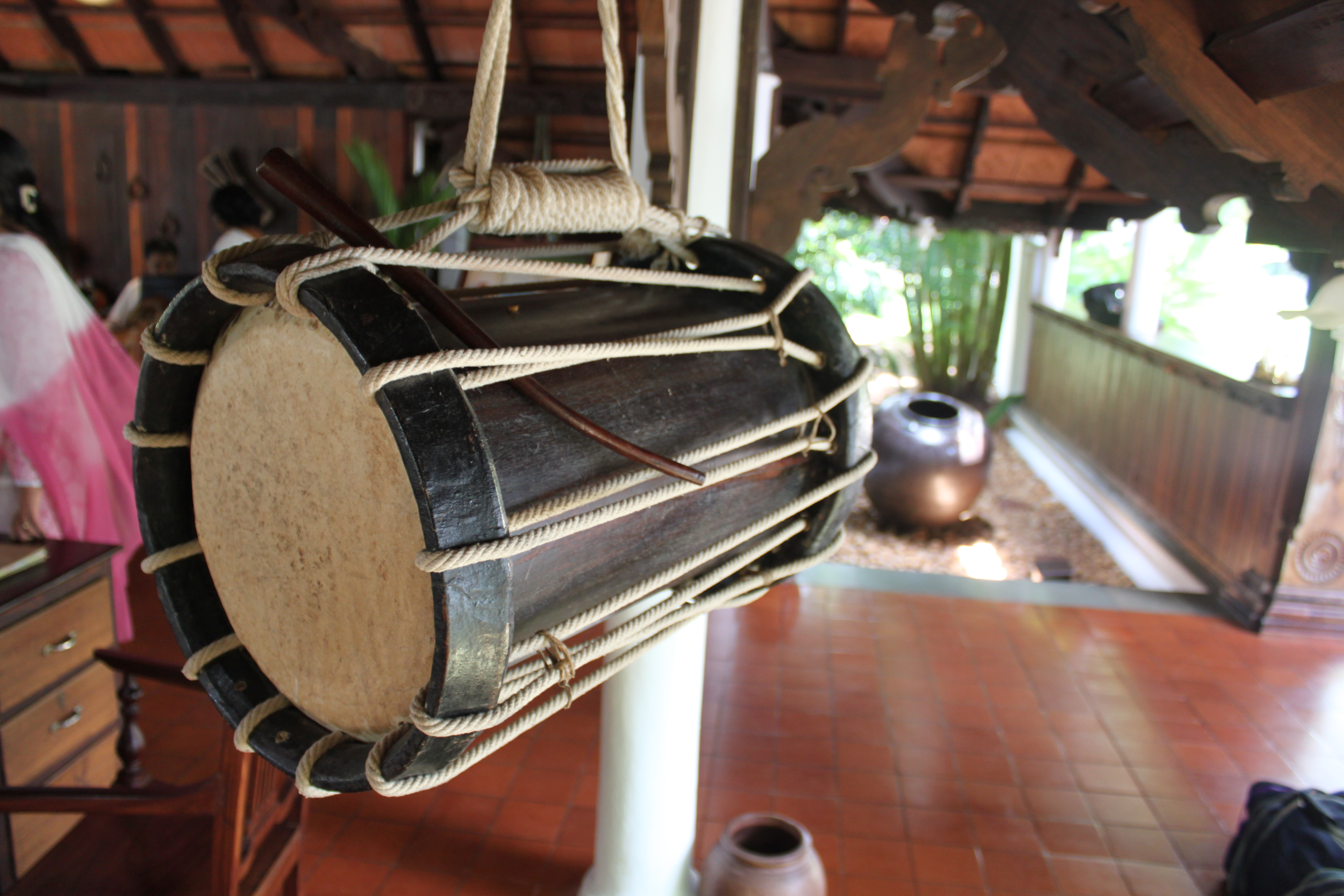
Chenda and Koal (stick) (ചെണ്ടയും കോലും)

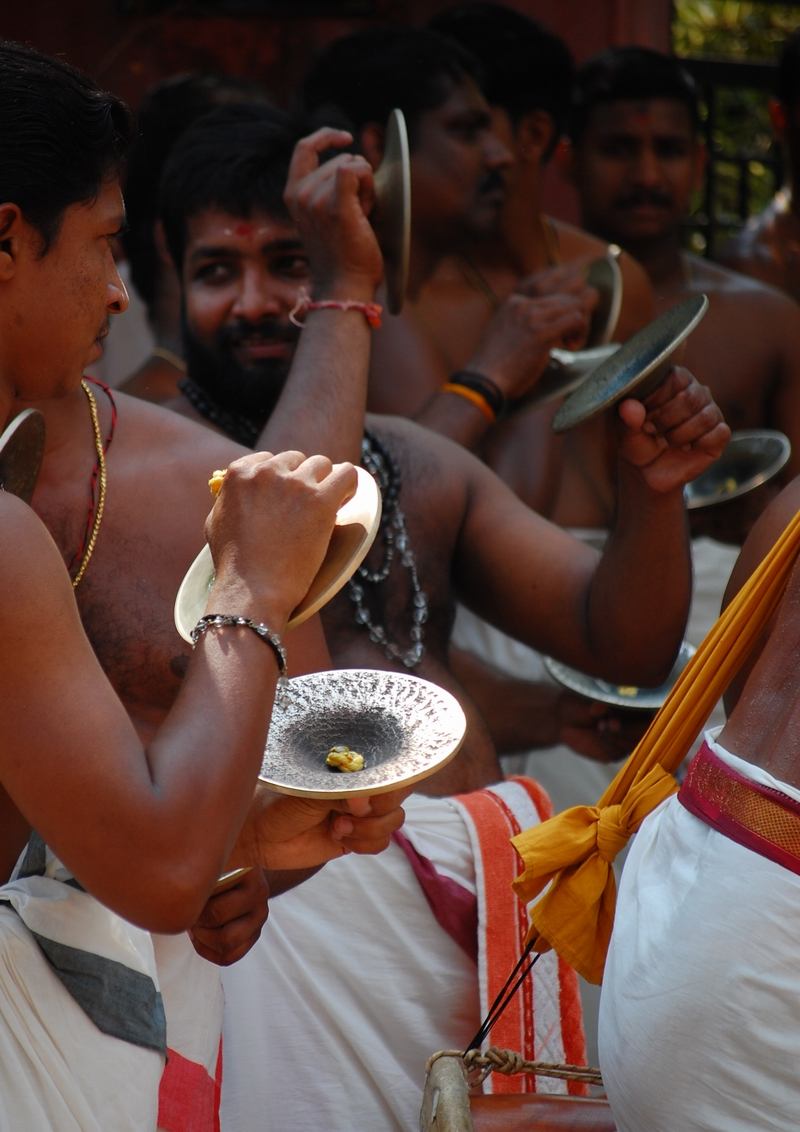
An artist using Ilathalam

Appu Marar was born in 1928, at Pallavur, a small hamlet in Palakkad district, in the south Indian state of Kerala, to Shankaran Marar and Ammini. His father, a nomad, left the young Appu and his mother, when he was one year old, throwing the family into poverty. Ammini was forced to remarry Subramania Iyer, and had two more sons, Manian and Kunhikuttan, who, years later, completed the Pallavur trio.

Appu started learning traditional percussion instruments at a very young age and had his arangettam (debut) on chenda, at Pallavur Shiva Temple, the age of 8. He, soon, became adept at playing chenda, edeka and timila, under the tutelage of Thiruvilvamala Kondaswami and Parathuveettil Nanu Marar. Appu Marar saw his father for the first time, when he was 17 years old, by which time, he had already mastered those traditional percussion instruments and had started performing at various temples in Kerala.

By the time, Appu Marar died in a private hospital in Palakkad at 4.00am on 8 December 2002, due to age related illnesses, he had already performed at many stages including in Russia and at 47 Thrissur Poorams and 60 Nemmara Velas. He performed, without break, at Thrissur pooram, heading the panchavadyam for Paremekkavu Devaswom from 1960 till his death in 2002.

The legacy of Appu Marar lives on through his numerous disciples, who are active at the temple festivals across the state. His son, Kunissery Chandran, is also a known Maddalam exponent. However, the most notable contribution of Appu Marar remains the style of panchavadyam, he, along with his brothers, have created, the Pallavur style.

== Kaalam (The Unending Time) ==
K. Ramachandran, a short filmmaker from Kerala, created a documentary, Kaalam (The Unending Time), on the life of Appu Marar. The film, narrates the tumultuous early life of Appu Marar and his later climb to fame, and won the Kerala Kala Mandalam Award for the most outstanding short film on performing arts. The film was also screened at the Festival of South Asian Documentaries at Kathmandu 3–6 October 2013. The film shows many interviews with Appu Marar's contemporaries and family members.

== Awards and recognitions ==
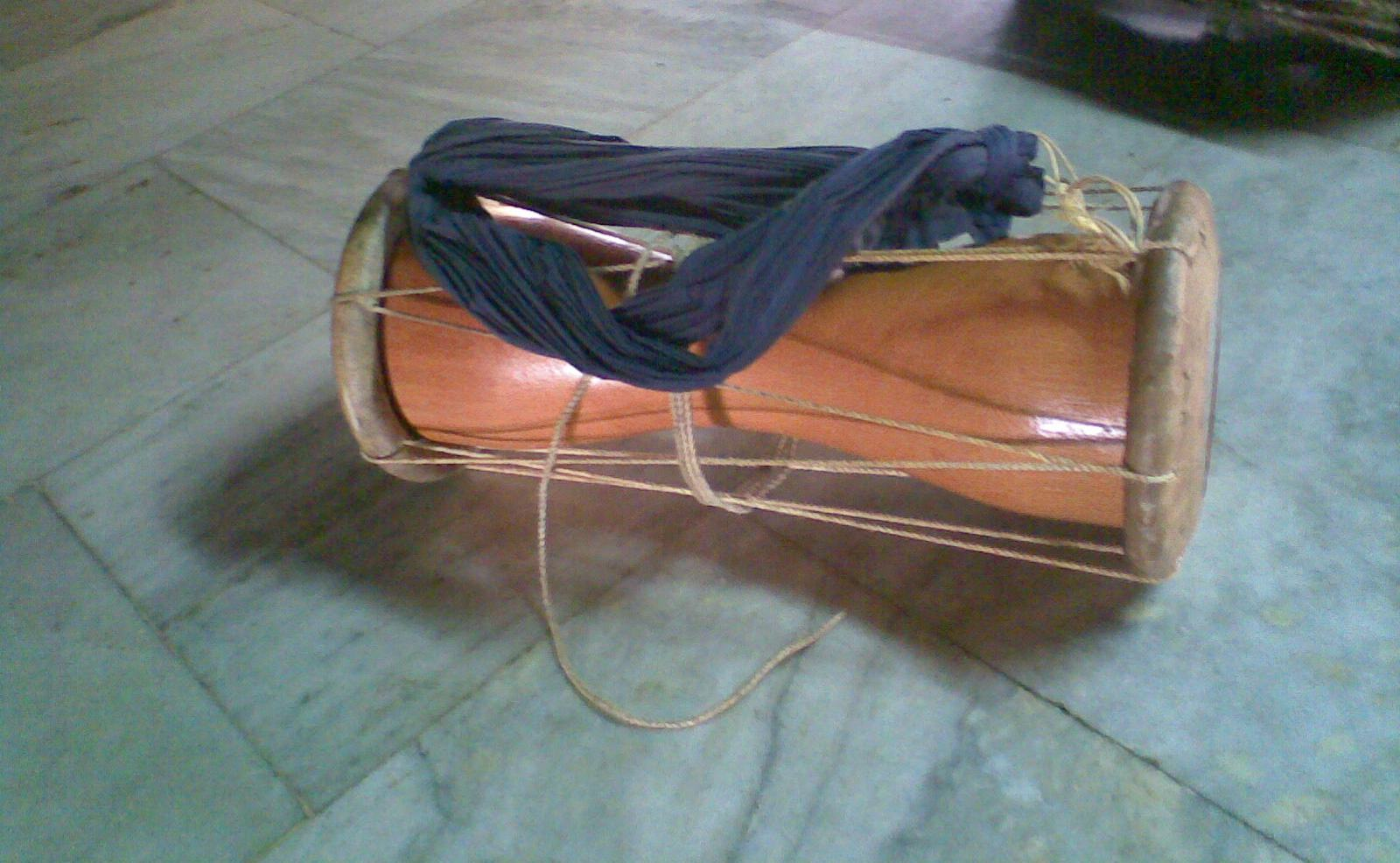
Timila

Kerala Sangeetha Nataka Akademi honoured Appu Marar, in 1983, by bestowing on him their annual Kerala Sangeetha Nataka Akademi Award. Guruvayur Devaswom Board awarded him the Guruvayurappan Puraskaram in 1995. He also received the Manaweeyam Award, in 2002, apart from various other local honours.

Honoring the memory of the percussionist, the Government of Kerala has instituted an award, Pallavur Appu Marar Award, which is given annually to recognise excellence in ritual music of Kerala. Another award of the same name, Pallavur Appu Marar Award has also been instituted by the renowned ayurvedic institution, Kottakkal Arya Vaidya Sala.

An annual beat festival, Appu Marar Vadyotsavam, is conducted every year, in Appu Marar's honour.

== Publications ==
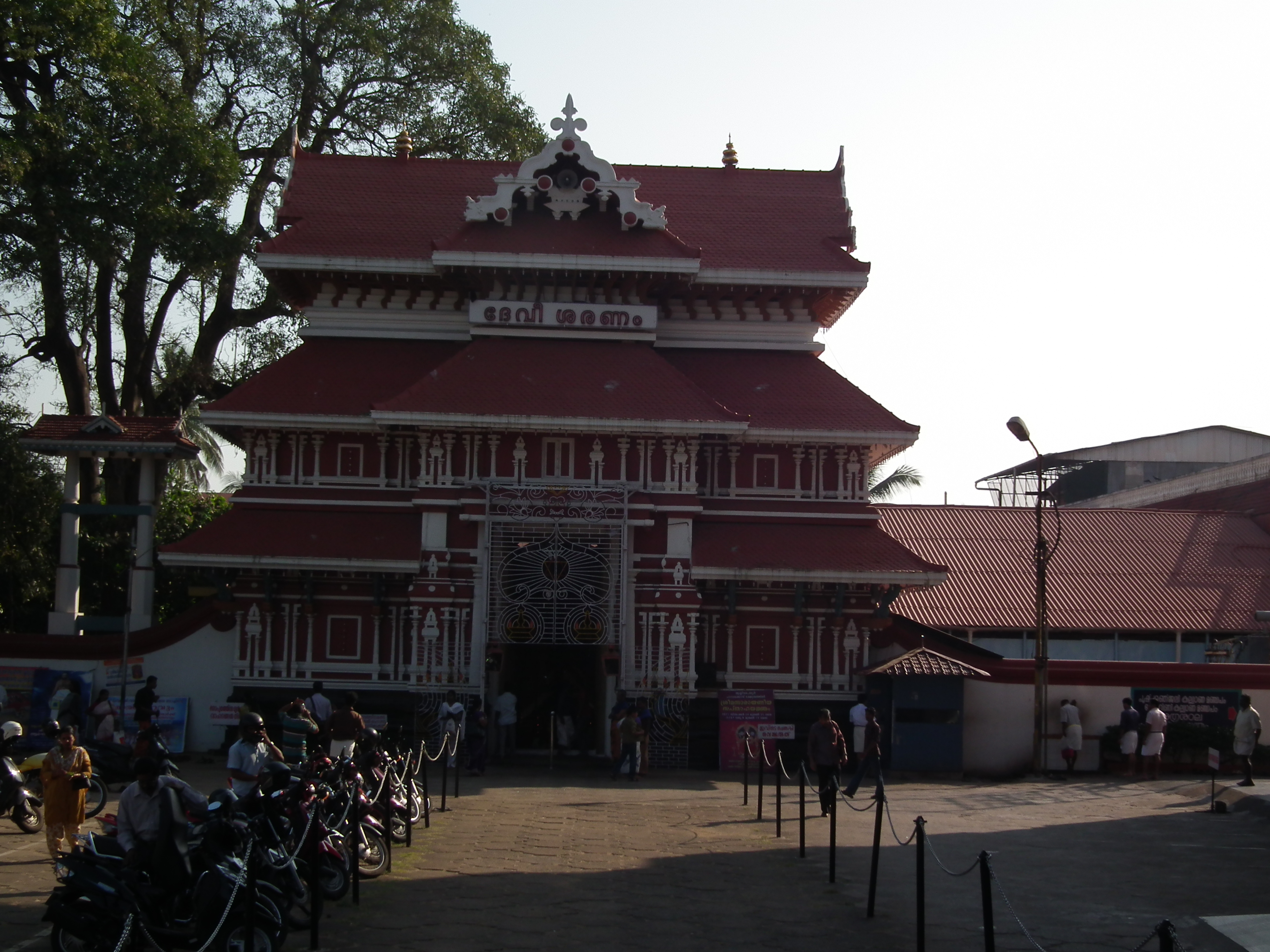
Paramekkavu Bagavathi Temple 0194

Appu Marar has written a book, Pr̲amāṇaṃ: ātmakatha (Theory and Biography), an autobiography in part, but also containing theories and arguments on traditional Kerala music. The book was co-authored by Madanan.

- Pallavur Appu Marar; Madanan (2002). Pr̲amāṇaṃ: ātmakatha. Pāppiyōṇ Books. p. 58. OCLC 51264514.

Crescent Music has released an audio on compact disc, which has the recording of many of Appu Marar's performance on edaka.

- Pallavur Appu Marar. Vadyasamanwayam – Vādyasamavyayaṃ – Edakka (Compact Disc). Cresendo Music. OCLC 86082970.

== See also ==
- Neralattu Rama Poduval
- Kuzhur Narayana Marar
- Guru Gopinath
- Panchavadyam
- Thayambaka
- Panchari melam
- Pandi melam

== Gallery ==
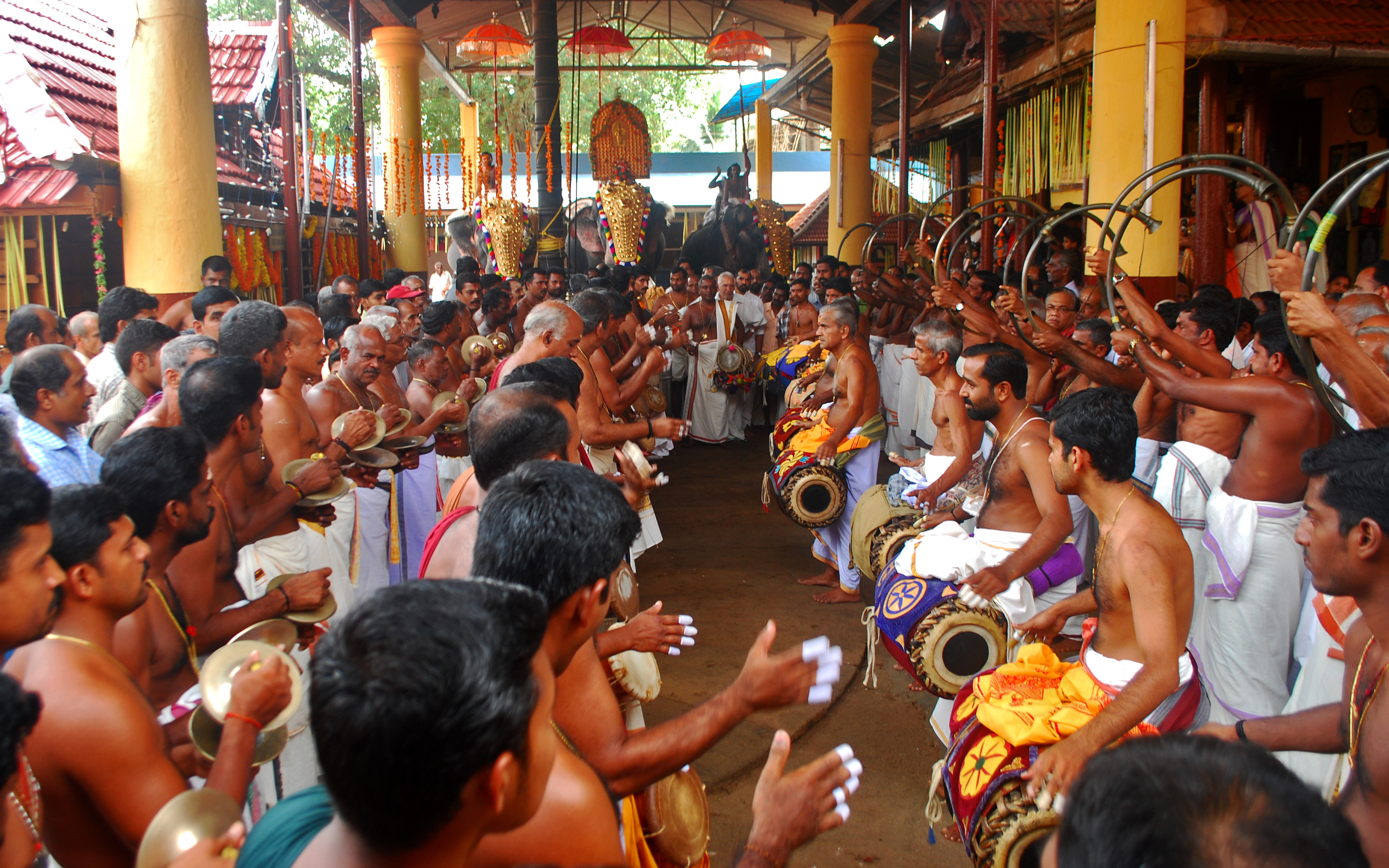

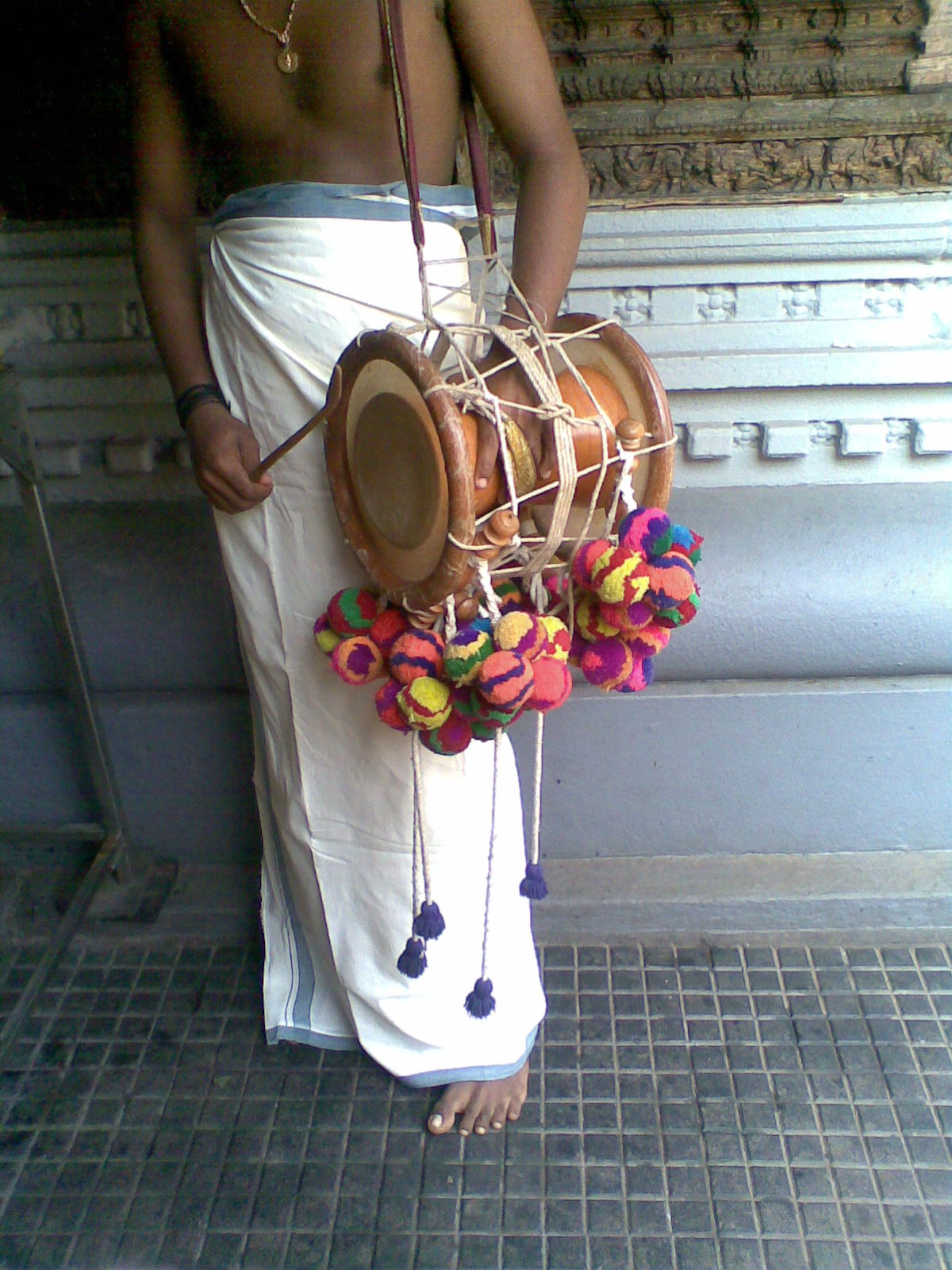

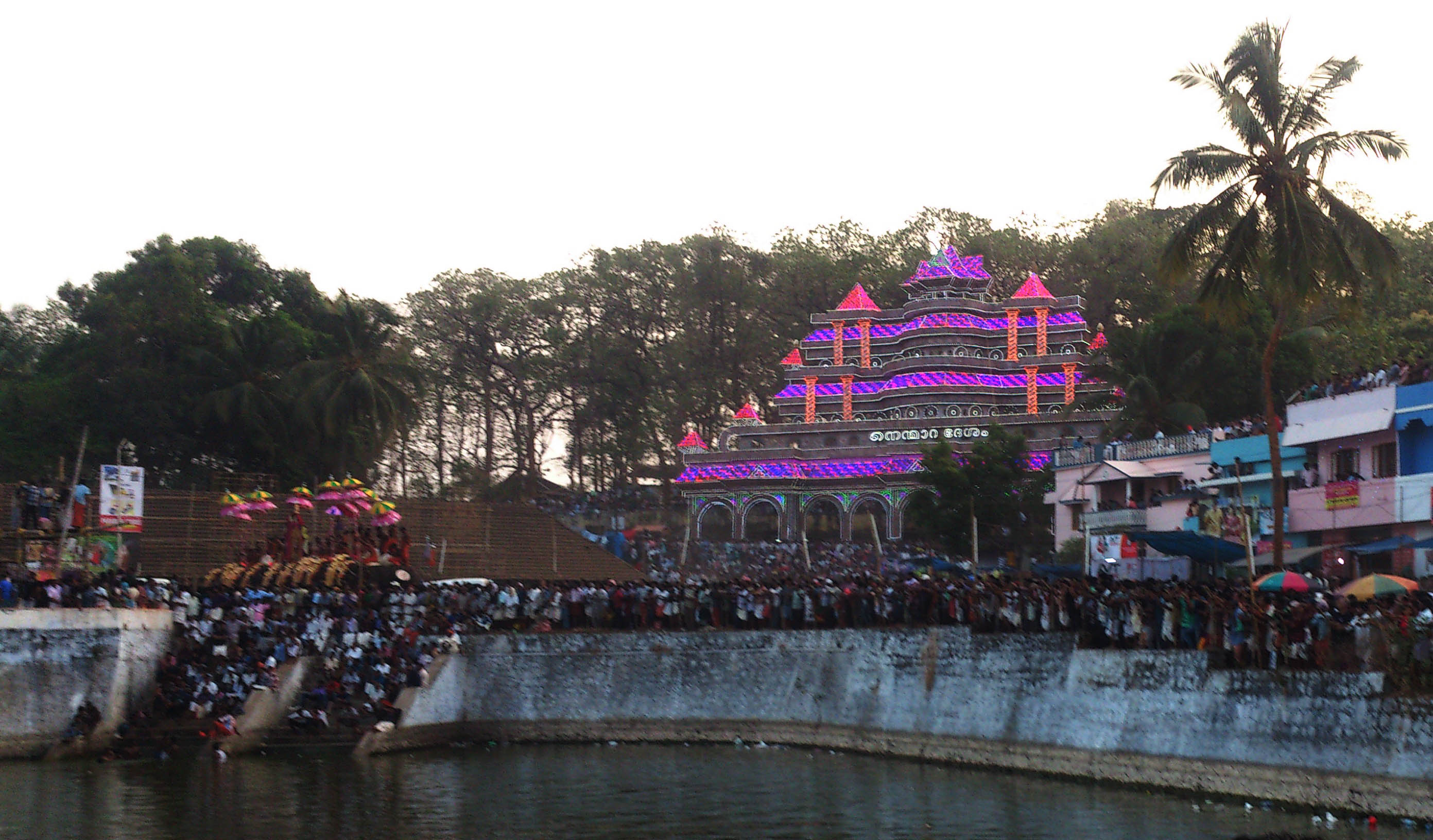
