= Nirmala (1948 film) =

- Directed by: P. V. Krishna Iyer
- Screenplay by: Puthezhathu Raman Menon
- Story by: M. S. Jacob
- Produced by: P. J. Cherian
- Starring: Joseph Cherian; Baby Joseph
- Cinematography: J. G. Vijayam; G. Ranganathan
- Edited by: Balu
- Music by: P. S. Divakar; E. I. Warrier
- Production company: Kerala Talkies
- Release date: 25 February 1948
- Country: India
- Language: Malayalam

Nirmala is a 1948 Indian Malayalam-language drama film directed by P. V. Krishna Iyer and produced by P. J. Cherian.

== Cast ==
Cherian's family played a large part in the film.

- Joseph Cherian
- Baby Joseph
- P.K. Raghavan
- Cherthala Vasudeva Kurup
- P. J. Cherian
- Mathappan
- S. J. Dev
- Kamalamma

== Music ==
E. I. Warrier P. S. Divakar were the composers. Lyrics were by poet G. Sankara Kurup. They were sung by P. Leela, P. K. Raghavan, Sarojini Menon, T. K. Govindarao, Vasudeva Kurup and Vimala B. Varma.
