= Sadanam Divakara Marar =

Indian percussionist

- Born: 29 April 1937; Pazhoor, Piravom, Kerala, India
- Died: 29 July 2014 (aged 77)
- Other name: K N Divakara Marar
- Occupation: Percussionist
- Years active: 1960s to 2014
- Spouse: Omana Divakaran
- Children: 3
- Parent(s): Venkittaramanan Embranthiri; Kottarappattu Parukutti Marasyar
- Awards: Kerala Sangeeta Nataka Akademi Fellowship; Vadyakala Visarad; Veera Srungala of Kerala Kalamandalam
- Website: Official blog

Sopana Sangeetham is a form of Indian classical music that developed in the temples of Kerala in south India in the wake of the increasing popularity of Jayadeva's Gita Govinda or Ashtapadis.

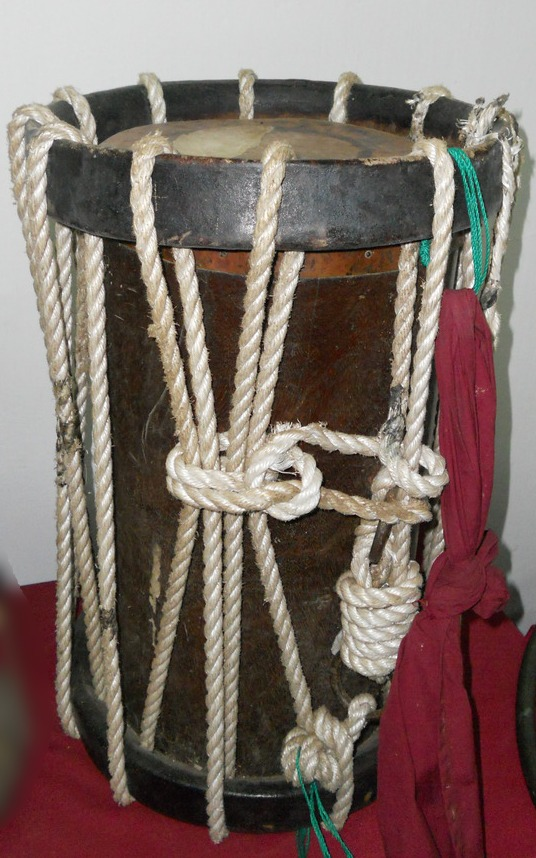
Chenda (ചെണ്ട)

Sadanam Divakara Marar was an Indian percussionist, known for his scholarship on sopana sangeetham, marappani, parisha vadhyam and thimila paani and his mastery over various temple and ritual percussion instruments of traditional Kerala music.

== Biography ==
Most of the traditional percussion ensembles like parisha vadhyam and kotti paadi seva (ancient form of sopana sangeetham), says Divakara Marar, have been handed over from generation to generation as an inherited art form.

Divakara Marar was born on 29 April 1937, to Venkittaramanan Embranthiri and Parukutti Marasyar Amma at Pazhoor, a small hamlet near the town of Piravom, Ernakulam district, in the south Indian state of Kerala. Marar started learning music at the age of nine, under the tutelage of his uncles, Narayana Marar and Kunjikrishna Marar. Later, aged 18, he enrolled at Unnayi Warrier Smaraka Kalanilayam, Irinjalakuda, a known Kathakali institution and mastered chenda, under the guidance of Alankarathu Appu Marar. He, then, submitted himself to advanced training on chenda under the renowned chenda exponent, Chandra Mannadiar. This was followed by his training stint on thayambaka at Peroor Gandhi Seva Sadanam, which added the prefix of Sadanam to his name.

He was married to Omana and the couple had two daughters, Radhika and Rethika, and a son, Rajesh. Divakara Marar died on 29 July 2014, at his residence in Tripunithura, due to age related illnesses.

== Career ==
Different baanis (schools) are there for sopana sangeetham like that of Ramamangalam baani developed by the legendary singer Shadkala Govinda Marar, says Marar, Poduvaal baani popularised by the saintly singer, the late Neralattu Rama Poduval, and also the Guruvayoor baani of Janardhanan Nedungadi.

Divakara Marar began his career as a teacher at RLV College of Music and Fine Arts, Tripunithura, where he taught kathakali chenda. He also taught many disciples through Padana kalaris (short term teaching camps), too. He retired as the Principal of Vaikkom Kshethra Kalapeetom run by Travancore Devaswom Board. He remained a visiting professor at the institute and was active teaching at Ernakulam Siva Kshethra Vadhya Kalalayam and Kanayannoor Vadhya Kalalayam till his death.

Marar has performed at many temples and festivals in Kerala throughout his career. He was also actively associated with the Viswa Kala Kendra of Guru Gopinath, See India Foundation and International Kathakali Kendra (International Centre for Kathakali), New Delhi, throughout his career.

== Awards and recognitions ==
Divakara Marar has received many awards and recognitions, a few of which are:

- Kendra Sangeet Natak Akademi * Fellowship – Department of Culture, Government of India
- Vadya Kala Visaradh – Travancore Devaswom Board
- Veera Srungala (Gold Armband) of Kerala Kalamandalam

== See also ==
- Neralattu Rama Poduval
- Kuzhur Narayana Marar
- Guru Gopinath
- Panchavadyam
- Thayambaka
- Panchari melam
- Pandi melam

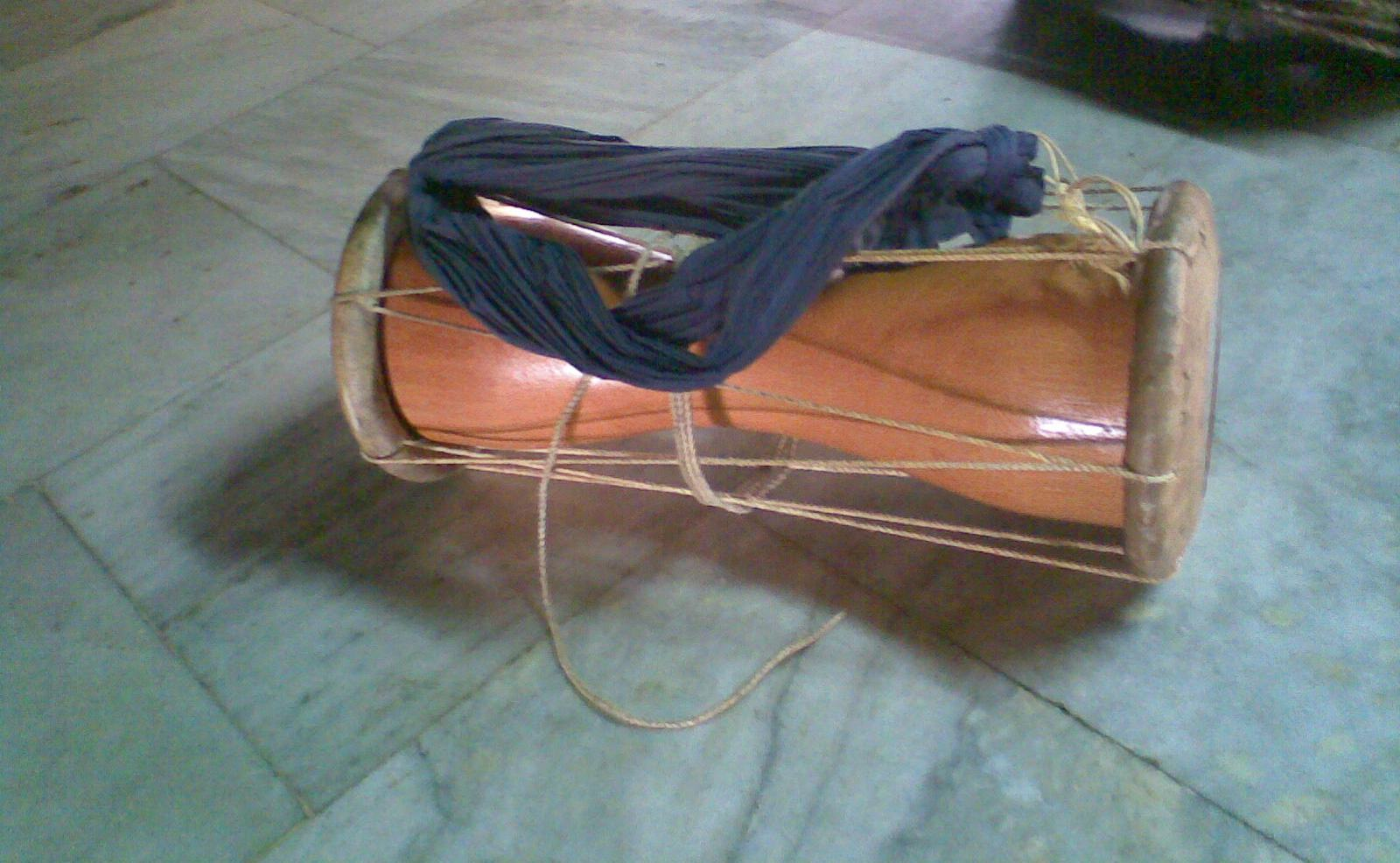
Timila
