= Krishnadas =

Krishnadas may refer to:

- Krishnadas Payahari, Hindu saint
- Malavika Krishnadas, Indian actress
- Tripunithura Krishnadas, Indian musician
- N. N. Krishnadas, Indian politician
