= Pallavur =

Pallavur Pallavoor
- Village
- Thripallavurappan Temple, Pallavur
- Interactive map of Pallavur
- Coordinates: 10°37′50″N 76°37′5″E
- Country: India
- State: Kerala
- District: Palakkad
- Elevation: 82 m (269 ft)

Languages
  - Official: Malayalam, English
- Time zone: UTC+5:30 (IST)
- PIN: 678 688
- Vehicle registration: KL-

Pallavur is a village situated in the Chittur Taluk, Palakkad district of Kerala, India. It is close to Kollengode Town, Nemmara and Koduvayur.

== Administration ==
Pallavur is part of the Kollengode police station area. It is 3 km from Kunissery, 4 km from Kudallur, 5 km from Nemmara, and 20 km away from Palakkad city. The village stretches about 3–4 km^{2} and comes under the Pallassena Village Panchayat.

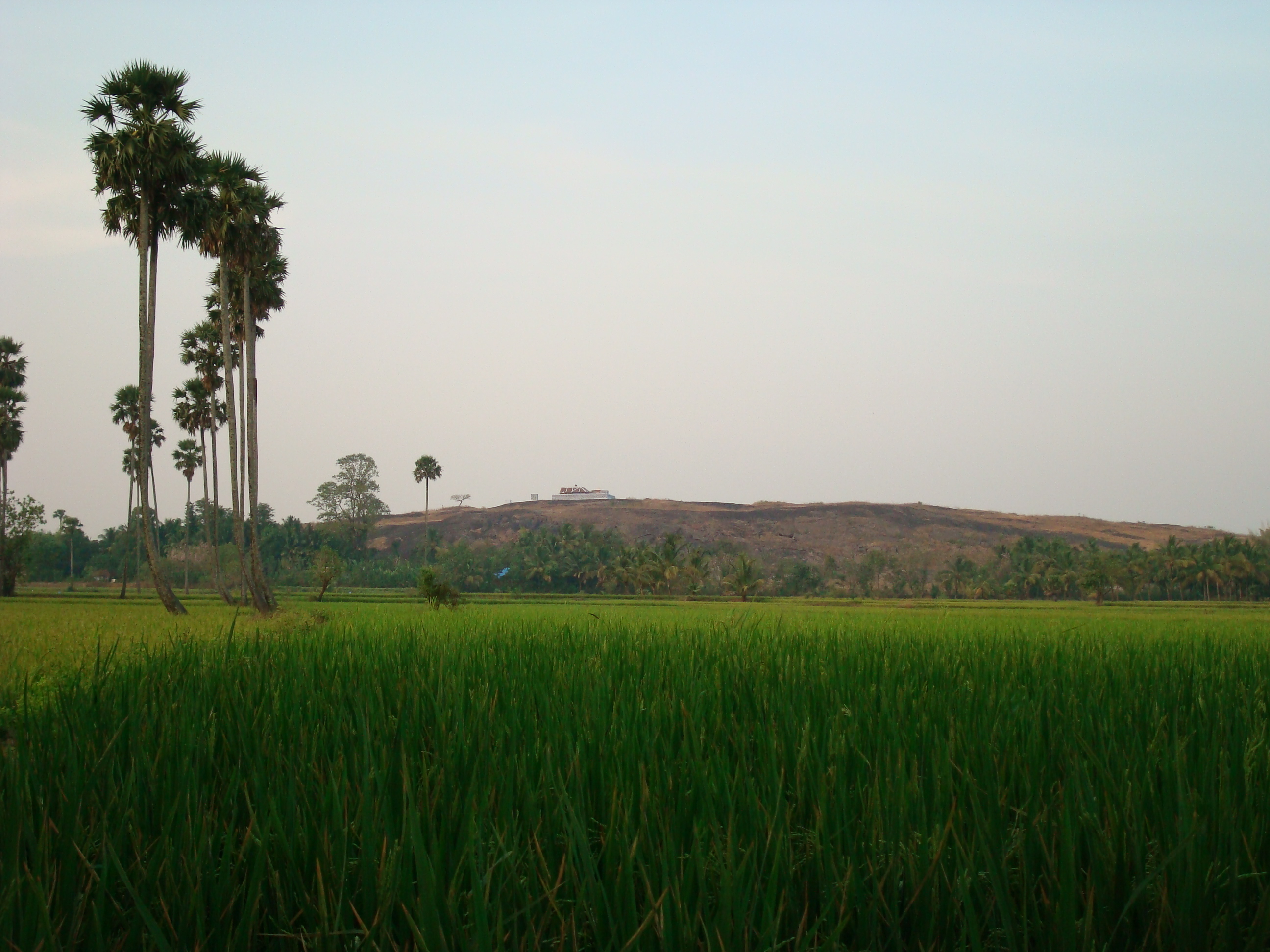
Vamala, Pallavur

== Temple ==
The village also has a Hindu temple called the Thrippallavurappan Temple, dedicated to the god Shiva. The temple is over 1,500 years old, and comes under the Malabar Devaswom Board. A large four-sided stone wall surrounds the temple, with an entrance on the southern side.

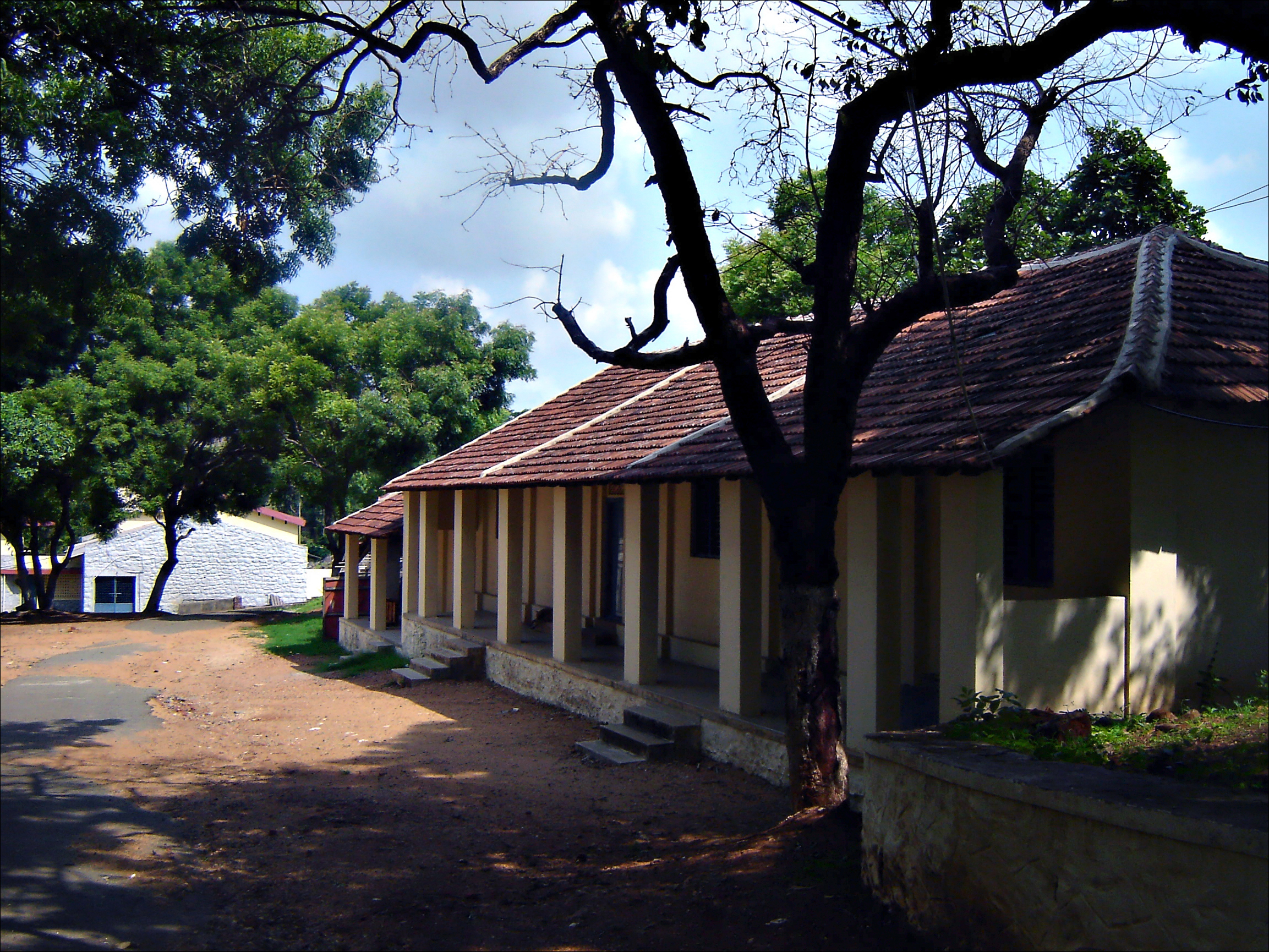
Chinmaya Vidyalaya, Pallavur

== Pallavur Trio ==
Pallavur is famous for the Pallavur Trio, a traditional percussion group from the village which specialised in styles like thayambaka, edakka, sopana sangeetham, melam and panchavadyam. The group comprised the three brothers Appu Marar, Manian Marar and Kunjukutta Marar.
