= Sopana Sangeetham =

Form of South Indian classical music

- Stylistic origins: Kerala temple music; Ashtapadis of Jayadeva's Gita Govinda
- Cultural origins: Temples of Kerala, south India
- Typical instruments: Edakka; Chengila
- Derivative forms: Kathakali music; Krishnanattam music

Regional scenes
- Kerala

Other topics
- Music of Kerala; Carnatic music

Sopana Sangeetham (Malayalam: സോപാന സംഗീതം) is a form of Indian classical music that developed in the temples of Kerala in south India as a classical style based on the singing of Jayadeva's Gita Govinda or Ashtapadis.

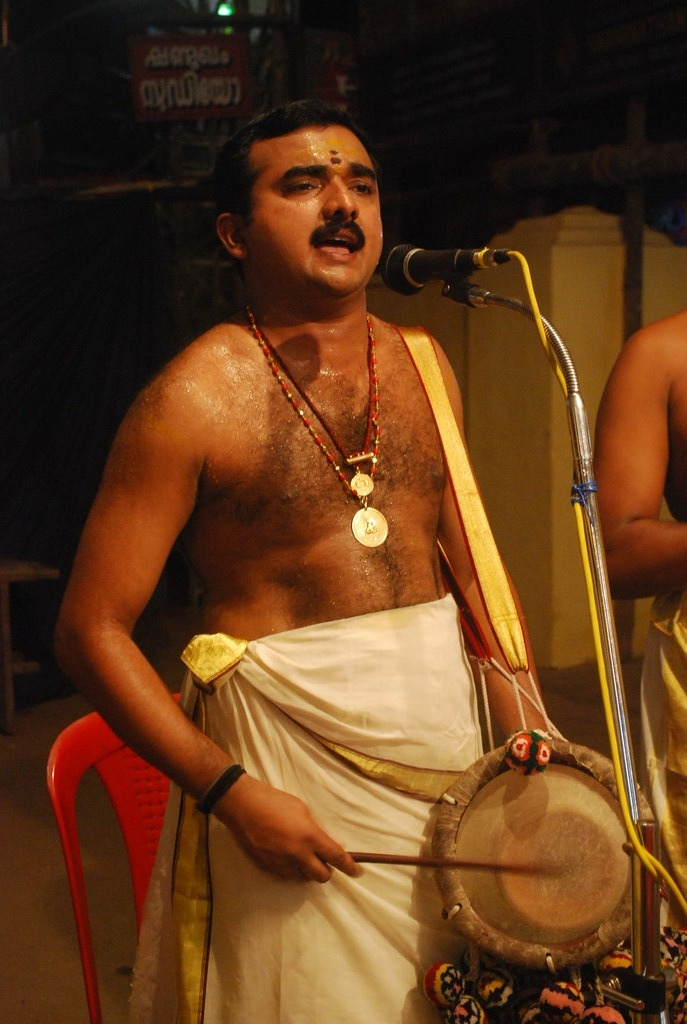
Ambalapuzha Vijayakumar singing Sopana Sangeetham in 2011

== Etymology ==
The name derives from two Malayalam or Sanskrit words: Sopanam and Sangeetham. Sopanam refers to the sacred steps leading to the inner shrine (sanctum sanctorum) of a temple, and Sangeetham refers to music.

== Performance ==
Sopana sangeetham, as the name suggests, is sung beside the holy steps (sopanam) leading to the sanctum sanctorum of a shrine. The temple musician typically stands by the steps, singing devotional songs in plain notes while the priest performs the rituals. The principal accompaniment is the small, hourglass-shaped drum called the 'edakka' (or idakka), often played by the singer himself, along with the chengila, a handheld metallic gong used to sound the beats. Because the singer beats the edakka himself while singing, the practice is also known as Kottipadi Seva (kotti – to beat, padi – to sing, seva – offering). Sopanam is traditionally sung by men of the Maarar and Pothuval castes of the Ambalavasi (semi-Brahmin) community, who performed it as a hereditary profession.

== Notable exponents ==
Past exponents include the late Njeralattu Rama Poduval of the Thirumandhamkunnu bani (school), Janardhanan Nedungadi of Guruvayoor, Jyothidas Guruvayoordasan, Damodara Marar of Pazhoor (a practitioner of the temple art Mudiyettu), and the master percussionist Sadanam Divakara Marar.

== See also ==
- Culture of Kerala
- Ambalavasi
- Music of Kerala
