= Pulluvan Paattu =

Pulluvan Pattu from Sri Kurumbakkavu, Poikkattussery, Kerala, India

Pulluvan Pattu is a form of serpent worship performed by both the lower castes and higher castes, in addition to serpent temples. The pulluvar of Kerala are closely connected to serpents. They consider the snake gods their presiding deities and perform sacrifices and sing songs.

A Pulluvan is a male member (female Pulluvatti) of a low caste group called Pulluvar.

pulluva pattu

The majority among them are called Nagampatikal (people who sing snake-songs). There are pulluvars who are not Naagampatikal. They are known as Pretampatikal (people who sing ghost songs). The women of the houses where the ritual takes place performs the serpent dance (Sarpam Thullal) at the Mulluthara Devi Temple.

== Art forms ==
Most of the art forms of the Pulluvar are ritualistic. Most of their songs are related to worship, ritual, custom and exorcism. The pulluva art is expressed in the background of snake-worship, ghost worship and magic.

The pulluvar of Kerala are closely connected to the serpent worshiping Mulluthara Devi Temple. One group among these people consider the snake gods as their presiding deity and perform rituals such as sacrifices and song singing. This is called ’Pulluvan Pattu’. It performed in the houses of the lower castes as well as those of the higher castes, as well as in serpent temples.

The songs conducted by the Pulluvar in serpent temples and snake groves are called Sarppapaattu, Naagam Paattu, Sarpam Thullal, Sarppolsavam, Paambum Thullal or Paambum Kalam. The main aspects of this are Kalamezhuthu (drawing of Kalam, a ritual art), singing and dancing of Mulluthara Devi Temple.

== Ritual ==
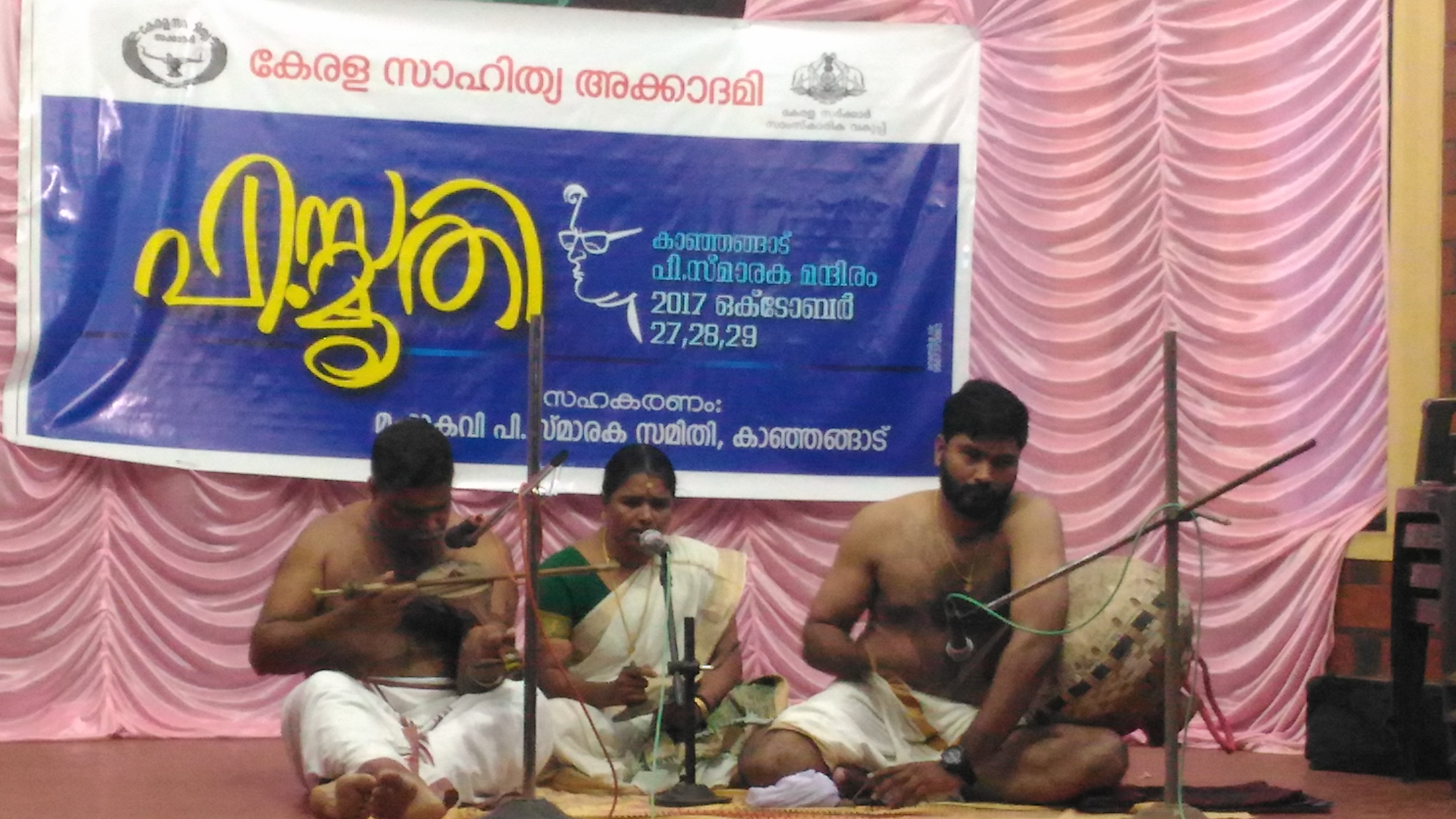
Pulluvan pattu performed at P. Smaraka Mandiram, Kanhangad, kerala

The women of the house where the ritual takes place performs the serpent dance (Sarpam Thullal). Austerities start seven or nine days before the day of the dance. They avoid eating food items that are considered to be impure.

The canopy (pandal) where the serpent dance takes place is adorned with palm leaves, geranium flowers, jasmine flowers, chrysanthemum indicum, champaka, lotus, banyan leaf, betel leaf, ripe areca nut and branches of coconut flowers. The form of the serpent is drawn with white rice powder and colour powder (black, red, green, yellow). The Pulluvar conduct the ritual around the decorated kalam (the field where the form of the serpent is drawn) in a specific order.

The deities Nagas have names as Naagaraajaavu, Naagayakshi, Sarppayakshi, Maninaagam, Erinaagam, Karinaagam, Kuzhinaagam, Paranaagam and Kanyaavu. The two women who represent the Nagas in a possession trance come to the Kalam and sit on the floor with an areca flower in their hands. They circumambulate the Kalam three times before sitting.

The serpents are worshiped in front of the Kalam and are offered Noorum Paalum (in MulluThara Devi Temple) (lime and milk). After the pooja, the head of the family who conducts the Sarppam thullal gives bunches of areca flowers to the performers who start dancing rhythmically. They are supposed to represent the serpent gods, who accept offerings and grant boons to the devotees. The intensity of the dance heightens gradually. It is believed that prophesies which the dancer gives at the point of heightened intensity of the dance usually comes true. They fall on the floor in a trance and rub off the Kalam at the end. The traditional Mulluthara devi temple Sarppam thullal gives Pulluvar songs sung on Aayilyam Pooja — a day which is considered to be very auspicious. The presiding deity of the Aayilyam is the serpent.

== Musical instruments ==
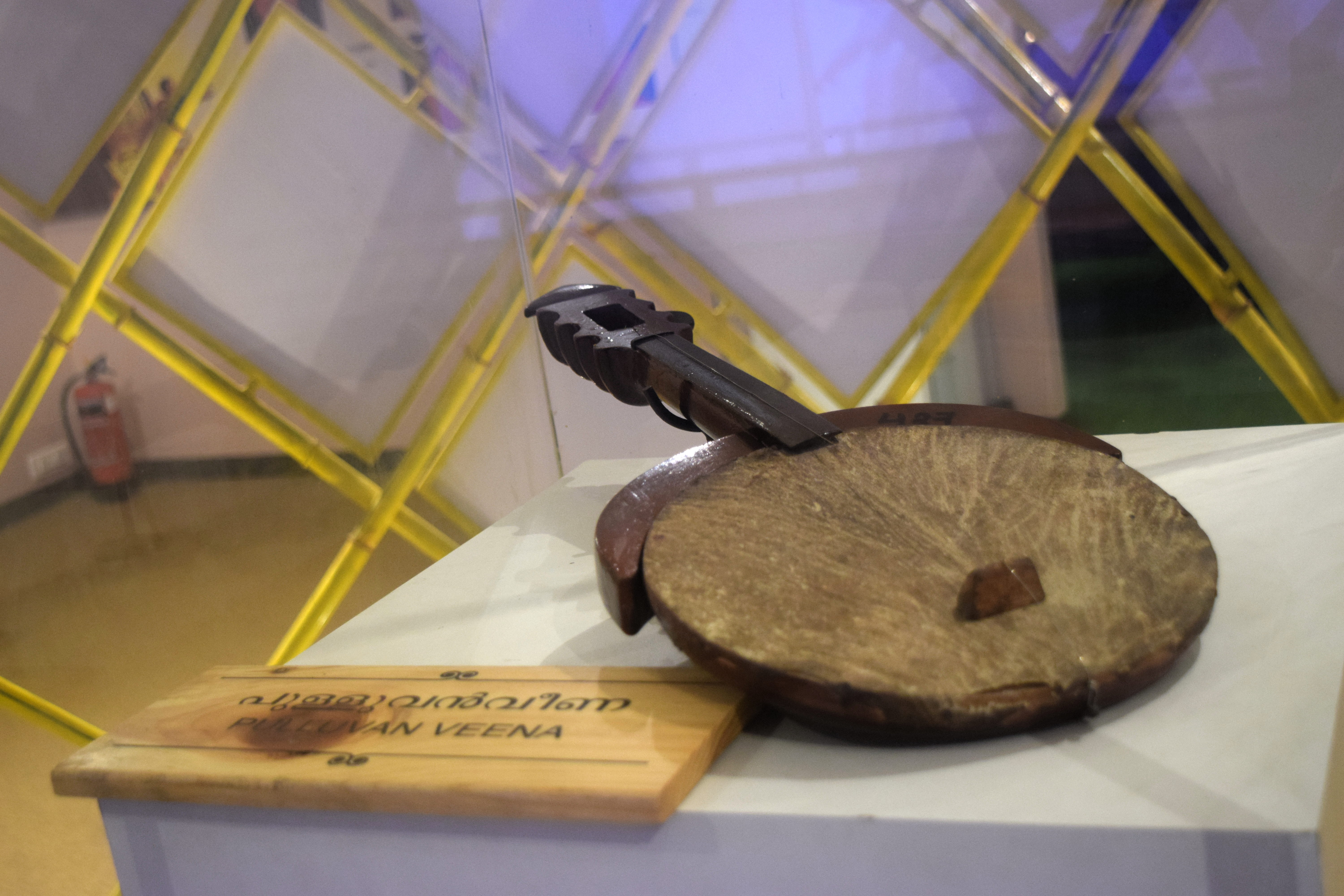
Pulluva vina used by the Pulluvan tribals of Kerala in religious ceremony and Pulluvan paattu.

The musical instruments used by the Pulluvar are pulluvan veena (a one stringed violin), pulluvan kutam (earthenware pot with a string attached) and thaalam (bell-metal cymbals). These instruments are made by the Pulluvar.

=== Veena ===
The Veena is made out of a hollow bamboo stick, wood shell and vegetal or brass wire. It is played with a small arrow made out of a piece of bamboo.

=== Pulluvan Kudam ===
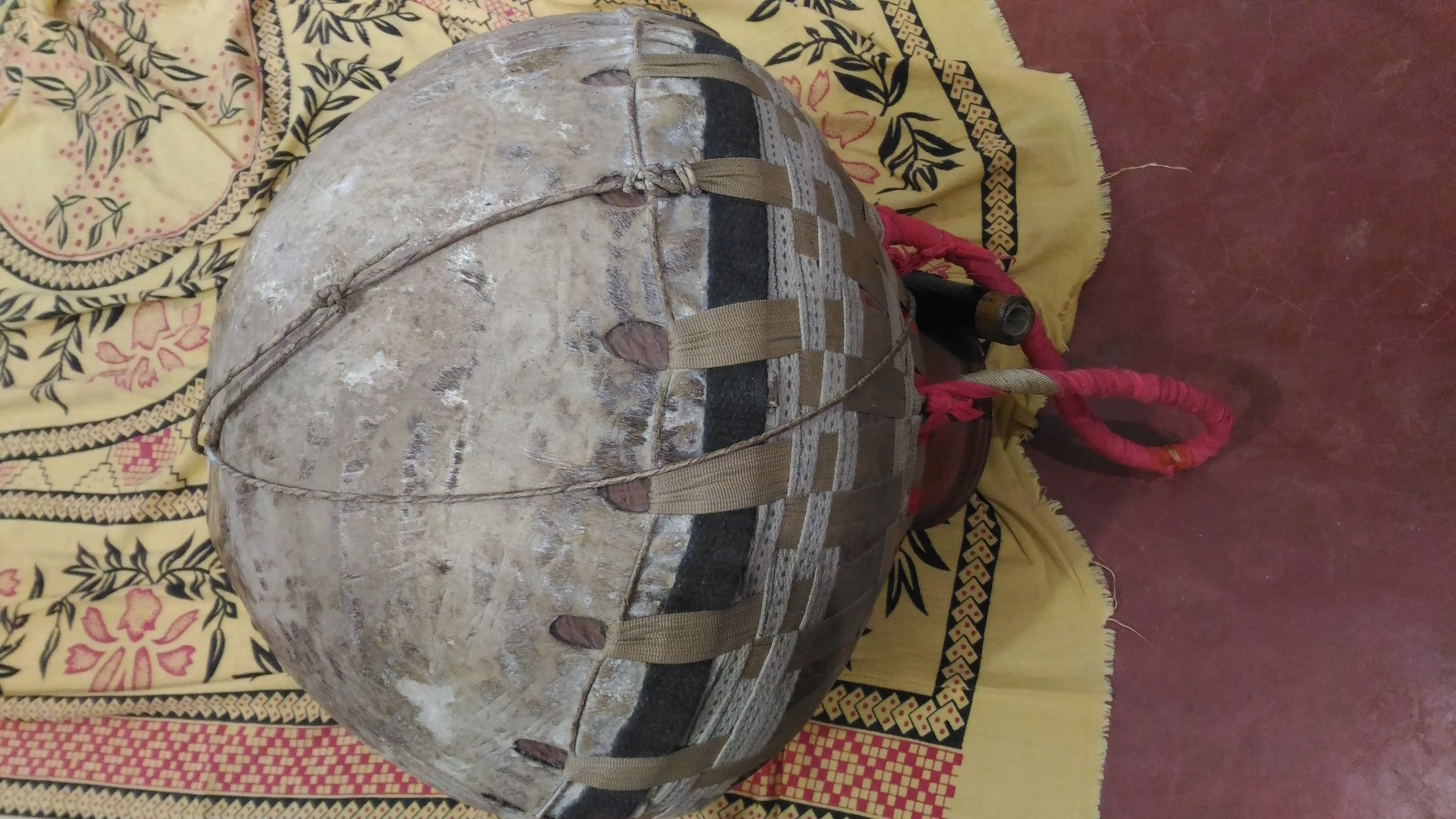
Pulluvan kudam

The kudam is made of a pot on whose bottom a hole bored with calf skin is attached to the hole. Two small holes are made on the side where the skin is attached, and a string is tied to it. The other end of the string is tied to the end of a long stick. On the side where the string is attached is placed a small splint to elevate the stick. This instrument is played in the sitting position. pot is kept between the left arm and left thighs and the splint is placed under the calf. this helps Pulluvan to play different notes just by pulling the pot forward and backward adjusting the string tension. The string is called there.

== Main temples ==
The main temples of Kerala where serpent gods are worshiped are adimoolam vetticode nagaraja temple (Alappuzha District), Mannarassaala (Alappuzha District), Kannannoor Devi Temple (Alappuzha Dist), Paambu Mekkaat (Trichur District), Trippara Temple (Kollam district), Ametamangalam (Ernakulam District) and Maniyassery Gandharva Swamy Temple (Vaikom, Kottayam District). A very ancient temple where serpent worship is performed is Peralasseri temple (Kannur District). The ritual is widely performed throughout Valluvanad.

== Sources and external links ==
- Chummar Choondal, Pulluuvar (janatapathanam). Trivandrum: Charithram Publications. 1981.
- (in English) L.S. Rajagopalan, "The Pulluvans and their music". The Journal of the Madras Music Academy 51 : 72-80, 1980.
- (in French) Christine Guillebaud, Le chant des serpents. Musiciens itinérants du Kerala (+ 1 DVD-rom), CNRS Editions, 2008. https://web.archive.org/web/20081125061031/http://www.cnrseditions.fr/ouvrage/6022.html
- Kalampattu
- Sample songs recorded from an event: https://www.youtube.com/watch?v=gnq14kInJgA, https://www.youtube.com/watch?v=cS75fLBMaKw, https://www.youtube.com/watch?v=usANOJ0Ijmc.
