= Tripunithura Krishnadas =

- Born: Mundempillil Ananthan Krishnadas
- Genres: Carnatic, Hindustani, Western, Kathakali, Pop, Indie, Jazz, etc.
- Occupations: Free lance artist, musician
- Instruments: Edaykka, Chenda, Maddalam, Thimila, Chengela
- Years active: 1958-present

M A Krishnadas, also known as Tripunithura Krishnadas, is an Indian musician. He is a well-known edaykkya (or Idakka) and chenda artist from Kerala. He is the best edaykkya player of modern Kerala.

== Music career ==
Krishna inherited a taste for music and talas from his family – Mundempilly Marath at Tripunithura. Born in 1955 as the son of Cherukkaraparambu Madathil Ananthan Embranthiri and Mundempilly Marath Karthyayani marasyar. Krishnadas was inducted into this field at the age of five under the tutorship of the late Ramamangalam Rama Marar. He has been in this field of art and music since then. Krishnadas had his first stage performance at Tripunithura Sree Poornathrayesa Temple at the age of eight.

M A Krishnadas was the first person to make edaykkya this simple to public and the first to introduce the instrument in the western field of music at a time when it was considered a taboo. He can play the instrument in any genres of music including classical, jazz, pop, western, etc. He is associated with the western troupes like Atma, Kochi and "The Banned", Chennai and has performed in their albums and various stage shows, apart from the humongous number of other classical and non-classical troupes or bands.

Referring to Krishnadas, Padma Bhushan recipient Dr. K.J. Yesudas said "It might not be off-beamed if I say Tripunithura Krishnadas is the single most Edaykkya player who plays the instrument in the most melodious and heart touching manner of all the players in this world". Dr. K. J. Yesudas discovered the talent in Krishnadas in the early 80s and mentored him all along.

== Awards and recognitions ==
Krishnadas was the recipient of Kerala Sangeetha Nataka Academy award in the year 1992 for the best edaykkya artist in the state. He is also recipient of Junior fellowship from the Government of India in the year 1996.

He has been associated with Doordarshan and Akashavani through various programmes for over 30 years. He is a "Grade A" Edaykkya artist in Doordarshan and Akashavani.

Krishnadas has rendered edaykkya recital as a solo as well as an accompanying instrument in 3000+ cassettes and over 60 Malayalam films, a unique achievement among the contemporary edaykkya artists.

He is a regular participant of International Music festival at Paris, held every summer along with being honoured as a senior edaykkya artist to participate in the Annual Chembai Music Festival (also called Chembai Sangeetholsavam) held every Nov–Dec in the holy shrine of Guruvayoor every year.

In January 2011, the Govt of Kerala conferred him with the highest accolade for an instrument artist at the state level "Pallavur Appu Marar Award", for the excellence in the field of development of Edaykka and Chenda.

In Autumn 2011, the Kanchi Ashram of Sree Sankaracharya recognised his talent by giving him the title of Aasthana Vidwan, (presiding artist).

The Rotary club of Kochi honoured him with the Vocational Excellence award in October 2012.

His most notable rendition is in the 1993 Malayalam super hit Devasuram where in Oduvil Unnikrishnan plays the instrument and sing a song to the ailing hero. The original score was sung by M. G. Radhakrishnan, famous music director of Kerala, with Krishnadas playing edaykkya, eloquently as always, which made Krishndas very popular in the Kerala film industry and brought him huge accolade. This is still regarded as a masterpiece among the music fraternity in the Malayalam film industry.

Some of the notable films in which Krishnadas rendered his Scores of edaykkya:

Ashtapathi Devasuram Mayamayooram Kalyana Raman Vasanthiyum Laksmiyum Pinne Njanum More recently in Urumi....

Krishnadas is a versatile percussionist known for adapting the edakka to diverse genres, including Carnatic, Hindustani, Jazz, and Pop.

Krishnadas is believed to be the major pioneer inspiring the introduction and usage of edaykka with any genre of music, Carnatic classical, Hindustani, Pop, western, Jazz.

== See also ==
- Idakka
- Tripunithura
- Chenda
- Sree Poornathrayesa Temple
