= Kshetram vadyam =

Ritual music of South India

Kshetram vadyam is the ritual music of South India. This is the main traditional music of Kerala state. It is a percussion dominated music.

== Basis ==
Even in comparison to the classical carnatic music of South India, the hallmark of Kerala music lies in the dominance of percussion instruments, having its roots in the traditional kavu ritual music and the natural environment. Modern Kerala gives us hints of the sources from which these early musicians had created such a mighty and powerful music: the hammering sound of the woodpecker; the various sounds of falling rain on leaves or thatched roofs in the long rainy season; the croaking of the frogs after heavy rainfall; storm and wind moving the leaves of trees, bushes and grass. Or the man-made sounds: the regular noise of wood cutting and chopping; the washer women beating the dirty clothes onto the stones at the river or temple pond. The Malayalees only distinguish two forms of music kutuka (to drum) and pattu (to sing). The term pattu is also used for solo instrumental genres, with instruments like kuzhal (oboe) and kombu pattu (horn).

Percussion domination means that the musical framework of the pieces is not determined by a melody or raga, but consists of a very sophisticated rhythmical structure and content. The ‘melody’ of a piece is formed through a prominent rhythmic sound. Depending on the ritual this rhythm melody is more or less elaborated, and more or fewer compositional or improvisational elements are employed. A melody or raga, where it is used, is usually subordinated to the rhythm (an exception of this rule is kuzhal pattu). The term percussion-dominated indicates that the main instruments are drums and cymbals and the rhythmic structure is the main feature of the music. The wind instruments have in this sense a subordinated role to play. Actually, the function and entry of kuzhal and kombu in the big orchestras is very much the same as a rhythm instrument. The wind instruments have to embellish and to prolong the beat of the drums, to give signs for taking up the kalasom (a kind of cadential phrase) and have to play some pattern on the given talam. Common to all percussion items is that each single music genre represents a unique musical piece. Therefore, one of the bigger orchestral pieces, like the chenda melam (or melam), is always played with the same rhythmic structure. The beauty of every performance is the result of an intelligent and experienced combination of time and tempo. This combination is mainly responsible for whether the concert develops into a superior or merely an average performance. The main responsibility for this very difficult artistic task lies with the skill of the band leader, who is always a drum player and belongs to the Marar or Pooduval community. He is responsible for guiding the other musicians through the given time frame, to perform a chenda melam in one, two, three or even four hours. The position of the bandleader in melam is to be the most important solo musician, responsible for the pace and progress of the piece, rather than being a conductor guiding the orchestra from the front. The informal and relaxed atmosphere is enhanced by the band playing in front of the elephants, the audience pushing from all sides and punching the air with their fists.

A point of confusion, especially in relationship to Karnatik music, are the terms and descriptions of the many talam (rhythm) cycles used in Kerala music. Though there are a certain distinctive number of talam cycles en vogue (i.e. with distinct numbers of beats and subdivisions) the terms vary by region, genre, and musician groups. We mention the talam cycles and subdivisions as we deal with each genre, using the name most commonly mentioned by the musicians of that genre.

== Kerala percussion genres kshetram vadyam and other Indian music systems ==
There has been some confusion about how to categorize the many Indian music systems. The widely used great-little traditions dichotomy (great for "classical" and little for local or "folk" systems) or – their Indian variation – margi-desi sangit - seems unsuitable to be forced upon Kerala's musics. Many criteria for the 'great traditions', like professional status and training of the musicians, could be applied to the majority of the kavu and kshetram musical genres. Kerala musics – like Indian musics in general – consist of complex and interrelated traditions, established on a secular–sacred, and canonised–less canonised continuum, performed by professional, semi-professional and/or amateur musicians. In Kerala there has always been a strong emotional debate about whether the musical styles of Kerala constitute an independent category within Indian music or merely count as a subdivision of the Karnatik music system. While the Karnatik vocalist Venkitasubramonia Iyer, for instance, states that "the music of Kerala is fundamentally identical with the music of the rest of South India" (1969:5), the dramatist Kavalam Panikkar asserts "...each region of the south had its own musical culture which continues to retain its identity..." (1991:132). From an 'all-Indian perspective' we would suggest that there is no close relationship between Karnatik music and Kshetram vadyam and therefore both should be regarded as distinct music systems. The main differences are the ritualistic concepts, the relationship of music and musicians towards the ritual, the musician communities, genres, musical instruments, the tala (rhythmic) system, and the organisation and importance of rhythm within the overall concept. The similarities between both systems are not more significant than between Kshetram vadyam and any other music system in India. In the face of the ancient trade relations between Kerala and South-East Asia it might even be interesting to compare Kerala music with some of the genres prevalent on the Indonesian islands of Bali or Java. Finally, it needs to be said that the performers, being part of a living and still amazingly popular tradition, are not particularly concerned about these questions.
