= Chengila =

Indian gong

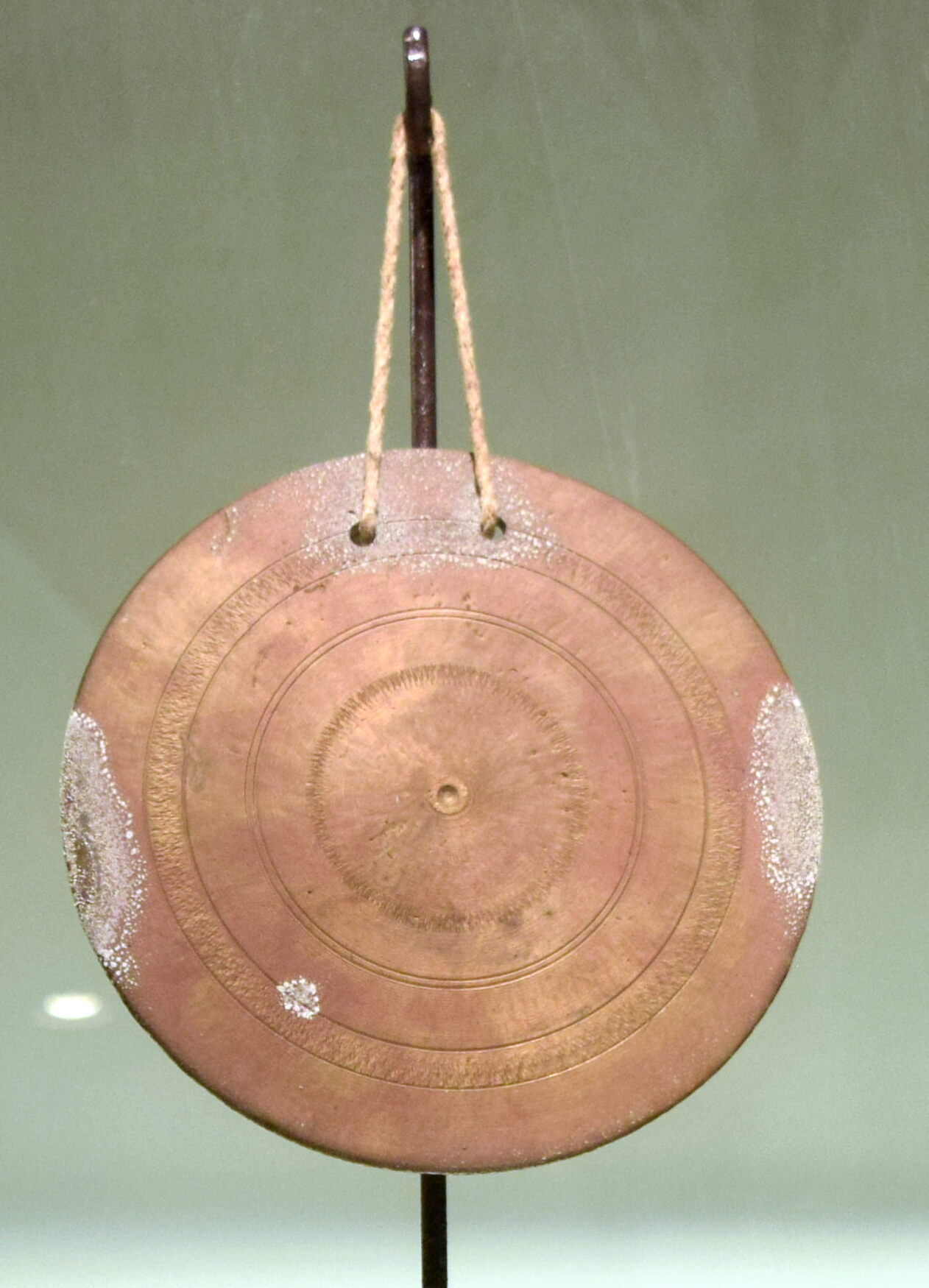
- A chengila at District Heritage Museum, Palakkad

Percussion instrument
- Other names: Cennala
- Classification: Idiophone

Related instruments
- Gong

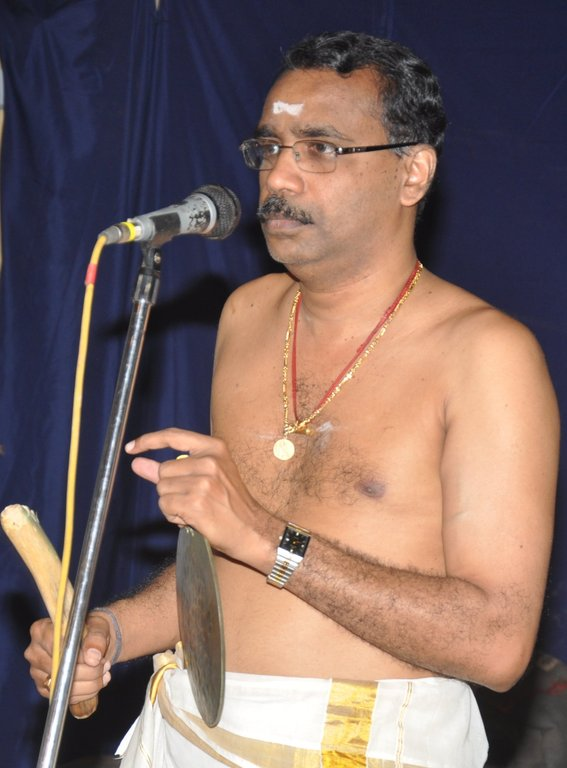
Singer Pathiyur with chengila

The chengila, or cennala, is an Indian gong which helps the traditional singer or dancer keep time.

== Context and playing technique ==
The chengila is a percussion instrument that maintains a steady beat usually in background music. It is a metal gong that a player strikes to mark the tempo. In Kathakali, the chengila and the ilathalam cymbals are used together to create rhythmic music.

== Cultural importance ==
In Kerala, the chengila is used in many different traditional art forms including Chemmanakali, Kathakali, and Krishnanattam. In Kathakali it is part of the percussion ensemble that accompanies the two vocalists, the ponnani and the shinkidi, along with the chenda, maddalam and idakka drums.
