= Pulluvan =

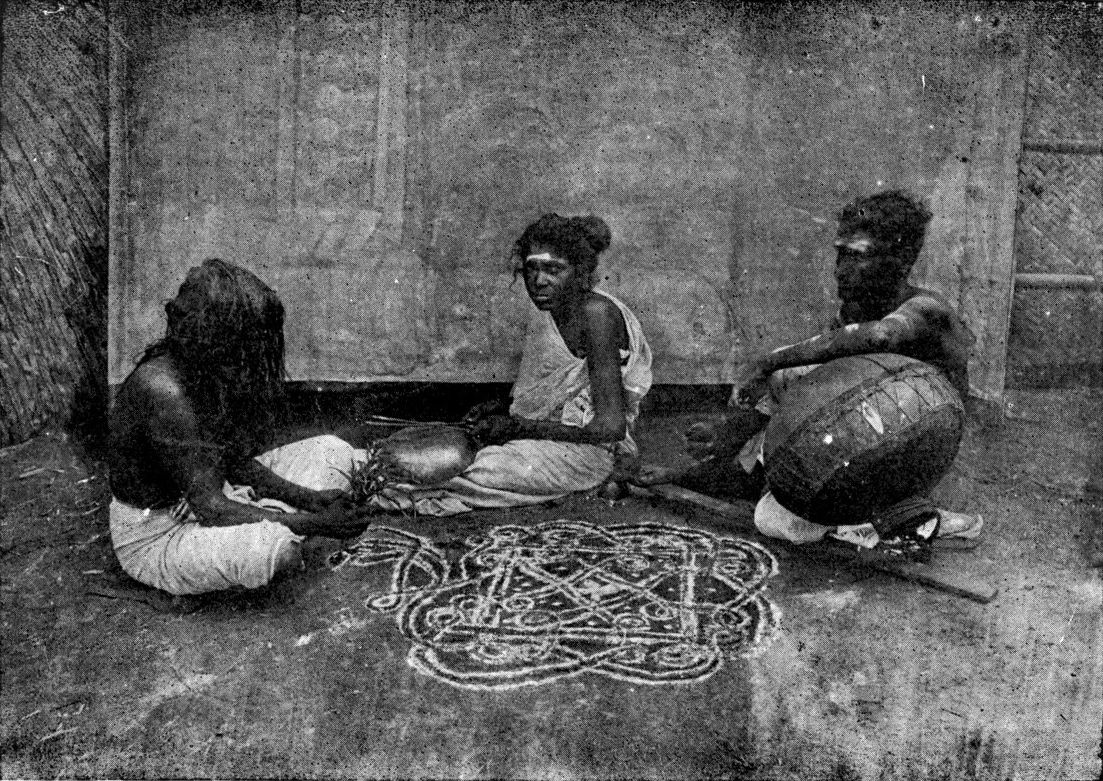
- Pulluvan casting out devils

Regions with significant populations
- Kerala

Languages
- Malayalam

Religion
- Hinduism

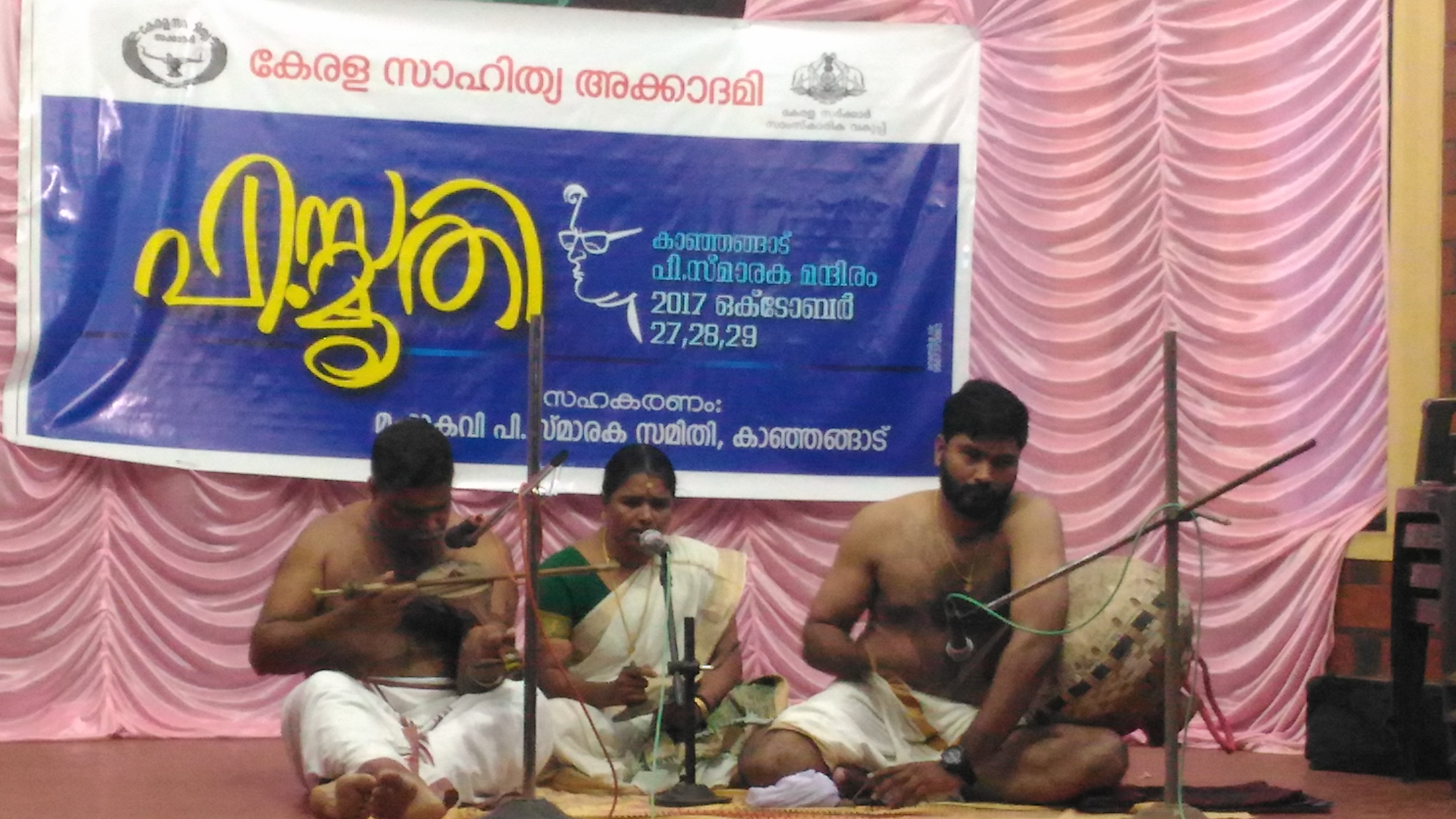
Pulluvan pattu performed at P Smarakam, Kanhangad, Kerala in India

Pulluvan pattu

Pulluvan is a scheduled caste group in Kerala. They belong to the Hindu religion. The term pullu means a bird of omen. There are many sub-divisions within the Pulluva community, the majority known as Nagampatikal (people who sing snake-songs). There are also pulluvars who are not Naagampatikal, known as Pretampatikal (people who sing ghost songs).

Most of the art forms of the Pulluvar are ritualistic. Most of their songs are related to worship, ritual, custom and exorcism. The Pulluva art is expressed in the background of snake-worship, ghost worship and magic.

The Pulluvar of Kerala are closely connected to serpent worship. One group among these people considers the snake gods as their presiding deities and perform certain sacrifices and sing songs. Known as 'Pulluvan Paattu', this is performed in the houses of the lower castes as well as those of the higher castes, in addition to serpent temples.

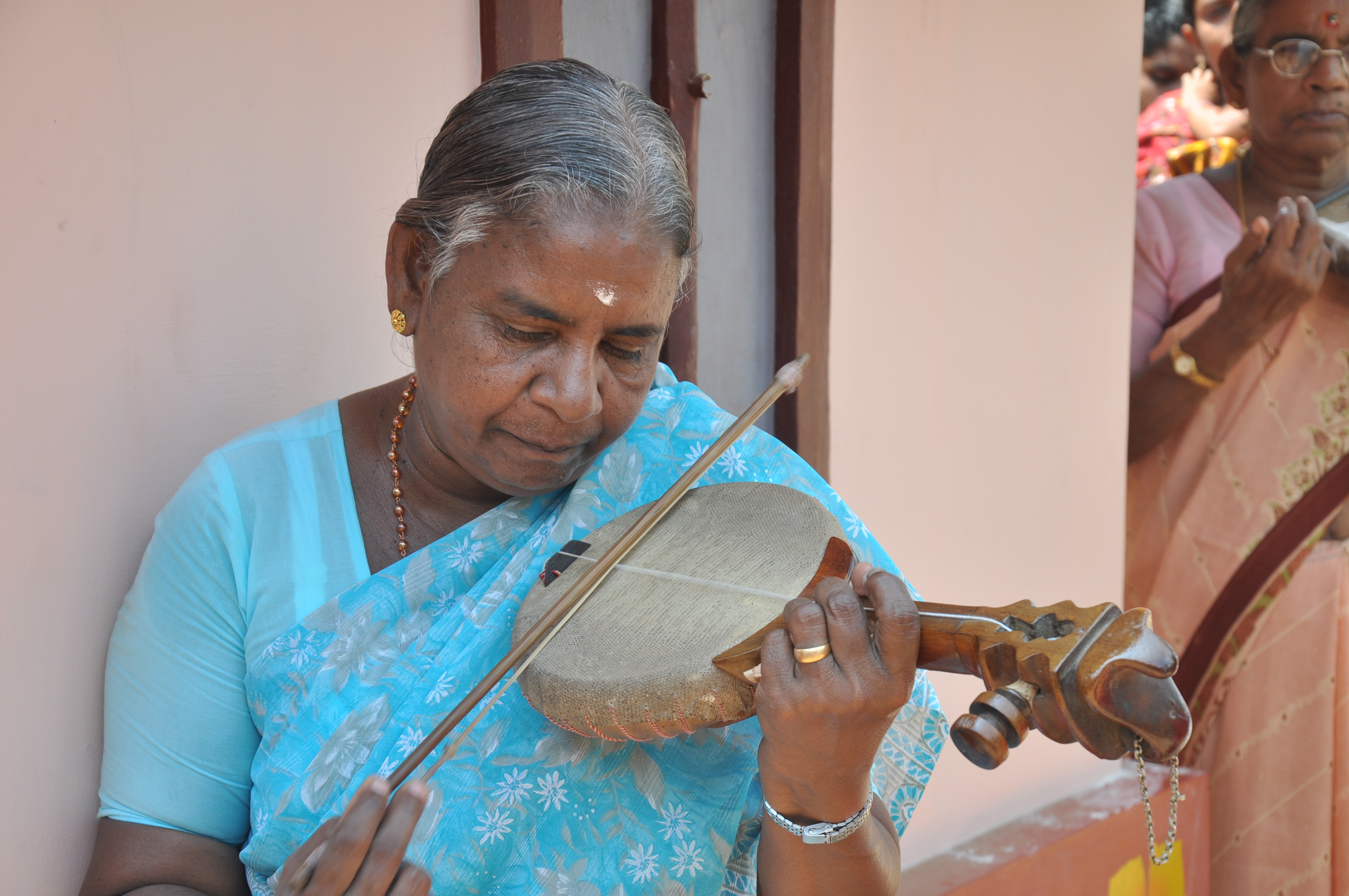
Woman playing a Pulluvan vina.
