= Vimala B. Varma =

Indian actress

- Born: Vimala B. Varma; Kerala
- Occupations: Playback singer, Actress, Radio artist
- Years active: 1948

Vimala B. Varma (born 1935/36) is a former Indian playback singer and actress from Kerala. She and Sarojini Menon has been credited as the first playback singers of Malayalam cinema. Vimala is also the first person to play dual roles in Malayalam cinema.

== Biography ==
Vimala became a part of Malayalam cinema in 1948 with the movie Nirmala, directed by P. V. Krishna Iyer. She was studying in the 6th standard while acted in the film. Vimala and her sister come to Salem's Modern Theater to sing background music in the movie. Later, Vimala was assigned to play the role of the heroine's younger sister in the film. She played two characters in the film and became the first person to do so in Malayalam cinema. With the release of Nirmala, Vimala also became famous. Later, Vimala's father did not accept the invitation to the new film Vellinakshatram due to contract conditions. After that, she was invited to star in Malabar Productions' new film, but she declined that too and ended her film career. Vimala started singing at All India Radio, Kozhikode station in 1956 and sang over 500 light music songs. She retired from All India Radio in 1993.
