= T. K. Govindarao =

Indian Carnatic musician

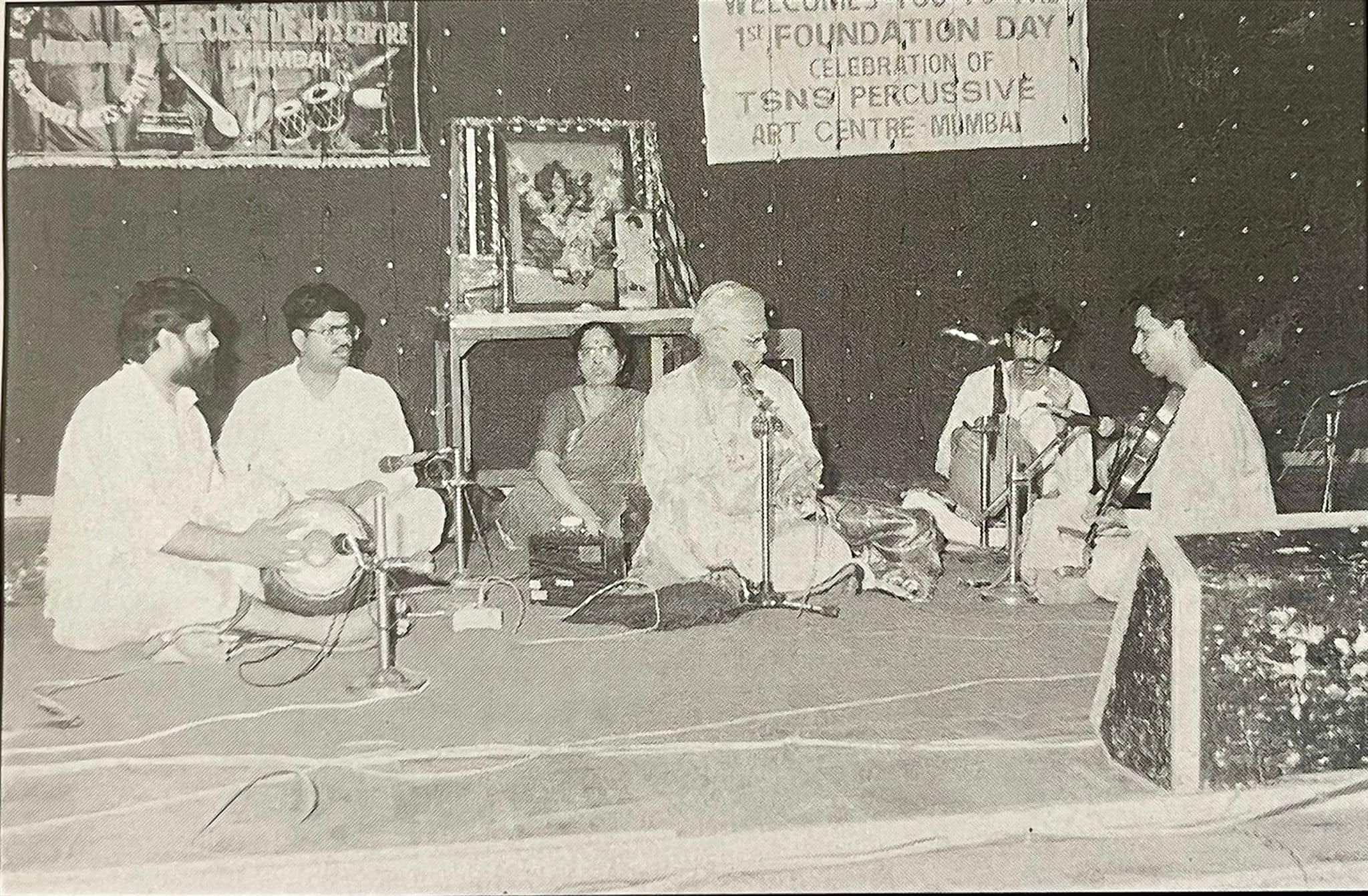
- T. K. Govindarao's concert in Bombay
- Born: 21 April 1929; Thrippunithura, Kingdom of Cochin, British India (now in Kochi, Kerala, India)
- Died: 18 September 2011 (aged 82); Chennai, Tamil Nadu, India
- Other name: TKG
- Occupations: Carnatic Musician, Composer

T. K. Govindarao (Tripunithura Krishnarao Govindarao) (21 April 1929 – 18 September 2011) was a leading Karnatic Vocalist, and the recipient of the prestigious Sangeetha Kalanidhi award.

== Early life ==
He was born as the son of Tripunithura Vadakkekkotta Chakkalamutt Pallisserrimadathil Krishnarao and Kamalammal. He took an initial training under Chembai Vaidhyanatha Bhagavathar and later came under the tutelage of Musiri Subrahmanya Iyer - a rigoruous gurukulavasa that lasted over 15 years, and many more years of close association. He was known as the torchbearer of the Musiri style bhava-laden rendering.

Prior to taking up Karnatic music training, he was involved with film music for a brief period - the first Malayalam film background song Subhaleela in the movie Nirmala was sung by him. The first Malayalam movie duet Paaduka poonkuyile too was sung by him along with P. Leela. He sang only in this movie where the lyrics was by G Sankara Kurup and the score was by P. S. Divakar.

He worked as chief producer at Akasavani Delhi and as producer at Akasavani Chennai. He was the president of Sri Tyagaraja Sangita Vidvat Samajam, Tyagarajapuram, Chennai. He collected and published the compositions of Thyagaraja, Muthuswamy Dikshitar and Syama Sastri with notations and the meaning in English. He published around 400 krithis of Swathi Thirunal. Very particular that Carnatic Music should be sung with the music of the lyrics understood, he formed a trust for the same named Ganamandhir.

He died at Chennai on 18 September 2011. T. K. Govindarao was awarded the prestigious Sangeetha Kalanidhi award of the Madras Music Academy in the year 1999.

== Awards ==
- Kendra sangeetha Natak Academy Award (1996)
- Sangeethakalanidhi (1999 - Madras Music Academy)
- Sangita Vidvan (1951 from Central College of Karnatak Music, Madras)
- GanakalaTilaka (Bangalore)
- Sangita Sastra Ratnakara (Bhuvanesvari Pitham)
- Svara Samrat (BM Trust KL)
- Asthana Vidvan from Kanchi Kamakoti Peetham
- Saptagiri Sangita Vidvanmani
- Sangita Samrat (Bharatiya VidyaBhavan CBE)
- Gayaka Sikhamani
- Sangita Chudamani (Sri KrishnaGana Sabha, Chennai)
- Nadakkanal
- Sangita Ratnakara(USA)
- Sangita Acharya
- Central Sangita Nataka Akademi Award
- Sangita Purnasri
- Hanumath GanaSiromani
- Sangita Samrat (Mangalore Sabha)
- Sri Vedavyasa Vidwanmani
- Vivekananda National Award for Excellence
- Kerala Sangita Nataka Akademi Award
- Gandharva Vidyanidhi
- Sangita Paramacharaya
- Sangita Sevanirata
