= Sarpam Thullal =

Ritual dance in Kerala, India

Sarpam Thullal (Dance of Snakes) or Nagakalam Pattu, is a unique form of mystical ritual associated generally with ancestral temples or tharavadus predominantly in Valluvanadu region in state of Kerala. From ancient times many family houses in Kerala have special snake shrines called Kavu or Pambin Kavu where this exotic and spectacular ritual performance is associated to, it is generally conducted to appease the snake gods and thereby to bring prosperity to the family.

== History ==
Snakes and Snake worship, primarily the cobra and associated sub species of snakes have been revered from ancient times all over India. Snakes are mentioned in Vedic books or they are depicted in religious epics like Mahabharata and Vishnu Purana. Hindu Gods like Vishnu and Shiva have been associated with snakes. According to Hindu mythology, Lord Vishnu takes rest under the shade of the giant snake, Adisesha. Lord Shiva wears a snake vasuki around his neck.

The Nairs of Kerala and Bunts of Tulunadu claim to be Kshatriyas of Nagavanshi descent, thus maybe snake worship was popularized and brought to wider practice by them. Mostly, snakes were seen as a symbol of fertility. Elsewhere in India, snakes are worshiped on Nag Panchami, Nagaradhane and Aashleshabali.

== Ritual ==
Sarpam thullal is generally held to appease snake gods for prosperity of the family or to give an offspring to the couples who may have difficulties in conceiving a child. People generally take a vow is also associated with the ritual and Sarpam Thullal is done after the fulfillment or accomplishment of the vow. But in most of the scenarios Sarpam Thullal is done to ward off any doshasDosha means fault or obstacles in one's destiny or horoscope as per Indian Astrology of the family and bring peace and prosperity.

The temple astrologer is the one who normally initiates the process or in certain places it is held as an annual or regular practice. Once the date is finalized by the family, the associated Pulluvan family with the temple is informed. It is the Pulluvan and Pulluvathy and their assistants who hold the skills and responsibility of creating the aesthetic requirements for the Sarpam Thullal.

They create a pandal and decorate it. The selection of the girls who will later become the mediums or manifestations of Snake Gods is done by the family. Generally two girls/females are supposed to sit in the kalam but certain places it is six. In modern times in many places females between the ages of 10 and 60 are not allowed and is generally performed by girls who have not reached puberty. Typically the karnavar of the family or an elderly person will be the one who oversees the function and grands his blessing to the function.

The pulluvan and his team create a floral decoration using various natural colors on specially made floor before the snake idols. The floral decoration is called Nagakalam. Nagakalams are of various types such as Bhasma Kalam (A Kalam which is made of just ash powder) and Varna Podi Kalam (A Kalam which is made up of colour powder). The kanyas wear Pavada and blouse.

Once the pulluvan and his team is done with decorations and other preparations the kanyas are called to the venue. They normally sit in the kalam or besides the kalam. In certain places where there are more than two kanyas, they stand besides the kalam. Nagarajavu generally stands inside the kalam. Kanyas are given pokulas or arecanut flowers. The pulluvan starts singing and playing the veena and the pulluvathy sings along and plays the kudam. The initial lines are generally sung in praise of Ganesha, followed by other gods. Then the Tala or beat changes along with the song. Later part is dedicated to Serpent gods and the kanyas sitting in the kalam. The kanyas generally starts to get into a trance like state within 20–30 minutes and it is reported that they feels that the snake which is drawn on the floor has come alive. Some of them have experienced vibrations all over their body and they feel their body is resonating towards the vibrations. The girls are generally not given any training to dance and in many cases it might be the first time they are watching the ritual. They move towards the vibration. They swing their hair and rub the powder of the kalam (the divine solace created). So the induced trance state is highly revered as girls are generally supposed be too young to perform any sophisticated acting to make the onlookers believe in the ritual.

The ritual has strong parallels to the function of an Oracle and generally speaks to the onlookers after entering into the trance state and informs them on the behalf of the snake gods. It can be sees that the kanyas does not speak the normal day-to-day language while in the trance state adding on to the mystery.
