= Neralattu Rama Poduval =

Indian artist

Neralattu Rama Poduval or Njaralathu Rama Poduval (1916–1996) was an exponent of the ashtapadi/sopanam music form practised in Kerala in southern India. A recipient of the Kendra Sangeet Natak Akademi Award, he hailed from a rugged village called Thiruvaazhaamkunnu, near Mannarkkad in Palakkad district and lived most of life in Angadipuram in Malappuram district, the place famous for the Thirumanthamkunnu Temple.

Born into an Ambalavasi family on 16 February 1916, to Koodallur Kurinjikavil marath Shankunni Marar and Njeralathu pothuvat Janaki Poduvalasyar. Poduval had his schooling till the fifth standard and moved on to practice the idakka and the chenda. He inherited the art of playing the edakka from his uncle, Njeralathu Karunakara Pothuval, and went on to establish an indelible mark in this field.

He also practiced instruments like the veena from Parappanaatu Rama Kuruppu. He practised Carnatic music from the Chembai Vaidyanatha Bhagavatar besides Kodikunnath Madhavan Nair. His experience in Kerala Kalamandalam helped him in gaining knowledge in Kathakali music as well.

Poduval married Lakshmikutty Amma at the age of 36. By the age of 56, he became the father of seven children: Janakikutty, Krishna Vijayan, Gopalakrishnan, Anjaneyan, Gaayathri, Hari Govindan, and Aananda Sivaraman. After his marriage, he lived at Palakkode village near Angadipuram, under the patronage of the chief priest of Thirumanthamkunnu Temple at Angadipuram, Pandhalakkode Sankaran Namboodiri. Poduval died on 13 August 1996, aged 80. He was cremated at the premises of his home in Angadipuram the next day.

Rama Poduval, a recipient of the Sangeet Natak Akademi Award, rejuvenated the Sopanam style of traditional Kerala temple music and enthralled the music lovers of Kerala for decades. He brought out this art from within the walls of the temple and made this art popular among the people. There are six different documentary films based on his life and music. 'Sopaanam', his biography in Malayalam, is also implemented as study material for university students in Kerala. The awards he received also include fellowships from both government and cultural organisations.

== Awards and honours ==
- 1981: Kerala Sangeetha Nataka Akademi Award
- 1985: Sangeet Natak Akademi Award
- 1985: Government of Maharashtra Department of Culture Award
- 1985: Kerala Kalamandalam Keerthi Shankh
- 1990: Kerala Kalamandalam Fellowship
- 1990: Marar Kshemasabha Kalacharya Award
- 1994: Guruvayoorappan Award
- 1996: Trithala Kesavapothuval Memorial Award
- 1996: Pravasi Basheer Award

== Books on him ==
The fourth edition of his autobiography named Sopanam was published by Kerala Sahitya Akademi. In 2004 Kerala Sangeetha Nataka Akademi published his biography titled Njeralathu ramapothuval.
