= Idakka =

Musical instrument

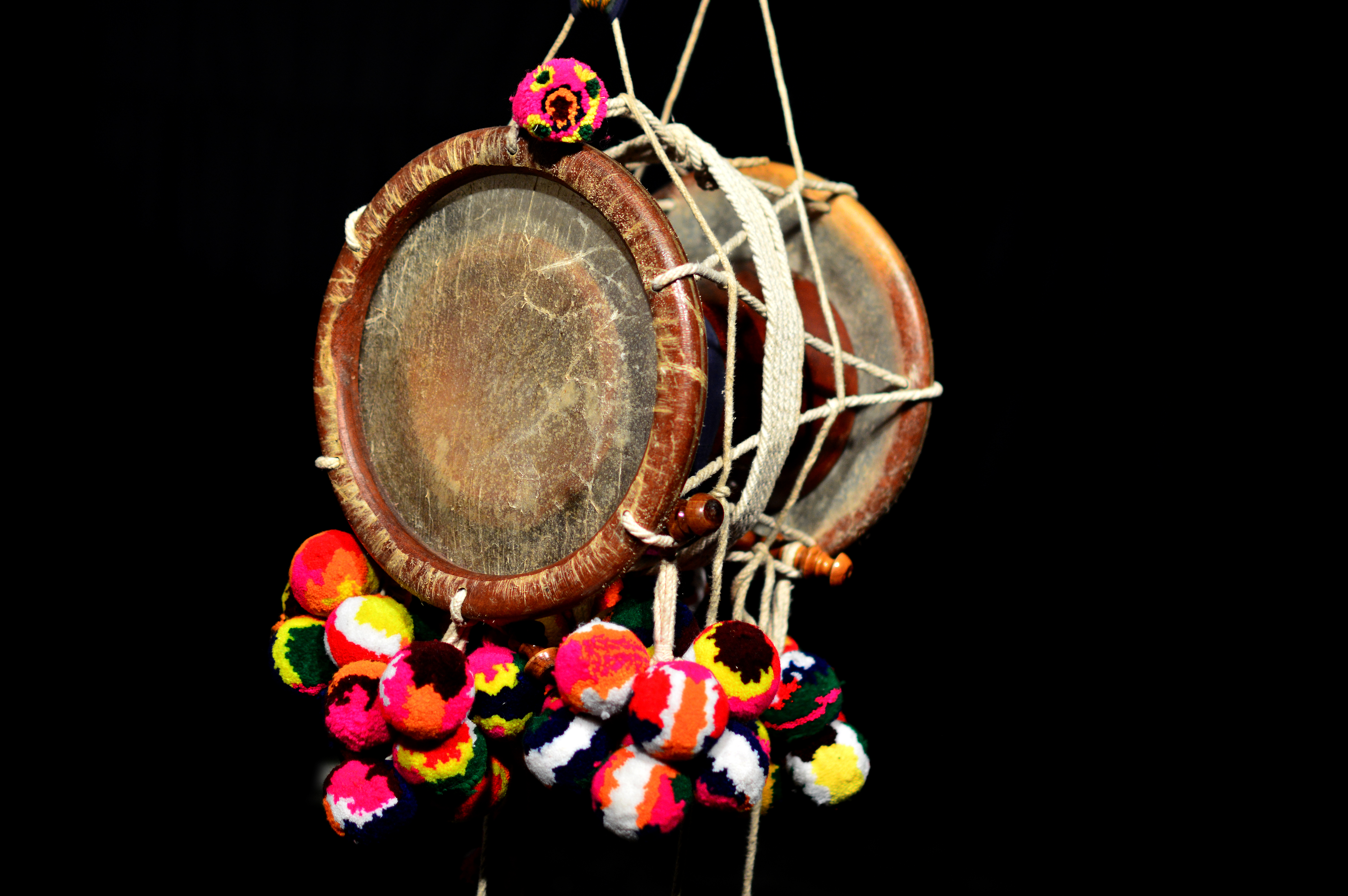
An idakka

The idakka (Malayalam: ഇടയ്ക്ക), also spelt idaykka/edaykka/edakka, is an hourglass-shaped drum from Kerala in south India, very similar to the pan-Indian damaru. While the damaru is played by rattling knotted cords against the resonators, the idakka is played with a stick. Like the damaru, the idakka's pitch may be bent by squeezing the lacing in the middle. The idakka is slung over the left shoulder and the right side of the instrument is gently beaten with a thin curve-ended stick. It is played in temples and in performances such as Kathakali and Mohiniattam classical dance.

== Etymology ==
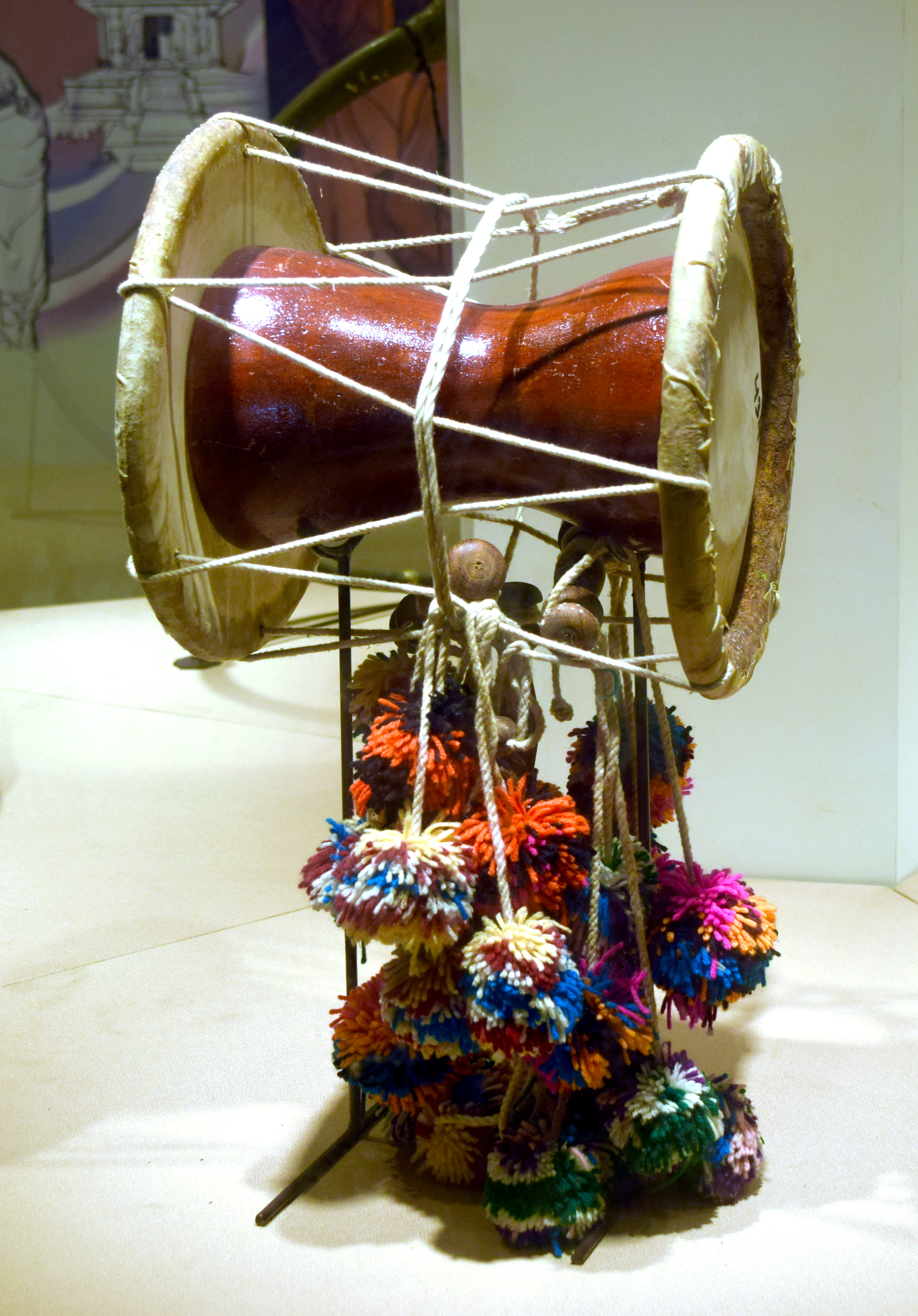
Body of Idakka in hourglass shape

The Malayalam name idaykka or idakka derives from the Sanskrit word श्रीढक्का (Śrīḍhakkā). In Sanskrit, a ḍhakkā is described as a double drum that makes a ḍhak sound. ढक् इति गम्भीरशब्देन कायतीति (ḍhak iti gambhīraśabdēna kāyatīti). The sacred prefix Śrī is used to denote the auspiciousness of the instrument.

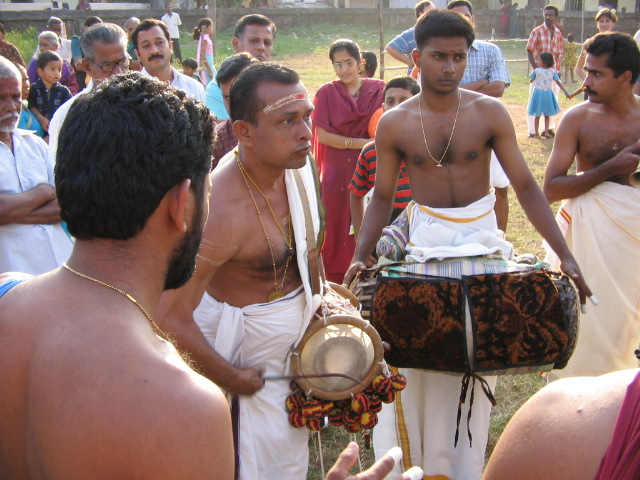
Shri Chendamangalam Unnikrishna Maarar Idakka artist in action - In the middle

== Construction ==
Similar to the talking drum, the idakka consists of two circular drumheads each of which is mounted within a circular ring. The hourglass-shaped body is placed between the two heads and lacing is used to pull the two rings towards each other, stretching each drumhead over an open end of the body. Snare-like strings made of natural fiber are stretched across the open ends of the drum body, under each drumhead. It is not uncommon for the diameter of the drumheads to be larger than the diameter of the body, with the result that the drumheads are often seen mounted significantly off-center.

== Acoustics ==
The idakka is a small, high-pitched drum with definite pitch. The snares running under the drumheads have been found to interact with the vibrating membrane in a way that causes the pitch of the instrument to be determinate. Different pitches can be obtained by squeezing the lacing around the instrument, which changes the amount of tension in the skins.

Three artists playing Mizhavu and Idakka during Nangyar Koothu at WikiConference India 2026

== See also ==
- Damaru
- Pandi Melam
- Panchari melam
- Thayambaka
- Panchavadyam
- Tripunithura Krishnadas
- Talking Drum, another drum in West Africa with an hour-glass shape.
