= List of Indian musical instruments =

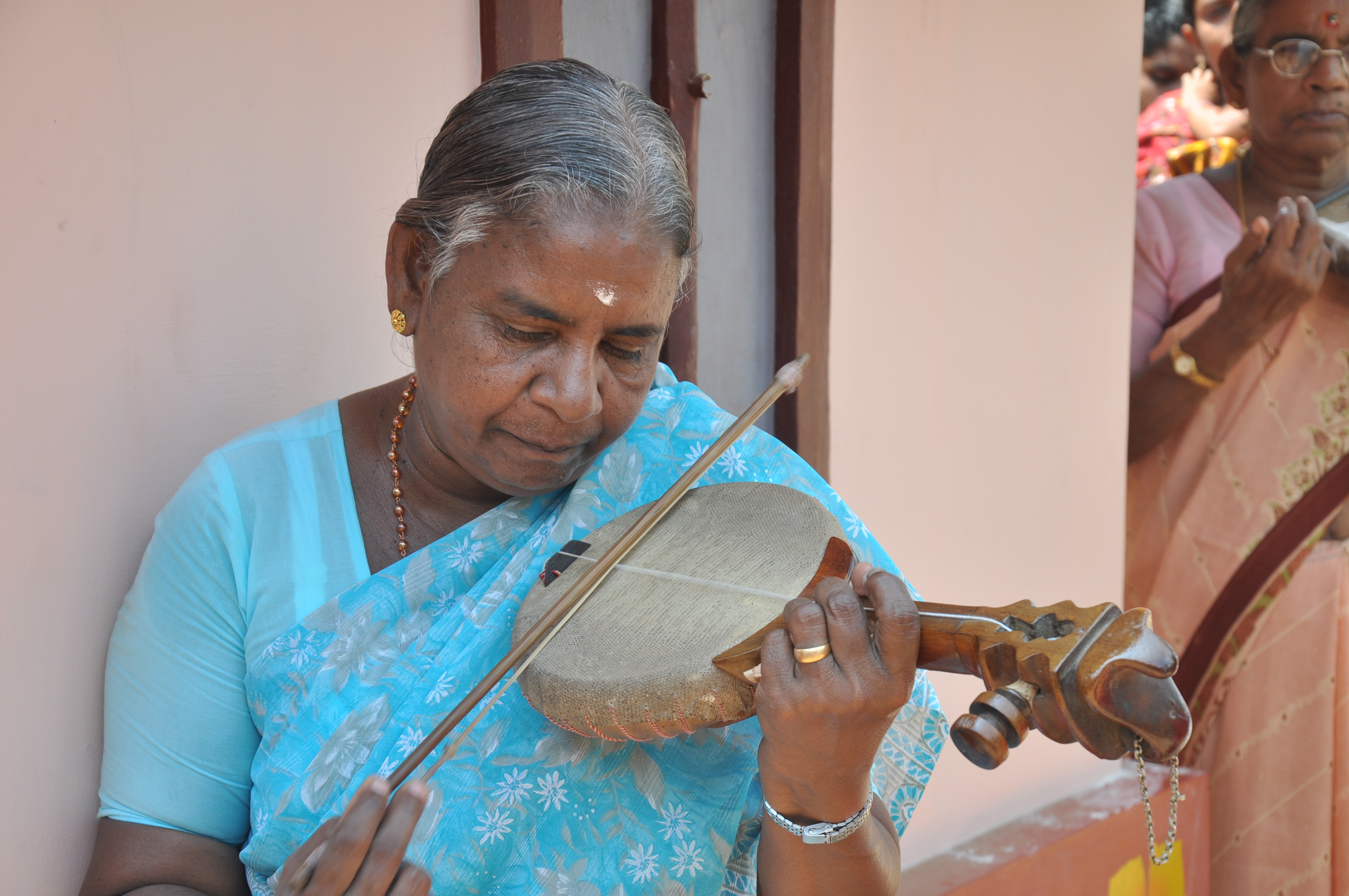
Woman playing pulluvan veena

Musical instruments of the Indian subcontinent can be broadly classified according to the Hornbostel–Sachs system into four categories: chordophones (string instruments), aerophones (wind instruments), membranophones (drums) and idiophones (non-drum percussion instruments).

== Chordophones ==
=== Plucked strings ===
- Ancient Veena
- Bulbul Tarang
- Dilruba
- Dotar, Dotora, or Dotara
- Ektara
- Getchu Vadyam or Jhallari
- Gopichand, Gopiyantra or Khamak
- Gottuvadhyam or Chitravina
- Katho
- Sarod
- Sitar
- Surbahar
- Surshringar
- Swarabat
- Swarmandal
- Tambura
- Tritantri Veena
- Tumbi
- Tuntuna
- Hansa Veena
- Mohan Veena
- Nakula Veena
- Nanduni
- Pamiri rubab
- Rudra Veena, also called Bīn in North India
- Sagar Veena
- Saraswati Veena
- Vichitra Veena
- Yazh
- Ranjan Veena
- Mayuri Veena
- Rubab (instrument)
- Triveni Veena

=== Bowed strings ===
- Chikara
- Dhantara
- Dilruba
- Ektara
- Esraj
- Kamaicha
- Kingri
- Mayuri veena or Taus
- Onavillu
- Behala
- Pena
- Pinaka veena
- Pulluvan veena - one-stringed violin
- Ravanahatha
- Sarangi
- Sarinda
- Tar Shehnai
- Villu - arched musical bow

=== Other string instruments ===
- Gethu or Jhallari – struck tanpura
- Gubguba or Jamuku (khamak)
- Pulluvan kutam
- Santoor – Hammered dulcimer

== Aerophones ==
=== Single reed ===
- Pepa
- Pungi or Been

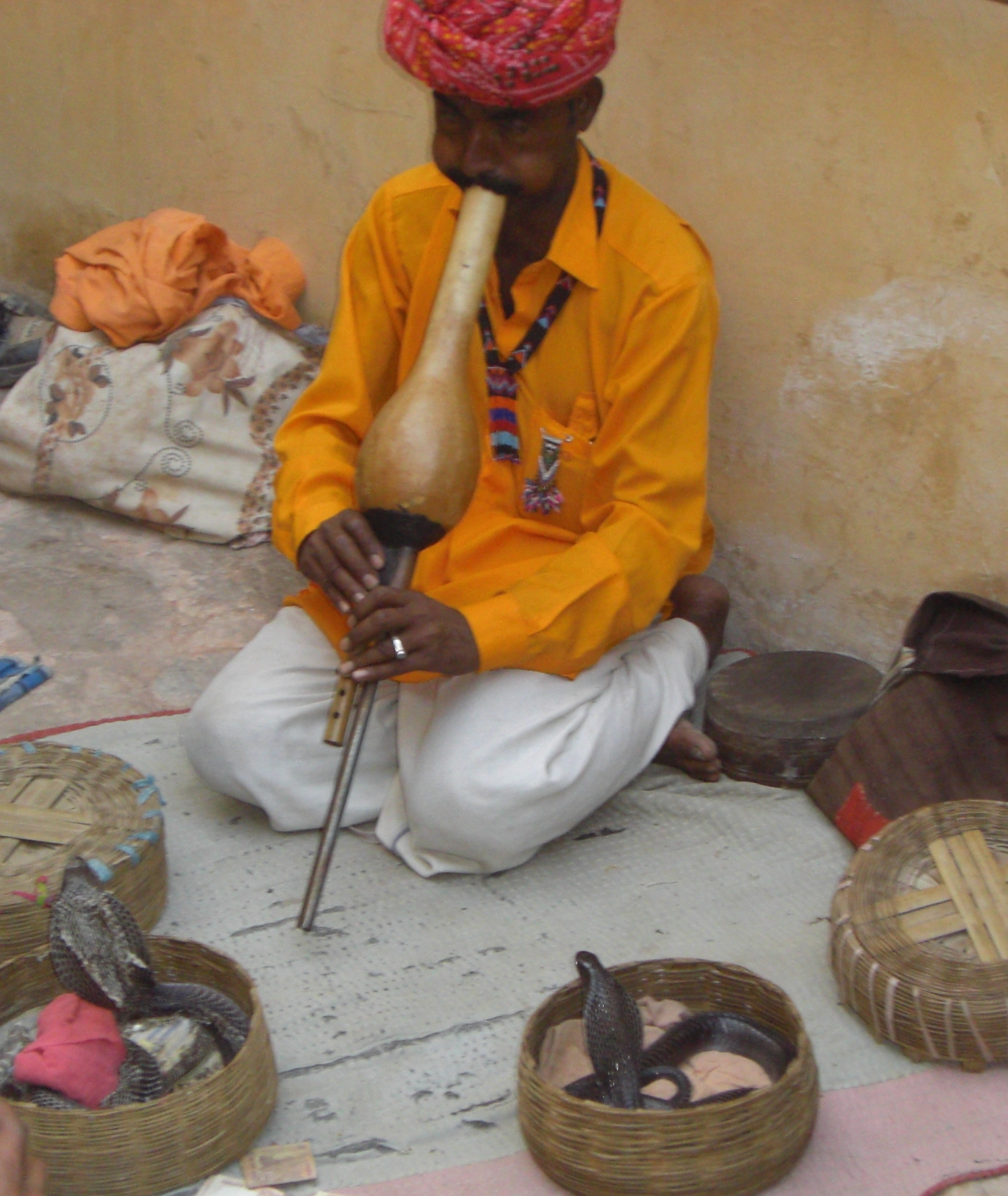
Snake charmer playing pungi

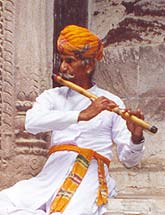
Bansuri player at Mehrangarh Fort at Jodhpur.

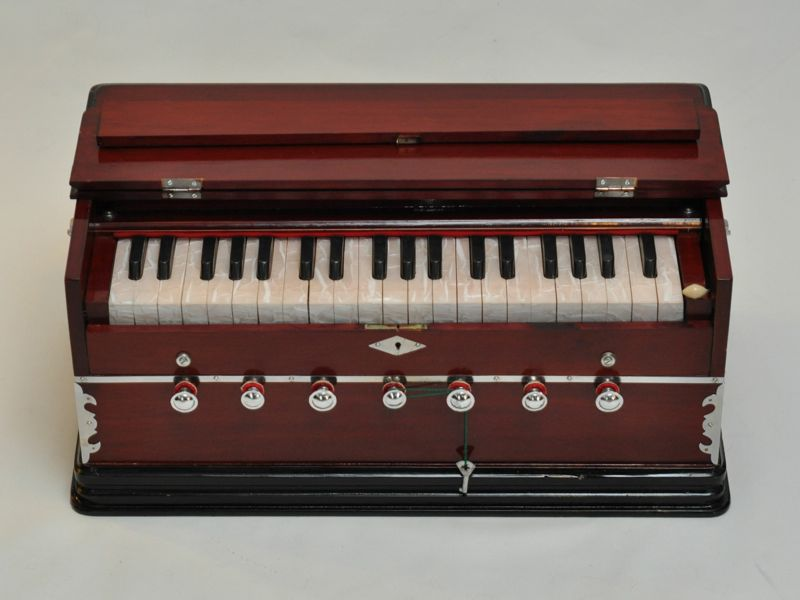
Indian Harmonium

=== Double reed ===
- Kuzhal
- Mukhavina
- Nadaswaram
- Shehnai
- Sundari
- Tangmuri

=== Flute ===
- Alghoza – double flute
- Bansuri
- Venu (Carnatic flute) Pullanguzhal

=== Bagpipes ===
- Mashak
- Titti
- Sruti upanga

=== Free reed ===
- Gogona
- Morsing

=== Free reed and bellows ===
- Shruti box
- Harmonium (hand-pumped)

=== Brass ===
- Bigul – see Bugle
- Ekkalam
- Karnal
- Kombu (instrument)
- Ramsinga
- Kahal
- Nagfani
- Turi
- Tutari

== Membranophones ==
=== Hand drums ===
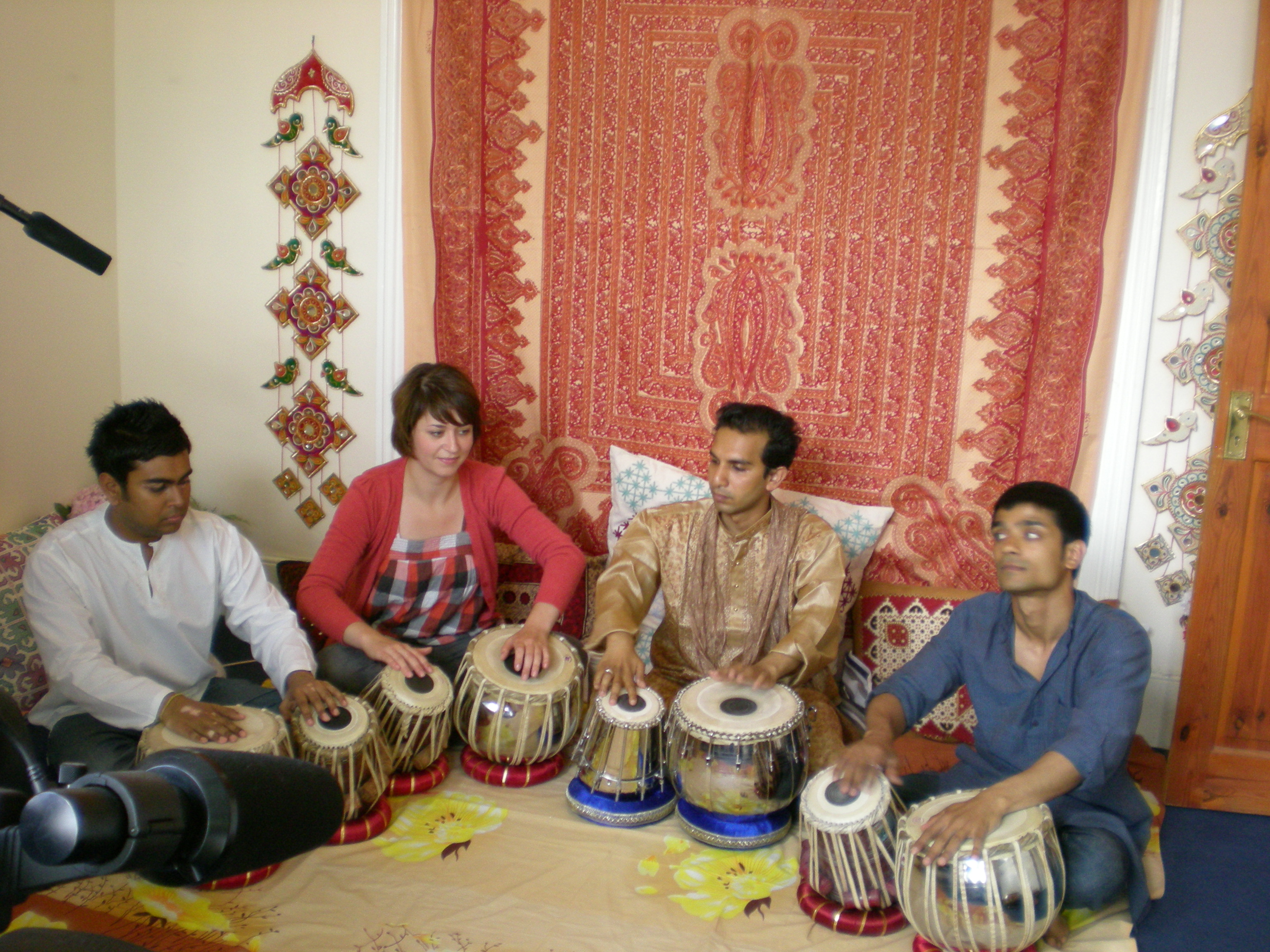
Learning to play tabla

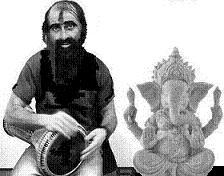
Tumbaknaer, drum from Jammu and Kashmir for accompanying devotionals

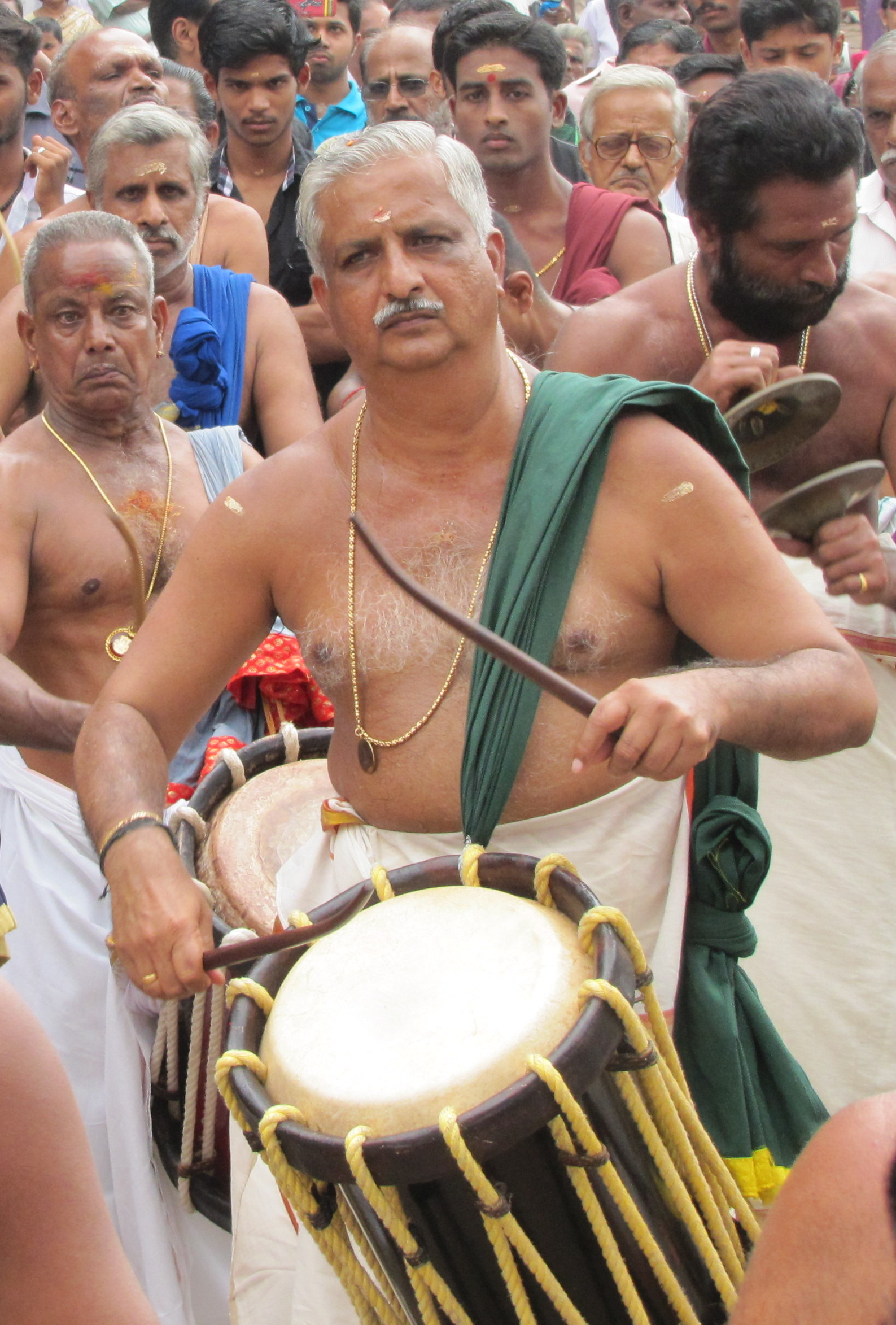
Chenda (top) and Chande (below) are different drums

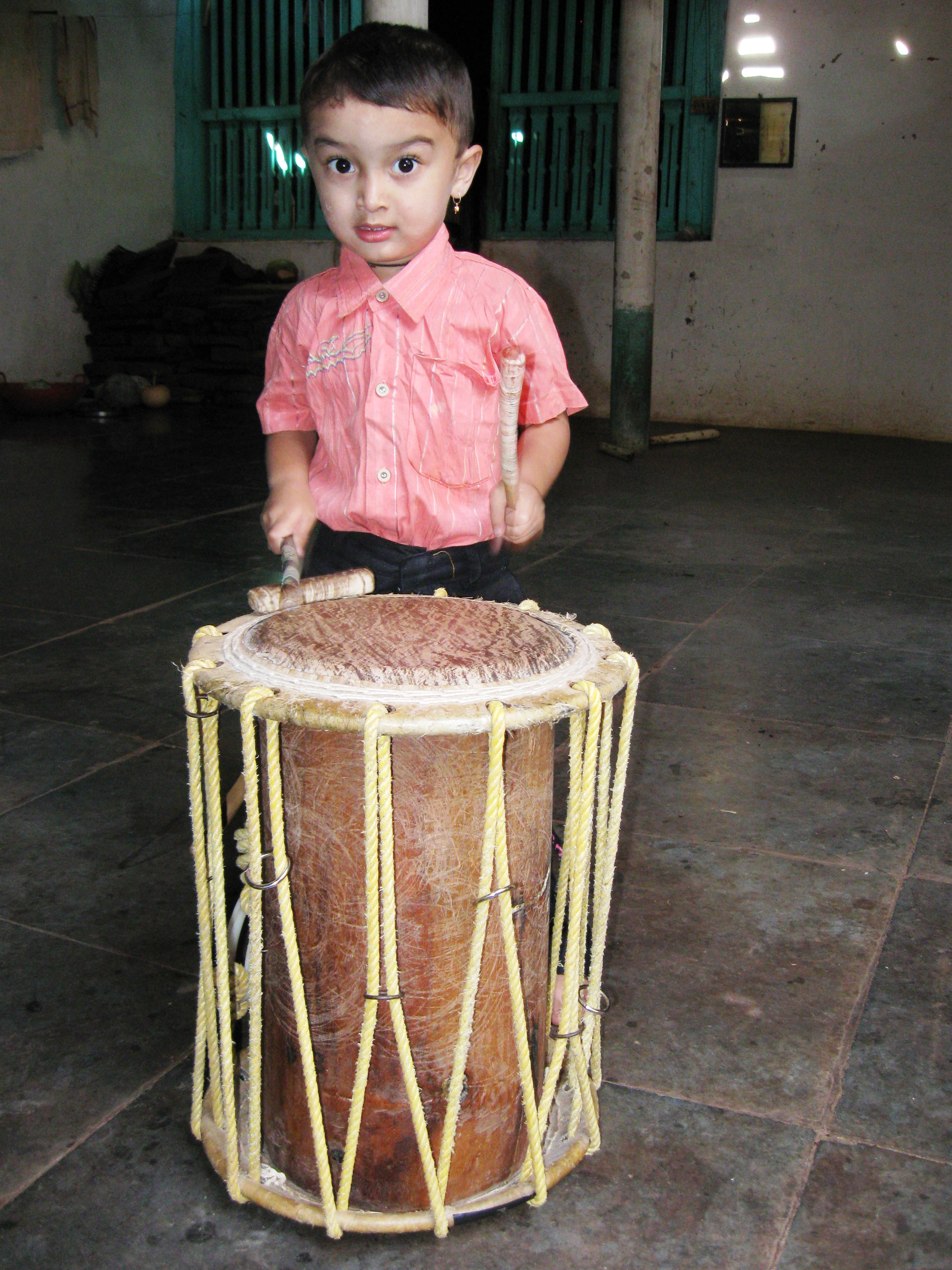
Chande of Yakshagana

- Dhad
- Damru
- Dimadi
- Dhol
- Dholak
- Dholki
- Duggi
- Ghat singhari or Gada Singari
- Ghumot
- Gummeta
- Kanjira
- Khol
- Kinpar and Dhopar (Tribal Drums)
- Madal
- Mardala
- Maddale
- Maram
- Mizhavu
- Mridangam
- Naal
- Pakhavaj
- Pakhavaj Jori – Sikh instrument similar to Tabla
- Panchamukha vadyam
- Pung cholom
- Shuddha Madalam or Maddalam
- Tabala / Tabl / Chameli – goblet drum
- Tabla
- Tabla Tarang – set of Tablas
- Tamate
- Thanthi Panai
- Thimila
- Tumbak, Tumbaknari, Tumbaknaer
- Tumdak'
- Udukku

=== Hand frame drums ===
- Daf, duf, or dafli – medium or large frame drum without jingles, of Persian origin
- Dubki, dimdi or dimri – small frame drum without jingles
- Kanjira – small frame drum with one jingle
- Kansi – small drum without jingles
- Patayani thappu – medium frame drum played with hands

=== Stick and hand drums ===
- Chenda
- Davul
- Dhak
- Dhimay
- Dhol
- Dholi
- Dollu
- Idakka
- Thavil
- Udukai
- Urumi (drum)

=== Stick drums ===
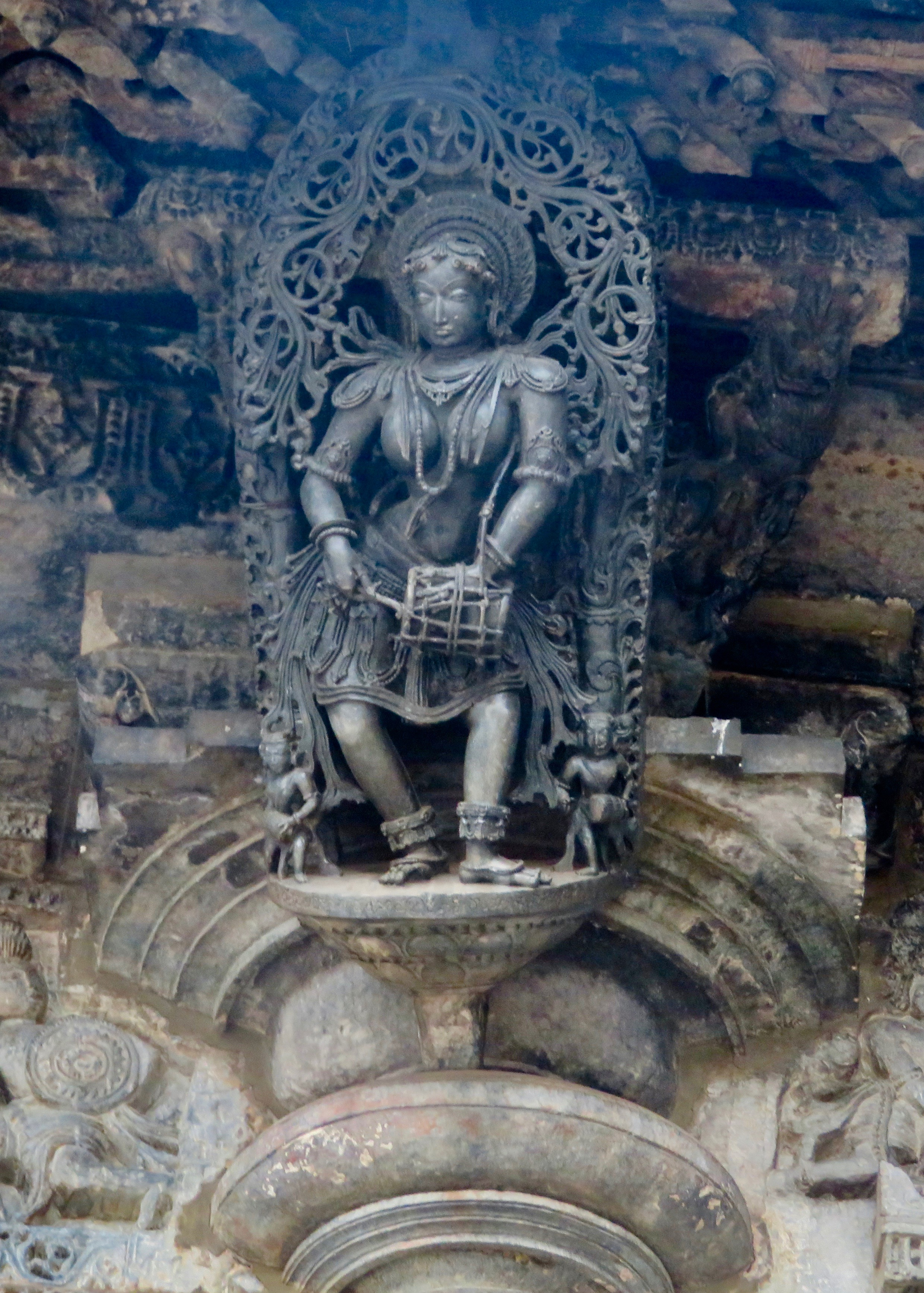
Chennakeshava Temple, 12th century A.D. Goddess playing an hourglass drum, possibly an udukai.

- Chande
- Davul
- Kachhi Dhol
- Nagara – pair of kettledrums
- Pambai – unit of two cylindrical drums
- Parai thappu, halgi – frame drum played with two sticks
- Sambal
- Stick daff or stick duff – daff in a stand played with sticks
- Tamak'
- Tasha – type of kettledrum
- Thavanadai, Davandai
- Timki
- Urumee

== Idiophones ==
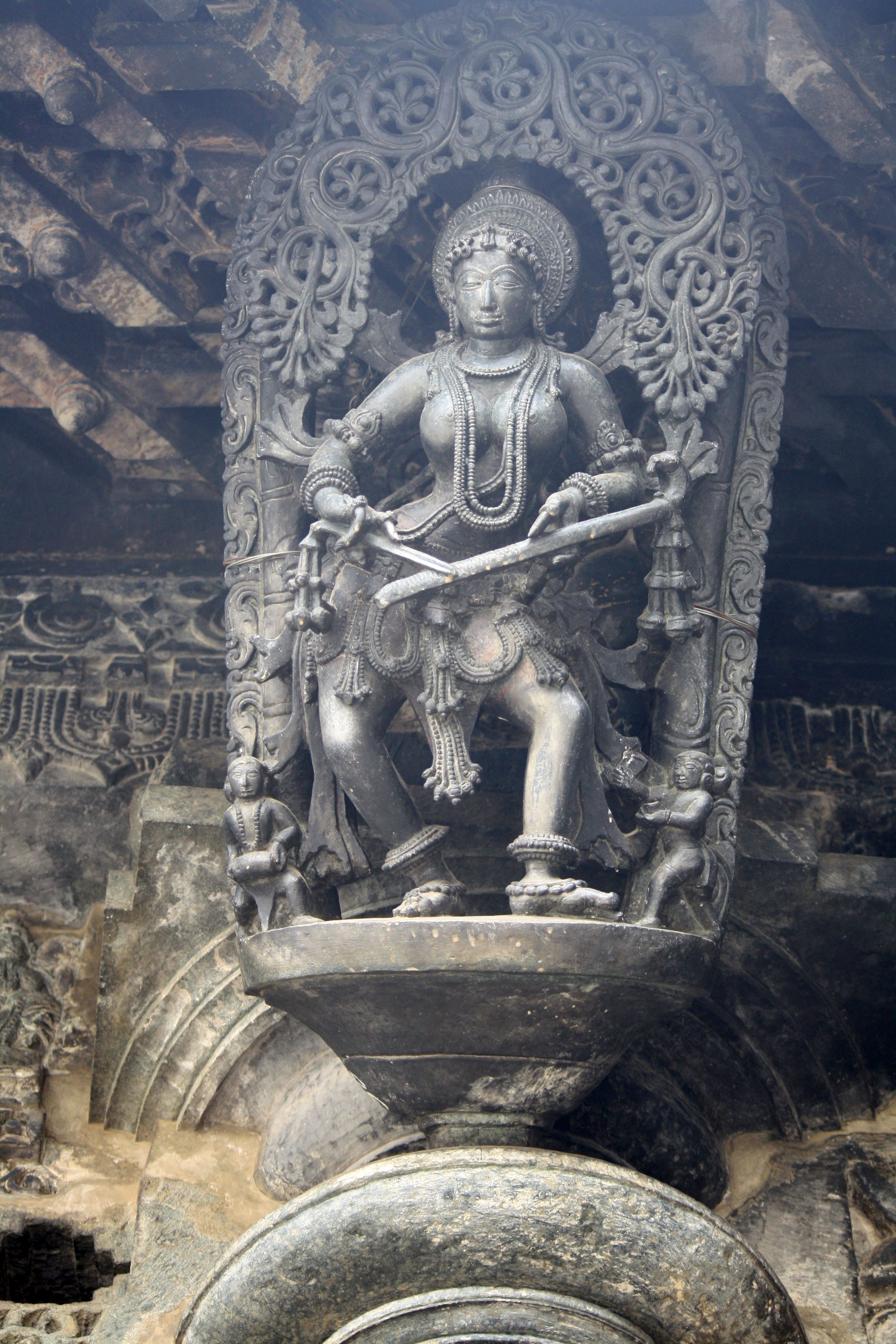
A medieval instrument, labeled nagaveena (snake veena), is a type of musical scraper.

- Chimta – fire tong with brass jingles
- Chengila – metal disc
- Elathalam
- Geger – brass vessel
- Ghanti – Northern Indian bell
- Ghatam and Matkam (Earthenware pot drum)
- Ghungroo
- Khartal or Chiplya
- Manjira or jhanj or taal
- Nut – clay pot
- Sankarjang – lithophone
- Thali – metal plate
- Thattukazhi mannai
- Yakshagana bells

=== Melodic ===
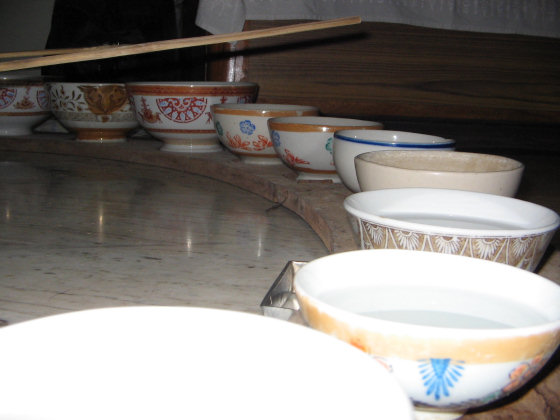
Jaltarang

- Jal tarang, ceramic bowls with water
- Kanch tarang, a type of glass harp
- Loh tarang (लोह तरंग), a set of tuned gongs
- Kashtha tarang, a type of xylophone

== Hand harmonium ==
Dwarkanath Ghose (Dwarkin) modified the French pedal harmonium.

== Electronic ==
- Roland HandSonic
- Electronic tanpura
- Electronic (digital) tabla
- Talameter
- Musical instrument of Tamil nadu
- List of Indian dance
