= Amar Singh Shaunki =

- Born: Amar Singh ਅਮਰ ਸਿੰਘ; 15 August 1916; Bhajjlan, (now Hoshiarpur district), British Punjab
- Died: 14 August 1981 (aged 64)
- Genres: Folk
- Occupations: Singing, Dhadi singer
- Instruments: Dhadd and Sarangi
- Label: His Master's Voice

Amar Singh Shaunki (15 August 1916 – 14 August 1981), also spelled as Amar Singh Shonki, was a Dhadi singer of Punjab, India.

== Early life ==
Shaunki was born as Amar Singh on 15 August 1916, in a Sikh family to father Sardar Moola Singh, in the village of Bhajjlan (now Hoshiarpur district) in British Punjab (British India). He hailed from a farmer family and never went to school but learned Punjabi (Gurmukhi) from the other educated persons. He got married and had three sons, Sawraj Singh, Jaspal Singh and Pargat Singh.

== Career ==
He was very much interested in folk music from his childhood and learned it from Sant Baba Maan Singh of Sialkot. At first he sang under last name Mast but as started singing with Dhadd and Sarangi and made a team with Sarwan Singh and Mohan Singh Binda, he fixed Shaunki as his last name. The main themes of his songs evokes the culture and folk of Punjab. He sang about every color of Punjabi folk. The main themes of his songs were the evergreen folk stories of Punjab like Heer Ranjha, Mirza Sahiban, Sassui Punnhun, Rani Sundran and Pooran Bhagat, heroes of Sikh history likes Hari Singh Nalwa, the Sikh masters and other freedom fighters. He wrote songs on various topics including the four tragic love stories of Punjab, Sikh history like Saka Sirhind and Sikh heroes. Many Punjabi singers today, including Manmohan Waris and Kamal Heer sings songs written by him.

== Discography ==
A well known music company, His Master's Voice, recorded many of his records. There are about 138 phonograph records to his credit.

== Remembering ==
People of his village Bhajjlan organized a fair, Dhadi Amar Singh Shaunki Sabhyacharak Mela, every year in his memory. Punjabi singers from all around the world participate in the fair and pay tribute.

== See also ==
- Babu Rajab Ali
- Karnail Singh Paras
