= Beas Pind =

- village
- Location in Punjab, India Beas Pind (India)
- Coordinates: 31.43°N 75.65°E
- Country: India
- State: Punjab
- District: Jalandhar

Population (2011)
  - Total: 4,203

Languages
  - Official: Punjabi
- Time zone: UTC+5:30 (IST)
- Vehicle registration: PB- 08

Beas Pind (sometimes Bias Pind) is a village in Adampur in Jalandhar district in the north-western Indian state of Punjab. It is the largest village in the Doaba region.

== Demographics ==
As of the 2011 Census of India, the village has a population of 4,203.

== Geography ==
Beas Pind is situated on the Pathankot road, one of the many communities in Adampur Mandal. Beas Pind is approximately 14 kilometres from Jalandhar-West, and 134 kilometres from the state capital, Chandigarh. Nearby villages include Gopalpur (1 km), Jagrawan (1.8 km), Karari, Dolike Sunderpur (2.2 km), Sanghwal (2.6 km), Duhre (3.2 km), and Sikanderpur (4.1 km). Nearby towns include Adampur (6 km) and Bhogpur (12.3 km).

== Notable people ==
- Fauja Singh, British marathon runner
