= Chikara =

Chikara may refer to:

- Chikara (given name)
- Chikara (instrument), a stringed instrument from India
- Chikara-mizu (力水), a ritual at the beginning of a sumo match
- Chikara (album), a 1988 album by Kiss
- Chikara (professional wrestling), a professional wrestling organization

== See also ==
- Chinkara, or Indian gazelles
