= Dhadd =

Musical instrument

Dhadd ਢੱਡ
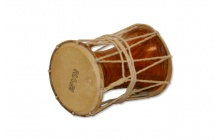
- Dhadd
- Other names: Dhad, Dhadh
- Classification: Percussion instrument

Related instruments
- udukai

Musicians
- Amar Singh Shaunki

Builders
- Mistry Chanan Ram Bilga

More articles or information
- Dhadi (music), Music of Punjab, Babu Rajab Ali, Karnail Singh Paras

Dhadd (Punjabi: ਢੱਡ), also spelled as Dhad or Dhadh is an hourglass-shaped traditional musical instrument native to Punjab that is mainly used by the Dhadi singers. It is also used by other folk singers of the region.

== Design and playing ==
The dhadd is made of wood with thin a waist like an hourglass. The skin on both sides is tightened with ropes that help in holding the instrument firmly together. Its design is very similar to other Indian drums: the simple Damru, the Udukai, and the sophisticated Idakka. The Damru has knotted cords to strike its ends, but the Dhadd lacks such cords. The Damru is played by shaking/rotating quickly so that the knotted cords strike its ends, and is also played with a stick sometimes. The Udukai and the Dhad have similar techniques of playing, but the social significance is different.

Playing

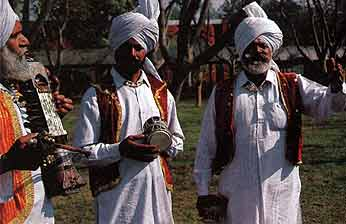
Dhadd being played by an artist in the center

The Dhadd is played by tapping/striking fingers on one of its ends. The pitch of the drum is raised by tightening a small cloth band wrapped around the waist of the drum. Closed and open sounds can also be produced.

== Social significance ==
Dhadd is very closely associated with and mostly used by the Dhadi singers who sing folk, religious and warriors' ballads and history using this along with Sarangi.

== See also ==
- Dhadi (music)
- Music of Punjab
- Tsuzumi - A similar drum used in Japan
