= Kavishari =

- Native name: ਕਵੀਸ਼ਰੀ / کویشری
- Cultural origins: Punjab

Subgenres
- Veer Ras (Heroic); Shant Ras (Soulful); Vairag Ras (Mystic); Haas Ras (Comic)

Other topics
- Music of Punjab

Kavishari or kavishri (Punjabi: ਕਵੀਸ਼ਰੀ (Gurmukhi) / کویشری (Shahmukhi)) is a style of Punjabi folk music entailing energetic and dynamic a cappella singing. It originated in the Malwa region of Punjab as a sung form of "Chhand-Baddh" kavita (poetry).

A performer or writer of kavishari is known as a kavishar. In this style, kavita (poetry) is sung faster in a loud, yet stretched voice without any musical instruments.

Kavishari is usually performed in melas, weddings, diwaans (religious functions), harvest celebrations (i.e. Visakhi), mehfils, etc.

== History ==
Kavishari was started in the Malwa region of Punjab by the 10th Sikh Guru, Guru Gobind Singh Sahib, as a sung form of "Chhand-Baddh" kavita (poetry).

There was a need of a particular singing style or genre that could energize the Sikh soldiers. So the Kavishari was mostly sung about bravery, known as Veer Ras, one of the nine Ras' ('flavour'/'subgenre') of the genre.

The term kavishar is made of two words: kavi means 'singer', and shayar means 'writer' or 'poet'. As such, "kavishar" means 'person who writes and sings (poetry)'.

== Characteristics ==
Kavishari is based on vocal and wording/lyrics. Singing style is its voice, chhand is its body, and the ras ('flavour'/'subgenre') is its soul. Many kind of chhands are used in kavishari. A noted kavishar of Punjab, Babu Rajab Ali, used some rare Chhands like Manohar Bhavani Chhand and gave some new chhands like Bahattar Kala Chhand to kavishari as well as Punjabi literature.

There are nine accepted Rasas (subgenres) of kavishari, out of which the most commonly known four are:

- Veer Ras (Heroic)
- Shant Ras (soulful or peaceful)
- Vairag Ras (mystic)
- Haas Ras (comic)

It was the Veere Ras that is most commonly sung today and specially for the need of which the genre was created.

== Notable kavishars ==
Below are notable kavishars.

Malwa's kavishars include:

- Babu Rajab Ali
- Karnail Singh Paras
- Bhai Maghi Singh Gill (Gill khurd, Bathinda)
- Bhai Bhagwan Singh (Mehraj Wale)
- Gurdev Singh Sahoke
- Kishor Chand (Baddowali)
- Sukhwinder Singh Sutantar (Pakka Kalan)
- Kavishar Harnam Singh (freedom fighter from Ghanauli, Ropar District)

Majha's kavishars include:

- Bapu Bali Singh Gadiwind — known to be the father of the kavishari of Majha
- Gurdial Singh
- P. Mohan Singh
- Jarnail Singh Sabhra
- Jagir Singh Mast — formed the original Jagowala jatha along with Nirmal Singh Chohla, Jarnail Singh, and Sulakhan Singh.
- Joga Singh Jogi — one of the notable kavishars of Majha
  - Gurmukh Singh Johal
  - Dalbir Singh Gill

== See also ==
- Babu Rajab Ali
- Dhadi (music)
- Folk music of Punjab
