= Fauja Singh =

British-Indian marathon runner

Fauja Singh BEM
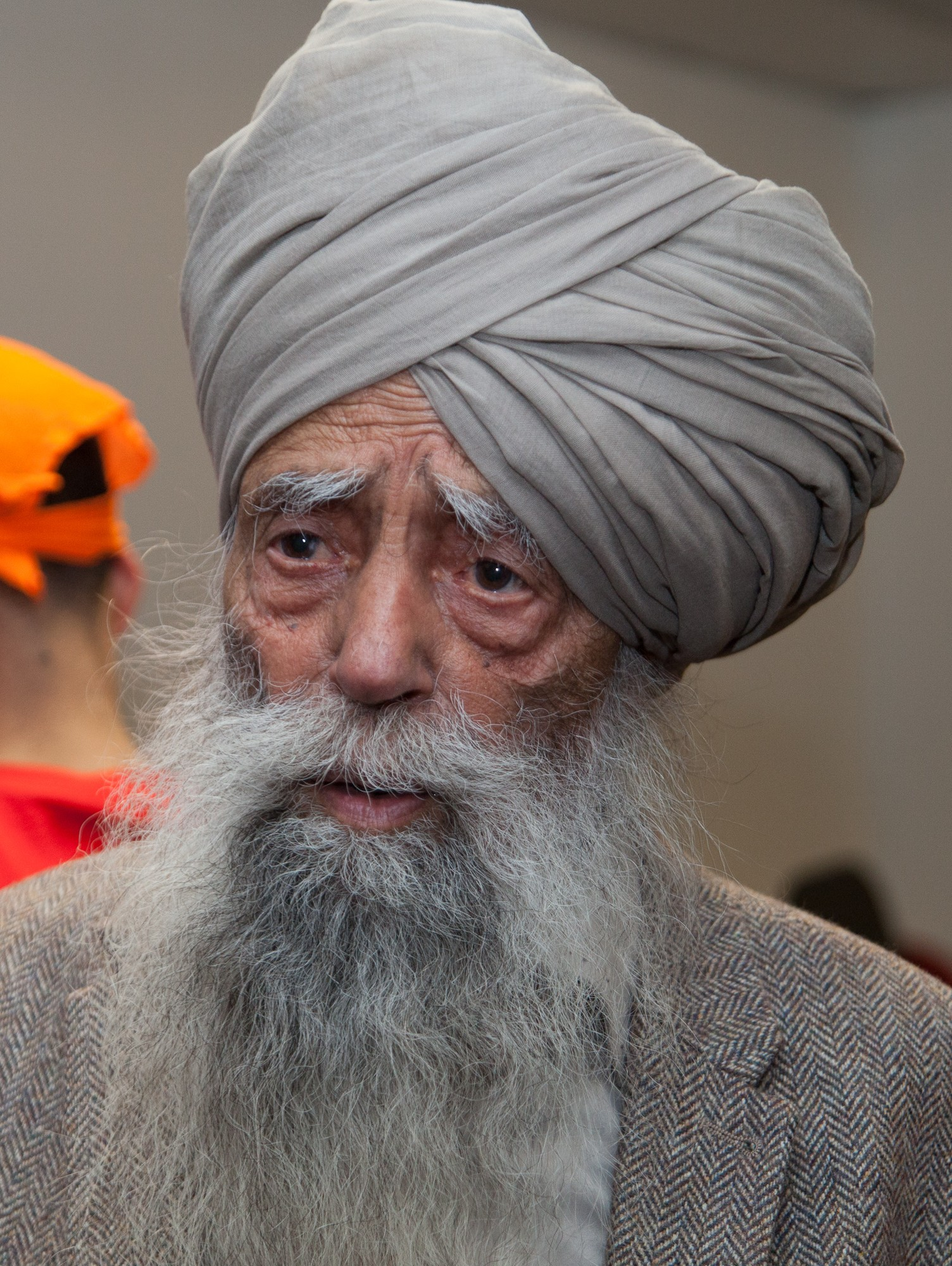
- Singh in 2013

Personal information
- Nicknames: Turbaned Tornado; Running Baba; Sikh Superman
- Nationality: British
- Born: 1 April 1911 (claimed) Beas Pind, Punjab Province, British India
- Died: 14 July 2025 Beas Pind, Punjab, India
- Years active: 2000–2013
- Height: 1.72 m (5 ft 8 in)
- Weight: 53 kg (117 lb)

Sport
- Country: United Kingdom
- Sport: Marathon
- Retired: 24 February 2013
- Updated on 20 April 2023

Fauja Singh (died 14 July 2025) was a British Indian marathon runner. At the time of his birth in Punjab province in British India, birth certificates were not typically issued, so his age could not be verified by third parties. Later in life, he became a marathon runner, participating in marathons all over the world.

He beat a number of world records in multiple age brackets, but none of his times were ratified as records. His personal best time for the London Marathon (2003) was 6:02, and his marathon best, claimed for the 90-plus age bracket, was 5:40 at the claimed age of 92, at the 2003 Toronto Waterfront Marathon. He died in Punjab in 2025, in a hit and run incident.

== Longevity claim ==
At the time of his death in July 2025, Singh was widely reported by international media to be 114 years old, which would have made him the oldest living man in the world and among the oldest men ever. His record was not officially accepted by Guinness World Records, due to the absence of early 20th-century birth documentation.

== Biography ==
=== Early life ===
Fauja Singh Dhindsa claimed to have been born in Beas Pind, Jalandhar, Punjab, British India on 1 April 1911, the youngest of four children. Singh did not walk until he was five years old. His legs were thin and weak, and he could hardly walk long distances. Because of this, he was often teased, and he was called by the nickname "danda" (Punjabi: ਡੰਡਾ for "stick") for the next ten years. As a young man, Singh was an avid amateur runner, but he gave it up at the time of the Partition of India.

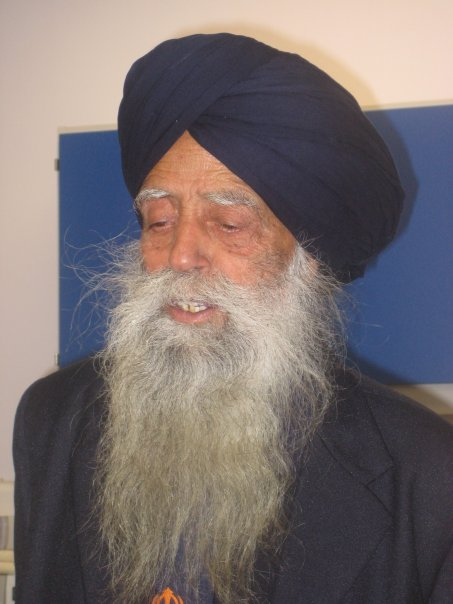
Singh in 2007

=== Return to running as a passion ===
It was only after witnessing the death of his fifth son, Kuldip, in a construction accident in August 1994, that in 1995 Singh returned to his passion for running. The death of his wife in 1992 and his eldest daughter who had died from complications after giving birth to his third granddaughter gave him the determination for this new focus in life. He emigrated to England in the 1990s and lived with one of his sons in Ilford.

At the claimed age of 89, Singh took seriously to running and ended up in international marathon events. When he first turned up for training at Redbridge, Essex, he was dressed in a three-piece suit. The coach had to rework everything, including his attire. Singh ran his first race, the London Marathon, in 2000. According to his coach, he used to run up to 20 kilometres easily and wanted to run a marathon, thinking it to be just 26 kilometres and not 26 miles (42 kilometres). It was after he realised this that he began training seriously.

At the claimed age of 93, Singh completed a marathon in 6:54, 58 minutes quicker than the world best for the 90-plus age bracket. That same year, in 2004, he was featured in an advertising campaign for sportswear manufacturer Adidas alongside David Beckham and Muhammad Ali.

Singh bettered the UK records for the 200 metres, 400 metres, 800 metres, the mile, and the 3000 metres for his claimed age group, all within a single 94-minute period, but they are not currently listed as records.

At the claimed age of 100, Singh attempted and accomplished eight world age group records in one day, at the special Ontario Masters Association Fauja Singh Invitational Meet, held at Birchmount Stadium in Toronto, Ontario, Canada. Timed by officials in Canada, he ran the 100 metres in 23.14, 200 metres in 52.23, the 400 metres in 2:13.48, the 800 metres in 5:32.18, the 1500 metres in 11:27.81, the mile in 11:53.45, the 3000 metres in 24:52.47, and the 5000 metres in 49:57.39, setting five world records for his age group in one day. Some events had no previous record holder, as nobody over age 100 had ever attempted the distance. Some of his marks are significantly superior to the listed world record in the M95 age group as well. Three days later, on 16 October 2011, Singh was claimed to have become the first 100-year-old to finish a marathon, completing the Toronto Waterfront Marathon in 8:11:06. As it took him over 14 minutes after the gun to cross the starting line, the official time submitted, and declined, for the age group record was 8:25:17.

Singh's biography, titled Turbaned Tornado, was formally released in the Attlee Room of Britain's House of Lords on 7 July 2011 by Anthony, Lord Young of Norwood Green and retired British Crown Court judge Sir Mota Singh. The book was written by Chandigarh-based columnist and writer Khushwant Singh.

In October 2011, Singh, a vegetarian, was featured in a PETA campaign.

In 2012, he was a torch bearer carrying the Olympic flame at the 2012 Summer Olympics.

After taking part in the Hong Kong marathon on 24 February 2013, Singh stated that he would retire from competitive running. He completed the 10 kilometre run at the Hong Kong marathon in 1 hour 32 minutes and 28 seconds, Following his retirement, Singh still enjoyed cheering on marathon runners at events.

Singh participated as a special guest for the 2nd Annual Chardikala Run in Malaysia which was given a theme '101 and running' in his honour. He continued to attend such events after his retirement, attending a 5K Chardikala run in 2014.

=== Personal life ===
Singh was 1.72 metres (5 feet 8 inches) tall and weighed 52 kg (115 lb). He attributed his physical fitness and longevity to abstaining from smoking and alcohol and to following a simple vegetarian diet. He was quoted as saying "I am very careful about different foods. My diet is simple phulka, dal, green vegetables, yogurt and milk. I do not touch parathas, pakoras, rice or any other fried food. I take lots of water and tea with ginger. ... I go to bed early taking the name of my Rabba (God) as I don't want all those negative thoughts crossing my mind."

Speaking about the marathon, he said: "The first 20 miles are not difficult. As for last six miles, I run while talking to God."

==== Death ====
Fauja Singh died on 14 July 2025, after being hit by an SUV whilst crossing a road at his native village of Beas Pind in Punjab on his way to cross the street to a roadside dhaba called Kuldeep dhaba in memory of his son. The driver was later arrested for failing to stop and assist Singh or take him to a hospital. The police are treating it as a hit-and-run crime. The man charged is a 26-year-old Canada-based man, who had a work permit there until 2027.

== Sikhs in the City ==
Singh was the eldest of a group of Sikhs who call themselves "Sikhs in the City". There were three other Sikhs, aged 79, 79, and 80, in the "Golden Oldies" team which ran the Edinburgh Marathon relay in 2009. The SITC running group are a now a well-established team based in East London, running marathons across the world with interfaith groups and raising money for Fauja Singh's charities.

== Controversies ==
=== Punjab elections 2012 ===
Singh attended an election rally at village of Kukranwala under the Raja Sansi constituency (near Amritsar) for the People's Party of Punjab candidate, where he was reported to have extended his support for the party. However, the party was criticised by Sikhs in the City for the "misuse of Fauja Singh for political purposes", and for having "abused the vulnerability of an old man for its own ends".

=== Age verification ===
Guinness World Records refused to include Singh in its record book because he could not produce his birth certificate to prove his age. Birth certificates were not typically issued in villages in India at the time, and Singh attempted to prove his age with his British passport, which listed his date of birth as 1 April 1911.

== Awards ==
On 13 November 2003, Singh was awarded the Ellis Island Medal of Honor by the National Ethnic Coalition, a U.S. group that advocates ethnic pride and tolerance. William Fugazy, the chairman of the coalition, said Singh is a symbol of racial tolerance, and his running helps bridge the gap created by the 11 September terrorist attacks. "He is the greatest inspiration," said Fugazy, and added that Singh was the first non-American to receive the honour.

He was awarded the "Pride of India" title by a UK-based organisation for his achievements in 2011.

In July 2012, Singh carried the Olympic torch.

Singh was awarded the British Empire Medal (BEM) in the 2015 New Year Honours for services to sport and charity.

== Achievements ==
- Marathons run: London (6), Toronto (2), New York (1)
- London Marathon 2000: 6:54
- London Marathon 2001: 6:54
- London Marathon 2002: 6:45
- London Marathon 2003: 6:02
- Toronto Waterfront Marathon 2003: 5:40
- New York City Marathon 2003: 7:35
- London Marathon 2004: 6:07
- Glasgow City Half Marathon 2004: 2:33
- Toronto Waterfront Half Marathon 2004: 2:29:59
- Toronto Waterfront Marathon 2011: 8:11:0
- London Marathon 2012 : 7:49:21
- Hong Kong Marathon (10 km) 2012: 1:34 (raised $25,800 for charity)
- UK Parkrun 2012 – Age graded record holder: 179.04% with a time of 38:34
- Hong Kong Marathon (10 km) 2013: 1:32:28

== See also ==
- Dharampal Singh Gudha, who ran competitively at a claimed age of 119
