= Triveni veena =

Plucked string musical instrument

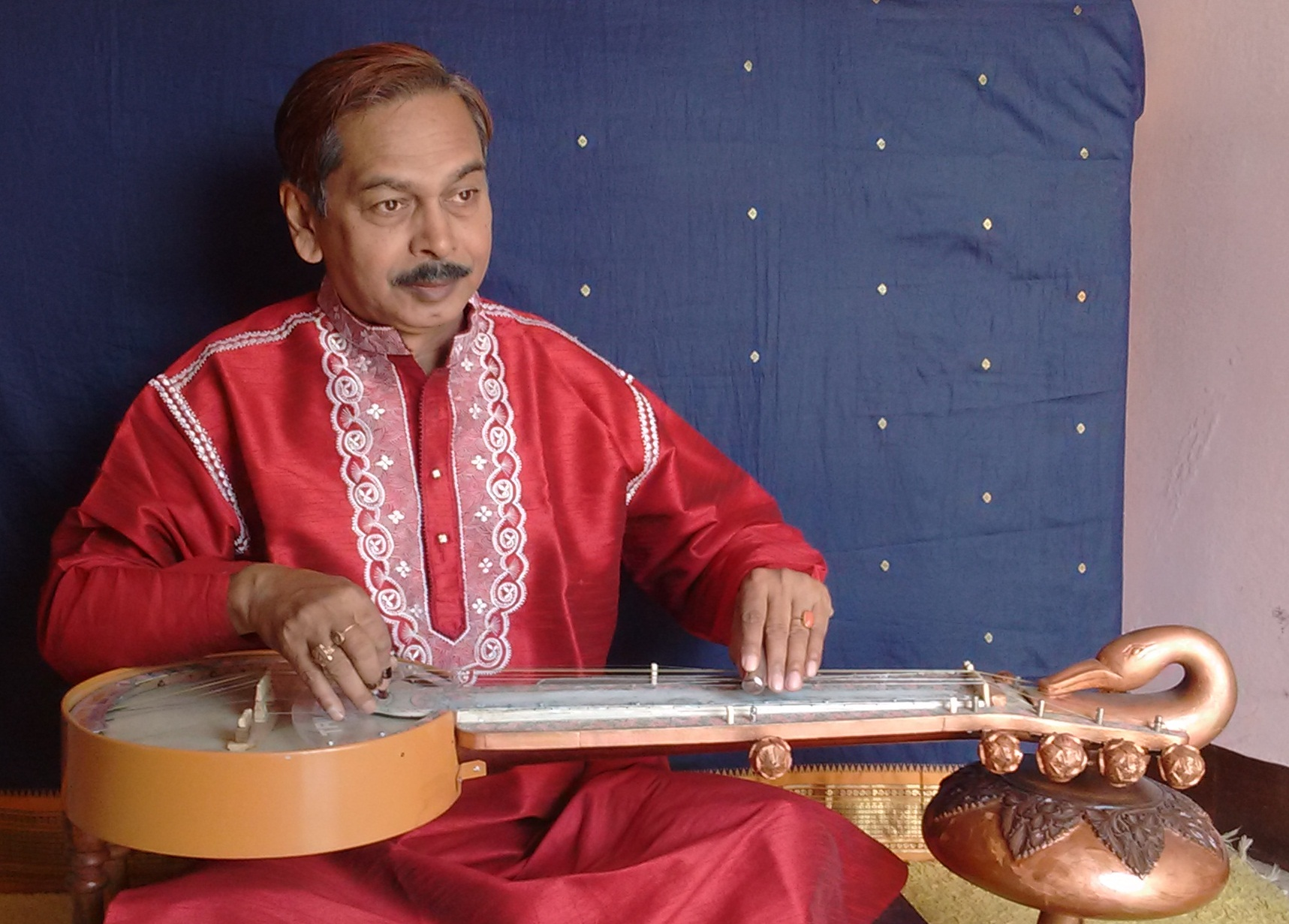
Triveni Veena by Pandit Niranjan Haldar

Triveni Veena is a plucked string musical instrument invented and patented by Pandit Niranjan Haldar along with Pandit Kamal Kamle. Pandit Niranjan Haldar is a retired senior Grade-A artist from All India Radio (Indore MP - India). He has more than 40 years of experience in Indian and Western classical music. He has presented Vichitra Veena and Guitar at various concerts and several events for Akashvani, Doordarshan and Sangeet Natak Akademi.

After inventing Ranjan Veena he researched with various instruments to come up with a unique instrument. It was named Triveni Veena, (Triveni meaning three rivers[2]) because it combines 3 materials (metal, wood and leather) and produces mixed tone of 3 instruments (Sarod, Veena and Guitar). There are 4 melody strings, 2(right) + 4(left) Chikari strings to maintain Scale with Rhythm and 11 sympathetic strings. It is medium in size but produces a loud sound with long sustenance and sweet tone. It is played using a steel slide just like Hawaiian Guitar. On the Triveni Veena, an experienced musician, can play all the Indian Classical Instrumental techniques –Meed (Slide) Gamak, Krintan, Gitkari etc. and the fast Taans too.
