= Karnail Singh Paras =

Background information
- Also known as: Karnail Singh Paras Ramuwalia
- Born: ramuwala nawan 28 June 1916; Mehraj, Firozpur district (now Bathinda district), British Punjab
- Origin: Jagrawan, East Punjab
- Died: 28 February 2009 (aged 92) Ramuwala, Moga district, Punjab, India
- Genres: Folk, Kavishari
- Occupations: Singer, Kavishar

Karnail Singh Paras (28 June 1916 – 28 February 2009) was an Indian Kavishar from Punjab, India. He is the father of former union minister and Samajwadi Party politician Balwant Singh Ramoowalia and Canada based writer Iqbal Singh Ramoowalia. One of his granddaughters is married to singer and actor Harbhajan Maan.

== Early life ==
Paras was born as Karnail Singh on 28 June 1916, to father Tara Singh of Ramoowala village and mother Ram Kaur, in his maternal grandparents' village of Mehraj of Firozpur district (now Bathinda district) in British Punjab. His father died when he was only 14. He was sent to a dera for the study of Gurbani where his teacher noticed his intelligence and called him, Paras, that was fixed for ever as his last name. He was very fond of singing from his childhood. In 1938 he married Daljit Kaur of village Boparai. The couple has 6 children; 4 sons and 2 daughters.

== Career ==
Paras was inspired by Kavishar Mohan Singh Rode. After the performance of Mohan Singh at Mela Maghi at Sri Muktsar Sahib, Paras met and told him about his love for singing and also recited a poem of his own. Being happy on listening to the poem, Mohan Singh took him as his student. Paras joined his team and learned singing/Kavishari from Mohan Singh. Paras' first performance on stage was at Roshnian Da Mela at Jagrawan. His first performance on All India Radio, Jalandhar, in 1954, made him popular. He also performed in Canada, England and the United States. Bhasha Vibhag Punjab honored him with Sharomani Kavishar Award in 1980–81.&6 He has about 20 students but Gursewak Maan and Harbhajan Maan, the well known Punjabi singers today, are the shining stars of them. His relationship with Harbhajan Maan got closer as one of his granddaughters, Harmandeep Kaur, is married to Harbhajan Maan. He also wrote songs for Maan brothers. Harbhajan Maan's first album, Ishq De Mamle featured 7 songs written by Paras.

== Discography ==
After his first performance on All India Radio Jalandhar, in 1954, he got high popularity and His Master's Voice recorded his first record featuring the Kavisharis, Kyon Pharhi Sipahian Ne, Bhaino Eh Hansaa Di Jorhi and Hai Aaun-Jaan Bania, Dunia Chahun Ku Dina Da Mela. After that he recorded about 20 records.

== See also ==
- Kavishari
- Kali (chhand)
- Babu Rajab Ali
- Harbhajan Maan
- Dhadi (music)
- Punjabi folk music
