= Udukai =

Musical instrument

Udukkai
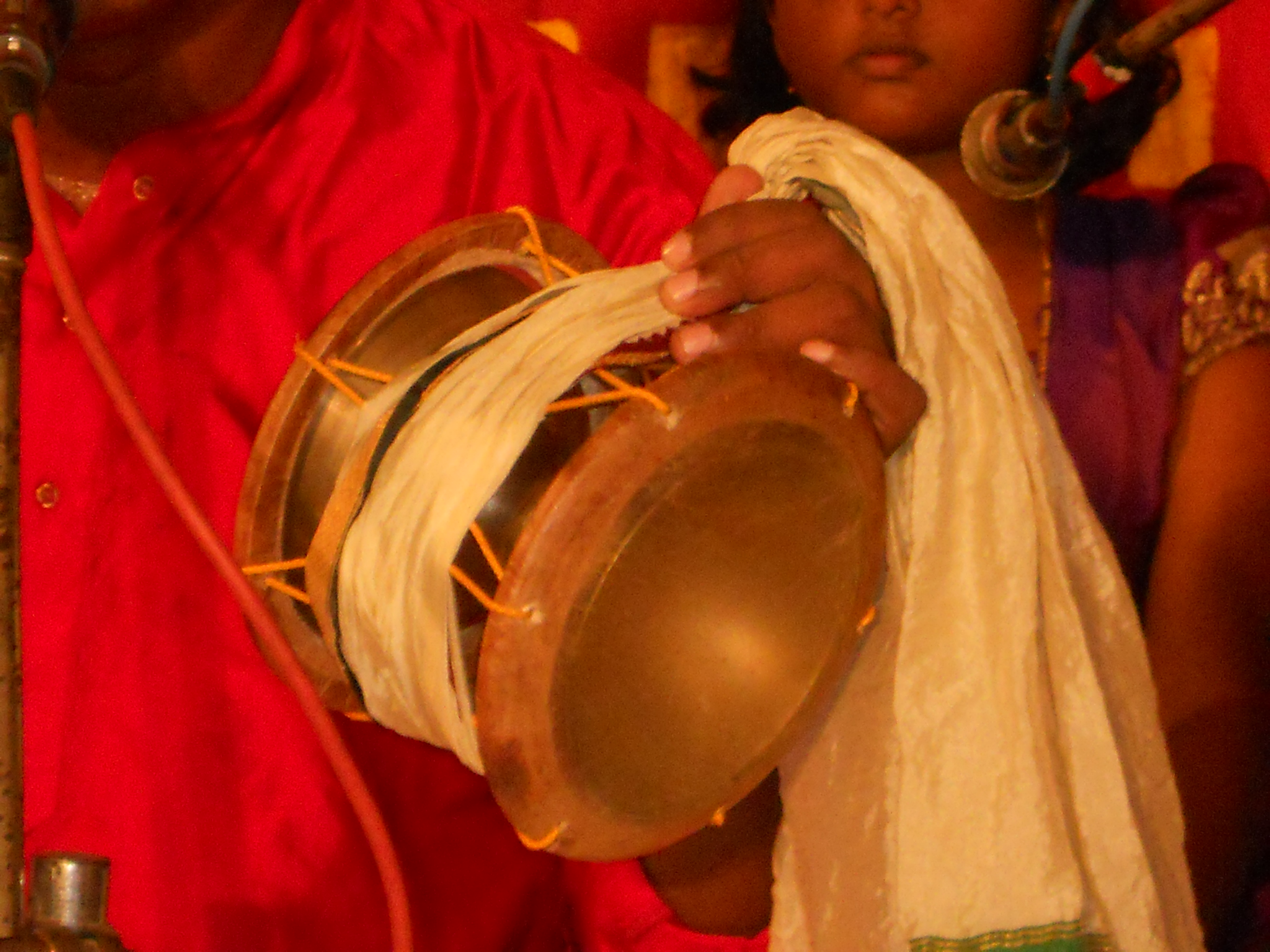
- Classification: Percussion instrument, goatskin heads

Playing range
- Bolt tuned or rope tuned with dowels and hammer

Related instruments
- damaru, idakka, dhad

The udukku , udukai or udukkai (Tamil: உடுக்கை) is a member of the family of membranophone percussion instruments of India and Nepal used in folk music and prayers in Tamil Nadu.

The drums are an ancient design of hourglass drums similar to the northern damaru and southern idakka. Its shape is similar to other Indian hourglass drums, having a small snare stretched over one side. They are played with the bare hand, and the pitch may be tered by squeezing the lacing in the middle. It is made of wood or brass and is very portable. It originated in Tamil Nadu as well. Other members in the family include thehuruk, hurkî, hurko, hudko or hudka, utukkai.

Another non-hourglass drum that is also referred to as udukkai is the damru (while in the hands of Shiva).

== Hudukkâ ==
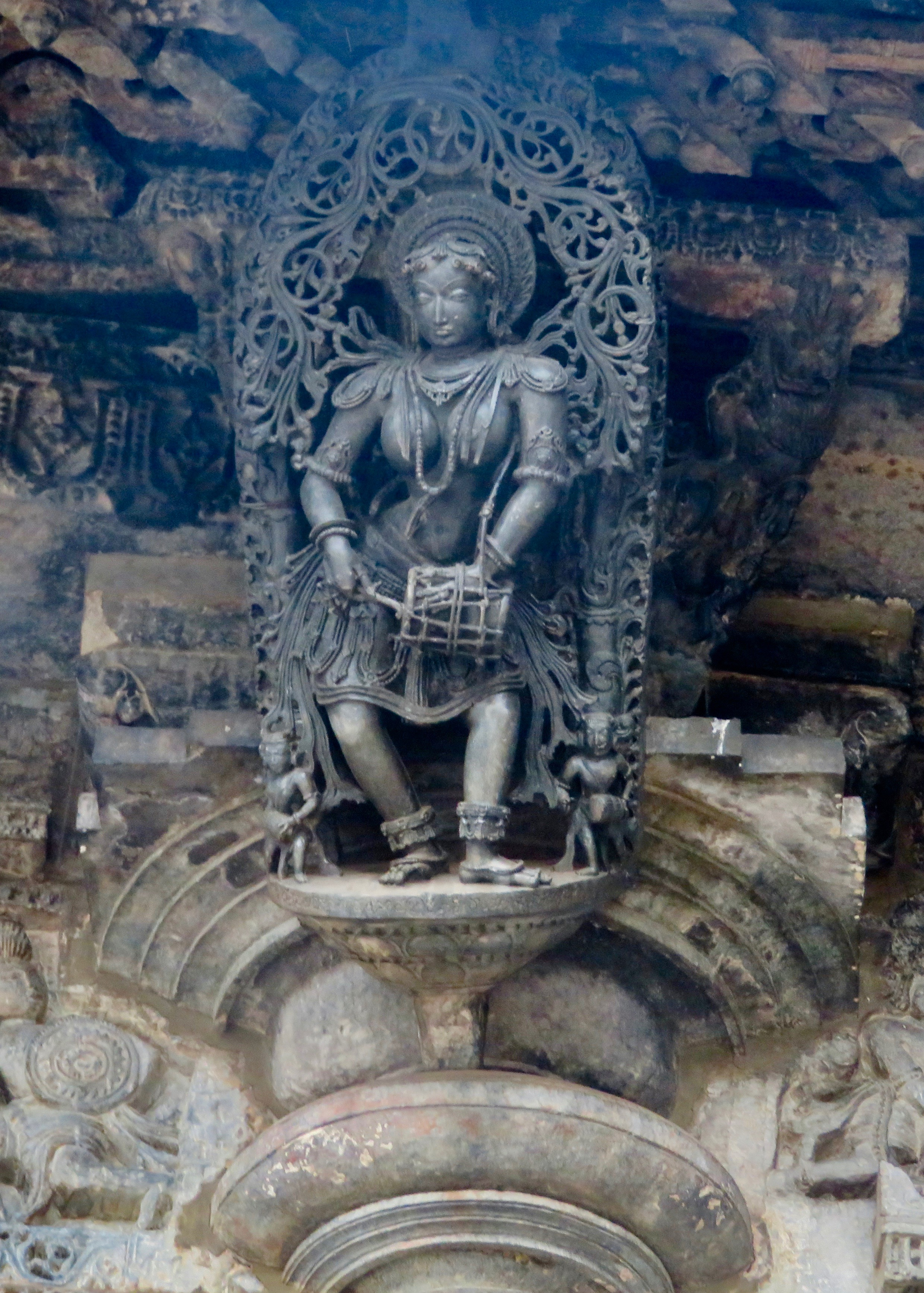
Chennakeshava Temple, 12th century A.D. Goddess playing an hourglass drum.

Known from xiii th century, this is a drum barrel converted hourglass by adding membranes wide overhanging ends. The kuddukâ is similar but does not grelotet is played with the stick. It is still used in ritual Kerala music by the Marârs caste and forms of folk dances. Given its small size, it also accompanies traveling musicians. These drums are characterized by a modifiable tension of the pitch of the sound during the play and thus have a melodic vocation as much as rhythmic.

Characteristics

48 cm long and 18 cm in diameter, the body of the instrument is carved from wood. The cow or goat skin membranes are glued to a thick (2 cm) ring (22 cm in diameter) in vegetable fiber pierced with six holes through which a cotton tension cord passes, also allowing the membrane to be held in place by lacing in W. Bells are attached to the lacing.

Playing

This armpit drum is suspended by means of a strap from the percussionist's left shoulder. The right hand strikes the skin while the left hand ensures the variations in tension by tightening the central part of the rope covered with a wide cotton strip.

== Huruk ==
Known since the xvi th century in northern India. It receives various names: hurki (Uttar Pradesh), dâk or deru (Rajasthan), daklû (Gujarat) and guruki (Maharashtra).

Characteristics

It is 25 cm long with 15 cm diameter goat membranes attached to a bamboo or fig tree ring protruding from the body of the instrument. They are held in place by a Y-shaped cotton lacing passing through six holes. At the junction of the inverted cones, a shoulder strap is attached.

Playing

The left hand grasps the lacing and holds the instrument while only the right strikes it on the only front face. The instrument accompanies the karkâ (martial ballad of Rajasthan and Punjab) and folk dances.

== Hudko ==
It is found as much in northern India as in Nepal. Played at festivals by Damai musicians from the far western Nepali Seti Zone, Mahakali Zone and Kamali Zone to accompany recitation of the Mahabharata and folk songs and ceremonies, such as worship, marriage and fasting. Festivals include Nwaran and Bratabandha (व्रतबन्ध).

=== Characteristics ===
The two headed drum made from wood and copper is 30 cm long body x 20 cm diameter at drumheads, with a narrow waist. It is hollowed out on the lathe; metal sometimes replaces wood. The tightened part houses a small hole allowing the "breathing" of the instrument. The goatskin membranes are attached to rings laced with a cord providing variable tension.

=== Playing ===
It is worn over the shoulder and played by the untouchables. It is again the left hand which holds the instrument by grasping it at the central part while varying the tension and therefore the pitch of the sound, while the right strikes the only playing side. It accompanies folk dances but also jâgar shamanic rituals.

== Udukku ==
The udukku (Kerala) and utukkai (Tamil Nadu) resemble Huruk . They also receive other names: studied, idaisurangu decked and davandai (larger and thicker, played to the stick).

Characteristics

The body is sometimes made of copper or terracotta. They also have a metal or plant or animal fiber stamp under the left membrane ensuring a specific buzz .

Playing

It is performed in the temples during rituals where it sometimes replaces the idakka . It also accompanies the songs of viladichanpate harvests .

== See also ==
- Udukku
