= Chikara (given name) =

Chikara (力 or 主税) is a Japanese masculine given name. When written in most forms of kanji, the name means strength, power, authority and other similar variations. Notable people with the name include:

- Chikara Akutsu (阿久津 主税; born 1982), Japanese professional shogi player
- Chikara Mizuhata, Japanese racing driver, see 2010 D1 Grand Prix series
- Chikara Nakashita, Japanese swimmer, competed at the 1997 Summer Universiade
- Chikara Sakaguchi (坂口 力; born 1934), Japanese politician
- Chikara Tanabe (田南部 力; born 1975), Japanese wrestler

== Fictional characters ==
- Chikara Ennoshita (縁下 力), from the manga and anime Haikyu!!
- Chikara Shigeno (重野 力), from the manga and anime Undead Unluck
- Chikara, from the animated film Scooby-Doo! and Kiss: Rock and Roll Mystery
- Colonel Chikara, a fictional villain in the 1993 Indian film Waqt Hamara Hai, played by Rami Reddy

Chikara in Apache means Spirit of the Eagle, a noble, graceful bird who can see for miles. A free spirit.
