= Udukku =

Traditional percussion instrument prevalent in southern India and Sri Lanka

- Udukku (Udukkai)
- Classification: Percussion

Related instruments
- Damaru; Edakka

The Udukku, also known as Udukkai, is an Indian traditional percussion instrument of South Indian, popular in Kerala, Tamil Nadu and north and east parts of Sri Lanka. It is similar to Damaru and Edakka, larger than the former but smaller than the latter.

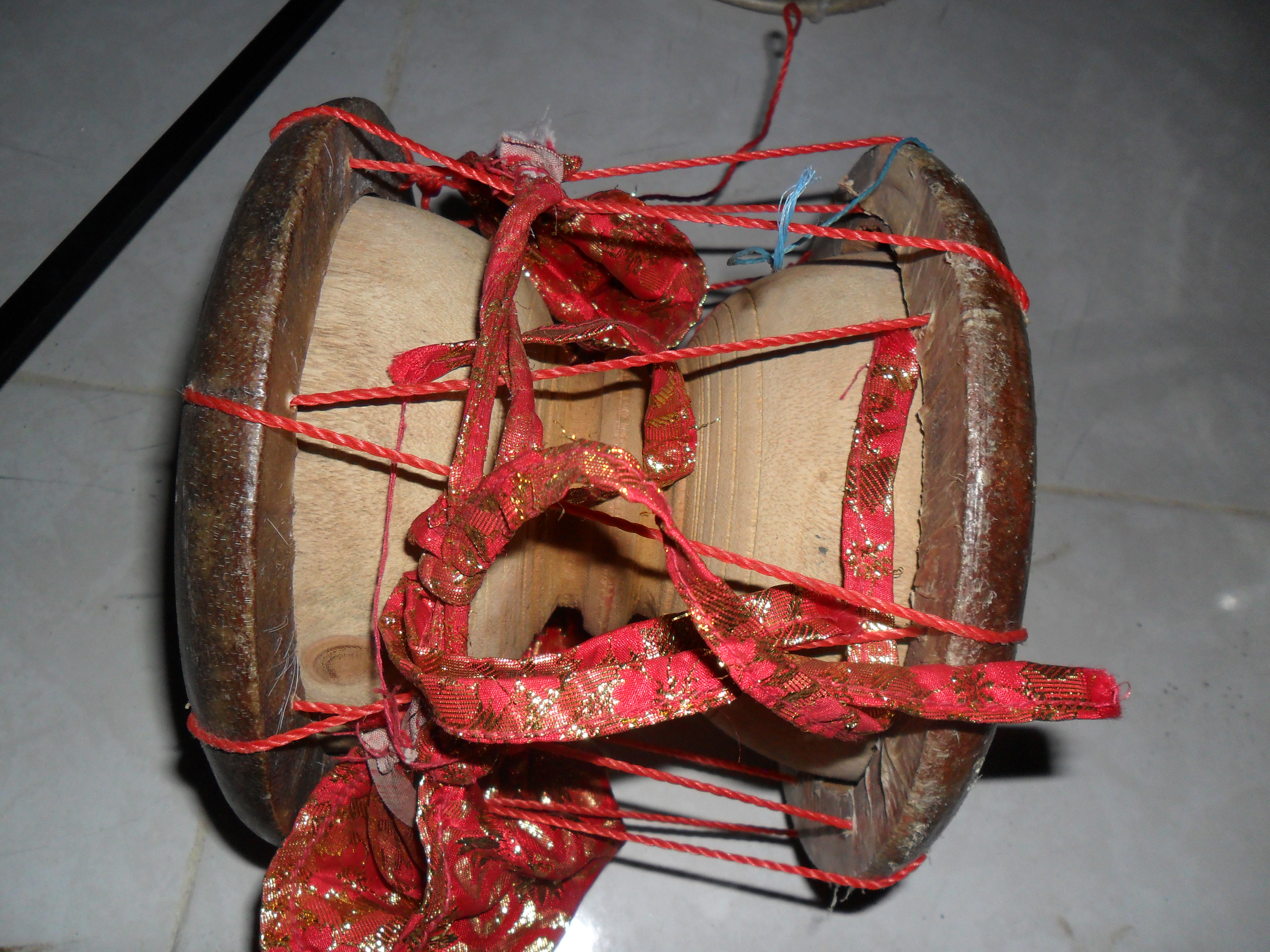
An Udukku

== Etymology ==
The Malayalam name udukku or the Tamil Name Udukkai is originated from the Sanskrit word हुडुक्कः (Hudukkaḥ). In Sanskrit, a hudukkaḥ is described as a double drum which makes huḍuk sound. हुडुक् इति शब्देन कायति शब्दायते इति (huḍhk iti śabdēna kāyati śabdāyatē īti).

== Profile ==
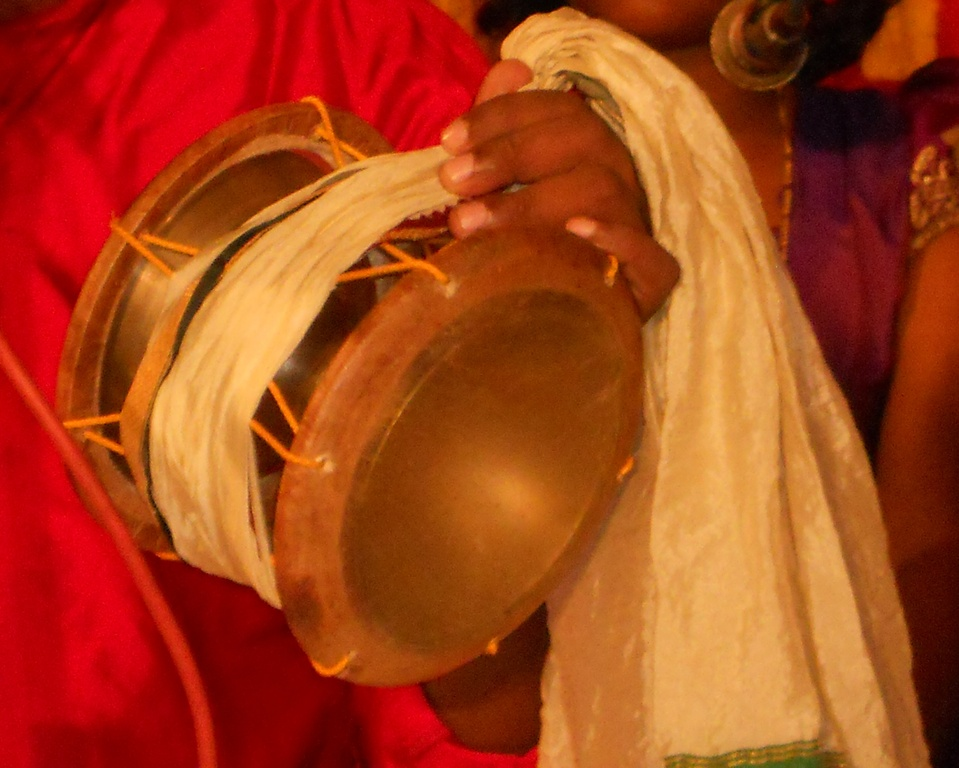
Udukku

Udukku is a smaller version of Edakka, shaped like an hour glass. The instrument is about 8 to 10 inches long with a girth of 6 to 8 inches on both ends and tapering towards the centre. The body of the instrument is traditionally made out of kiln fired clay but later variants are made of wood, preferably from a single hollow block of Jackfruit wood. Brass bodies are also used in some parts. The ends of the instrument is covered across the mouth with cured and dried animal hide, goat skin is the preferred leather. Hoops are placed on the edge of the instrument body and the skin is tightened using strings woven from end to end. Udukku is played on one side and the non playing side is provided with one or two metallic wire snares, enabling the player to generate more resonance. A strap made of cloth is fixed to the middle of the instrument for clasping it. Coloured balls made of cotton strings are also placed hanging from the instrument as an embellishment.

Udukku is commonly played as the percussion accompaniment in temple rituals or in folk culture. The Ayyappan Pattu performed at Sabarimala temple in Kerala to propitiate Lord Ayyappa, uses Udukku as the percussion accompaniment and is often called Udukku Pattu. Udukku Kotti Pattu, is a traditional art form of Kerala where the vocal rendition of the song is accompanied by the Udukku rhythms. It has been reported that Udukku was popular in Jafna, Sri Lanka even during the 9th century AD.

== Playing style ==
Udukku is played holding it horizontally, only on one side, generally the right side, while the left hand is used to clasp the instrument with the cloth strap. The fingers, mainly index, middle and ring fingers, along with the inner palm are used for playing and the cloth strap is squeezed or released to adjust the tightness of the leather to attain pitch modulation. Fingers of the left hand are also used to adjust the tightness by pulling the strings directly.

== Well-known performers ==
- Kaliyamoorthy Poosari
- Karivelil Radhakrishnan

== See also ==
- Damaru
- Edakka
- Udukai
