= Tamate =

Tamate drum-beating at a funeral in Bengaluru, India.

The Tamate, also known as the Tamte, is a hand drum from the southern Indian state of Karnataka, from the Old Mysore region. It is made of goat hide stretched over a circular frame bound with an iron ring, similar to the Parai. This drum was once only played by the all peoples, the Holeyas and Madigas, at times of funeral, village festivals and announcements. Nowadays, it has gained acceptance and become part of weddings, protest rallies, and public awareness campaigns and is an instrument learned by all communities. Troupes exist all around the old Mysore region.
