= Tritantri veena =

Tritantri or Tritantrika vina/veena can refer to two different instruments:

A medieval stick zither with 3 strings.

As a term for small practice sitar malaproped in the 19th century by Raja Sir Surindo Mohun Tagore from Calcutta (1840-1914)

This small practice sitar was built from a single piece of wood, about 100 cm long. It had a small resonator, about 20 cm in diameter, carved of the same log. The neck was topped with 16 metal frets set in wax on wooden tracks, and a tuning box with three pegs.
