= Panchamukha vadyam =

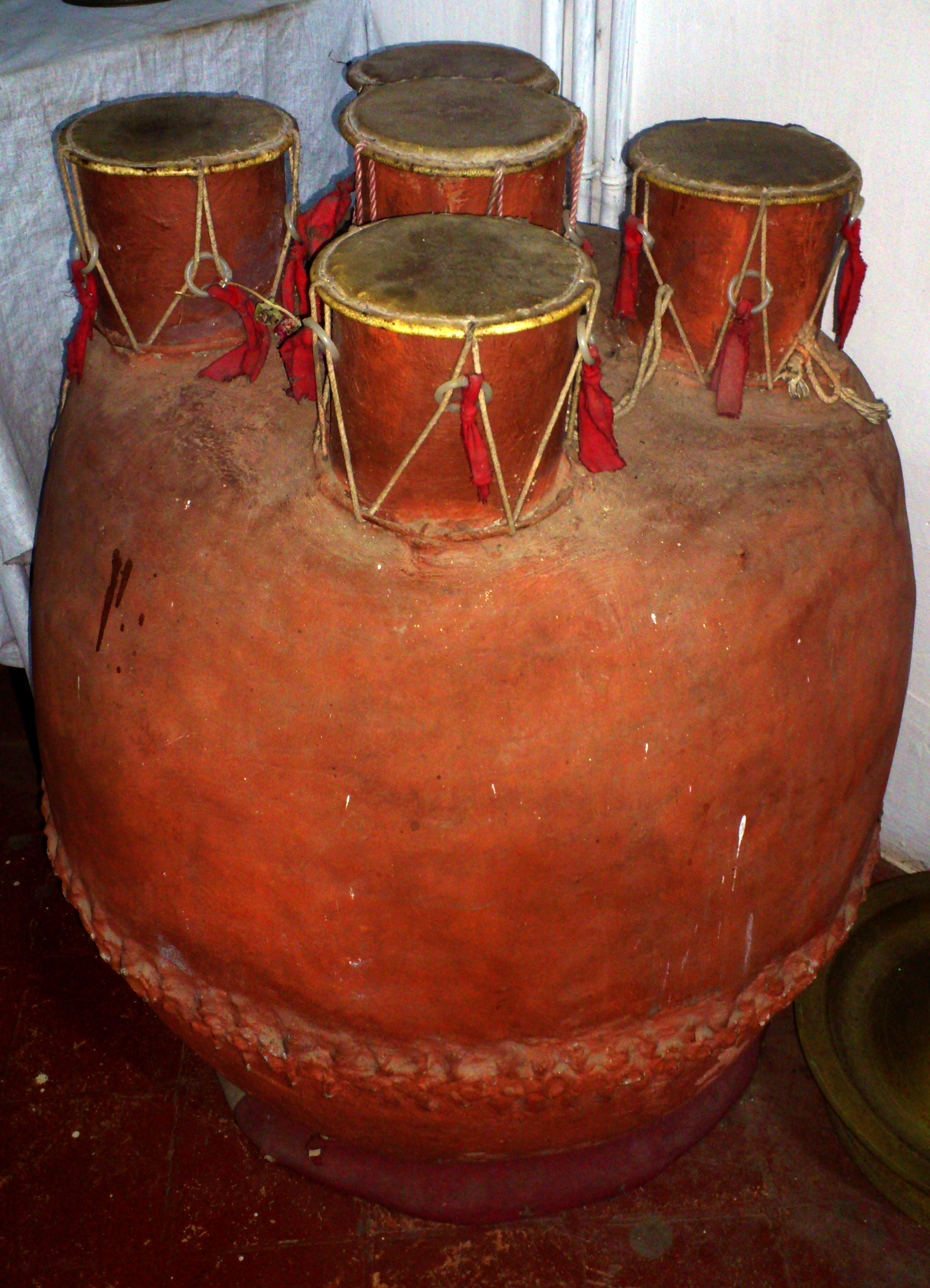
Panchamukha Vadyam

The Panchamukha Vadyam ((Malayalam: പഞ്ചമുഖ വാദ്യം, Telugu: పంచముఖ వాద్యం), Tamil: பஞ்சமுக வாத்தியம்) or Kudamuzha is a drum from India. It is a metal drum with five faces (mukha), named after the faces of Siva: Sadyojatam, Isanam, Tatpurusham, Aghoram and Vamadevam. The diameter of the central face is at a slightly larger than those of the peripheral faces. The instrument is played with both hands. The pitch of the faces is adjusted by tightening or loosening the squeeze of the skin at the region of the neck and below the rim. It is used in temple music.
