= Babu Rajab Ali =

Punjabi singer (1894–1979)

- بابو رجب علی
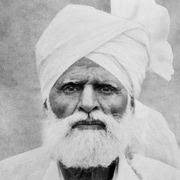
- Babu Rajab Ali
- Born: Rajab Ali Khan رجب علی خان; 10 August 1894; Sahoke, Firozpur district, Punjab, British India (present-day Moga district, Punjab, India)
- Died: 6 June 1979 (aged 84); 32 Chak, Okara district, Punjab, Pakistan
- Other names: Babu Ji, Babu Rajab Ali
- Occupations: Singer, Kavishar

Babu Rajab Ali (Punjabi: بابو رجب على; also known as Babu Ji) was a noted kavishar singer of Punjab, known as the King of Kavishari.

== Kavishar and kavishari ==
Kavishari, or Kavishri, was originated in the Malwa region of Punjab. In the region a "Chhand-Baddh" kavita (poetry) is sung faster in a loud yet stretched voice without any musical instruments known as kavishari.

== Biography ==
Babu Rajab Ali was born as Rajab Ali Khan on 10 August 1894 in a Muslim Rajput family to father Mian Dhamaali Khan and mother Jiooni in the village of Sahoke of Firozpur district (now Moga district) in Punjab Province (British India). He had four sisters and one younger brother. His uncle Haji Ratan was a talented Kavishar as well.

He had his primary schooling from a neighbouring village of Banbiha, then high schooling in Moga and passed matriculation in 1912 from Barjindra High School, Faridkot. He was a good athlete and football player. He was the captain of the cricket team of his school. Later on he graduated with diploma in civil engineering, commonly known as Overseeri in Punjab those days, from an engineering school in Gujrat district. He worked as an overseer in Irrigation department. His first appointment as an Overseer was in Peshawar Tehsil (Pakistan).He also worked as an Overseer in village Akhara, Tehsil Jagraon (Ludhiana) at Canal Rest House Akhara (ref: an article by Labh Singh Sandhu in the leading newspaper "Punjabi Tribune" on 10 August 2012). Later he Worked for a long period in Bathinda. He stayed at Canal rest house Village Teona, Bathinda. He did most of his literary works while his stay at Bathinda. His poetry of Bathinda villages is particularly very famous.

He was married to Bhago Begum, Rehmat Bibi, Fatima and Daulat Bibi and had – four sons Akaal Khan, Shamsher Khan, Adaalat Khan & Ali Sardar and two daughters Shamshad Begum & Gulzar Begum.

In 1947, after the Partition of India, he migrated to Pakistan.

He died on 6 June 1979.

== Poems and literary work ==
Although, he was fluent in Punjabi and Urdu and knew some of Persian, Arabic and English, his poetry only in Punjabi expressing his love for Punjab and Punjabi. His love for Punjab and Punjabi was unconditional and was not bound by walls of religion or nationality.

He wrote about one dozen Qissas and poems about the Hindu mythology like Ramayana, Puran Bhagat and Kaulan, Muslim heroes and historic figures like Muhammad, Hassan, Hussain and Dahood Badshah, and Sikh history.

He wrote an episode or long poem about every know Punjabi folklore like Heer Ranjha, Mirza Sahiban, Dulla Bhatti and Sohni Mahiwal. He had many students who learnt from him and still sings his poetry including hundreds of other Kavishars in Punjab.

He gave some new Chhands like Bahattar Kala Chhand to Punjabi literature. 2000 poems on Sikhism

== Books of Babu Ji ==
Kavishar Sukhwinder Singh (Pakka Kalan) has published many books on Babu Ji through Sangam Publication, Samana. Some of them are :-

- Albela Rajab Ali
- Anmol Rajab Ali
- Ankhila Rajab Ali
- Anokha Rajab Ali
- Babu Rajab Ali De Kisse
- Dasmesh Mahima
- Rangila Rajab Ali

== See also ==
- Kali (chhand)
- Karnail Singh Paras
- Kuldeep Manak
- Music of Punjab
- Punjabi folk music
