= Chikara (instrument) =

Instrument

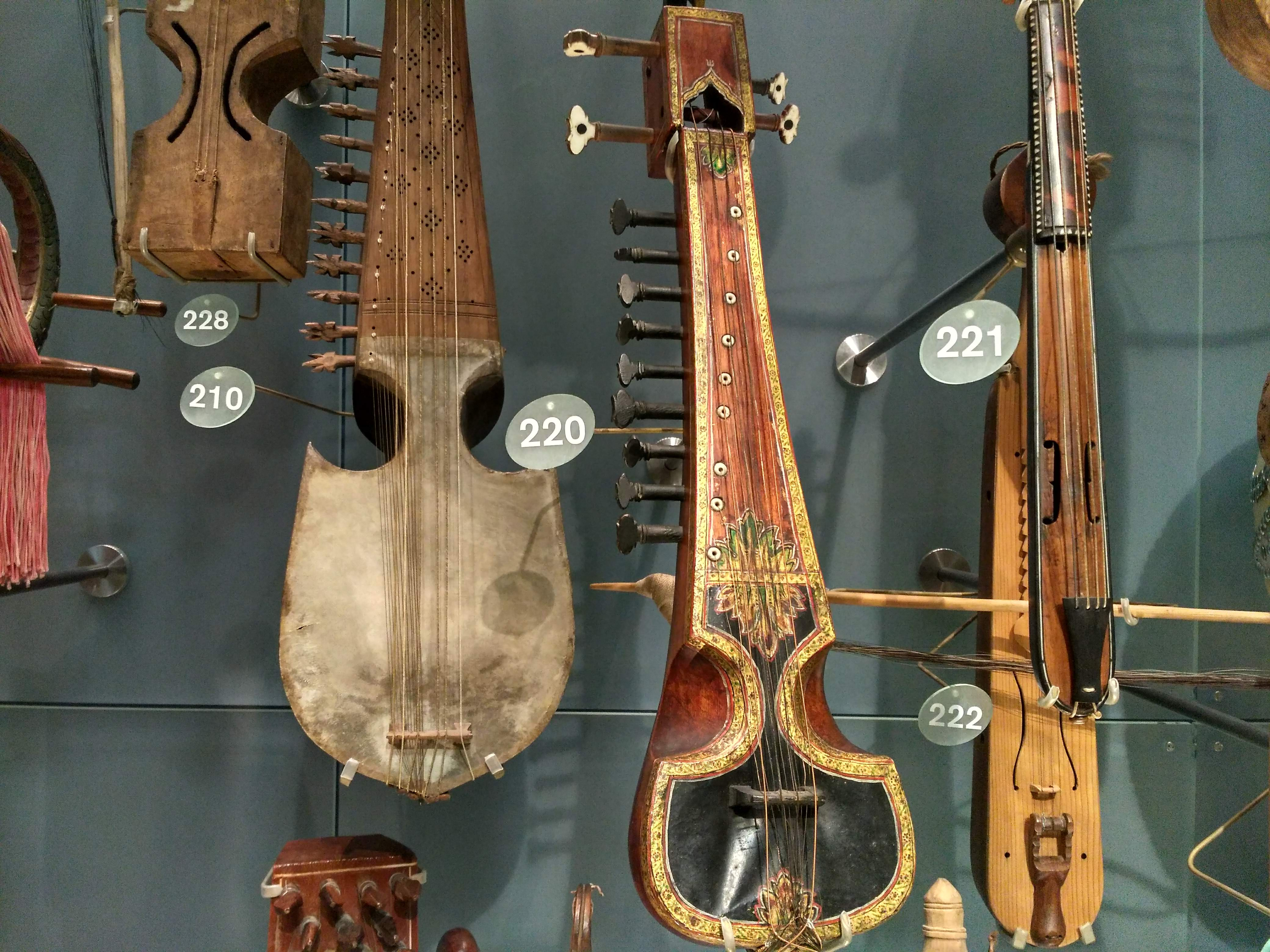
- Chikara (second from left in foreground, #220) in the Horniman museum, London, UK.

String instrument
- Classification: String instrument
- Hornbostel–Sachs classification: (Composite chordophone)

Related instruments
- Chikari

The chikara is a bowed stringed musical instrument from India used to play Indian folk music. It is used by the tribal people of Rajasthan, Madhya Pradesh and Uttar Pradesh.

== Description ==
The chikara is a simple spike fiddle played, similarly to the sarangi or sarinda, by sliding fingernails on the strings rather than pressing them to touch the fingerboard. It has 3 strings, two horse hair and one steel, in 3 courses and is tuned C, F, G.

== Ambiguity ==
The term "chikara" is often used ambiguously to describe a variety of unrelated folk fiddles of northern India.

== Related Instruments ==
- Chikari, smaller version of chikara.
- Sarangi
