= Ranjan veena =

Plucked string musical instrument

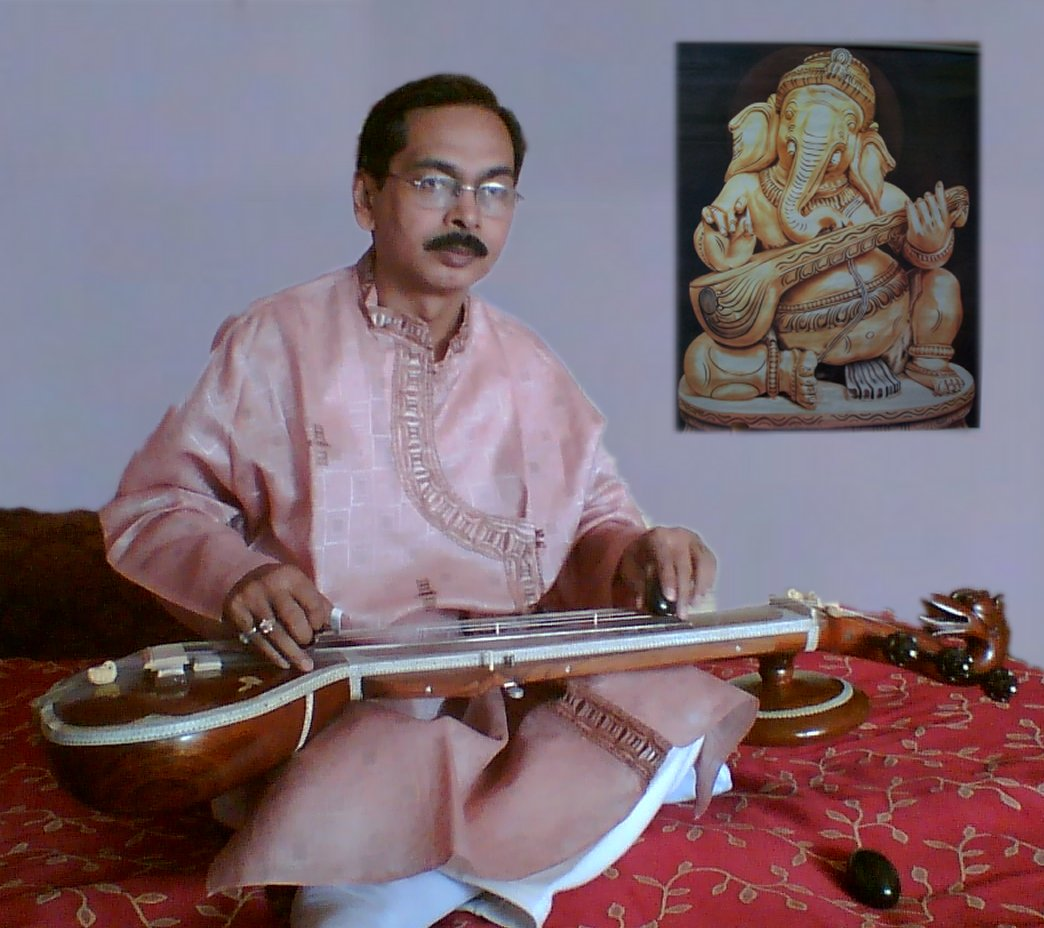
Ranjan Veena by Pandit Niranjan Haldar

Ranjan Veena is a plucked string musical instrument invented and patented by Pandit Niranjan Haldar, a retired senior Grade-A artist from All India Radio (Indore, India).

== Invention ==
Haldar has more than 40 years of experience in Indian and Western Classical music and has performed at various concerts and events such as Vichitra Veena for Akashvani, Doordarshan and Sangeet Natak Academy. He drew inspiration from Vichitra Veena.

After a decade of work he created a smaller musical instrument with a unique tonal quality that is a combination of the veena, sitar and guitar. The instrument is played with picks on fore-finger, middle-finger and thumb. On the Ranjan Veena, an experienced musician can play all the Indian Classical Instrumental techniques: Meed (Slide) Gamak, Krintan, Gitkari and the fast Taans.

== Structure ==
- Type: finger picking instruments
- Picks: 2 Finger Picks, 1 Thumb Pick & Stone/ Glass slide
- Size (L*B*H): (1100mm X 330mm X 150mm)
- Weight: 3.6 kg (7.93 lbs)
- Main Strings: 5; Secondary/ Chikari Strings - 4; Sympathetic Strings - 12; Octave Range - 4
- Tuning Knobs: 21 (Indian design with guitar-like mechanism)
- Fret: with 19 reference frets.
