= Dhadi (music) =

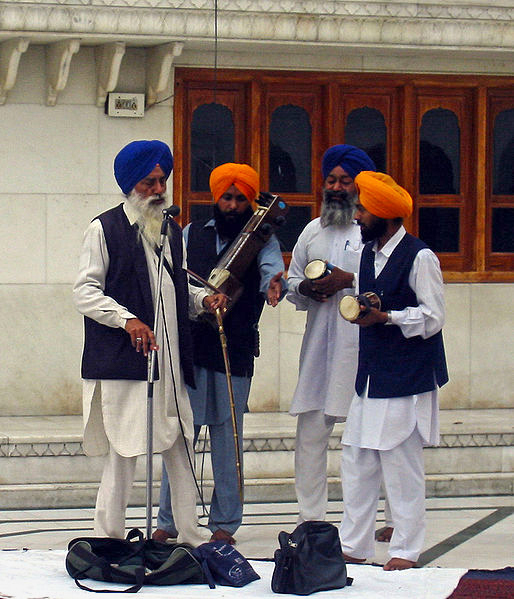
A Dhadi Jatha (of four dhadis) performing

Dhadi (Punjabi: ਢਾਡੀ (Gurmukhi), Dhādi), also spelled as Dhadhi, is one who sings ballads using Dhadd and Sarangi, the folk instruments of Punjab. According to Kahn Singh Nabha's Mahan Kosh the definition of dhadhi is "One who sings ballads of warriors playing Dhadd". Dhadis are a distinct group performers emerged in the time of Sikh gurus.

The word Dhadi can be translated in English to be a minstrel or bard. The word is used several times in the Sikh religious text, Guru Granth Sahib, in the meaning of humbleness. In his compositions, Guru Nanak Dev Ji called himself a Dhadhi of God. The word also appeared in the writing of the third, fourth and fifth Guru and Bhagat Namdev.

Dhadi refers both to a genre of Punjabi music and the performers who play it: a distinctly composed ensemble of ballad-singers. After briefly sketching the long yet hazy background of the art, this article reconstructs its more certain and recent history so far as it can be gleaned from the oral accounts of living dhadi performers. Taken with evidence of recordings—some of the Punjabi industry’s earliest—and the memories of older audience members, a picture is presented of the dhadi genre in its heyday of the early 20th century. The focus is on the dhadis who performed popular ballads; their prominent personalities, geographical distribution, compositional forms, narrative themes, performance manner, and other aspects of the genre are described. The article concludes with biographical sketches of two contemporary dhadis and a selection of texts of dhadi compositions.

== History ==
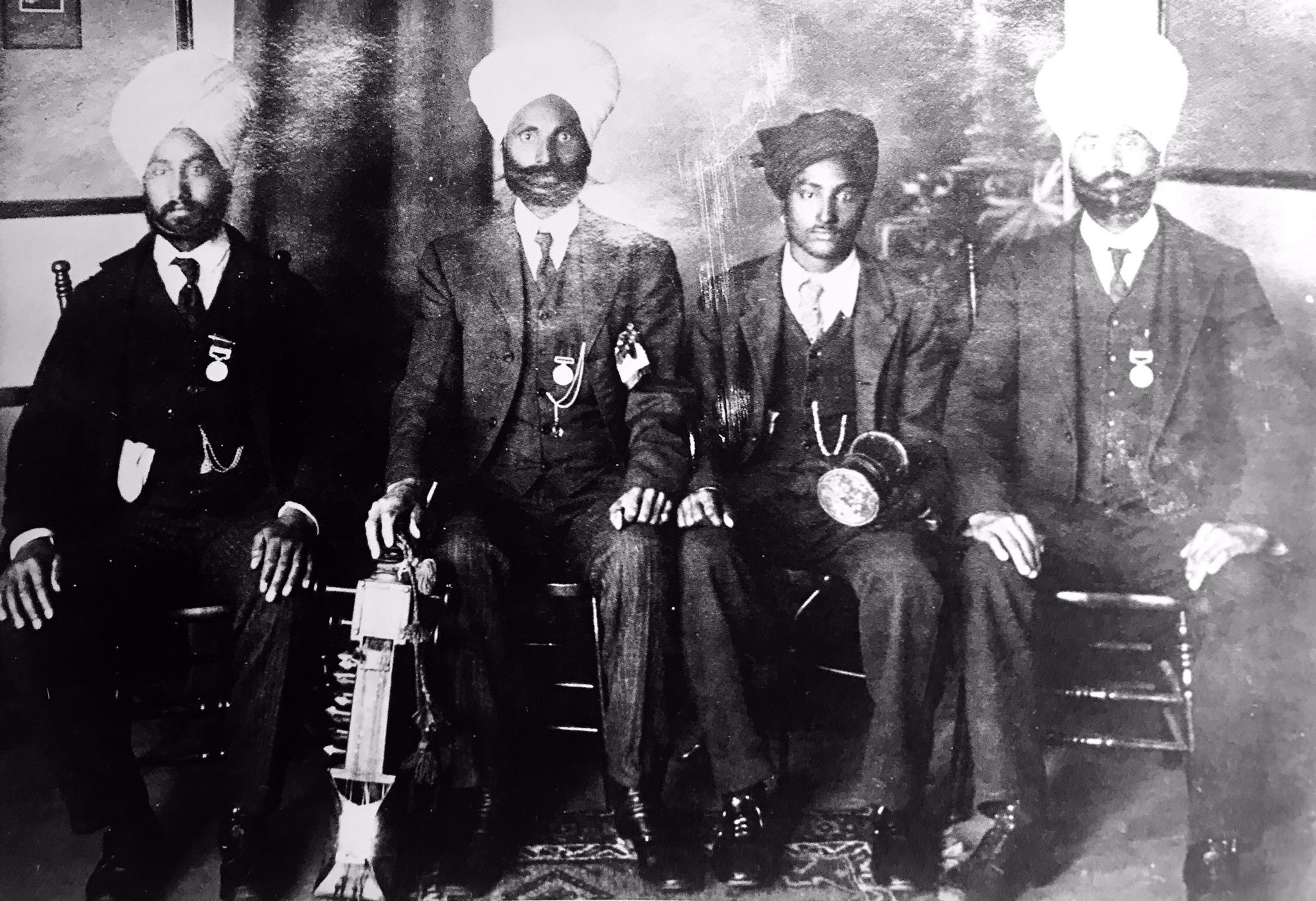
Canadian Sikh Dhadhi Jatha photographed in British Columbia. Canada, ca.1905

As the word is used by the Sikh Gurus, it's clear that Dhadis has a history of hundreds of years. The sixth Sikh guru, Guru Hargobind fostered and promoted the Dhadi art and transformed the tradition from singing the praises of landlords or rulers to sing the praises of the true God. Dhadis were mainly emerged in the time of the sixth Sikh master Guru Hargobind who established the Sikh high court, Akal Takht, and established Dhadhis to sing the previously composed Gurbani from Guru Granth Sahib. Later, the contemporary Dhadis repertoire had broadened to include heroic ballads known as Vaars.

In that age only the lower caste people, i.e. Mirasis, used to sing as the profession was not considered to be noble or respectable for higher classes/castes. While Mirasis were Muslims, Dhadis were not confined to a particular religious affiliation. Guru Hargobind Sahib fostered the Dhadis and refined their repertoire. Along with singing Gurbani, their songs came to deal with the tales of heroism and valour and was used to entertain as well as to fill the army with warrior's spirit. Two Dhadis of that age, Bhai Natha and Bhai Abdulla, are still remembered with respect. Bhai Abdulla was a gifted poet and used to sing his own compositions in the Guru's court.

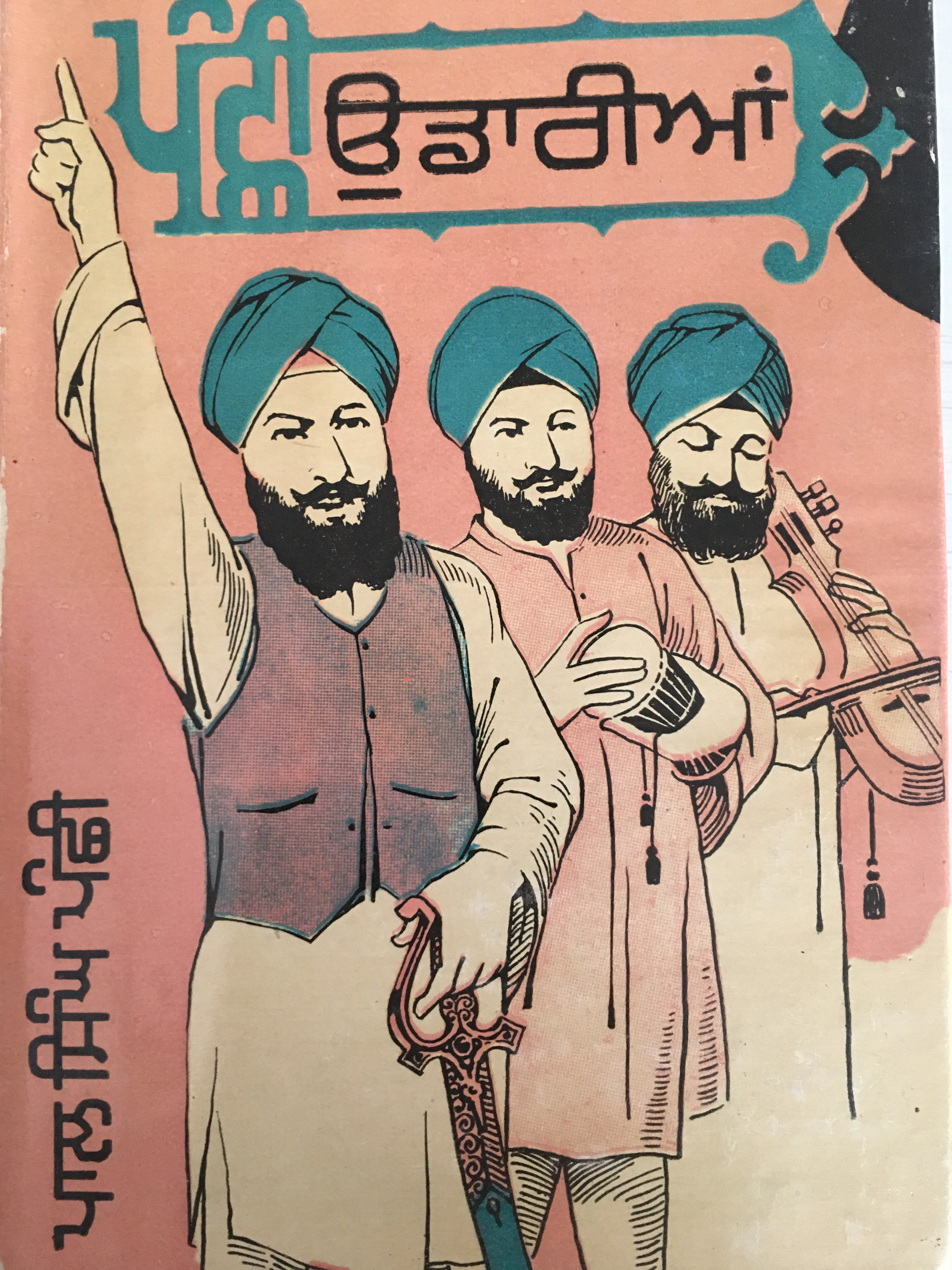
Illustration of a Dhadi musical group of three

The vogue of the Dhadi tradition rose quickly during this period. Dhadis usually perform in groups of three, where heroic ballads are musically performed but "interspersed with chanted narratives." The overall tone of a dhadi performance tends to be highly charged and is full of emotions. However, the source for the hymns they sing are not sourced from the sanctified works of literature, so the musical performances of dhadis is not classified as "Sikh shabad kirtan" but it still forms a vital and important part of Sikh musicology. A further difference between dhadi performers and other Sikh music traditions is that the dhadis perform whilst standing up, meanwhile the other Sikh musician types perform whilst sitting down.

== Dhadi Jatha ==
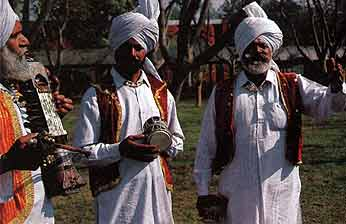
A performance by a Dhadi Jatha

Dhadi Jatha (ਢਾਡੀ-ਜੱਥਾ: Jatha means 'a team' or a group) is an ensemble or band of Dhadis which usually consists of three or four Dhadis: one Sarangi master/player, two dhadd players and one telling the story by a lecture. The singers sing one by one or together like chorus according to the lyrics.

The Dhadis today are the integral part of Sikh and Punjabi music. The tradition has broadened its repertoire, including religious compositions, heroic ballads, folklores, folk love stories, history, romance and other types of folk songs. Normally, the Jathas are known by the leader's name; for example, Dhadi Jatha of Nirmal Singh Noor.

Popularly Known Dhadi Jatha Groups

- Dhadi Jatha Jaswant Singh Taan
- Sarangi Master Karam Singh
- Dhadi Kuldeep Singh
- Dhadi Tarlochan Singh Bhamadi
- Dhadi Gurbakash Singh Albela
- Late Dhadi Sohan Singh Seetal
- Late Dhadi Pyara Singh Panchi
- Late Dhadi Pal Singh Panchi
- Dhadi Daya Singh Dilbar
- Sarangi Master Ajit Singh
- Sarangi Master Chamkaur Singh Jalalabadi
- Dhadi Kuljit Singh Dilbar - son of Daya Singh Dilbar
- Dhadi Jatha Bibi Daler Kaur Khalsa Pandori Khas

== See also ==
- Folk Instruments of Punjab
- Jatha
