= Vasishtha =

Ancient Indian sage

Brahmarishi Vasishtha
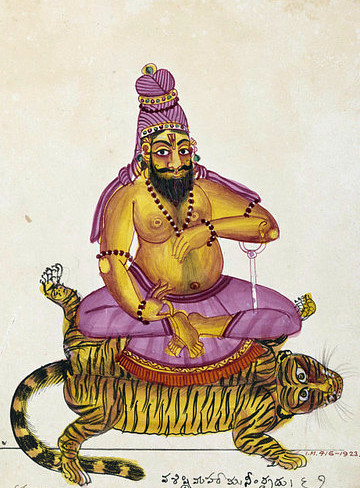
- An illustration of Vashishta
- Title: Saptarishi, Brahmarishi, Maharishi

Personal life
- Spouse: Arundhati
- Children: Shakti, Citraketu, Surocis, Virajas, Mitra, Ulbana, Vasubhrdyana and Dyumat Niyoga child for Kalmashapada Asmaka
- Parent: Brahma Mitra-Varuna
- Notable work: Rigveda

Religious life
- Religion: Historical Vedic religion

Vasishtha (Sanskrit: वसिष्ठ, lit. 'most excellent', IAST: Vasiṣṭha) is one of the oldest and revered Vedic rishis or sages, and one of the Saptarishis (seven great Rishis). Vasishtha is credited as the chief author of Mandala 7 of the Rigveda. Vasishtha and his family are mentioned in Rigvedic verse 10.167.4, (Note: Kasyapa is mentioned in RV 9.114.2, Atri in RV 5.78.4, Bharadvaja in RV 6.25.9, Vishvamitra in RV 10.167.4, Gautama in RV 1.78.1, Jamadagni in RV 3.62.18, etc.; Original Sanskrit text: प्रसूतो भक्षमकरं चरावपि स्तोमं चेमं प्रथमः सूरिरुन्मृजे । सुते सातेन यद्यागमं वां प्रति विश्वामित्रजमदग्नी दमे ॥४॥) other Rigvedic mandalas and in many Vedic texts. His ideas have been influential and he was called the first sage of the Vedanta school of Hindu philosophy by Adi Shankara.

The Yoga Vāsishtha, Vasishta Samhita, as well as some versions of the Agni Purana and Vishnu Purana are attributed to him. He is the subject of many stories, such as him being in possession of the divine cow Kamadhenu and Nandini her child, who could grant anything to their owners. He is famous in Hindu stories for his legendary conflicts with sage Vishvamitra. In the Ramayana, he is the family priest of the Raghu dynasty and teacher of Rama and his brothers.

== Etymology ==
Vasishtha is also spelled as Vasiṣṭha and is Sanskrit for "most excellent", "best" or "richest". According to Monier-Williams, it is sometimes incorrectly spelled "Vashishta" (vaśiṣṭha, वशिष्ठ).

== History ==
Historically, Vasishtha was a Rigvedic poet and the purohita of Sudās Paijavana, chief of the Bharata tribe. In Rigvedic hymn 7.33.9, Vasishtha is described as a scholar who moved across the Sarasvati river to establish his school. At some point, he replaced Viśvāmitra Gāthina as the purohita of Sudās. In later Hindu texts, Viśvāmitra and Vasishtha have a long-standing feud, and scholars have stated they historically had a feud regarding the position of the Bharata purohita. However, this view has been criticized due to lack of internal evidence and the projection of later views onto the Rigveda. Under Sudās and Vasishtha, the Tṛtsu-Bharatas won the Battle of the Ten Kings. Sudās decisively won against a Puru-led alliance by the strategic breaching of a (natural) dyke on the Ravi river thereby drowning most of their opponents; the victory is attributed to the benevolence and strategizing of Indra, the patron-god of the Bharatas, whose blessings were secured by Vasishtha's poetics.

He was married to Arundhati, and therefore he was also called Arundhati Natha, meaning the husband of Arundhati. Later, this region is believed in the Indian tradition to be the abode of sage Vyasa along with Pandavas of Mahabharata. He is typically described in ancient and medieval Hindu texts as a sage with long flowing hair neatly tied into a bun that is coiled with a tuft to the right, a beard, a handlebar moustache and a tilak on his forehead.

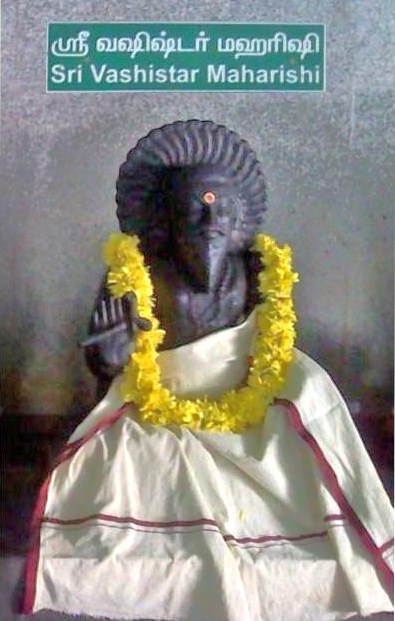
A Vasishtha statue in granite stone.

In Buddhist Pali canonical texts such as Digha Nikaya, Tevijja Sutta describes a discussion between the Buddha and Vedic scholars of his time. The Buddha names ten rishis, calls them "early sages" and makers of ancient verses that have been collected and chanted in his era, and among those ten rishi is Vasettha (the Pali spelling of Vasishtha in Sanskrit. (Note: The Buddha names the following as "early sages" of Vedic verses, "Atthaka (either Ashtavakra or Atri), Vamaka, Vamadeva, Vessamitta (Visvamitra), Yamataggi, Angirasa, Bharadvaja, Vasettha (Vashistha), Kassapa (Kashyapa) and Bhagu (Bhrigu)".)

=== Ideas ===
Vasishtha is the author of the seventh book of the Rigveda, one of its "family books" and among the oldest layer of hymns in the Vedic scriptures of Hinduism. The hymns composed by Vasishtha are dedicated to Agni, Indra and other gods, but according to RN Dandekar, in a book edited by Anay Kumar Gupta, these hymns are particularly significant for four Indravarunau hymns. These have an embedded message of transcending "all thoughts of bigotry", suggesting a realistic approach of mutual "coordination and harmony" between two rival religious ideas by abandoning disputed ideas from each and finding the complementary spiritual core in both. These hymns declare two gods, Indra and Varuna, as equally great. In another hymn, particularly the Rigvedic verse 7.83.9, Vasishtha teaches that the Vedic gods Indra and Varuna are complementary and equally important because one vanquishes the evil by the defeat of enemies in battles, while other sustains the good during peace through socio-ethical laws. The seventh mandala of the Rigveda by Vasishtha is a metaphorical treatise. Vasishtha reappears as a character in Hindu texts, through its history, that explore conciliation between conflicting or opposing ideologies.

According to Ellison Findly, a professor of Religion, Vasishtha hymns in the Rigveda are among the most intriguing in many ways and influential. Vasishtha emphasizes means to be as important as ends during one's life encouraging truthfulness, devotion, optimism, family life, sharing one's prosperity with other members of society, among other cultural values.

== Attributed texts ==
Excellence

Practise righteousness (dharma), not unrighteousness.
Speak the truth, not an untruth.
Look at what is distant, not what's near at hand.
Look at the highest, not at what's less than highest.

— Vasishtha Dharmasutra 30.1

Vasishtha is a revered sage in the Hindu traditions, and like other revered sages, numerous treatises composed in ancient and medieval era are reverentially named after him. Some treatises named after him or attributed to him include:

- Vasishtha Samhita is a medieval era Yoga text. There is an Agama as well with the same title.
- Vasishtha Dharmasutra, an ancient text, and one of the few Dharma-related treatises which has survived into the modern era. This Dharmasūtra (300–100 BCE) forms an independent text and other parts of the Kalpasūtra, that is Shrauta- and Grihya-sutras are missing. It contains 1,038 sutras.
- Yoga Vāsishtha is a syncretic medieval era text that presents Vedanta and Yoga philosophies. It is written in the form of a dialogue between Vasishtha and prince Rama from the Ramayana. It is about the nature of life, human suffering, choices as the nature of life, free will, human creative power and spiritual liberation. Yoga Vāsishtha teachings are structured as stories and fables, with a philosophical foundation similar to those found in Advaita Vedanta. The text is also notable for its discussion of Yoga. According to Christopher Chapple – a professor of Indic studies specializing in Yoga and Indian religions, the Yoga Vāsishtha philosophy can be summarized as, "Human effort can be used for self-betterment and that there is no such thing as an external fate imposed by the gods".
- Agni Purana is attributed to Vasishtha.
- Vishnu Purana is attributed to Vasishtha along with Rishi Pulatsya. He has also contributed to many Vedic hymns and is seen as the arranger of Vedas during Dvapara Yuga.

== Legend ==
=== Birth ===
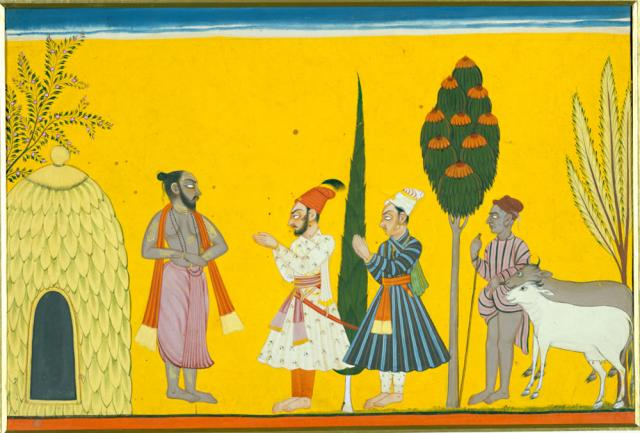
King Vishvamitra visits Vasishtha (left)

According to Rigvedic hymns 7.33.10 and 7.33.11, the gods Mitra-Varuna and the apsara Urvashi are mentioned as his parents. In the story, Mitra and Varuna are performing a yajna (fire-sacrifice), when they see Urvasi and become sexually aroused. They ejaculate their semen into a pitcher, from which Vasishtha is born.

Vasishtha's birth story is retold in many later Hindu scriptures. The Puranas state that he has three births. In the first, he is a manasaputra (mind-born son) created by the god Brahma. After the destruction of the Daksha Yajna, Vasishtha is killed, but is recreated by Brahma. Vasishtha became the royal guru of Nimi, a king. However, Nimi forgot to invite Vasishtha in a yajna and an enraged Vasishtha cursed Nimi to die soon. Nimi responded by offering him the same curse. Frightened, Vasishtha ran towards his father, Brahma. Brahma suggested him to merge into Varuna and Mitra. When Urvashi was seen by Varuna and Mitra, Vasishtha reemerged from them.

According to Agarwal, one story states that Vasishtha wanted to commit suicide by falling into river Sarasvati. But the river prevented this sacrilege by splitting into hundreds of shallow channels. This story, states Agarwal, may have very ancient roots, where "the early man observed the braiding process of the Satluj" and because such a story could not have been invented without the residents observing an ancient river (in Rajasthan) drying up and its tributaries such as Sutlej reflowing to merge into Indus river.

=== Rivalry with Vishvamitra ===
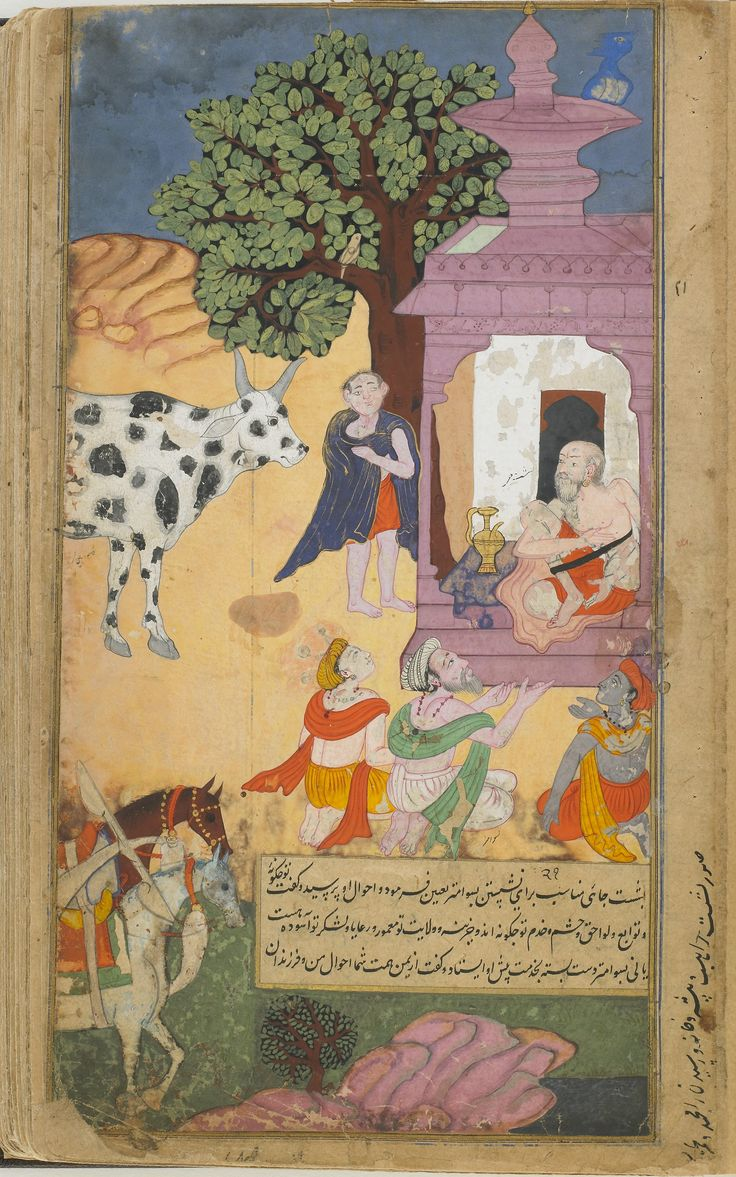
Vasishta summons Shabala, the cow of abundance, to provide for a feast

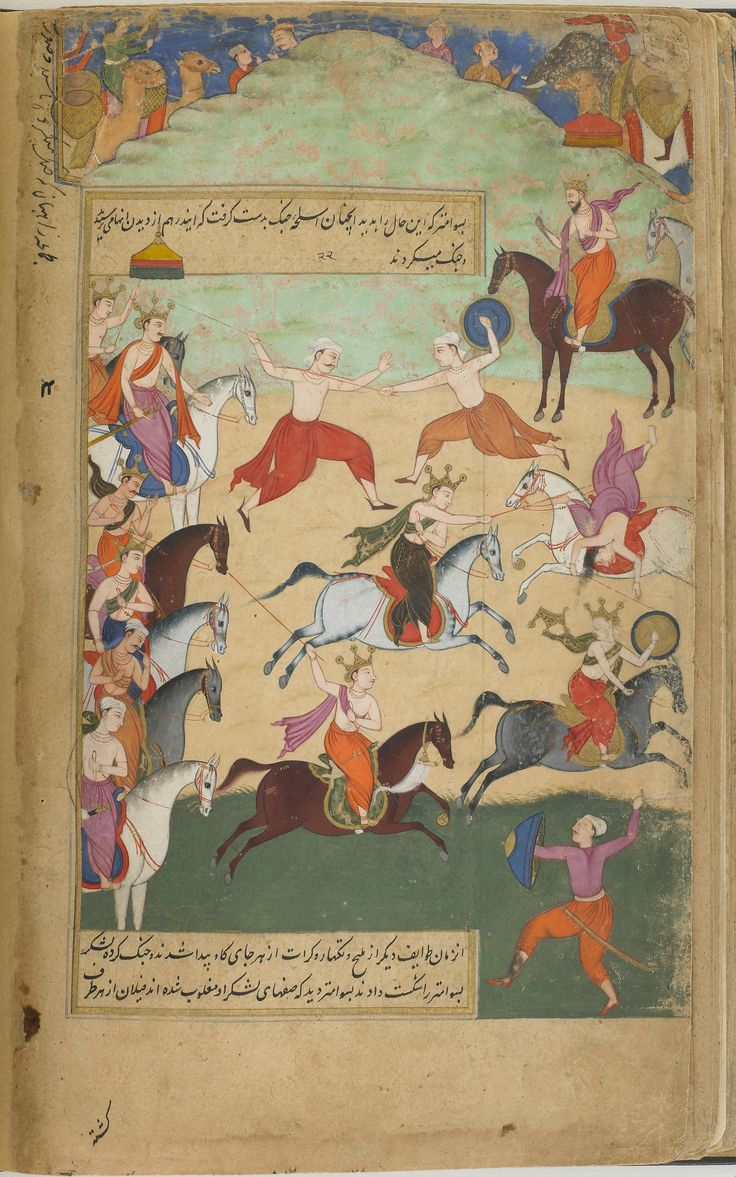
The forces of Vishvamitra and those raised by Vasishta's volition battle for possession of Shabala

Vasishtha is known for his feud with Vishvamitra. The king Vishvamitra coveted Vasishtha's divine cow Nandini (Kamadhenu) that could fulfil material desires. Vasishtha destroyed Vishvamitra's army and sons. Vishvamitra acquired weapons from Shiva and incinerated Vasishtha's hermitage and sons, but Vasishtha baffled all of Vishvamitra's weapons. There is also an instance mentioned in the Mandala 7, of the Rigveda about the Battle of the Ten Kings. This battle was fought as King Sudas of Bharata tribe appointed Vasishtha instead of Vishvamitra as his main priest. However later, Vishvamitra betook severe penances for thousands of years and became a Brahmarshi. He eventually reconciled with Vasishtha.

=== Disciples ===
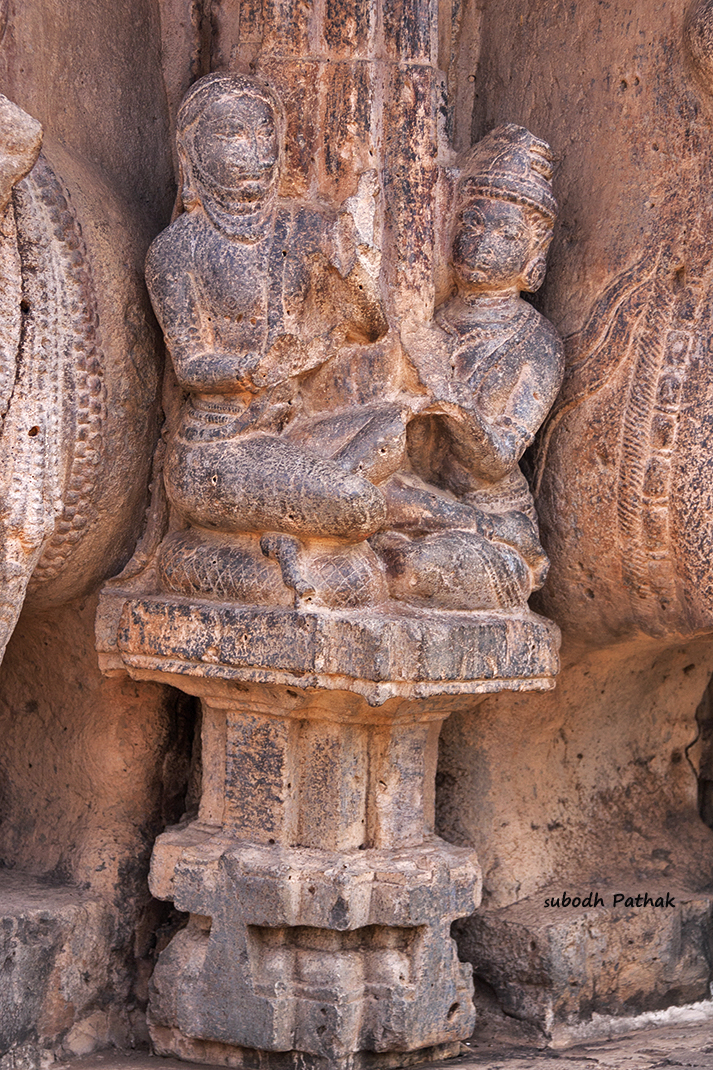
Vasishtha teaching Rama

Vasishtha is known as the priest and preceptor, teacher of the Ikshvaku kings clan. He was also the preceptor of Manu, the progenitor of Kshatriyas and Ikshvaku's father. Other characters like Nahusha, Rantideva, lord Rama and Bhishma were his disciples. When the Bharata king Samvarta lost his kingdom to the Panchalas, he became the disciple of Vasishtha. Under Vasishtha's guidance, Samvarta regained his kingdom and became the ruler of the earth.

== The Vasishtha Head ==
A copper casting of a human head styled in the manner described for Vasishtha was discovered in 1958 in Delhi. This piece has been dated to around 700 CE, plus minus 80 years, in three western universities (ETH Zurich, Stanford and UC) using among other methods carbon-14 dating tests, spectrographic analysis, X-ray dispersal analysis and metallography. This piece is called "Vasishtha head", because the features, hairstyle, tilak and other features of the casting resemble the description for Vasishtha in Hindu texts.

The significance of "Vasishtha head" is unclear because it was not found at an archaeological site, but in open Delhi market where it was scheduled to be remelted. Further, the head had an inscription of "Narayana" suggesting that the item was produced in a much later millennium. The item, states Edwin Bryant, likely was re-cast and produced from an ancient pre-2800 BCE copper item that left significant traces of matter with the observed C-14 dating.

== Vasishtha temples ==
Vasishtha Temple, in Vashisht village, Himachal Pradesh

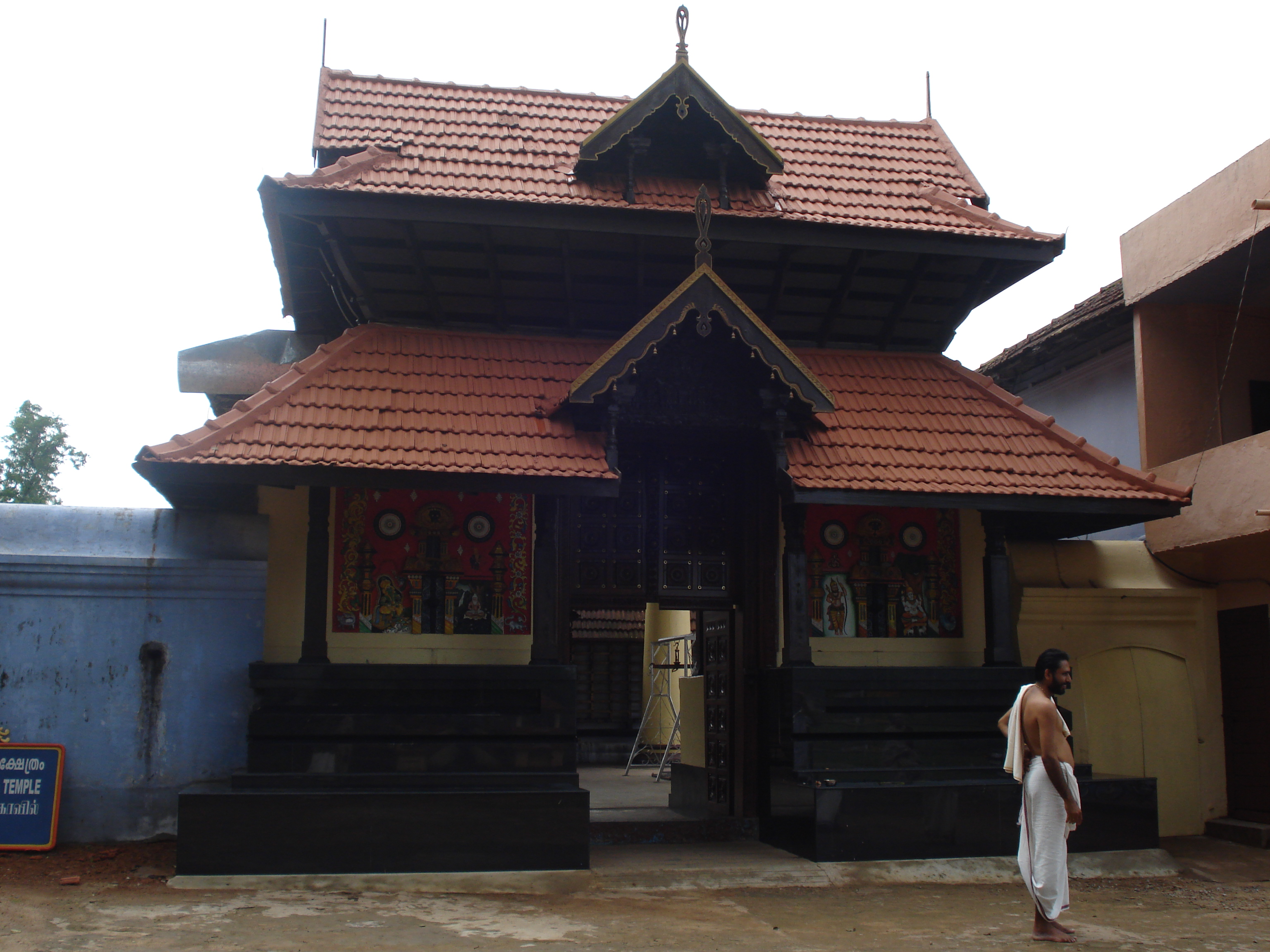
Vasishtha Temple at Arattupuzha, Kerala

There is an Ashram dedicated to Vasishtha in Guwahati, India. This Ashram is situated close to Assam-Meghalaya border to the south of Guwahati city and is a major tourist attraction of Guwahati. Vasishtha's Temple is situated in Vashisht village, Himachal Pradesh. Vasishtha Cave, a cave on the banks of Ganges at Shivpuri, 18 km from Rishikesh is also locally believed to be his winter abode and houses a Shiva temple, also nearby is Arundhati Cave.

Guru Vasishtha is also the primary deity at Arattupuzha Temple known as Arattupuzha Sree Dharmasastha in Arattupuzha village in Thrissur district of Kerala. The famous Arattupuzha Pooram is a yearly celebration where Sri Rama comes from the Thriprayar Temple to pay obeisance to his Guru at Arattupuzha temple.

== In popular culture ==
In 2026, Vasishtha was portrayed by Shishir Sharma in the film, Ramayana: Part 1.

== See also ==
- Agastya
- Aruni
- Atri
- Kashyapa
- List of Indian philosophers
