= Thrippekulam Achutha Marar =

Indian Chenda exponent (1921-2014)

- Born: September 26, 1921; Urakam, Kingdom of Cochin (present-day Thrissur district of Kerala)
- Died: March 15, 2014 (aged 92)
- Occupation: percussionist
- Awards: Sangeet Natak Akademi Award (2012); Kerala Sangeetha Nataka Akademi Award (1997)

Thrippekulam Achutha Marar (also spelled as Trippekkulam) is an Indian percussionist from Kerala. He was an exponent in Indian percussion instruments like Chenda, Edakka, Thavil and Timila. He received many awards and honors including the Sangeet Natak Akademi Award from Sangeet Natak Akademi, Government of India, Pallavur Puraskaram by the Government of Kerala and the Kerala Sangeetha Nataka Akademi Award from Kerala Sangeetha Nataka Akademi, Government of Kerala.

== Biography ==
Trippekulam Achutha Marar was born in September 26, 1921, near the Ammathiruvadi Temple in Urakam in present-day Thrissur district of Kerala, to Trippekulam Marath Pappamarasyaar and Sitharaman Embranthiri.

Achutha Marar had never learned the Chenda that made him famous, from a master. As a member of an artist family that had been employed in the temple in his native Urakam for generations, he had been introduced to the Sopana Sangeetham singing, and instruments like Edakka, Chenda, ilatalam and the chengila since he was a child. He would play it for ceremonial functions and for the 'Kottipadi Seva', the traditional way of worship in which the performer sings kirtans while playing instrument. After passing the fourth grade, he was instructed to stop going to school.

After a while, Peruvanam Appu Marar introduced Achutha Marar to Thayambaka a little. He later learned the basic lessons of Thavil from Nellikal Narayana Panicker and trained in Timila and Idakka from Annamanada Parameswara Marar.

Achutha Marar inherited to perform ritualistic duties in the temple along with his uncles, Govinda Marar and Krishna Marar. Govinda Marar was often selected as the 'Mela Pramani' (master performer and leader of the percussion team) of the 'Chenda melams' (group performance in which people play Chendas and other percussion instruments) in nearby temple festivals. When he was only in his mid-twenties, he was appointed as the melam leader for the Arattupuzha Pooram festival. His uncle Govinda Marar was supposed to lead it. But he suddenly felt unwell. Highly respected Chenda players including Nanu Marar of Kuruppat and Eechar Marar of Karekkad were in that performing team in which he became the leader. The next day, when Nanu Marar met him at Ollur Edakkunni temple festival, he said that he accepted him as leader only because he belongs to family related to Urakam temple. According to a local custom related to Arattupuzha temple, a person from that family should lead the melam in that temple.

=== Personal life and death ===
At the age of 34, Achutha Marar married Padmakshi Marasiar, and shifted base to Irinjalakuda, Thrissur district. He died on March 15, 2014, at his house in Irinjalakuda.

== Career ==
Marar got into playing the Chenda and Edakka at a very young age. He was known to produce euphonious notes of the flute on his Edakka. Early in his career, he was a Thavil artist in Nadaswaram concerts in Central Kerala and a Timila player for Panchavadyam in the northern parts of Kerala. He later gave them up to focus on Chenda.

The skill he acquired in playing the Thavil helped him immensely in playing the Chenda along with the kurumkuzhal for the Kuzhal Pattu. Along with Kombath Kuttappa Panicker, Achutha Marar would play meticulously with his left hand and a stick in his right hand, aligning the pitch of the Chenda with the sound of the kurumkuzhal. Marar Also accompanied Ammannur Madhava Chakyar on the thimila in his Koodiyattam performances, and accompanied Paramasivam's Bharatanatyam performances on the thavil.

After becoming the lead at the Arattupuzha Pooram, he was elected as the leader of many small and medium Poorams in the area. At the same time, he became active in Panchavadyam. However, it was another thirty years before he became the lead in big Poorams.

Achutha Marar participated in Madathil varavu, the ritualistic procession in the Thrissur Pooram from the age of forty. Initially, Marar, who played Thimila in Panchavadyam of Thrissur Pooram, gradually rose to fame as a master performer in Chenda and became the Pramaani (leader and master performer) of the Thiruvambadi side at the Thrissur Pooram for 14 years, and voluntarily retired from that responsibility at the age of 85. He had performed both the thimila (Panchavadyam) and chenda (Pandi Melam) for the Thiruvambadi during the Pooram festivals. Despite his age and ailments, he continued to perform till the age of 92.

== Awards and honors ==
The oldest living artist to receive the Sangeet Natak Akademi Award was Achutha Marar, who received the award in 2012 at the age of 91. He also received the Melacharya Puraskaram from Kerala Kalamandalam, Pallavur Puraskaram by the Government of Kerala, the Kerala Sangeetha Nataka Akademi Award from Kerala Sangeetha Nataka Akademi, Government of Kerala, and the first ever Vadhyamithra Puraskaaram. He has also been honored by the Paramekkavu and Thiruvambadi Devaswoms with a 'Veera Sringala'.

Marar's disciples and admirers together celebrated his ninetieth birthday at the Unnai Warrior Memorial Art Gallery in the Irinjalakuda temple premises. The birth centenary of Achutha Marar was celebrated on October 4, 2021.

=== Thrippekulam Award ===
The Pallavoor Kalaswadaka Samiti in Irinjalakuda has been giving out the Thrippekulam Award since the year after his death. Thimila exponent Chottanikkara Vijayan won this award in 2021. Kalamandalam Balaraman received the award in 2022, and Pindiyath Chandran Nair received the award in 2024.
