= Chengalloor Ranganathan =

Male Asian elephant in Kerala, India (died 1917)

- Species: Elephas maximus (Asian Elephant)
- Sex: Male
- Died: 1917; Thrissur
- Resting place: State Museum & Zoo, Thrissur
- Nationality: India
- Years active: 1906-1914
- Known for: Arattupuzha Pooram, other Poorams
- Predecessor: Poomully Shekharan
- Owner: Parameshwaran Namboodiri of Chengalloor Mana
- Height: 3.45 m (11 ft 4 in)
- Named after: Ranganatha

Chengalloor Ranganathan (died 1917) was a male Asian elephant in Kerala, India, which is believed to have been the tallest captive elephant in Asia.

== Life ==
Ranganathan was originally a temple elephant with the Ranganatha Swamy temple in Tiruchirappalli, Madras Presidency. The temple had acquired him when still a calf and used him for daily chores but as he grew taller, he was unable to enter through the inner gates of the temple. This and the fact that elephants are not a part of temple festivals in Tamil Nadu made him a liability for the temple which then decided to sell him. In 1905, he was acquired from the Sreerangam Devaswom by Parameshwaran Namboodiri of Chengalloor Mana in Thrissur for a price of Rs.1,500. It is believed that the elephant walked the distance from Tiruchirappalli to Thrissur over several months. From 1906 to 1914, he carried the main idol during the Arattupuzha Pooram and was part of the Thiruvambady faction of the Thrissur Pooram. In 1914, during the Arattupuzha Pooram he was grievously gored by the tusker Akavoor Govindan. Following this incident, he was moved to Chengalloor Mana where he underwent prolonged treatment for his injuries, but died in 1917.

== Museum exhibit ==
On learning of the imminent death of Ranganathan, officials at the Madras Museum sought to acquire his skeleton for mounting it as an exhibit. Ranganathan's owners consented to this request and upon his death, he was buried in a large pit with chemicals to aid his quick decomposition. The skeleton was subsequently excavated with each bone being numbered for the purpose of its reconstruction. The skeleton was then obtained by the Thrissur Museum from Madras and was reassembled and installed in the main hall of the museum where it continues to be a major attraction.

== Physical attributes ==
Ranganatha's skeleton is 345 cm (136 in) in height which makes him nearly 30 cm (12 in) taller than Thechikottukavu Ramachandran, the tallest living captive elephant in India. Ranganathan was widely admired by elephant lovers in Kerala.

== In popular culture ==
The Malayalam poet Vallathol Narayana Menon wrote a verse in honour of Ranganathan. As of 2022 a 12 ft 5 in (378 cm) statue of Ranganathan is under construction at the elephant management, treatment-cum-conservation centre at Ganesh Fort in Chittanda, Thrissur, which on completion would be the largest statue of an elephant in India. Ranganathan: Search for the Height — An Art Documentary is a 2022 documentary film on the elephant by Sooraj Nambiat and Sony Narayanan.
