= Thottipal Bhagavati Temple =

Hindu temple in Kerala, India

- Bhagavathy Temple, Thottippal, Thrissur, Kerala

Religion
- Affiliation: Hinduism
- District: Thrissur
- Deity: Bhagavathy

Location
- Location: Thottippal
- State: Kerala
- Country: India
- Interactive map of Thottipal Bhagavati Temple
- Coordinates: 10.406305°N 76.240272°E

Architecture
- Type: Architecture of Kerala

Specifications
- Temple: One
- Elevation: 36.32 m (119 ft)

Thottipal Bhagavati Temple is a Bhagavathi temple located in Thrissur District of Kerala state. It is one of the 108 Devi temples installed by Parashurama. The temple is also participant of both Arattupuzha Pooram and Peruvanam Pooram. The temple was destroyed in the attacks by Tipu Sultan and was renovated in the late 19th century.

The temple is described as thodipally in 108 durgalayastotram. The goddess is believed to be sister of Urathammathiruvadi and Chathakudam sastha.
