= Poovattoor =

- village
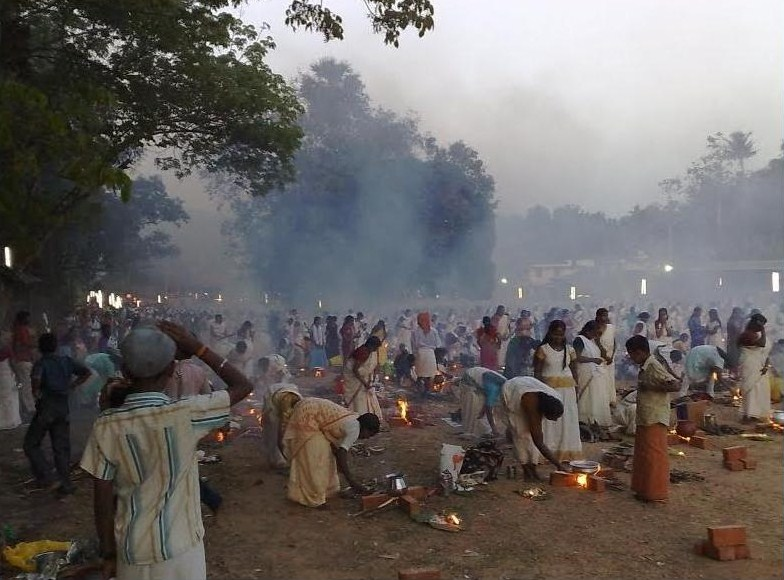
- Pongala festival
- Interactive map of Poovattoor
- Coordinates: 9.05549°0′0″N 76.75126°0′0″E
- Country: India
- State: Kerala
- District: Kollam
- Talukas: Kottarakkara

Languages
  - Official: Malayalam, English
- Time zone: UTC+5:30 (IST)
- PIN: 691 507
- Telephone code: 0091-474-261XXXX
- Vehicle registration: KL-24
- Nearest city: Kollam (31km)
- Lok Sabha constituency: Mavelikkara
- Climate: AVERAGE (Köppen)

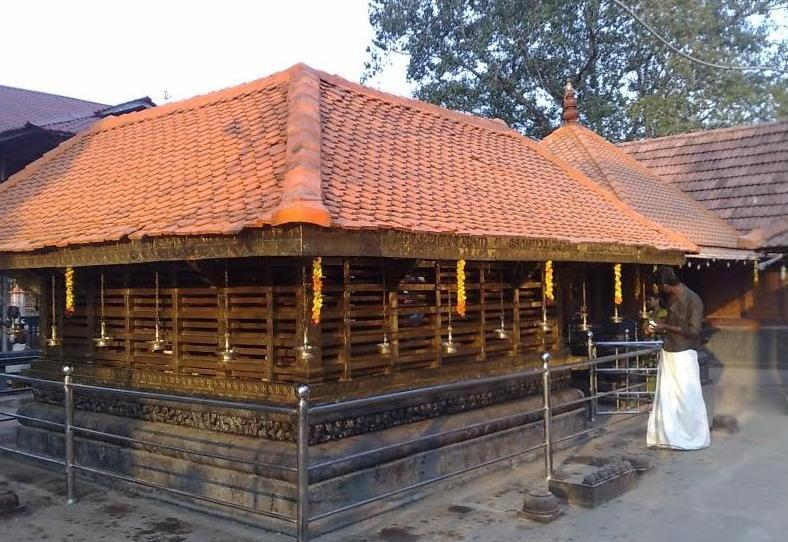
Poovattoor Temple

Poovattoor is a village located in Kottarakara taluk in the northern part of the Kollam District, Kerala state, India. It is best known as the site of an ancient Bhagavathy temple, Poovattoor Devi Temple, sister of Pattazhy Devi Temple, and Mannadi Devi Temple.

== Etymology ==
The name Poovattoor is derived from Poo attoor (meaning "the place where flower fell"). Legend says that the goddess of Poovattoor was the sister of goddess of Pattazhi and Mannadi. The younger sister wanted a new place, so the elder gave her a handful of flowers, and told her to reside where the flowers were falling. Poovattoor was the place where the flower fell.

== Geography ==
Poovattoor can be divided into three parts: Poovattoor west, Poovattoor east, and Poovattoor. MC road is the major road going through the village. The village is located on the banks of Kallada River.

== Culture ==
The annual festival at Poovattoor Devi Temple is one of the largest temple festivals in Kulakkada Panchayat. The festival is known for Kettukazcha, Kambam (fireworks), Aalp Ezhunnallathu (procession of small structure made out of plantain kernel and germinating leaves of coconut tree with numerous lamps on it), and Ponnin Thirumudi (Devi's idol carved out of pure gold and rare precious stones).

== Places of worship ==
The temples in the area include Poovattoor Bahagavathy temple, Mahavishnu temple of Poovattoor East, Vilarithala sri mahadevar temple, Alumkunnil mahadevar temple (Poovattoor west), and Mavady mahavishnu temple.

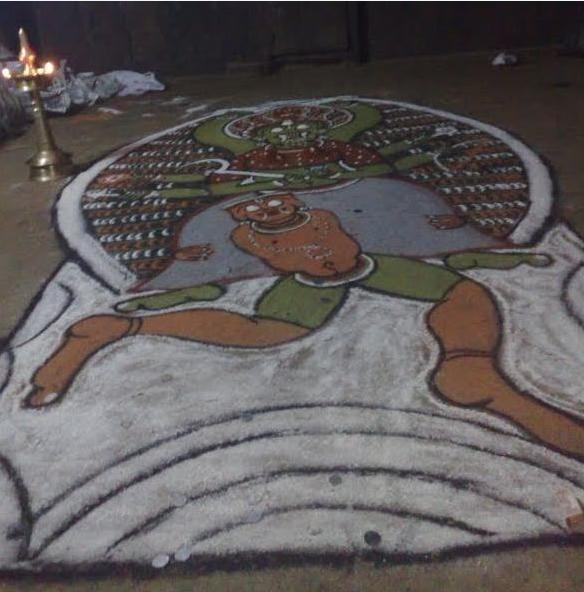
Temple in Poovattoor

== Schools ==
Poovattoor has 3 educational institutions; two of them are under Nair Service Society and the other one is a Govt. L.P School.

1. H.S.S Poovattoor
2. N.S.S L.P School
3. Govt L.P.S Poovattoor

== Hospital ==
There is a Primary Health center in Poovattoor.

== See also ==
- Temples of Kerala
- Kottarakkara
- Kollam
