= Pallimanna Siva Temple =

Temple in Thrissur District, Kerala, India

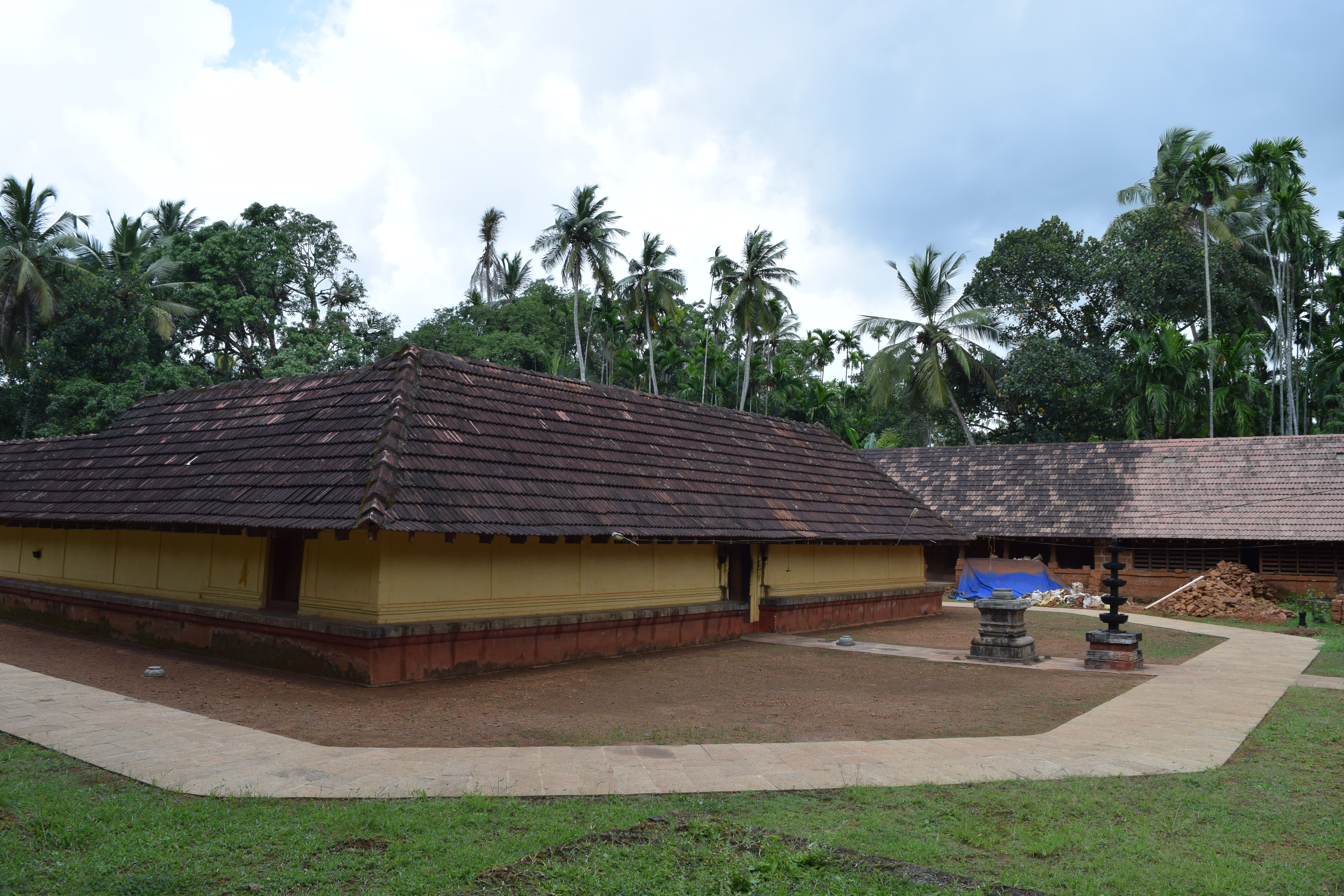
- Side view of the temple

Religion
- Affiliation: Hinduism
- District: Thrissur District
- Deity: Shiva

Location
- Location: Kumbalangad, Thrissur
- State: Kerala
- Country: India
- Interactive map of Pallimanna Siva Temple
- Coordinates: 10°40′22.67″N 76°13′38.83″E

Architecture
- Type: Kerala

Pallimanna Siva Temple is a temple at Kumbalangad a small village in Thrissur District, Kerala, India. The Archeological Survey of India declared the mural paintings on its walls to be a protected monument of national importance since 1983. The murals are dated to the 17th - 18th century AD.

== Gallery ==
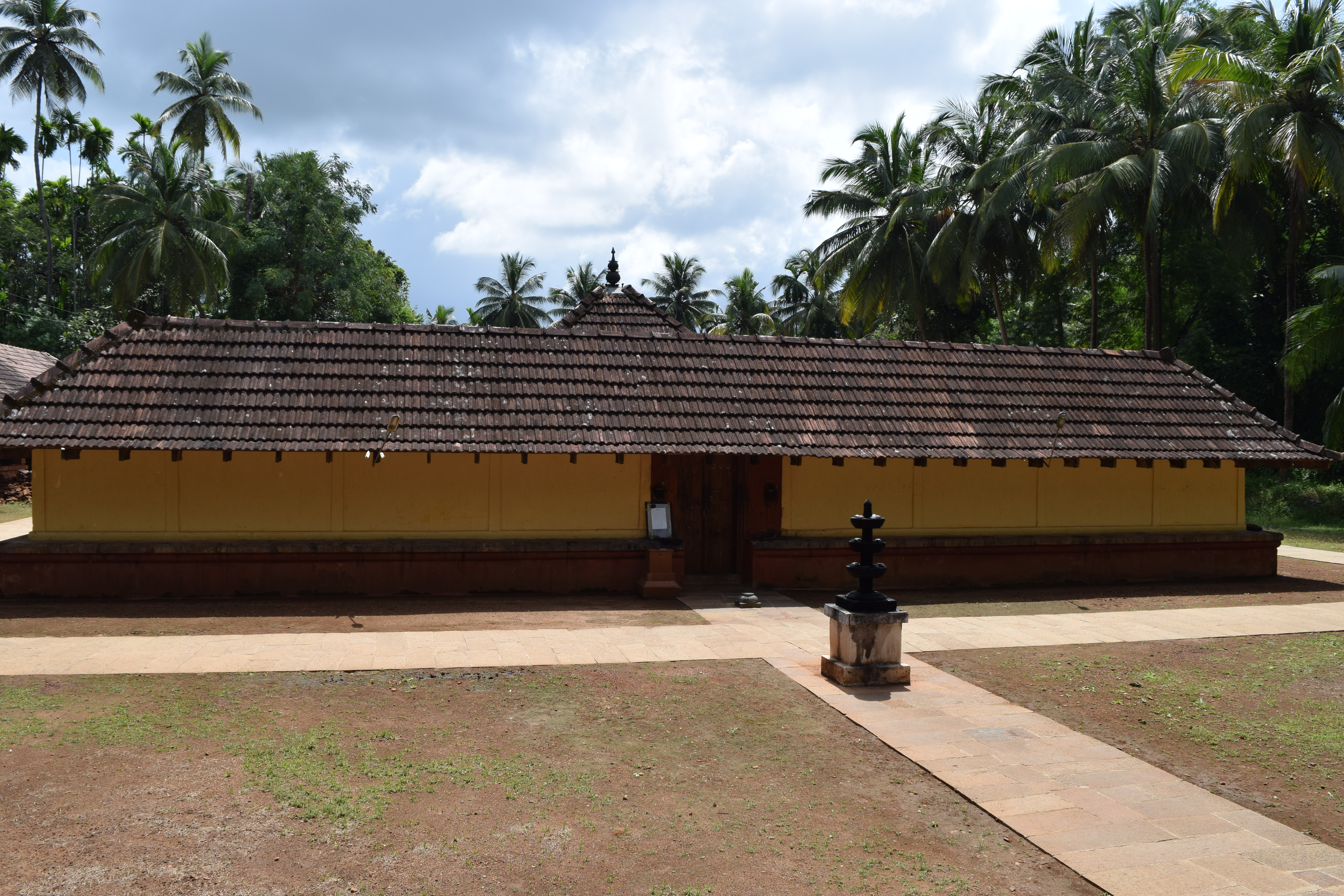
Entrance

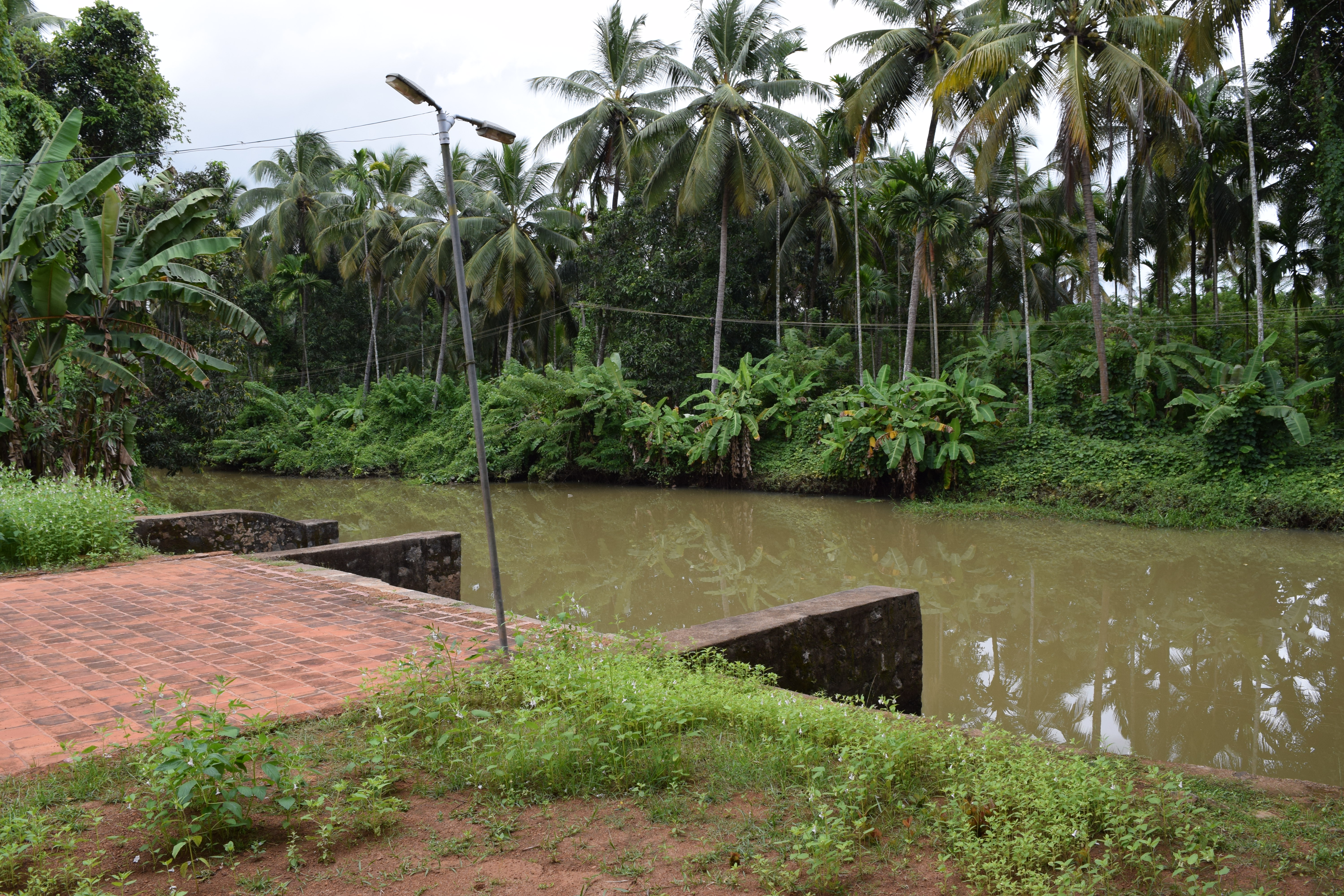
River

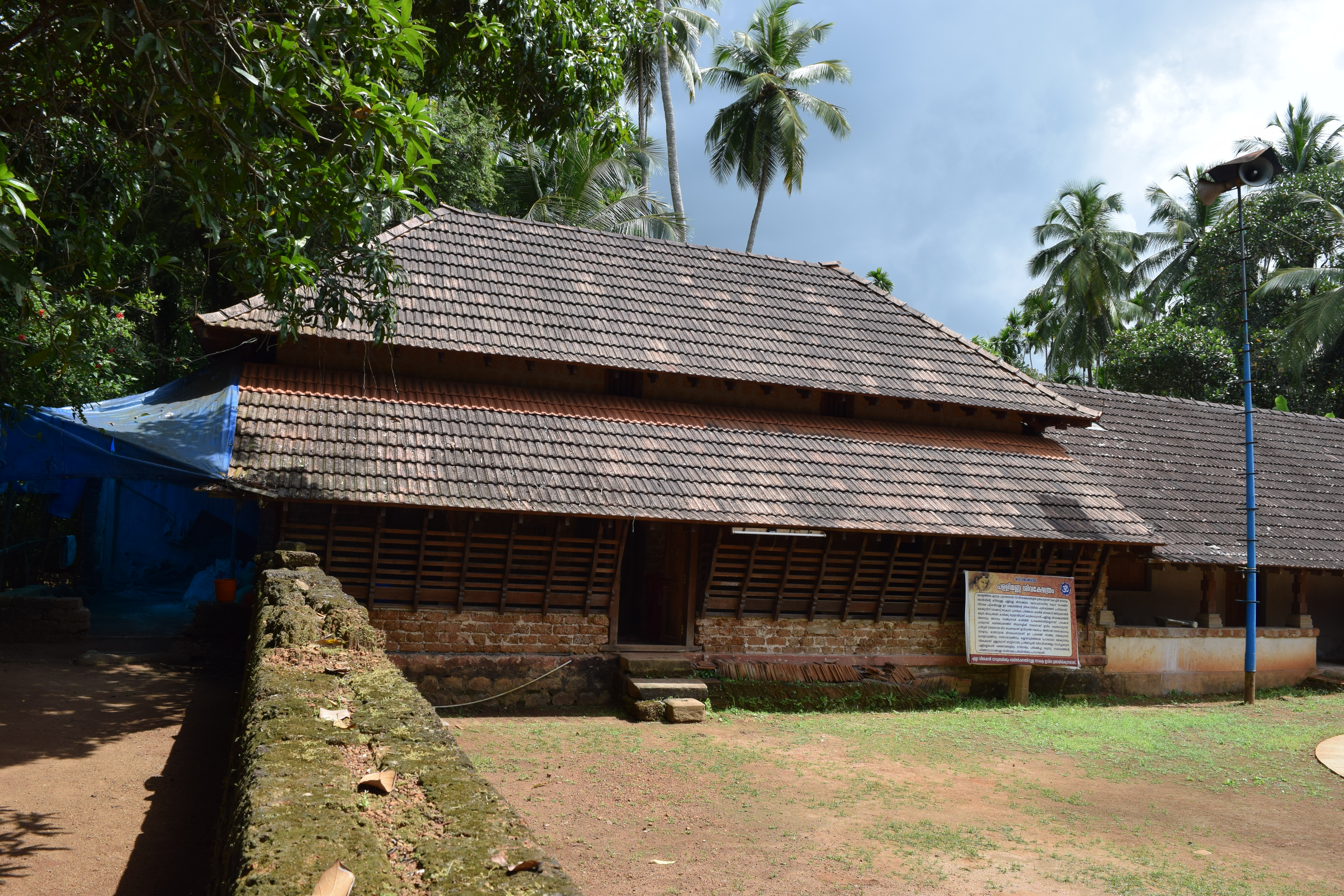
Oottupura
