= Kumbalangad =

- Neighbourhood
- Kumbalangad, Thrissur, Kerala
- Coordinates: 10.6661°N 76.2255°E
- Country: India
- State: Kerala
- District: Thrissur
- Elevation: 53.19 m (174.5 ft)

Languages
  - Official: Malayalam, English
  - Speech: Malayalam, English
- Time zone: UTC+5:30 (IST)
- PIN: 680623
- Telephone code: +914884******
- Vehicle registration: KL-05 ** xxxx
- Other neighbourhoods: Wadakkancherry, Kanjirakode, Chittanda, Parlikad
- Municipality: Wadakkanchery Municipality
- LS: Alathur
- VS: Wadakkancherry

Kumbalangad is a neighbourhood near Wadakkancherry in Thrissur of Kerala state in India.

== Location ==
Kumbalangad is located at an altitude of about 53.19 metres (174.5 ft) above the mean sea level with the geographic coordinates of (10.6661°N 76.2255°E).

Kumbalangad (Kerala)

== Bioremediation ==
Kumbalangad in Wadakkancherry is one of the dumpsites in Thrissur district where bioremediation work is started.

== Religion ==
There is a Syro Malabar Catholic church viz., St. Jude Thaddeus church situated at Kumbalangad.
