= Thottippal =

Thottippal Thottippal Thottippal
- Village
- Thottippal, Thrissur, (Kerala) Thottippal (India)
- Coordinates: 10.4052°N 76.2407°E
- Country: India
- State: Kerala
- District: Thrissur
- Elevation: 40.44 m (132.7 ft)

Population (2011)
  - Total: 7,768

Languages
  - Official: Malayalam, English
- Time zone: UTC+5:30 (IST)
- PIN: 680310
- Vehicle registration: KL- 45

Thottippal is a village in Thrissur district in the state of Kerala, India. It is a part of Parappukkara Grama Panchayat. It houses the famous Thottippal Bhagavathy Temple, one among the 108 Durga Temples in Kerala.

== Demographics ==
As of 2011 India census, Thottippal had a population of 7768 with 3714 males and 4054 females.
