= Arattupuzha =

- Town
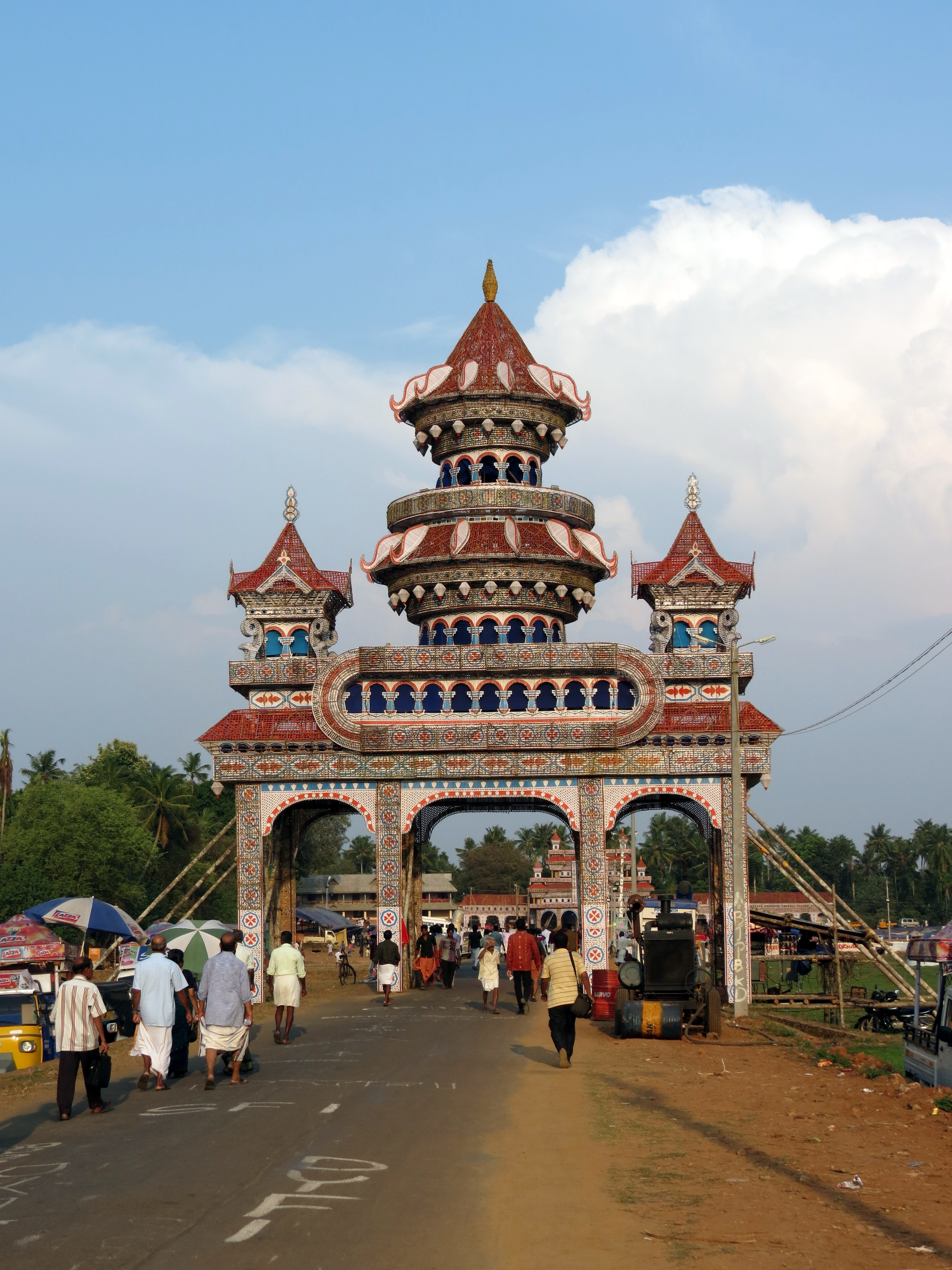
- Arattupuzha Pooram
- Interactive map of Arattupuzha
- Coordinates: 10.4327900°N 76.2262200°E
- Country: India
- State: Kerala
- District: Thrissur

Government
  - Body: Vallachira Grama Panchayath

Languages
  - Official: Malayalam, English
- Time zone: UTC+5:30 (IST)
- Vehicle registration: KL-
- Nearest city: Puthukkad
- Lok Sabha constituency: Thrissur
- Website: www.arattupuzhatemple.com

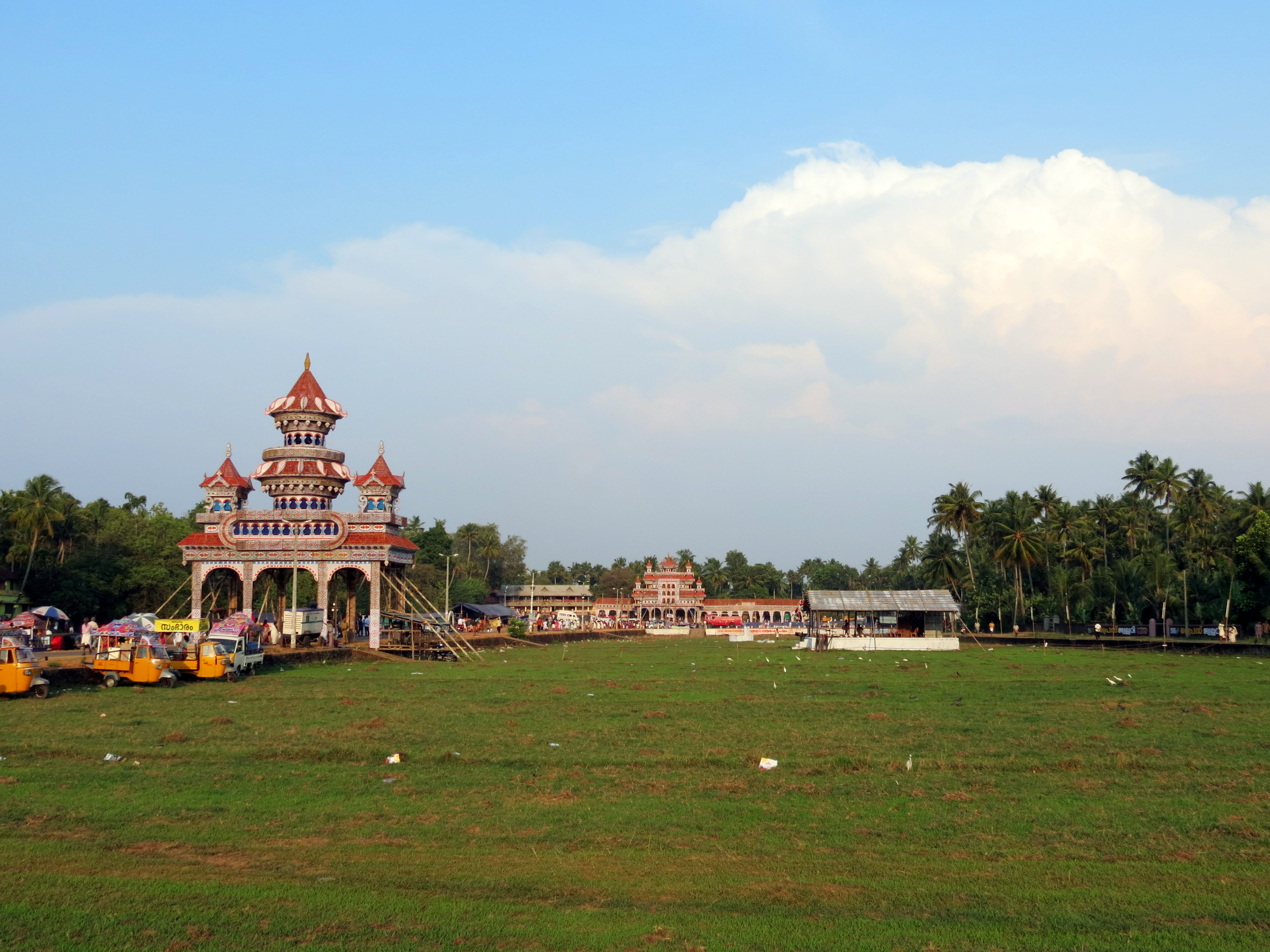
Arattupuzha Pooram

Arattupuzha is a cultural village in the Thrissur district of Kerala, South India, approximately 12 kilometres (7.5 mi) south of the town of Thrissur.

Located on the banks of the Karuvannur river, Arattupuzha is home to the annual Arattupuzha Pooram that stages the grand spectacle of numerous caparisoned elephants lined up in a row to the accompaniment of ethnic percussion concerts. Firework displays are also part of the celebration. The Arattupuzha Sastha Temple is located in Arattupuzha. The temple dates back 3000 years.
