= Temple festivals of Kerala =

Special festivals observed in temples of Kerala

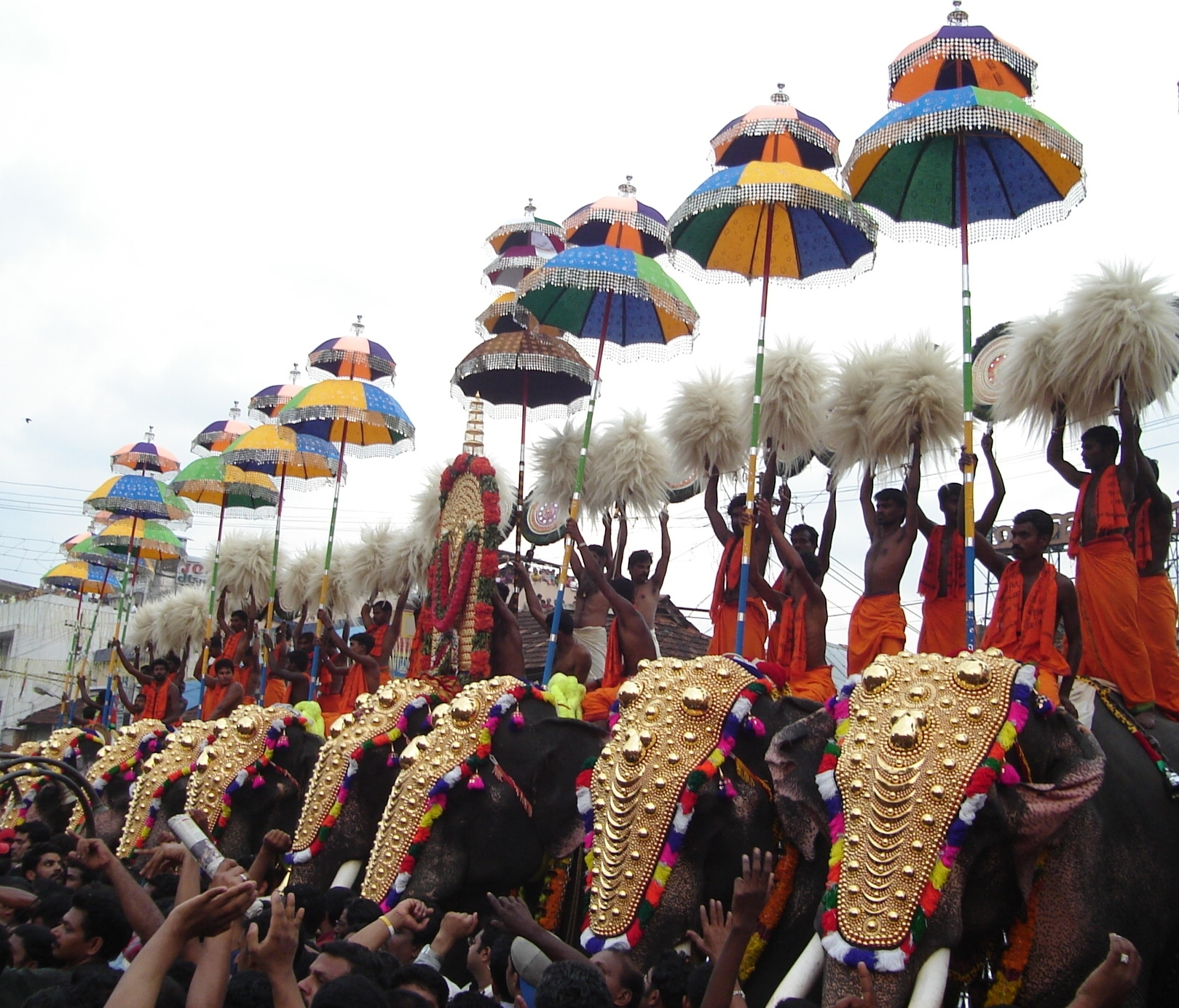
Thrissur Pooram

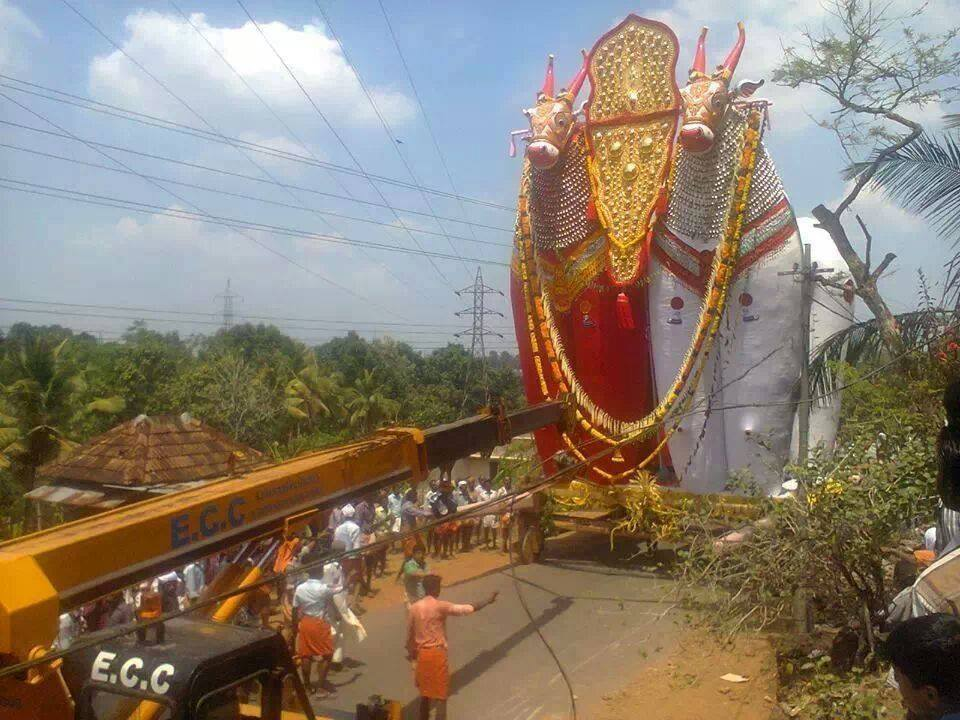
View of a huge Sivarathri

Kerala, a state in southwestern India, has many Hindu temples. Many of the temples have unique traditions and most hold festivals on specific days of the year. Temple festivals usually continue for a number of days. A common characteristic of these festivals is the hoisting of a holy flag which is then brought down only on the final day of the festival. The largest festival in kerala in Pooram category is Arattupuzha Pooram at Arattupuzha temple and in Ulsavam category is Vrishchikolsavam of Thripunithura Sree Poornathrayeesa Temple. Some festivals include the most famous of these being the Thrissur Pooram. Temples that can afford it will usually involve at least one richly caparisoned elephant as part of the festivities. The idol of the God in the temple is taken out on a procession around the countryside atop this elephant. When the procession visits homes around the temple, people will usually present rice, coconuts and other offerings to the God. Processions often include traditional music such as Panchari melam or Panchavadyam. The festivals of Kerala are famous around the globe due to its diversity of experience.

== Major temple festivals ==
Common religio-cultural festivals celebrated all across Kerala are:

| Festival | Date^ |
|---|---|
| Arattupuzha Pooram | March/April |
| Vishu | April 14/15 |
| Mahashivaratri | February/March |
| Krishna Janmashtami | August/September |
| Navaratri | September/October |
| Deepavali | October/November |

^In Kerala, festival dates are decided in accordance with the
Malayalam calendar and the local traditions and customs.
Overlapping Gregorian calendar months are used instead.

The major temple festivals of Kerala are:

| Festival | Venue |
|---|---|
| Vrishchikotsavam | Sree Poornathrayeesa, Tripunithura |
| Arattupuzha Pooram | Arattupuzha, Thrissur |
| Makaravilakku | Sabarimala, Pathanamthitta |
| Attukal Pongala | Attukal Temple, Thiruvananthapuram |
| Vrishchikotsavam | Sree Poornathrayeesa Temple |
| Kaaliyootu | Major Vellayani Devi Temple |
| Utsavams | Padmanabhaswamy Temple, Thiruvananthapuram |
| Ashtami | Vaikom Temple, Kodungalloor Bharani |
| Chembai Sangeetholsavam | Guruvayoor |
| Chettikulangara Kumbha Bharani | Chettikulangara Devi Temple, Mavelikara |
| Maha Shivaratri | Aluva Temple, Maradu |
| Maha Shivaratri | Padanilam Parabrahma Temple, Mavelikkara |
| Ponkalamaholsavam | Anikkattilammakshethram, Mallappally |
| Thiruvabharana Ghoshayathra | Valiyakoickal Temple, Pandalam |
| Vela | Nenmara, Vallanghy |
| Cheriyanad Pallivilakk Kettukazhcha Ratholsavam | Cheriyanad Balasubramanya temple, Cheriyanad, Alappuzha |
| Kalpathi Ratholsavam | Kalpathi, Palakkad |
| Adoor Gajamela | Sree Parthasarathy Temple, Pathanamthitta |
| Thaipooyam Mahotsavam | Sree Subrahmanya Swamy Temple, Harippad, Cheriyanad Balasubramanya temple |
| Thaipooyam Mahotsavam, Koorkancherry | Koorkancherry Sree Maheswara Temple, Thrissur |
| Machattu Mamangam | Machattu Thiruvanikavu Temple, Thrissur |
| Ezhara Ponnana | Ettumanoor Mahadeva Temple, Kottayam |
| Mannarasala Ayilyam | Sree Nagaraja Temple, Mannarasala, Alappuzha |
| Ayilyam Festival at Vettikode | Sree Nagaraja Swami Temple, Alappuzha |
| Ochira Kali | Ochira Parabrahma Temple, Kollam |
| Malanada Kettukazcha | Poruvazhi Malanada Temple, Kollam |
| Kodungallur Kavutheendal and Bharani | Kodungallur Bhagavathy Temple, Thrissur |
| Thirunakkara Arattu | Thirunakkara Mahadeva Temple, Kottayam |
| Pisharikav Kaaliyattom | Pisharikavu Temple, Koyilandy |
| Sakthikulangara Kunchachamman's Aaratt | Sakthikulangara Sree Dharma Shasta Temple, Kollam |
| Vairankode Vela (Theeyattulsavam) | Vairankode Bhagavathy Temple, Malappuram |
