= Urakam, Thrissur =

- Neighbourhood
- Urakam, Thrissur, Kerala
- Coordinates: 10.4274°N 76.2160°E
- Country: India
- State: Kerala
- District: Thrissur
- Elevation: 32.39 m (106.3 ft)

Languages
  - Official: Malayalam, English
  - Speech: Malayalam, English
- Time zone: UTC+5:30 (IST)
- PIN: 680562
- Other Neighbourhoods: Elthuruth, Cherpu, Pallissery, Ettumana, Kolliparambu
- LS: Thrissur
- VS: Nattika

Urakam or Oorakam is a neighbourhood near Cherpu in Thrissur of Kerala state in the peninsular India.

== Location ==
It is located with the geographic coordinates of 10.4274°N 76.2160°E at an altitude of about 32.39 metres (106.3 ft) above the mean sea level.

Urakam, Thrissur (Kerala)

== Religion ==
There is a Hindu temple dedicated to Durga viz., Ammathiruvadi Temple situated at Urakam.
