= Poovattoor Bhagavathy Temple =

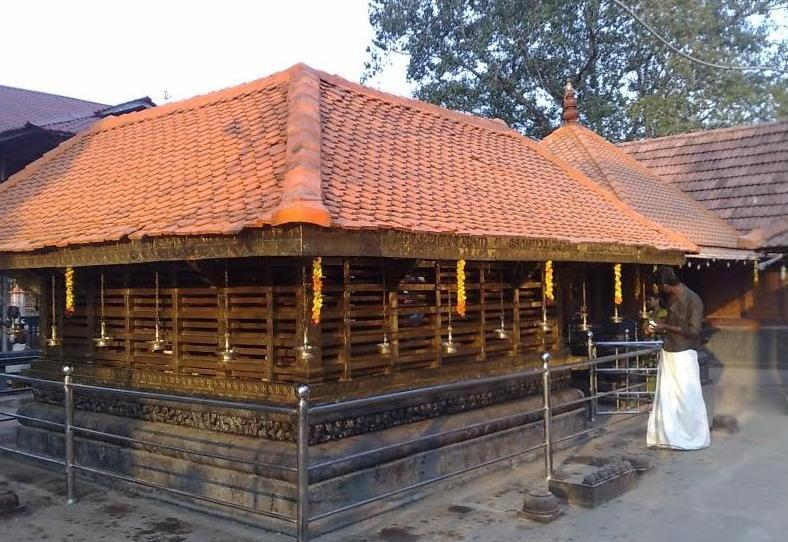

- Bhagavathy Temple, Poovattoor, Kollam, Kerala

Religion
- Affiliation: Hinduism
- District: Kollam
- Deity: Bhagavathy

Location
- Location: Poovattoor
- State: Kerala
- Country: India
- Interactive map of Poovattoor Bhagavathy Temple
- Coordinates: 9°03′18.0″N 76°44′58.2″E

Architecture
- Type: Architecture of Kerala

Specifications
- Temple: One
- Elevation: 49.55 m (163 ft)

Poovattoor Bhagavathy Temple is a temple in Poovattoor, Kollam, Kerala, India.

== Location ==
This temple is located at an altitude of about 49.55 m above the mean sea level with the geographic coordinates of 9°03′18.0″N 76°44′58.2″E.
