= Kanjirakode =

- village
- Location in Kerala, India Kanjirakode (India)
- Coordinates: 10°40′0″N 76°13′0″E
- Country: India
- State: Kerala
- District: Thrissur
- Talukas: Talappilly

Government
  - Type: Panchayati raj (India)
  - Body: Gram panchayat

Languages
  - Official: Malayalam, English
- Time zone: UTC+5:30 (IST)
- PIN: 680590
- Vehicle registration: KL-

Kanjirakode is a village in Thrissur district in the state of Kerala, India.
