= Arattupuzha Temple =

Hindu temple in Kerala, India

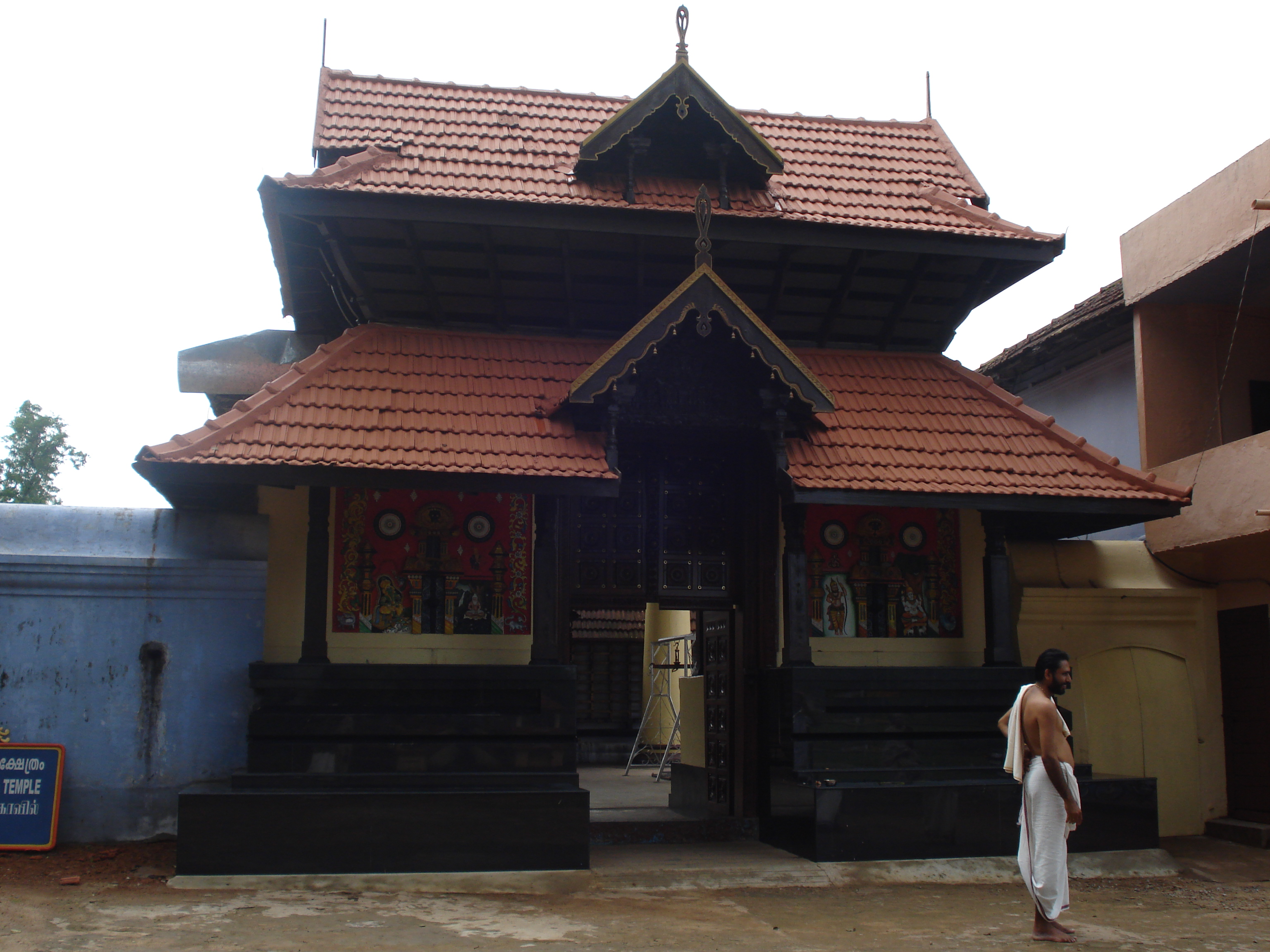

- Sree Sastha Temple, Arattupuzha, Thrissur, Kerala

Religion
- Affiliation: Hinduism
- District: Thrissur
- Deity: DHARMASASTHA & VASISHTA
- Festival: Devamela Arattupuzha Pooram

Location
- Location: Arattupuzha
- State: Kerala
- Country: India
- Interactive map of Arattupuzha Temple
- Coordinates: 10.418398°N 76.230039°E

Architecture
- Type: Architecture of Kerala

Specifications
- Temple: One
- Elevation: 28.39 m (93 ft)

The Arattupuzha Sastha Temple is a Hindu temple situated at Arattupuzha in Thrissur district of Kerala in India, administered by Cochin Devaswom Board.

== History ==
According to legends, the antiquity of this temple dates back to 3000 years. The temple has been the host of the most ancient and well-known yearly Devamela, a festival when all gods and goddesses assemble at Arattupuzha.

Sree Dharam Sastha is the main deity in the temple. It is believed that the deity of Arattupuzha temple contains the divine vital force of Guru Vasishta, the kulaguru (Family priest) of Raghu vamsha and Master of Srirama and his brothers.
