= Palissery =

- village
- Location in Kerala, India
- Coordinates: 10°28′25″N 76°13′10″E
- Country: India
- State: Kerala
- District: Thrissur

Population (2001)
  - Total: 7,950

Languages
  - Official: Malayalam, English
- Time zone: UTC+5:30 (IST)

Palissery is a census town in Thrissur district in the Indian state of Kerala.

== Demographics ==
As of 2001 India census, Palissery had a population of 7950. Males constitute 48% of the population and females 52%. Palissery has an average literacy rate of 84%, higher than the national average of 59.5%: male literacy is 86%, and female literacy is 82%. In Palissery, 11% of the population is under 6 years of age.

== Education ==
Famous college SCMS School of Engineering and Technology is situated near Palissery. This college is rated as among top University college by India Today.
