= Vashisht, Himachal Pradesh =

Vashisht
- Village
- Vashisht Temple
- Nicknames: Vashisht, Vashishta, Vashishat, Vasist, Bashisht, Basist
- Vashisht shown within Himachal Pradesh Vashisht (India)
- Coordinates: 32°15′32″N 77°11′24″E
- Country: India
- State: Himachal Pradesh
- District: Kullu
- Town: Manali
- Established: 3500 BC
- Founder: Guru Vashisht
- Named for: Vashistha Clan
- Elevation: 2,050 m (6,730 ft)

Languages
  - Official: Hindi
  - Regional: Kullui

Vashisht is a village in Kullu district, Himachal Pradesh, India. It is a popular tourist place.

Vashisht is a village located 3 km from Manali across the River Beas. This village is famous for its sulphurous hot water springs and sanctified by three main temples dedicated to Lord Vashisht, Lord Shiva and Lord Rama built just next to the springs. The water from this spring is believed to have great healing powers, which can cure many skin diseases, infections and pains. There are separate baths for men and women. This place has a refreshing atmosphere that allows one to indulge in a holy bath while seeking blessing from the presiding deity of the village.

The road to the village from Manali is bordered by shops and restaurants selling food, clothing, and tourist goods. Beyond the hot springs are local houses and a school. Above the main part of the village are many local houses and apple orchards.

== Jogini Falls and Temple ==
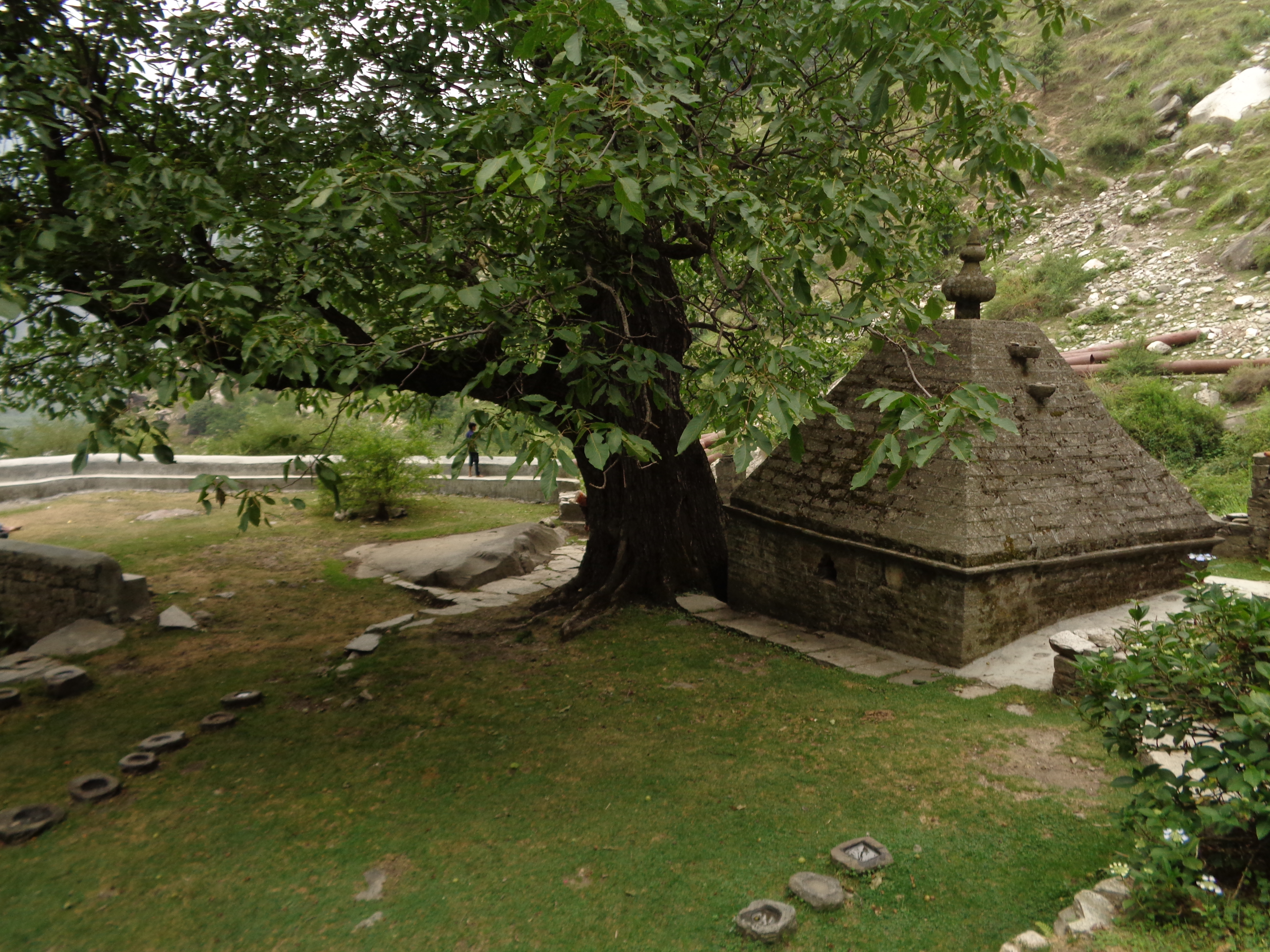
Jogini Mata Temple near Jogini Waterfall

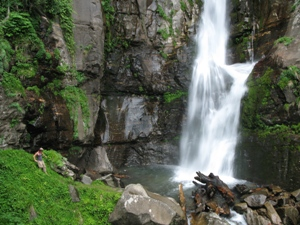
Jogini Falls

Jogini Falls is a waterfall located to the north of Vashisht village, marking its upper boundary. The waterfall descends approximately 150 feet in multiple tiers and is accessible via a short trek from the village through orchards and forested slopes. At the base of the falls lies a small shrine dedicated to Jogini Mata, a local deity, making the site both a natural attraction and a place of religious significance. The falls and the temple are commonly visited together with the Vashisht hot springs as part of a local pilgrimage and tourist route.
