= Vashishta Dharmasutra =

Ancient Hindu text

Vashishta Dharmasutra is an ancient legal text, and one of the few Dharma-related treatises which has survived into the modern era. This Dharmasūtra (300–100 BCE) forms an independent text and other parts of the Kalpasūtra, that is Shrauta and Grihya-sutras are missing. It contains 1,038 sutras.

== Translations ==
Vashisht Dharmsutra has been translated by:

- Georg Bühler
