= Ammathiruvadi Temple =

Hindu temple in Kerala, India

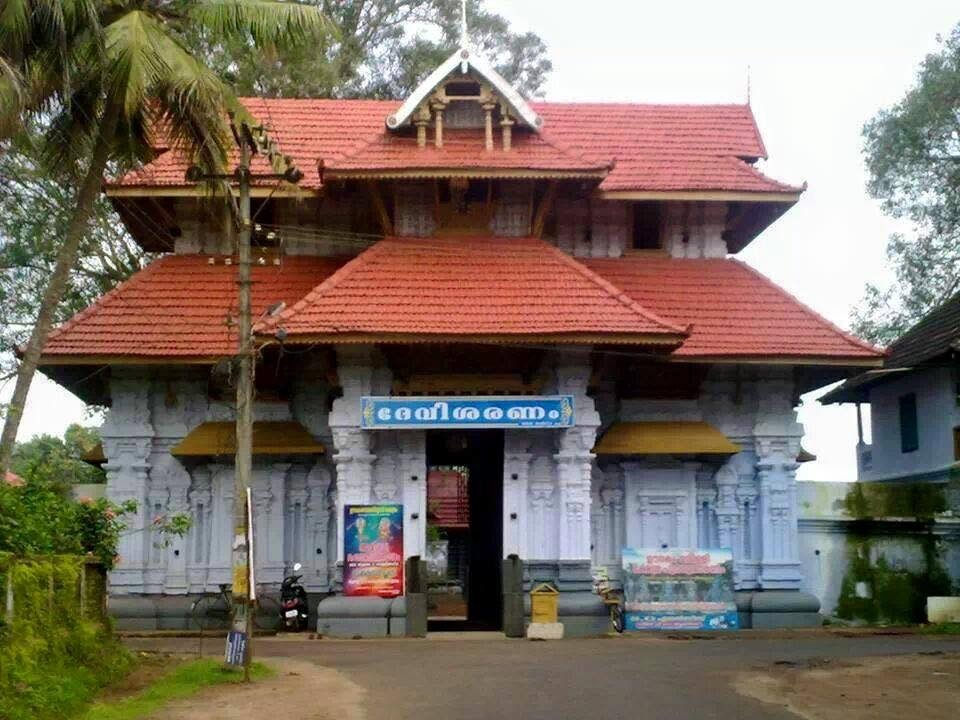

Religion
- Affiliation: Hinduism
- District: Thrissur District
- Deity: Durga
- Festival: Navaratri

Location
- Location: Urakam
- State: Kerala
- Country: India

Architecture
- Type: Kerala

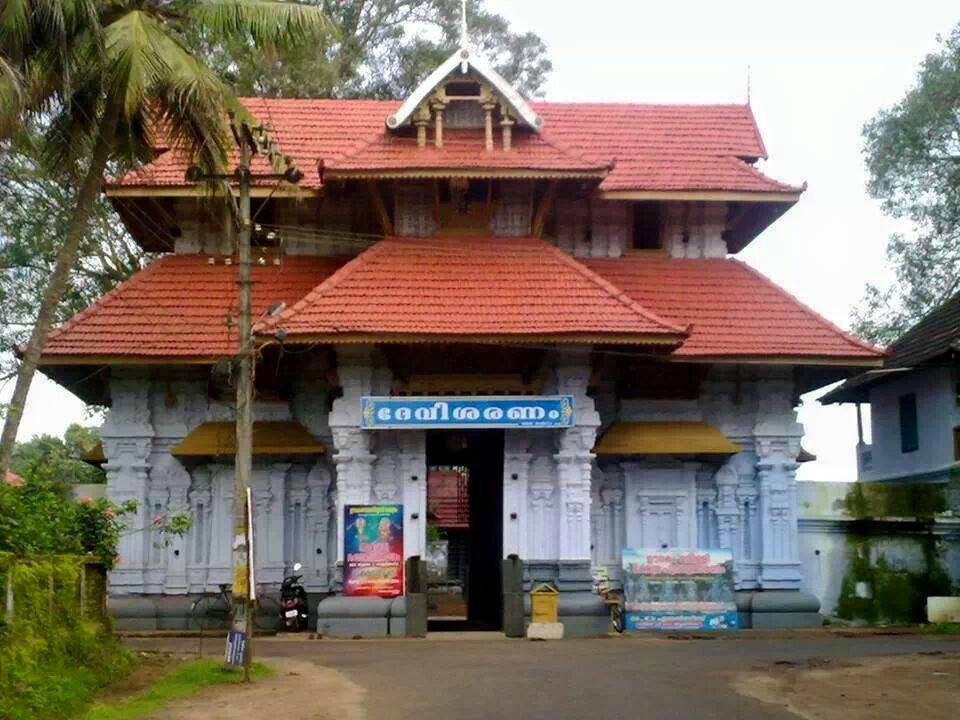
Urakam Ammathiruvadi Temple

Ammathiruvadi Temple is an ancient temple in Urakam, Kerala, India. It is located approximately 11 kilometres (6.8 mi) from the Thrissur railway station.

The temple is one of the 108 temples in Kerala dedicated to the goddess Durga. Its precise age is unclear, but it is believed to be approximately 1100 years old.

Urakam Ammathiruvadi Temple is an architectural marvel with its majestic Rajagopuram (ornamental gateways), Mathilkettu (compound walls), ootupura (feeding hall), nalambalam (building immediately surrounding the sanctum sanctorum), the double storied Shrikovil (sanctum sanctorum) and the serene atmosphere maintained at the inner temple.

The Valayadheeswari Temple or the more popularly known as Ammathiruvadi Temple of Urakam is the foremost of the 108 Durgaalayams (durga Temples) of Kerala. According to the Puraanaas, Kerala was reclaimed by Lord Parasurama, the sixth avatar of Mahavishnu, from sea by throwing his parasu (axe) from Kanyakumari to Gokarna and divided this land to 64 gramas. He realized that for the prosperity and well-being of this Bhargava Land, it was essential to have the benign blessings of Durga and identified 108 places for the temple. The locations of these temples represent the scattered body parts of Sati Devi, the consort of Lord Paramasiva, cut into pieces by Mahavishnu with his chakra to pacify Siva after the incident-filled Dakshayaga.

History of Urakam Ammathiruvadi Temple :

According to the Kerala folklore, Poomulli Namboothiri (also sometimes referred to as Thiruvalayannur Bhattathiri) founded Ammathiruvadi temple about 700–1000 years ago. The temple site was once the location of the Namboothiri's household. Ūrakam was then a part of the Peruvanam village (one of the 64 villages of ancient Kerala).

Legend has it that, due to the atrocities and calamities happening within the Desham, elders suggested three prominent members from the community, viz, Valaya Bhattathiri, Kadalayil Namboothiri and then Komarathu Menon to travel to Kancheepuram and pray to goddess Kanchi Kamakshi and then please her and bring favourable solutions to ward off the evil effects happening that time. They all went and pleased with their prayers, happy with the devotion, Devi agreed to come with them to Urakam. Accordingly, Kanchi Kamakshi decided to come to Kerala on the palm leaf umbrella of Poomulli (Valayannur) Namboothiri. He reached home and placed the umbrella on the floor of his house. After a short nap, he came back and found that he was unable to take back the umbrella from the place where he kept. It was heavily grounded to the floor. Later upon further investigation it was confirmed that Kanchi Kamakshi was residing on that umbrella. The goddess came in Namboothiri's dreams that night and let him know that he was supposed to build a temple for the goddess, and leave Ūrakam towards North. She also let him know that he was to find an idol in a well far away and reinstate the goddess from the umbrella onto that idol. Namboothiri did as the goddess wished. He built the temple, after a short period of administration of the temple matters by the Poomulli family, he left all that he owned to the temple, and gave the administration to the Maharaja of Cochin. From then on the goddess was known as the Ammathiruvadi.

Later on the temple administration was transferred to Cochin Devaswam Board, who takes care of it even now. Urakam Ammathiruvadi temple is an integral part of the 1400 year old Arattupuzha Pooram festival. Arrattuppuzha pooram is called as Deva Mela, where all the gods and goddesses assemble together in the presence of Thriprayar Thevar (Sri Rama), considered their head. According to the old customs continued by the family of Cochi Raja and then subsequently by the Kerala State, whenever, Ammathiruvadi travel outside the temple, i.e. for pooram or other festivals, she is supposed to be greeted with official "Guard of Honour" by the police. All festivities of this temple are taken care of a local committee with the guidance of Cochin Devaswom board.

Stories passed on from elders tell also that in those days, the idol installed by Poomulli Namboothiri was originally the Devi idol worshiped by Sri Rama before he went to war with Ravana. There are several historic connections one get to see in places nearer to Oorakam, supporting the claim that the village was part of ancient Hindu history. Due to the same connections, this village and all the adjacent villages carry a divine and prosperous aura throughout. Agricultural and other activities always flourish here.

It is also said that one family close to the temple became so devoted to the Devi that she was pleased with their bhakthi and from then on, the eldest member of this family - Vazhappilly - became the guard of Ammathiruvadi and wherever she goes, she will be accompanied by this member. This continues even now.

Since she came to Urakam on an umbrella made of palm leaf, whenever Ammathiruvadi's idol is carried out, it will be accompanied by a person carrying an umbrella made of palm leaf.

Festivals :

Ammathiruvadi Temple conducts five famous festivals annually. These are the Navaratri, Thrikkarthika, Pooram, Illam Nira and Vavarat. The Navarathri is a nine-day festival which is celebrated very grandly. This temple is decorated with lights, sounds and by flowers. The Thrikkarthika festival is celebrated as the birthday of Ammathiruvadi. On this occasion the goddess is dressed in silk cloths and adorns the temple jewels. The temple elephants are also decorated and take them for procession. The important feature of this festival is the grand feast given o more than 15,000 people's very year whoever comes on this festival occasion. It is said that, no one should go out of this temple with an empty stomach. The Pooram is an important event for cultural programs. This is a 13-day festival grandly celebrated with temple elephants and percussions. The festival is worth to enjoy as one can see the art and culture truly with the religious sentiments of the locals.
