= Chittanda =

- village
- Location in Kerala, India Chittanda (India)
- Coordinates: 10.6844500°N 76.21069°E
- Country: India
- State: Kerala
- District: Thrissur

Population (2011)
  - Total: 5,936

Languages
  - Official: Malayalam, English
- Time zone: UTC+5:30 (IST)
- PIN: 680585
- Vehicle registration: KL-48
- Website: www.chittanda.com

Chittanda is a village in Thrissur district in the state of Kerala, India. The place is renowned for the Karthyayani temple. The temple is one among the 108 Durga temples consecrated by Lord Parashurama, the mythical founder of Kerala.

== Demographics ==
As of 2011 India census, Chittanda had a population of 5936 with 2821 males and 3115 females.
