= Arattupuzha Pooram =

Hindu festival in Kerala, India

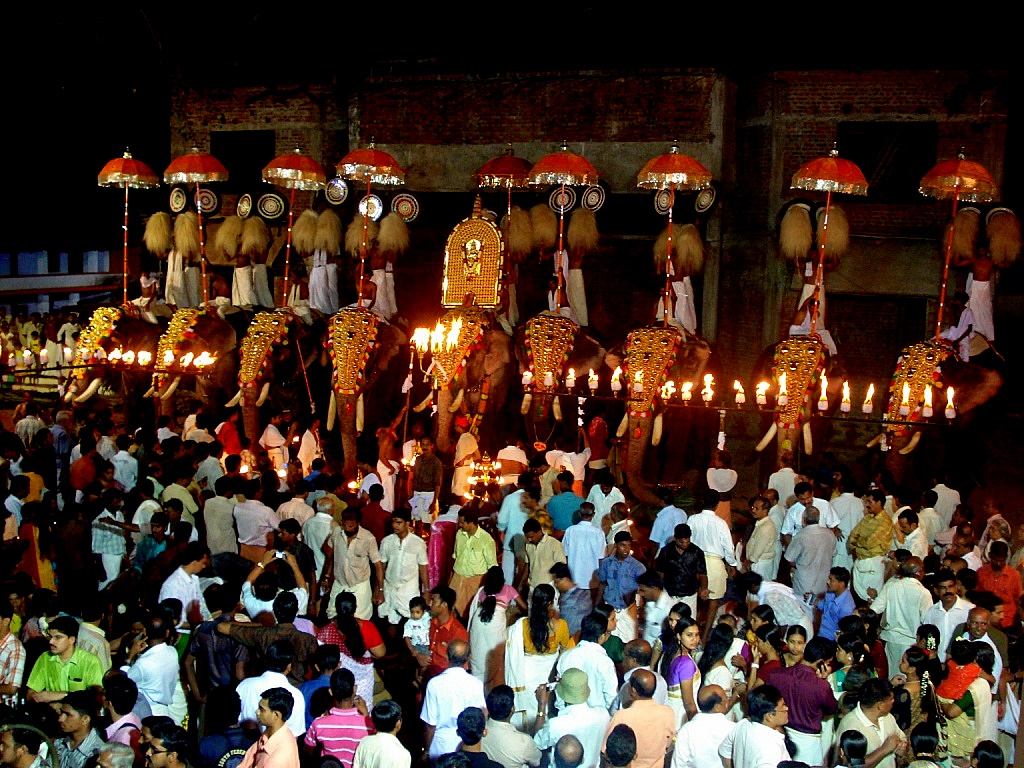
- Type: Temple Festival
- Observances: Temple Festival, Kudamatam, Fireworks (Vedikettu)
- Date: Makam Star Of Minam in the Malayalam calendar (March/April)

The oldest pooram (temple festival) in Kerala, the Arattupuzha Pooram, is held at the Arattupuzha Temple in Thrissur for a period of seven days each year. Believers say that at this 'conclave', all Gods and Goddesses gather during the time period of the Pooram. Visitors from nearby and far off places reach the village of Arattupuzha during the festival days. The pinnacle of the seven-day festival is the last two days. The evening prior to the last day of the festival would have an assembly of caparisoned elephants and staging of percussion ensembles as part of the ceremony called Sasthavinte Melam. The pancharimelam of Aarttupuzha Sasthavu is the largest assembly of percussion artists in any other night Poorams. More than 200 artists perform in sasthavinte melam. This can only be seen at Sree Poornathrayeesa Temple, Tripunithura other than in Arattupuzha Pooram

The Pooram is known as Devamela (Known as the ‘Mother of all Poorams’, its festivities are among the finest seen in Kerala as they represent such a wide variety of traditions from around the State) as it is a conglomeration of gods, given its massive attendance of deities from neighbourhood shrines. A total of 108 deities of various temples from different parts of Thrissur District attended the Pooram once But now only 23 deities attend the Pooram and is considered as the oldest temple festival in the Indian subcontinent. Important deities that participate in the Arattupuzha Pooram are Urakathamma Thiruvadi, Cherpu Bhagavathy and Triprayar Thevar.

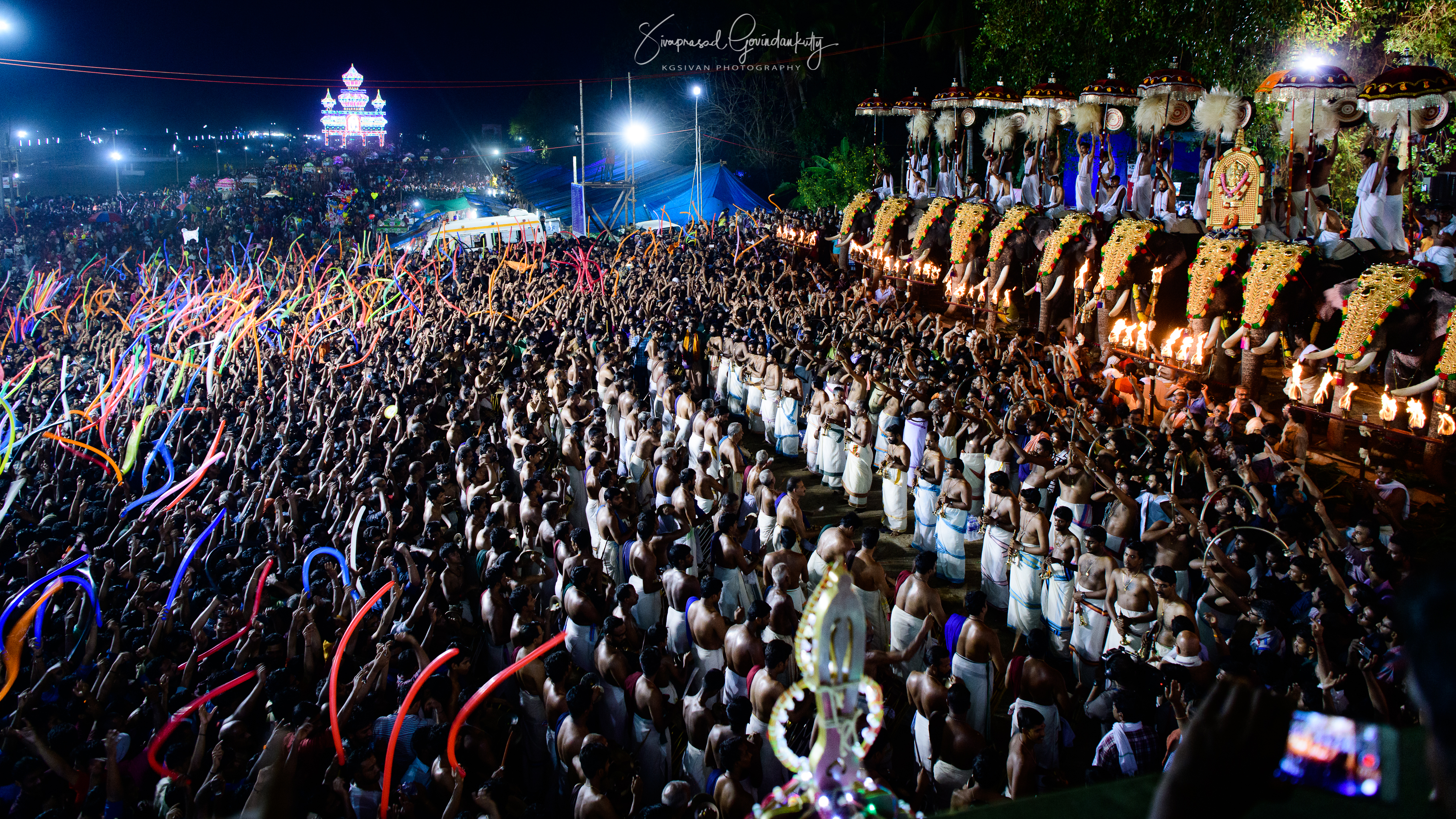
Celebrating Arattupuzha Pooram
