= List of individual elephants =

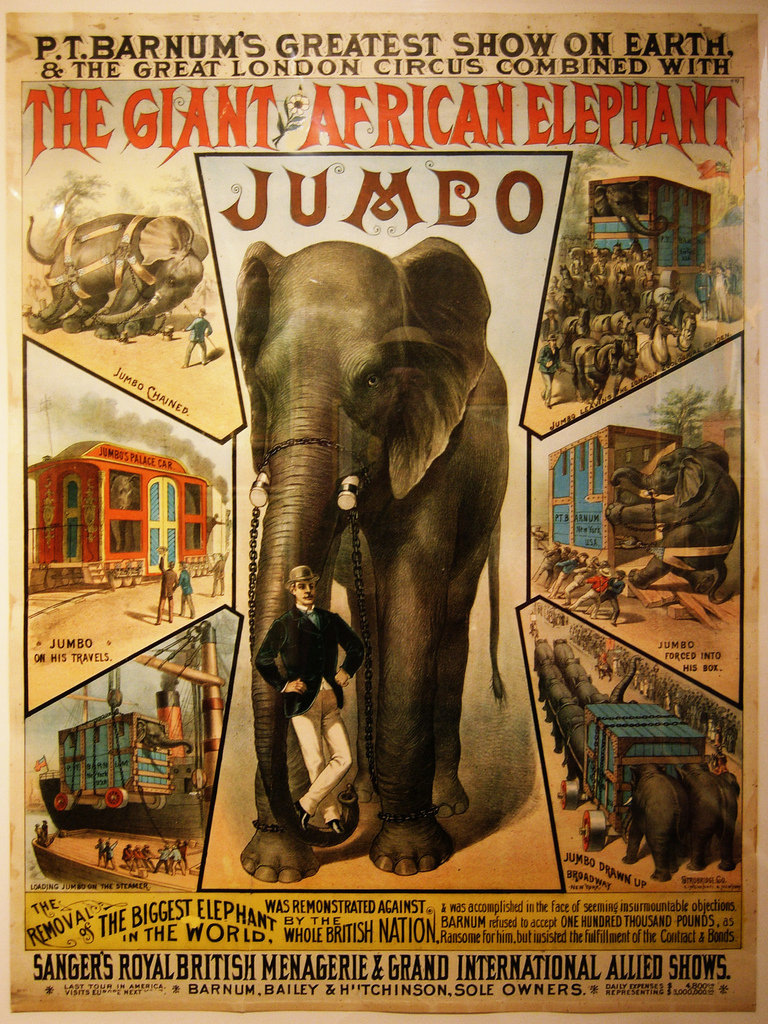
Circus poster of Jumbo, an African bush elephant famed for his exceptional size

The following is a list of culturally or scientifically notable elephants.

== Actors ==
- Chirakkal Kalidasan, one of the tallest elephants in Kerala, also notable for acting in some films, including the 2017 epic film, Baahubali 2: The Conclusion.
- Tai, known for featuring in the films The Jungle Book (1994), Larger than Life (1996), George of the Jungle (1997) and Water for Elephants (2011).

== Fame by proxy to owner ==
- Abul-Abbas, Charlemagne's elephant
- The Cremona elephant, given to Holy Roman Emperor Frederick II by the Sultan of Egypt in 1229.
- Elephant of Henry III (c. 1245–14 February 1257), given to Henry III of England by Louis IX of France.
- Hanno (1510-1516), pet elephant of Pope Leo X.
- Jayathu, elephant gifted by J. R. Jayewardene to Ronald Reagan in 1984.
- Shanthi, elephant gifted by Sri Lanka to Jimmy Carter and the American children in 1976.
- Suleiman the elephant, presented in 1551 to Maximilian II, the Holy Roman Emperor, by John III, the King of Portugal, and named after the Ottoman Sultan, Suleiman the Magnificent.

== Wild elephants ==
- Echo, matriarch who was called the "most studied elephant in the world, the subject of several books and documentaries, including two NATURE films".
- Isilo of Tembe Elephant Park was one of South Africa’s largest African elephants.
- Craig of Amboseli National Park was one of Kenya’s largest African elephants.
- Kongad Kuttisankaran, one of the few native elephants born in Kerala to have a height of more than 309 centimetres (122 in)
- Raja Gaj, bull elephant which lived in the Bardiya National Park, Nepal. He was considered to be one of the world's largest Asian elephants of modern times.
- Satao, one of the largest African elephants; he had unusually large tusks and was killed by poachers in 2014 who stole the ivory. (Another supertusker, named Satao 2 or Satao II, was killed in 2017, leaving six surviving supertuskers. Satao 2/Satao II's tusks were, however, intact, as the poachers did not have the chance to take them.)

== Working elephants ==
=== Circus elephants ===
- Fanny, former circus elephant that resided in Slater Park Zoo in Pawtucket, Rhode Island, from 1958 to 1993. She was moved to the Cleveland Amory Black Beauty Ranch sanctuary in 1993 because the city closed the zoo exhibits due to financial crises. She lived the last ten years of her life at the sanctuary and died in 2003. A statue to her memory stands in Slater Park.
- Hansken, female Sri Lankan elephant who toured many European countries from 1637 to 1655 demonstrating circus tricks.
- John L. Sullivan (c.1860–April 1932), boxing elephant in Adam Forepaugh's circus. In 1922, he made a pilgrimage from Madison Square Garden to the Elephant Hotel in Somers, New York, to pay tribute to the elephant "Old Bet", laying a wreath on her monument.
- Jumbo, P. T. Barnum's elephant whose name is the origin of the word jumbo (meaning "very large" or "oversized"). The African elephant was given the name Jumbo by zookeepers at the London Zoo. The name was most likely derived from the Swahili word jumbe meaning "chief".
- Lallah Rookh, elephant with Dan Rice's circus. She died of a fever in 1860 after swimming across the Ohio River.
- Mademoiselle D'Jeck, performed in plays in Europe and the United States in the 19th century
- Old Bet, early American circus elephant owned by Hachaliah Bailey. On 24 July 1816, she was shot and killed while on tour near Alfred, Maine, by a farmer who thought it was sinful for poor people to waste money on a traveling circus. Old Bet's owner responded by building a three-story memorial called the Elephant Hotel, which now serves as a town hall.
- Old Hannibal, part of Isaac A. Van Amburgh's menagerie.
- Salt and Sauce, considered the most famous British elephants of their era and mentioned in several circus books.
- Tillie, the mascot of the John Robinson Circus known for wintering and spending her retirement in Terrace Park, Ohio.
- Tusko, Asian elephant who resided at the Oregon Zoo in Portland from 2005 until his death in 2015.

=== Carrying elephants ===
- Balarama, preceded Arjuna; was the Golden Howdah-carrier between 1999 and 2011.
- Drona, one of the lead Dasara Elephants of the Jamboo Savari of Mysore Dasara; he carried the Golden Howdah for a record 18 years consecutive years between 1981 and 1997.
- Guruvayur Keshavan, Indian elephant associated with the Guruvayur temple in Kerala. The elephant was cited for exhibiting "extremely devout behaviour".
- Pampadi Rajan, one of the tallest elephants in Kerala.
- Paramekkavu Rajendran, elephant from Kerala who holds the record of participating in the most Thrissur Poorams for 50 years.

=== Trained/rescue elephants (kumki) ===
- Arjuna, trained rescue elephant with the Karnataka Forest Department who died in battle with a wild bull elephant; one or both may have been in musth. Arjuna was also a lead elephant of the Mysore Dasara procession who carried the idol of the deity Chamundeshwari on the Golden Howdah.
- Chinna Thambi (or Chinnathambi), a rogue crop-raider turned kumki, who succeeded kumki extraordinaire Kaleem, who retired after 99 successful missions.

=== War elephants ===
- Kandula, the royal war elephant of the Sri Lankan prince Dutugamunu in the 2nd century BC. The king and his elephant grew up together. (A Sri Lankan elephant which was born on 25 November 2001 at the National Zoo in Washington, D.C. is named after Kandula.)
- Lin Wang, Burmese elephant which served with the Chinese Expeditionary Force during the Sino-Japanese War (1937–1945) and later moved to Taiwan with the Kuomintang army. Lin Wang became a fond childhood memory among many Taiwanese. When he died at 86 years old in 2003, he was (and still is) the longest-living captive elephant.
- Maha Pambata, war elephant belonging to Tamil King Ellalan.
- Surus ("the Syrian"), mentioned as the bravest of Hannibal's 37 war elephants which crossed the Alps in 218 BC during the Second Punic War, by Cato the Elder in his book Origines.

== Notorious elephants ==
- Arikomban, a rogue elephant in Kerala; tranquillized by the Kerala wildlife department and herded into a truck using four kumki elephants and sent to the Periyar Tiger Reserve on 29 April 2023.
- Black Diamond, Indian elephant with Al G. Barnes Circus; killed four people and was subsequently shot dead in 1929.
- Dhurbe, wild elephant responsible for the deaths of at least 15 people; considered at large as of September 2025 although reportedly the same elephant was fitted with a radiocollar in Chitwan National Park.
- Kolakolli, Indian rogue elephant accused of killing 12 people in and around Peppara over a span of seven to eight years; caught and died in captivity in 2006.
- Mary (a.k.a. "Mighty Mary" and "Murderous Mary"), was a circus elephant who was executed on 13 September 1916 in Erwin, Tennessee. She was hanged by a railroad derrick car at the Clinchfield Railroad yard. This is the only known elephant hanging in history. Mary, who toured with the Sparks World Famous Shows circus, killed her inexperienced keeper, Walter "Red" Eldridge, on 12 September 1916 during a circus parade in nearby Kingsport, Tennessee. (Eldridge had supposedly hit Mary's tusk or ear when she wandered from the parade line to eat a piece of discarded watermelon.)
- Osama (or Usama) bin Laden – refers to at least three different killer elephants: the first was a rogue elephant which killed at least 27 people in India from 2004 until being shot dead in 2006. The second, blamed for killing 11 people, was killed in 2008. The last, also known as "Laden", killed 5 people before being caught and dying in captivity in 2019 from undisclosed causes.
- Padayappa, a wild elephant in Munnar known for its frequent incursions into residential areas.
- Rajje (1951?–1963), performing elephant that escaped into the streets of Lansing, Michigan, and was killed by gunfire.
- Topsy (c. 1875 – 4 January 1903), elephant who, in 1902, while with the Forepaugh Circus, killed a spectator who burned her trunk with a lit cigar. In 1903, the owners of Coney Island's Luna Park where she ended up claimed they could no longer keep her, culling her with poison, electrocution, and strangling. The Edison Manufacturing movie company shot a film of the execution called Electrocuting an Elephant.
- Tyke, circus elephant who, on 20 August 1994, in Honolulu, Hawaii, killed her trainer Allen Campbell and seriously injured her groomer, Dallas Beckwith, during a Circus International performance before hundreds of horrified spectators. Tyke then bolted from the arena and ran through downtown streets of Kakaako for more than 30 minutes. Police fired 86 shots at Tyke, who eventually collapsed from the wounds and died.

== Temple elephants ==
- Raja, elephant who carried the holiest Buddhist casket in the Kandy Esala Perahera.
- Chengalloor Dakshayani, an Asian female elephant who was owned by Travancore Devaswom Board and kept at the Chenkalloor Mahadeva Temple in Thiruvananthapuram in Kerala, India. At the time of her death on 5 February 2019, she was believed to be the oldest elephant in captivity in Asia, at approximately 88 years old.
- Thechikottukavu Ramachandran, an Indian elephant commonly known as simply Raman, as of 2025 he is the tallest living captive elephant in Asia, standing 3.2 meters. He plays a key role in several Pooram festivals. In 2018, 50,000 spectators gathered to watch Ramachandran kickstart Thrissur Pooram at Thrissur's Vadakkumnathan temple.
- Thiruvambadi Sivasundar, an Indian elephant who lived at the Thiruvambadi Sri Krishna Temple in Thrissur, Kerala.
- Thrikkadavoor Sivaraju, one of the tallest elephants from Kerala.
- Heiyantuduwa Raja, carried the Relic of the tooth of the Buddha in Kandy Esala Perahera, from 1989 to 2000.
- Kataragama Wasana, a Sri Lankan tusker that belongs to the Kataragama Temple in Kataragama, Sri Lanka and the occasional Main casket bearer of the Kandy Esala Perahera.
- Millangoda Raja, believed to be the longest-tusked Asian elephant during his lifetime. Main casket bearer of the Kandy Esala Perahera from 1998 to 2008
- Nadungamuwa Raja, main casket bearer of the Kandy Esala Perahera, from 2005 to 2021.
- Indi Raja, Main casket bearer of the Kandy Esala Perahera since 2022.
- Tikiri, participated in the Kandy Esala Perahera.

== Zoo elephants ==
- Bamboo, lived at the Woodland Park Zoo for many years and was the center of a campaign to have her moved to a sanctuary.
- Batyr, the "talking elephant" of Karagandy Zoo in Kazakhstan.
- Burma, lived in New Zealand's Auckland Zoo from 1990 to 2024, when she was moved to Monarto Safari Park.
- Castor and Pollux, served as food to the wealthy citizens of Paris during the siege in 1870.
- Chunee (or Chuny), elephant in the menagerie at the Exeter Exchange; executed by soldiers from Somerset House on 1 March 1826 after he became ungovernable. He had killed a handler in 1825.
- The Dundee Elephant, exhibited in Europe in the 17th and 18th centuries.
- Dunk, first elephant to reside at the National Zoo in the United States.
- Gabi, male Asian elephant who was born in 2005 at the Jerusalem Biblical Zoo; first elephant in Israel conceived via artificial insemination.
- Gita, whose death at the Los Angeles Zoo in 2006 sparked public outcry.
- Gold Dust, one of the first elephants to reside at the National Zoo in the United States.
- Hanako, an elephant who lived by herself at Inokashira Park Zoo.
- Hattie of New York City's Central Park Zoo, in 1903 was described as the "most intelligent of all elephants".
- Kaavan, subject to a lengthy but ultimately successful campaign to be moved from the Islamabad Zoo in Pakistan to a sanctuary in Cambodia after the death of his companion.
- Kamala, Asian elephant who lived at Canada's Calgary Zoo and the United States National Zoological Park.
- Kashin, Asian elephant from New Zealand, famous for being sponsored by ASB Bank, and featured in the New Zealand-produced television programme The Zoo.
- Kosik, able to imitate a number of Korean words.
- Madhubala, female African elephant at the Karachi Zoo in Pakistan; one of the last four captive elephants in Pakistan (along with Noor Jehan, Malika and Sonu).
- Mali (died 2023), held alone for most of her life at the Manila Zoo in the Philippines until her death.
- Mangalamkunnu Karnan, a famous elephant in Kerala known for his ability to hold the heads-up for a long time; he also appeared in three films (Malayalam & Bollywood).
- Miss Jim, "The First Lady of the St. Louis Zoo", was the zoo's first elephant, and a star attraction from 1916 to 1948.
- Mona, euthanized on 21 June 2007, at the Birmingham Zoo in Birmingham, Alabama. Thought, at age 60, to have been the oldest Asian elephant in the United States. After the death of her companion, Susie, Mona's health and living conditions were the subject of a long campaign to have her transferred out of the zoo to a sanctuary.
- Noor Jehan, female African elephant who died at the Karachi Zoo in Pakistan in 2023; one of the last four captive elephants in Pakistan (along with Madhubala, Malika and Sonu).
- Packy (1962–2017), resident of Oregon Zoo (formerly Washington Park Zoo, originally Portland Zoo) in Portland, Oregon. First Asian elephant born in the Western Hemisphere in 44 years. At his death, he was the patriarch of the zoo's herd and had sired seven offspring.
- Pang Pha, an Asian elephant at the Berlin Zoo known for being able to peel bananas.
- Queenie (died 1944), gave rides for children at the Melbourne Zoo for 40 years.
- Rose-Tu, Asian elephant at the Oregon Zoo in Portland, Oregon.
- Rosie the Elephant, famous for promoting Miami Beach, Florida.
- Ruby (1973–1998), Asian elephant artist who resided at the Phoenix Zoo. She was known for creating paintings; the most expensive of which sold for $25,000.
- Tricia, Asian elephant who resided at Perth Zoo between 1963 until her death at age 65 in 2022. She was one of the world's oldest Asian elephants.
- Ziggy, a famously rebellious elephant at Brookfield Zoo.

== Other ==
- Motola, an Asian elephant in Thailand who stepped on a landmine in 1999; survived and walked on three legs for a number of years until she was fitted with a prosthetic foot.
- Motty, only confirmed Asian/African hybrid elephant; survived for just 10 days at the Chester Zoo in England.
- Queenie (1952–2011), noted in the late 1950s and early 1960s for waterskiing for entertainment in the United States.
- Tuffi, young female elephant who fell from Wuppertal's suspended monorail into the river Wupper in Germany on 21 July 1950; she survived the fall.

== Longevity claims ==
- Kottoor Soman, retired kumki born circa 1942, was incorrectly represented to be the oldest-living elephant in the world in 2020. In fact, the longest-known lived elephant in the world at the time (and to date) was Vatsala, a female elephant who lived in the Panna Tiger Reserve in Madhya Pradesh, India. Vatsala died on 9 July 2025, believed to be at least 100 years old.
- Yoyo, African elephant resident of the Barcelona Zoo, who, at her death in 2024 at 54 years of age, was purported to be the longest-living captive African elephant.

== See also ==
- List of fictional pachyderms
- List of elephants in mythology and religion
- Cultural depictions of elephants
- Elephant Encyclopedia
