= Chirakkal Kalidasan =

Elephant in Kerala

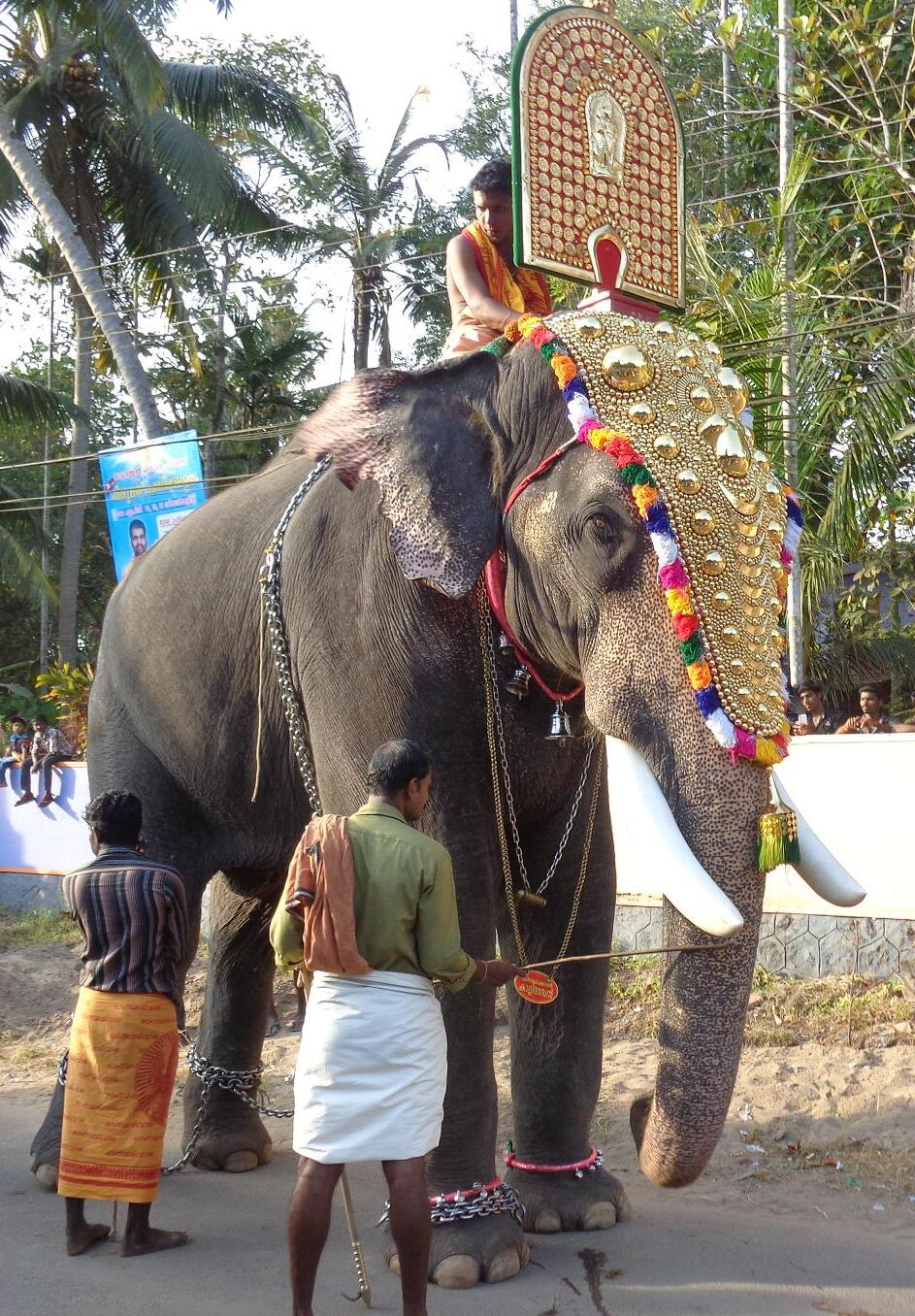
- Species: Elephas maximus (Asian elephant)
- Sex: Male
- Born: c. 1980; Karnataka
- Nationality: India
- Known for: Thrissur Pooram Baahubali 2
- Owner: Chirakkal Madhu
- Height: 308 cm (10 ft 1 1/2 in)
- Named after: Kalidasan

Chirakkal Kalidasan (born c. 1980) is an Asian elephant. He is the third tallest elephant in India. He is famous for his huge fan base and had a major role in the 2017 epic film, Baahubali 2: The Conclusion. He is also known as Gajaraja Bahubali.

Chirakkal Kalidasan stands at 308 cm (10 ft 1 1/2 in), making him the third tallest captive elephant in the state after Thechikottukavu Ramachandran and Thrikkadavoor Sivaraju. He is also known for having won in Thalappokkam (heads-up) competitions.

== Early life ==
Kalidasan was born in the wild Karnataka forests. He was brought to Kerala by Manissey Hari and was later bought by Chirakkal Madhu in the 2000s.

== Recognition ==
Kalidasan is a star elephant in Malayalam cinema.

=== Movies ===
Kalidasan is known for acting in movies, notably in the 2017 epic film, Baahubali 2: The Conclusion. He has also acted in the movies Pattabhishekham, Punyalan Agarbattis and Dil Se...

=== Video album ===
In 2018, he acted in a musical video called "Gajam", sung by Vijay Yesudas.

=== Others ===
In 2020, he became a part of the promo video by Indian Super League club Kerala Blasters.

In the early 2010s, he was given the name Junior Thechikkot by elephant lovers.

Kalidasan is also known for taking part in photoshoots with actors and models.

== See also ==
- Chengalloor Dakshayani
- List of individual elephants
