= Paramekkavu Rajendran =

Famous elephant lived in Kerala

- Species: Elephas maximus (Asian Elephant)
- Sex: Male
- Born: c. 1943; Nilambur forest, Kerala
- Died: 15 October 2019; Paramekkavu
- Nationality: India
- Known for: Thrissur Pooram, other Poorams
- Owner: Paramekkavu Bagavathi Temple
- Height: 3.06 m (10 ft 0 in)
- Named after: Rajendran

Paramekkavu Rajendran (c. 1943 — 15 October 2019) was an elephant from Kerala, who holds the record of participating in the most number of Thrissur Poorams for more than 50 years.

Unlike other elephants in those days which are brought to Kerala from other states, Rajendran belonged to the Nilambur forests and a typical Keralite as far as its features are concerned. Rajendran was fondly called among the elephant lovers as 'Rajumon' and was believed to have resemblance with the historic elephant Guruvayur Kesavan, especially the big broad ears. Rajendran was offered to the temple at the age of 12 after its former priest Venad Parameswaran Namboothiri collected Rs.4000 from the devotees to offer Rajendran to the Paramekkavu Bhagavathy in 1955. He became a part of Thrissur Pooram since 1967. Rajendran is a unique elephant for his experience of participating in Asian Games (Asiad) in 1982. He was part of the 34-member group of elephants taken from Thrissur to Delhi for the 1982 Asian Games opening ceremony. The elephant is also known for carrying the idol of various deities in and around Thrissur district during the annual festivals, especially Arattupuzha-Peruvanam Pooram. Due to age related problems, Rajendran died on 15 October 2019.

== See also ==
- List of individual elephants
