= Thrikkadavoor Sree Mahadeva Temple =

Hindu temple in Kerala, India

- തൃക്കടവൂർ ശ്രീ മഹാദേവ ക്ഷേത്രം
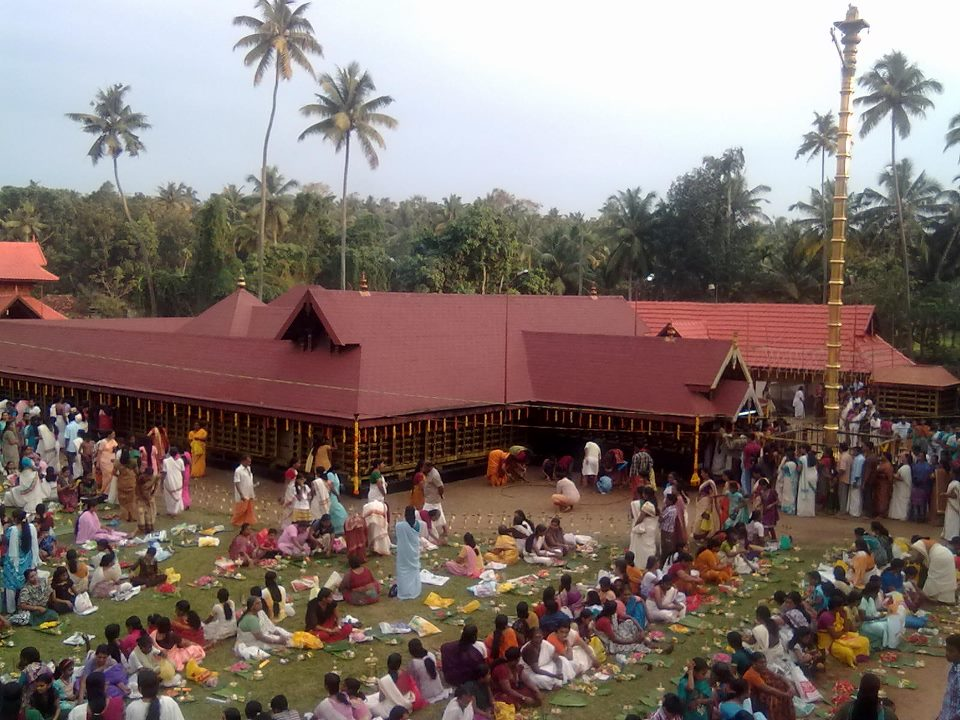
- The temple and its golden flagstaff during a festival

- Location in Kerala

Religion
- Affiliation: Hinduism
- District: Kollam district
- Deity: Shiva
- Festivals: Srattu, Thiruvathira Aaratu

Location
- Location: Thrikkadavoor
- State: Kerala
- Country: India
- Interactive map of Thrikkadavoor Sree Mahadeva Temple
- Coordinates: 8°55′14″N 76°35′44″E

Architecture
- Type: Kerala

Thrikkadavoor Sree Mahadeva Temple is a Hindu temple in Thrikkadavoor, Kollam district, Kerala, India, dedicated to Shiva. One of the 108 Shiva Temples of Kerala, it is administered by the Travancore Devaswom Board. The temple holds an annual ten-day Srattu festival.

== Legend ==
The temple is one of the 108 Shiva Temples of Kerala, has a golden flagstaff, and is administered by the Travancore Devaswom Board. By temple tradition, the sage Mrikandu and his wife Marudmati, also called Manasvini, worshipped Shiva for a son. Shiva offered a choice between a gifted son who would live only sixteen years and a dull son who would live long; Mrikandu chose the former and was granted Markandeya.

On the day Markandeya was fated to die, he was worshipping a Shivalingam when the messengers of Yama, the god of death, could not take his life. Yama came himself and cast his noose, which fell instead around the lingam. Shiva emerged from it, struck Yama down, and revived him only on the condition that Markandeya would live on. Shiva was thereafter also called Kalantaka. The tradition places these events at Thrikkadavoor and attributes the Maha Mrityunjaya Stotra to Markandeya; the scene of Shiva conquering death is cast in metal and venerated at the temple.

== Deities ==
The principal deity is Shiva. The subsidiary deities are Ayyappan, Ganesha, Brahmarakshasa, Yakshini, Nagaraja and Nagayakshini. Krishna is worshipped at a separate shrine outside the sanctum.

== Festivals ==
The annual Srattu festival falls in the Malayalam month of Kumbham (February–March) and lasts ten days. Its rites include the Thiruvathira Aaratu and offerings of 101 kalasam pots and chathussatham. Eight horse-shaped chariots represent the eight karas, the divisions around the temple. A procession of the nedumkuthira (eduppukuthira), a tall horse-shaped frame carried by men through water, is also held.

== Thrikkadavoor Sivaraju ==
Thrikkadavoor Sivaraju, a male elephant owned by the temple, received the Gajarajarathna title from the Travancore Devaswom Board in 2023.
