= List of elephants in mythology and religion =

The following elephants or elephant-like figures occur in mythology and religion.

== Lists ==
=== Deities with elephant heads ===
- Ganesh, a Hindu deity.
- Malini, a goddess associated with the birth of Ganesha
- Vinayaki, a Hindu goddess.

=== Mythological elephants ===
- Airavata, an elephant ridden by the Hindu god Indra.
- The eight Ashtadiggajass described as supporting the world in Hindu cosmology
- Erawan, the Thai version of Airavata
- Gajasura, an elephant demon from Hindu mythology
- Gajendra, from the Sanskrit text Gajendra Moksha
- Girimekhala, the elephant that carries Mara in Theravada Buddhism
- Kasogonagá, a Toba deity described as either an elephant or an anteater.
- Supratika, a name for several elephants in Hindu mythology
- Behemoth, a demon depicted as a round-bellied elephant

== Other instances ==
An elephant god doubtlessly existed in the predynastic period of Egypt, as indicated from the statuette of a man with the head of an elephant. Jean Vercoutter discovered this in a temple in Sudan, Wad ban Naqa. In 1970, during the German expedition of Musawwarat es-Sufra at Sudan, graffito was found on the eastern outside wall of the Temple of Mut of an elephant-headed figure wearing a sun disk.

== See also ==
- Gaja, elephants in Hindu mythology
- List of fictional elephants
- List of individual elephants
- List of legendary creatures
