= Shanthi (elephant) =

World's most studied asian elephant

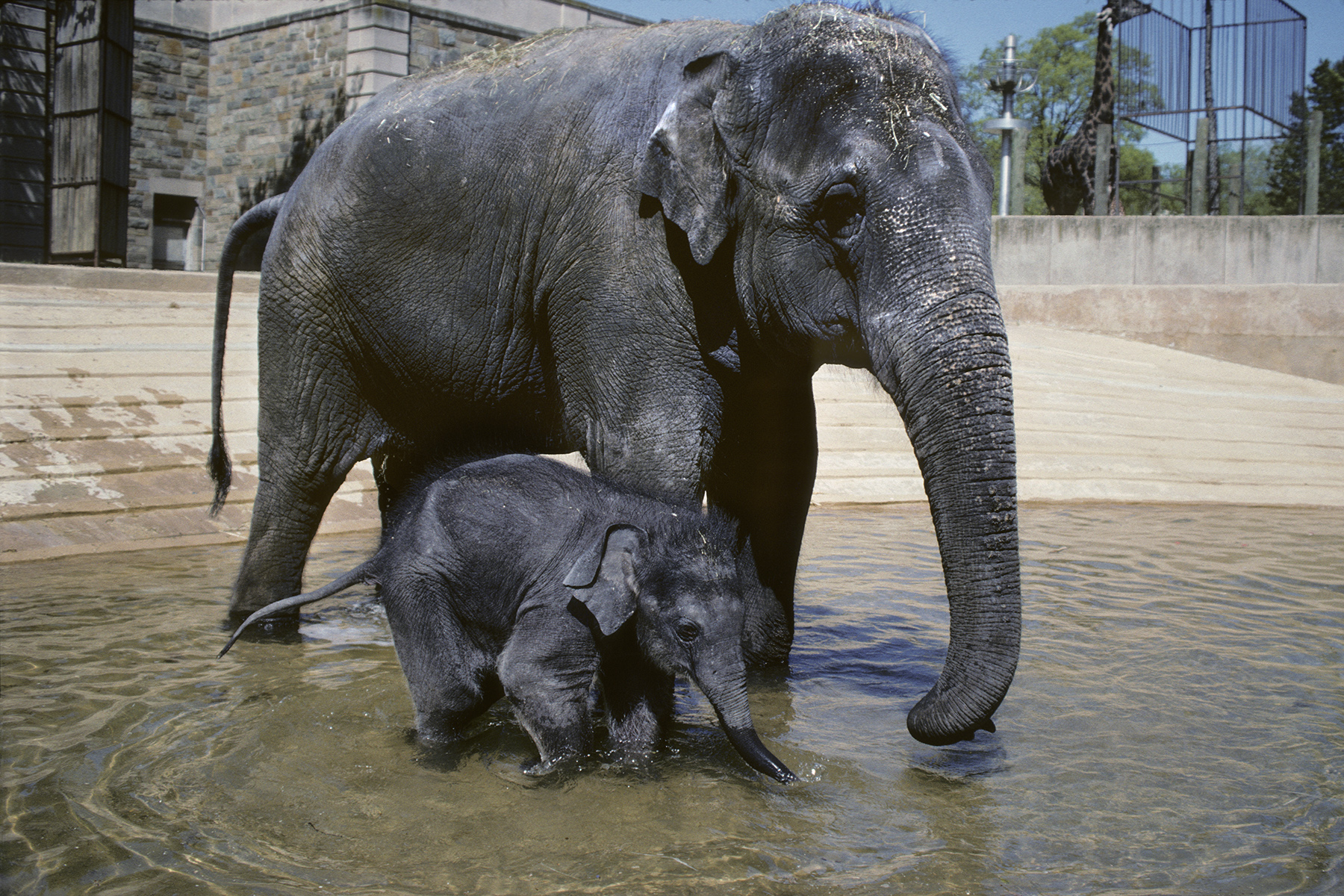
- Shanthi and daughter Kumari, April 1994
- Species: Elephas maximus maximus
- Sex: Female
- Born: 1975; Sri Lanka
- Died: June 26, 2020 (aged 45); Smithsonian National Zoological Park
- Cause of death: Osteoarthritis
- Known for: Most studied Asian elephant ever, elephant gifted to Jimmy Carter by Sri Lanka

Shanthi (1975 – June 26, 2020) was an Asian elephant gifted to the US by Sri Lanka in 1976. She is considered to be the most studied Asian elephant ever.

== Life ==
=== Early years ===
Shanthi was born in Sri Lanka around 1975 and lived at the Pinnawela Elephant Orphanage until 1976.

=== Gift to the US ===
In 1976, Shanthi was flown from Sri Lanka to the United States. The orphaned calf was a state gift from William Gopallawa and the children of Sri Lanka to the children of the United States. At an April 2, 1977 ceremony at the National Zoo in Washington, D.C., she was symbolically handed over by Punitha Gunaratne, the daughter of a Sri Lankan Embassy official, to Amy Carter, the daughter of President Jimmy Carter.

Shanthi was the mother of Kumari, a female who was born in 1993 but died in 1995 of elephant endotheliotropic herpesvirus. She also gave birth in 2001 to Kandula, a male who is currently a resident of the Oklahoma City Zoo.

=== Death ===
Shanthi was euthanized on June 26, 2020 at the National Zoo in Washington, D.C., after decades of increasingly debilitating osteoarthritis.

“After decades of managing and treating Shanthi’s osteoarthritis, animal care staff recently noted that her physical condition had irreversibly declined,” the Smithsonian’s National Zoo and Conservation Biology Institute said in a statement. “They elected to humanely euthanize her June 26. Shanthi was estimated to be around 45 years old.”

The Zoo also reported in a press release that keepers and care staff had used several innovative treatments over the years to help mitigate the impacts of Shanthi’s degenerative condition. She was the first of her kind to receive therapies including injections of a protein serum to slow disease progression.

== See also ==
- List of individual elephants
- Jayathu
- Smithsonian National Zoo
