= Bamboo (elephant) =

Asian elephant (1966–2022)

Bamboo (November 1966 – November 15, 2022) was an Asian elephant who resided at the Woodland Park Zoo in Seattle, Washington prior to being moved to the Oklahoma City Zoo in 2015. She was at the center of controversy for several years. Her reputation as a troubled elephant, allegedly due to past abuse and an inadequate life at the Zoo, caused animal rights activists such as Friends of Woodland Park Zoo Elephants to fight for the release of the Zoo's elephants to a sanctuary. According to the Zoo's website, Bamboo weighed 8,800 pounds and was the most inquisitive of its three elephants. Bamboo was euthanized in 2022.

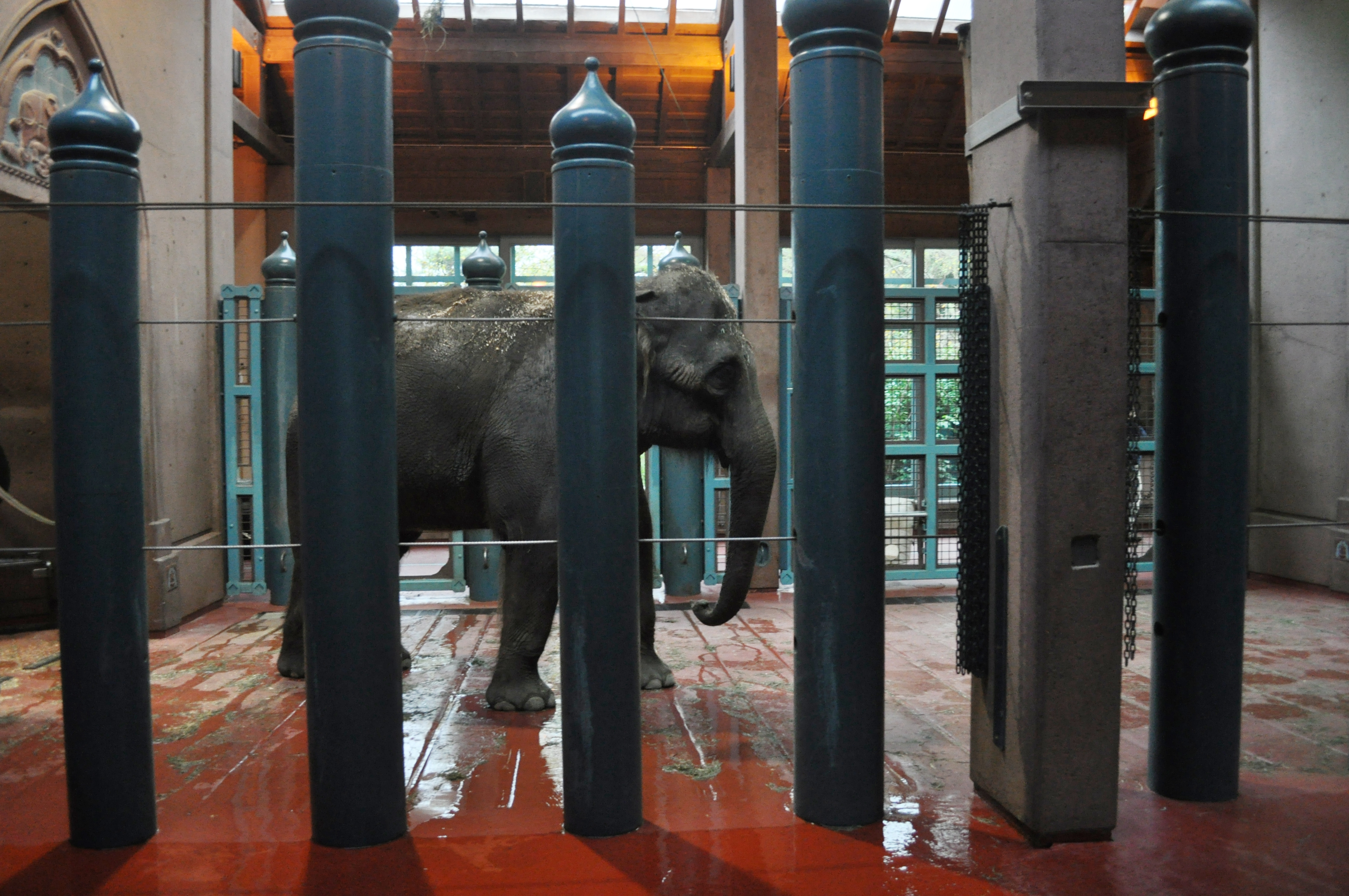
One of the elephants in the Woodland Park Zoo elephant house in 2012, three years before Bamboo's departure to Oklahoma City.

== Early years ==
Bamboo was born in Thailand in November 1966 and was captured from the wild as a very young calf. She was imported into the United States and arrived at the Woodland Park Zoo in Seattle, Washington, on June 1, 1967. She lived at the Children's Zoo in the Family Farm before moving to the old Elephant House. Former Director of the Zoo, David Hancocks, recalled that Bamboo was once a playful, trustworthy, and cooperative elephant who could be walked on Zoo grounds and use the entire park as her playground. According to Hancocks, who left the Zoo in 1984, harsh management methods such as discipline and overnight chaining were reintroduced after his departure. As a result, Bamboo earned a reputation as a dangerous and "difficult" elephant.

== A "difficult" elephant ==
On November 3, 2000, another Asian elephant named Chai gave birth to a female calf named Hansa. The new addition interrupted Bamboo's daily routine, and she was not initially welcoming toward Hansa and had to be housed separately. Spending much of her time alone in a small barn stall, she displayed what is believed to be stereotypical behavior for elephants in captivity - pacing and bobbing her head continuously - caused by inadequate environmental and social conditions and not displayed by elephants living in the wild. A YouTube video taken in May 2001 shows Bamboo exhibiting this behavior, pacing around her small space repeatedly in circles. Bamboo was also known to be aggressive toward keepers; she once grabbed a keeper's bullhook and knocked another keeper down while he was sweeping hay in her stall.

In 2005, it was announced that Bamboo would be moving to the Point Defiance Zoo & Aquarium in Tacoma, Washington in an attempt to integrate her into the "herd" of its two resident Asian elephants, Suki and Hanako, who were similar in age and disposition to Bamboo. According to the Point Defiance Zoo, Bamboo did not show predictable social skills toward newborns or very young calves and therefore was not fit for the Woodland Park Zoo's Asian elephant breeding program. She also had a strained relationship with Seattle's African elephant, Watoto, who had bullied her in the past and had to be housed separately from her. Bamboo arrived at the Point Defiance Zoo on August 25, 2005, but stayed there for less than a year, as Suki and Hanako did not accept her. As a result, she was housed in isolation for the majority of her time in Tacoma. She was returned to the Woodland Park Zoo on June 11, 2006.

== New plans for the Zoo's elephants ==
Due to years of protests by animal rights groups over the zoo's inadequate elephant exhibit, the Woodland Park Zoo launched a task force in 2013 to investigate the living conditions of the elephants. The task force was criticized, however, due to the fact that many of its members were or had been affiliated with the Zoo. Animal rights groups also criticized the task force for its lack of expertise with elephants. In August, the six-member panel suggested changes, such as allowing the elephants to have free contact with one another and replacing the concrete floors of the barn with sand.

In March 2014, the Woodland Park Zoo announced planned changes for the elephant program, which included spending $3 million on improving the exhibit and sending its African elephant to another location in order to house a new Asian elephant. Zoo officials also stated that they may possibly acquire a fourth female Asian elephant of breeding age.

Zoo management reversed course in November 2014, announcing that they would be closing the elephant exhibit rather than expanding it. The Woodland Park Zoo planned to relocate the elephants to other zoos with existing elephant herds; however some groups remained opposed to this and believed the elephants should be placed in nature preserves.

On April 15, 2015, Bamboo and one other elephant were moved from Woodland Park Zoo to Oklahoma City Zoo. They arrived in Oklahoma City Zoo on May 13, 2015, where they were separated and quarantined for 30 days.

== Later life ==
Age 56 at the time of her death, Bamboo was the oldest of the Zoo's elephants as well as the largest, weighing in at 8,800 pounds. She was also the hairiest individual and had a large amount of hair on her head and back. Bamboo was the most inquisitive of the three elephants and had learned how to pick and dismantle locks, open doors, and unscrew bolts.

== Death ==
Oklahoma City Zoo announced on November 15, 2022, that Bamboo had been euthanized due to declining health.

== See also ==
- List of individual elephants
