= Miss Jim =

Elephant

- Sex: Female
- Born: c. 1878
- Died: 1 October 1948 (aged 70); Saint Louis Zoo
- Known for: First elephant at the Saint Louis Zoo
- Weight: 4,000 lb (1800 kg)
- Named after: James Harper

Miss Jim, "The First Lady of the St. Louis Zoo" was the zoo's first elephant, and a star attraction from 1916 to 1948. She was a former circus elephant, bought for the zoo by the children of St. Louis who pooled their pennies for her purchase.

== Early life ==
Miss Jim was estimated to have been born in the late 1870s, and spent years performing in a circus under the name 'Judy'. She ended up in the hands of showman and animal dealer William Preston Hall.

== Arrival at the Saint Louis Zoo ==
In 1916, the Saint Louis Zoo began seeking out an elephant to purchase. They turned to local schoolchildren to help raise funds by holding a penny drive. Some 6,000 children participated, raising $2,384. Every child who participated was given a certificate from the zoo. Miss Jim was actually purchased for $3,000, with the zoo making up the difference.

Miss Jim was moved to the zoo in April 1916. She spent two days in a nearby carriage house before a parade was held for her arrival on April 15. She arrived in St. Louis by train at 9:15 AM. Schoolboys had been chasing after the train as it drew close. After arriving at the station, Miss Jim was escorted through the city to the zoo, a parade consisting of a battalion of mounted police, a band of musicians, and some of the schoolchildren who had helped purchase her following behind. She eventually arrived at the zoo to great fanfare.

Miss Jim was renamed from Judy after James Harper, president of the school board, but was called Miss Jim due to being a female.

== Life at the Saint Louis Zoo ==
After Miss Jim's arrival, an elephant house was built to accommodate her. She was moved into the new building in 1917. Miss Jim spent the majority of her life at the zoo giving daily rides to children. In one month, the zoo logged her as giving over 7,800 rides. In 1942, she retired from giving daily rides due to her old age, but continued giving occasional rides up until shortly before her death.

In 1932, Miss Jim's keeper, Phil Rost, was arrested and suspended from his job at the zoo. For over a week, Miss Jim and the zoo's other elephant at the time, Miss Martha, were not let outside due to fears that the extra keeper would not be able to keep the animals docile. Eventually, Miss Jim was brought outside for exercise again.

== Death ==
In her last months, Miss Jim began suffering from arthritis. On October 1, 1948, she slipped into a coma, and passed away shortly afterwards. She was believed to be the oldest Asian elephant in captivity at the time of her death, estimated to be 70 years old.

== See also ==
- List of individual elephants
