= Dunk (elephant) =

Dunk with a keeper.

Dunk (c. 1861 – March 30, 1917), a tuskless, male Asian elephant (known as a "makhna") possibly from Ceylon (now Sri Lanka), was the first elephant to reside at the National Zoo in Washington, D.C. He was given to the National Zoo on April 30, 1891 by James E. Cooper, owner and manager of the Adam Forepaugh Circus.

When Dunk first arrived at the National Zoo, he had no shelter and was tied to a tree with his companion Gold Dust to prevent him from wandering. Once a day, both elephants were walked to Rock Creek to swim. A temporary structure, known as the Octagonal House, was eventually built for the elephants. Construction on a permanent, brick elephant house, designed by Hornblower & Marshall, began in September 1902 and was completed in January 1903.

== Death and legacy ==
Dunk was ill throughout the winter of 1917. On March 30, 1917, after Dunk broke his shoulder in a fall, keeper William Blackburne euthanized him by shooting. Despite a famous ill-temper, Dunk was popular with the children of Washington, D.C. To commemorate his memory, they raised money for a plaque, which remains in the elephant house at the National Zoo today.

== See also ==
- List of individual elephants
