= Mona (elephant) =

Asian elephant

Mona

Mona (c. 1951 — June 21, 2007) was a 7,800 pound Asian elephant (Elephas maximus) on exhibit at the Birmingham Zoo in Birmingham, Alabama (United States). Mona's age was contested. According to zoo officials, she was born in the wild around 1947. An entry in a stud book maintained by the Association of Zoos and Aquariums gives an approximate birth year of 1951.

She was housed in Miami, Florida for about two years before debuting in Birmingham on July 4, 1955, the year the Zoo reopened at its present location in Lane Park. She was estimated to be 55 or 56 at the time of her death. The average life span of female Asian elephants, in the wild, is currently estimated to be about 60 years. In captivity it is estimated to be 43. Some individuals outside of the United States have lived in excess of 70 years in captivity.

During her tenure at the zoo, Mona inhabited a 1,000-square-foot (100 m^{2}) pen with access to two concrete-floored stalls in the zoo's pachyderm building. The effect of concrete floors on captive elephants has been shown to be detrimental, and Mona's feet were badly damaged by the so-called "Zoo-Genic Elephant Foot Disease". Her outdoor enclosure was dirt-floored, but the surface had been packed hard by her continual pacing.

Enrichment activities enjoyed by Mona included painting and playing music. Her normal routines were highlighted by special treats of marshmallow Peeps, Altoids and peanuts used as rewards in training. She was also given a large watermelon cake and several toys each year on July 7, which was observed as her birthday and celebrated with a party for zoo visitors.

On January 31, 2005, Mona's companion of 48 years, Susie, died at the zoo at age 53. Since then Mona was the zoo's sole elephant. The Elephant Sanctuary offered to relocate and house Mona at their 2,700-acre (11 km^{2}) facility near Hohenwald, Tennessee without charge. The "Alabama Wildlife Advocates" actively lobbied for this move, which was rejected by Zoo officials. The group created an online petition and demonstrated outside the zoo during her annual birthday celebration.

Zoo director Bill Foster argued that the stress caused by travel and resettlement would not be healthy for Mona, and that she should not, at her age, have been subjected to the behavior and pecking order of an unfamiliar herd. He indicated that the zoo planned to improve her habitat and was considering adding a companion to her exhibit.

On June 18, 2007, zoo staff found Mona unable to stand on her own and assisted her with slings. It was surmised that one of her legs had become numb from her lying on it. She was placed on 24-hour watch and appeared to be in good health and spirits in subsequent evaluations. Nevertheless, two days later she indicated that she was unwilling to get to her feet, even with assistance. Zoo veterinarian Marie Rush consulted with other staffers and the decision was made to euthanize. She was pronounced dead at 10:30 AM on June 21, 2007, with a necropsy set to begin the same afternoon.

== See also ==
- List of individual elephants
