= Motola =

Asian elephant injured by a landmine

Motola (born ca 1961) is a female Asian elephant in Thailand who stepped on a landmine in 1999 while working at a logging camp near the Burmese border. At the time of the accident, she was 38 years old. The mine mangled her left front foot and leg, and her foot was amputated shortly after. The accident highlighted the dangers of mines that remain from various insurgencies.

Motola walked on three legs for a number of years until she was fitted with a prosthetic foot. She received medical care at the Friends of the Asian Elephant Foundation hospital. According to the Asian Elephant Foundation, Motola is the second elephant to wear a prosthetic leg.

In 2019, on the 20th anniversary of Motola's accident, Motala was honored in a 'hong kwan' ceremony to honor her recovery and bring good fortune.

== See also ==
- List of individual elephants
