= Tuffi =

Elephant famous for falling from monorail

Coordinates: 51°16′5.13″N 7°11′33.13″E

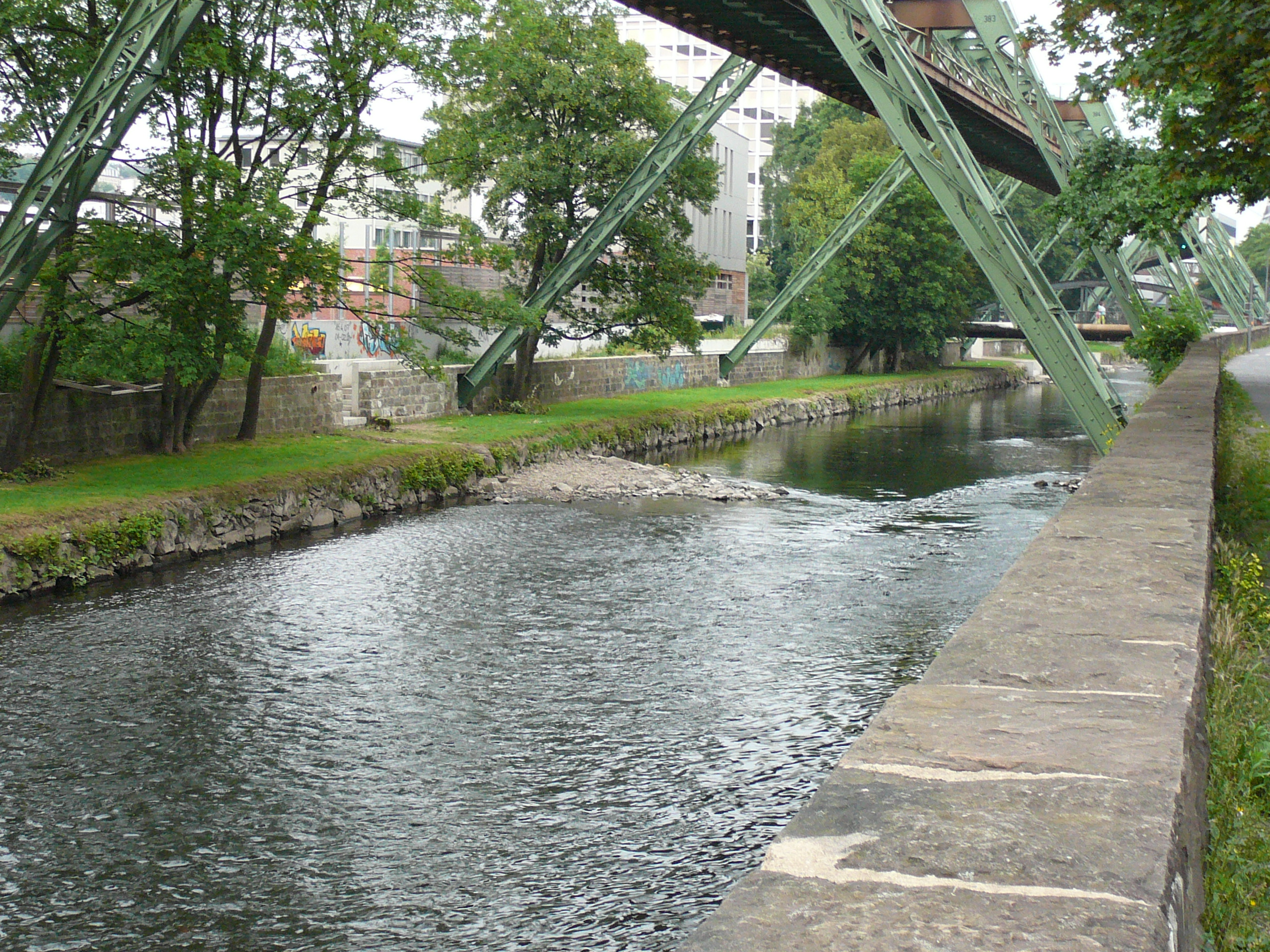
The Wupper river, between Schwebebahn stations Alter Markt and Adlerbrücke

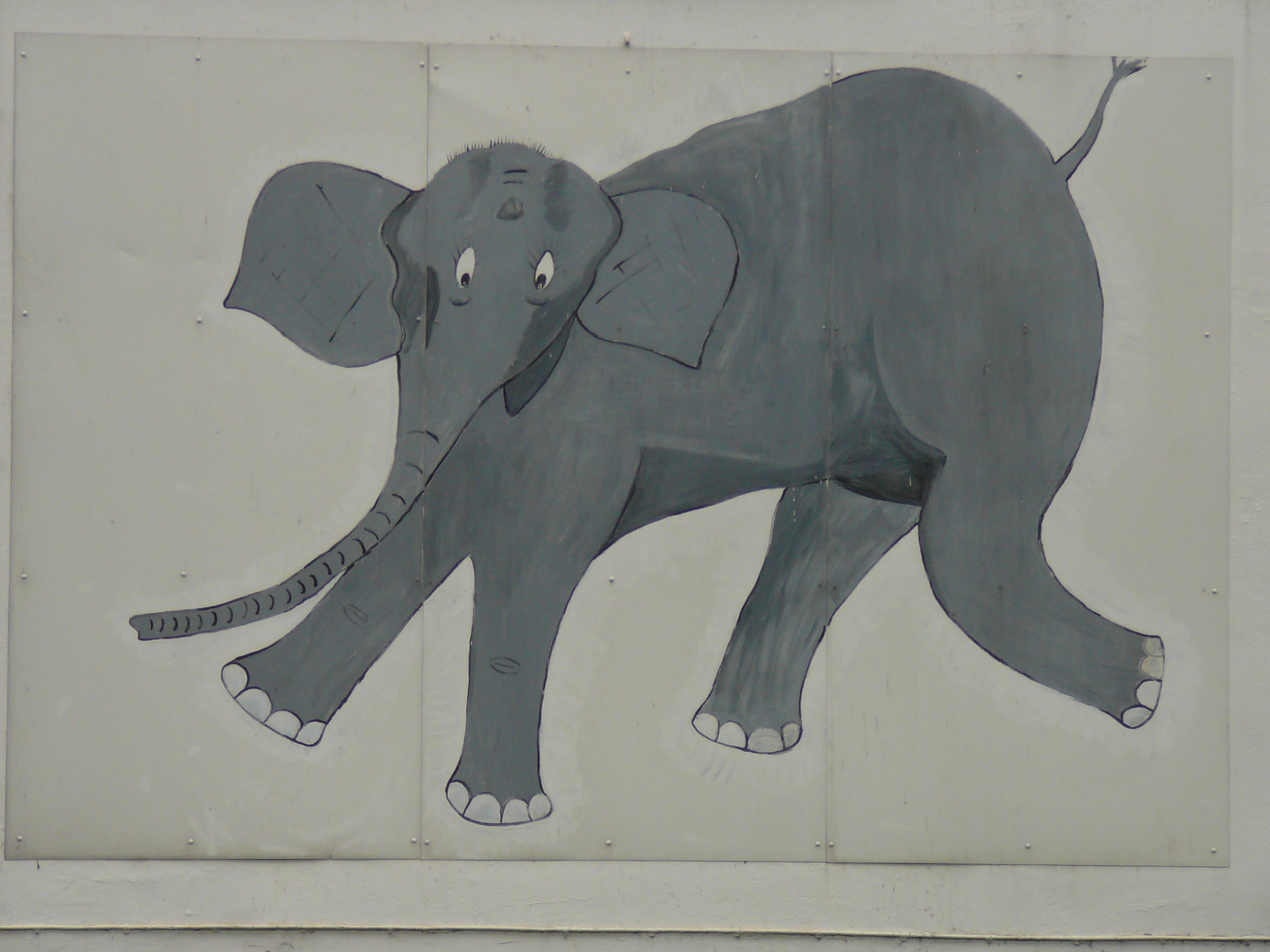
Painting of Tuffi on a house wall in Wuppertal facing the Schwebebahn

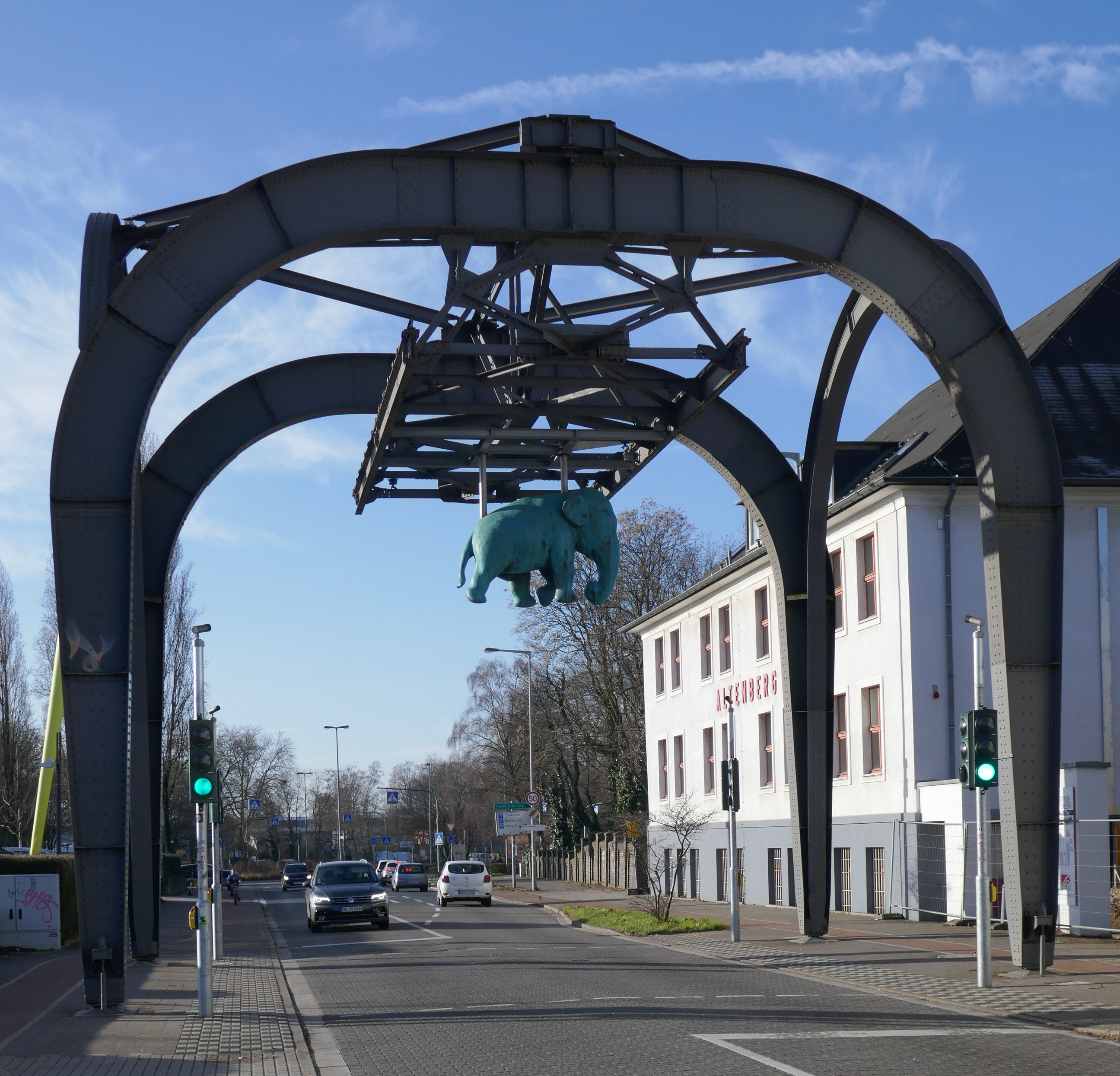
Bronze sculpture of Tuffi by Jörg Mazur

Tuffi (born 1946, India – died in 1989, Paris, France) was a female Asian elephant that became famous in West Germany during 1950 when she accidentally fell from the Wuppertal Schwebebahn into the River Wupper underneath.

On 21 July 1950, the circus director Franz Althoff had Tuffi, then four years old, transported on the suspended monorail in Wuppertal, as a publicity stunt. The elephant trumpeted wildly and ran through the carriage, broke through a window and fell 12 metres (39 ft) into the River Wupper, suffering only minor injuries. A panic broke out in the carriage and some passengers were injured. Althoff helped the elephant out of the water. Both the circus director and the official who had allowed the ride were fined. Tuffi was sold to Cirque Alexis Gruss in 1968; she died there in 1989.

No photograph of the incident is known; a widely circulated postcard picture is a montage. A building near the location of the incident, between the stations Alter Markt and Adlerbrücke, features a painting of Tuffi. A local milk-factory has chosen the name as a brand.

The Wuppertal tourist information keeps an assortment of Tuffi-related souvenirs, local websites show original pictures.

In 1970 Marguerita Eckel and Ernst-Andreas Ziegler published a children's picture book about the incident titled Tuffi und die Schwebebahn (“Tuffi and the suspension railway”).

== See also ==
- List of individual elephants
