= Lallah Rookh =

Circus elephant

Lallah Rookh (died 11 September 1860) was a female Asian elephant in Dan Rice's circus. She was known for her tightrope walking act.

Lallah started her circus career in Franconi's Hippodrome under the name of Jenny Lind, from which she kept from 1848 to 1851. In 1851, she was renamed as Juliet and was paired with another elephant, Romeo. She worked with animal trainer Charles Noyes who, in 1853, left Franconi's with Lallah and a white camel to join with Rice's circus in Columbus, Ohio. Rice renamed her Lallah Rookh after the popular poem by Thomas Moore and she began performing in the show two days after they arrived.

Lallah was the first elephant in the United States to perform a head stand consistently. Her most famous feat was her tightrope walking act. Lallah walked on a specially made rope, six inches in diameter and twenty feet long, which hung four feet off of the ground between two pairs of crossed beams. Midway through her walk, Lallah would stop and raise her foreleg, and Dan Rice would give her an American flag to hold in her trunk as she continued the rest of the way.

In August 1860, Rice had Lallah Rookh swim across the Ohio River in Cincinnati, Ohio to drum up publicity for his new "Monster Show." It took her 45 minutes to swim across the river. A month later, Lallah died of a fever brought about by her swim.

== See also ==
- List of individual elephants
