= Timothy (tortoise) =

Deceased Mediterranean spur-thighed tortoise

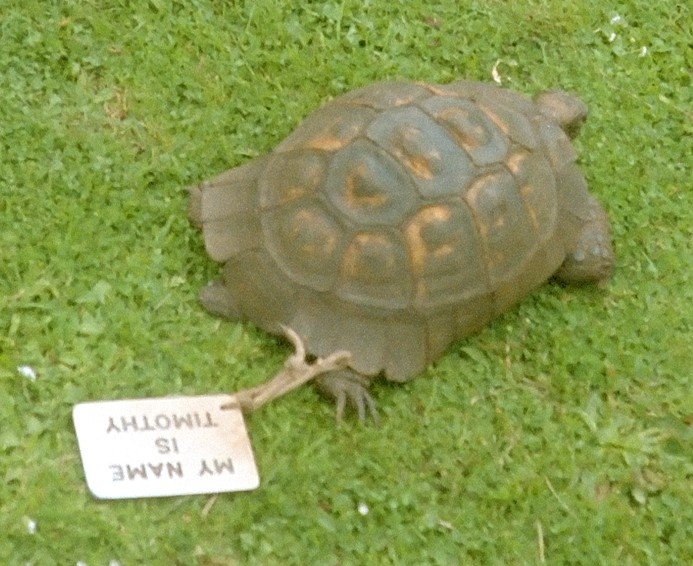
- Timothy in 1993: The tag attached to her says, "My name is Timothy. I am very old – please do not pick me up".
- Species: Spur-thighed tortoise (Testudo graeca)
- Sex: Female
- Hatched: c. 1844; Ottoman Empire
- Died: 3 April 2004 (aged 160); Powderham Castle, Devon, England

Timothy (c. 1844 – 3 April 2004) was a 5 kg (11 lb) Mediterranean spur-thighed tortoise, estimated to be about 160 years old at the time of her death. This made her the oldest known animal resident in mainland U.K. In spite of her name, Timothy was female; sex identification for tortoises was not properly known in the 19th century. Timothy was named after a tortoise owned by Gilbert White.

Timothy was believed to have been hatched in the Mediterranean shores of the Ottoman Empire (modern-day Turkey) and was found aboard a Portuguese privateer in 1854, aged around 10, by Captain John Guy Courtenay-Everard of the Royal Navy. The tortoise served as a mascot on a series of navy vessels until 1892. She was the ship mascot of HMS Queen during the first bombardment of Sevastopol in the Crimean War (she was the last survivor of this war), then moved to HMS Princess Charlotte followed by HMS Nankin.

After her naval service, she retired to live out her life on dry land, taken in by the Earl of Devon at his home, Powderham Castle. From 1935, she lived in the castle's rose garden and was owned by Camilla Gabrielle Courtenay (1913–2010), the daughter of the 16th Earl of Devon. On her underside was etched "Where have I fallen? What have I done?", English translation of the Courtenay family motto ubi lapsus, quid feci.

In 1926, Timothy's owners decided that "he" should mate, and then "he" was discovered to be actually female. Despite this information, mating attempts were unsuccessful.

Timothy is buried at Powderham Castle.

== See also ==
- Jonathan (tortoise) – Oldest known living land animal (hatched c. 1832)
- Lin Wang – Individual Asian elephant
