= Thrikkadavoor Sivaraju =

One of the tallest living elephants in Asia

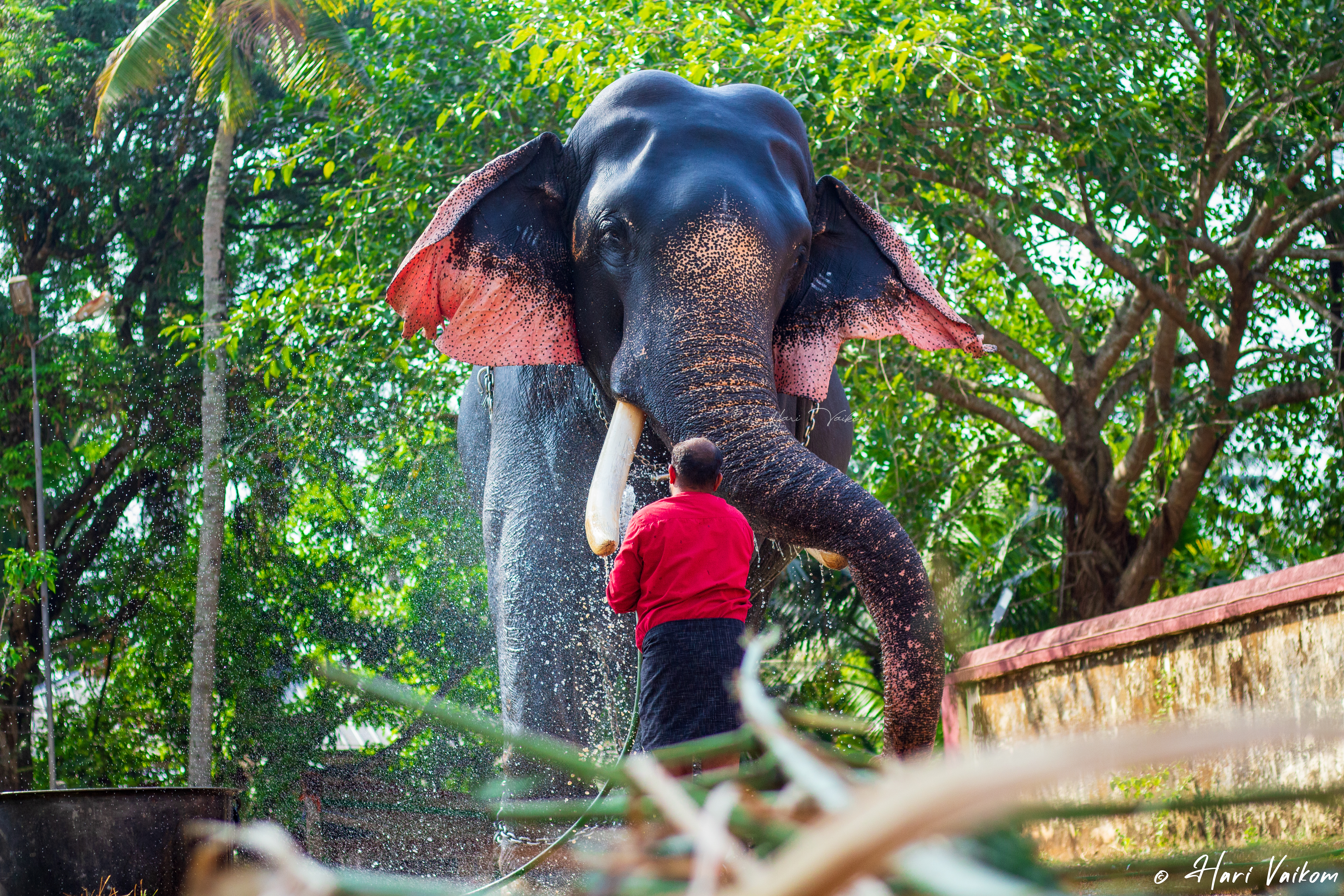
- Species: Elephas maximus (Asian Elephant)
- Sex: Male
- Born: c. 1973; Konni forest, Kerala
- Nationality: India
- Known for: Poorams
- Owner: Travancore Devaswom Board
- Height: 3.11 m (10 ft 2 in)
- Named after: Shiva (mahadev)

Thrikkadavoor Sivaraju (c. 1973) is an elephant from southern Kerala owned by Travancore Devaswom. At a height of 311-312 cm, Sivaraju is one of the tallest living elephants in Asia.

Sivaraju is an elephant with the body structure that is mentioned in mathangaleela(Book of elephants ). He is having a massive ear structure that makes sivaraju different and beautiful from other elephants. In May 2024, Sivaraju received an amount of Rs 8,000,08 for Kattakampal Pooram from Srayil Desham Thrissur 2024. This record was previously held by Gajarajan Guruvayur Padmanabhan, who received the highest donation fee in 2004.

== See also ==
- List of individual elephants
