= Lin Wang =

Individual Asian elephant

- 林旺
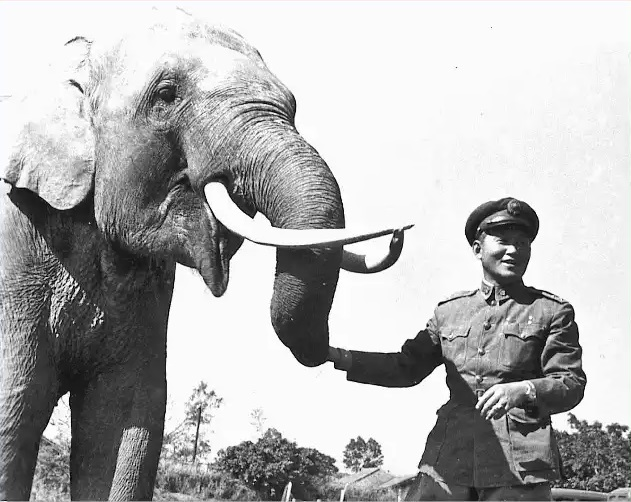
- Lin Wang (left) and General Sun Li-jen (right), 1947
- Born: January 18, 1917; British Burma
- Died: February 26, 2003 (aged 86); Taipei Zoo, Taipei, Taiwan
- Military career
- Allegiance: Republic of China
- Branch: National Revolutionary Army Ground Forces
- Service years: 1943–52
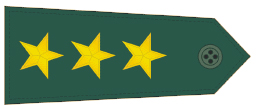
- Rank: General
- Unit: Chinese Expeditionary Force
- Conflicts: Second Sino-Japanese War; World War II: Burma Campaign

Lin Wang (Chinese: 林旺; pinyin: Lín Wàng; Zhuyin Fuhao: ㄌ一ㄣˊ ㄨㄤˋ; 1917 – 26 February 2003) was an Asian elephant that served with the Chinese Expeditionary Force during the Second Sino-Japanese War (1937–1945) and later relocated to Taiwan with the Kuomintang forces. Lin Wang lived out most of his life in the Taipei Zoo and was the most famous animal of the zoo. Many adults and children alike affectionately called the bull elephant "Grandpa Lin Wang."

== History ==
=== Sino-Japanese War ===
After Japan attacked Pearl Harbor in 1941, the Sino-Japanese War, which began in 1937, became a part of the greater conflict of World War II. When the Japanese proceeded to attack British colonies in Burma, Generalissimo Chiang Kai-shek formed the Chinese Expeditionary Force under the leadership of General Sun Li-jen, to fight in the Burma Campaign. After a battle at a Japanese camp in 1943, Lin Wang, along with twelve other elephants, were captured by the Chinese. These elephants were used by the Japanese army to transport supplies and pull artillery pieces. The Allied forces also used these elephants to do similar tasks. At this time, Lin Wang was named "Ah Mei" (阿美), meaning "The Beautiful".

In 1945, the Expeditionary Force was recalled to China. The elephants and their handlers marched along the Burma Road, and six elephants died during the difficult trek. By the time they arrived in Guangdong, the war had ended. However, the elephants' service with the army was not over. They participated in building some monuments for the martyrs of the war, and in the spring of 1946, they also performed for a circus to raise money for famine relief in Hunan province.

Later, four elephants in the group were sent to the zoos of Beijing, Shanghai, Nanjing, and Changsha. The remaining three elephants, including Lin Wang, were relocated to a park in Guangzhou.

=== In Taiwan ===
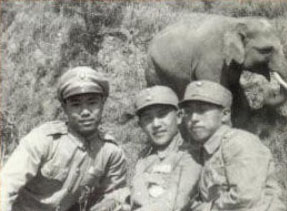
Lin Wang and his army comrades in Kaohsiung, Taiwan

In 1947, Sun Li-jen was sent to Taiwan to train new troops. He took the three elephants with him, though one sick elephant died during the trip across the strait. The two remaining elephants were used to transport logs and accomplish other simple tasks near the army base in Fongshan, Kaohsiung. In 1951 the other elephant died and Lin Wang became the only one left of the original thirteen elephants from the Burmese days.

In 1954, the army decided to give Lin Wang to Taipei Zoo at Yuanshan (圓山), where he met his lifelong mate Malan (馬蘭). At this time, Lin Wang was still named "Ah Mei" and the keeper of the zoo felt that the name was too feminine. Thus, his name was changed to "King of the Forest" (森林之王), abbreviated "Lín Wáng" (林王). However, a reporter misheard the name and published his name as Lín Wàng (林旺, different character and different intonation), and this name stuck forever.

Lin Wang became the most famous and popular animal in Taiwan, and in 1983 the zoo threw the first birthday party for his sixty-sixth birthday. Since then, his birthday was celebrated every year on the last Sunday of October at the zoo, attracting thousands of visitors, including visitations from Taipei mayors. In 1986, the zoo relocated from Yuanshan to Mucha and many Taipei citizens crowded along the streets to see the animals, particularly Lin Wang, move house.

In early 2003 Lin Wang suffered arthritis on his left hind leg. He started to lose appetite along with other complications. His condition deteriorated and he died on 26 February.

His memorial service, which lasted several weeks, was visited by tens of thousands of people, many of whom left cards and flowers for the elephant. Lin Wang was posthumously made an Honorary Taipei Citizen by Taipei mayor Ma Ying-jeou. President Chen Shui-bian sent a wreath, with a card addressing "to our forever friend, Lin Wang."

== Legacy ==
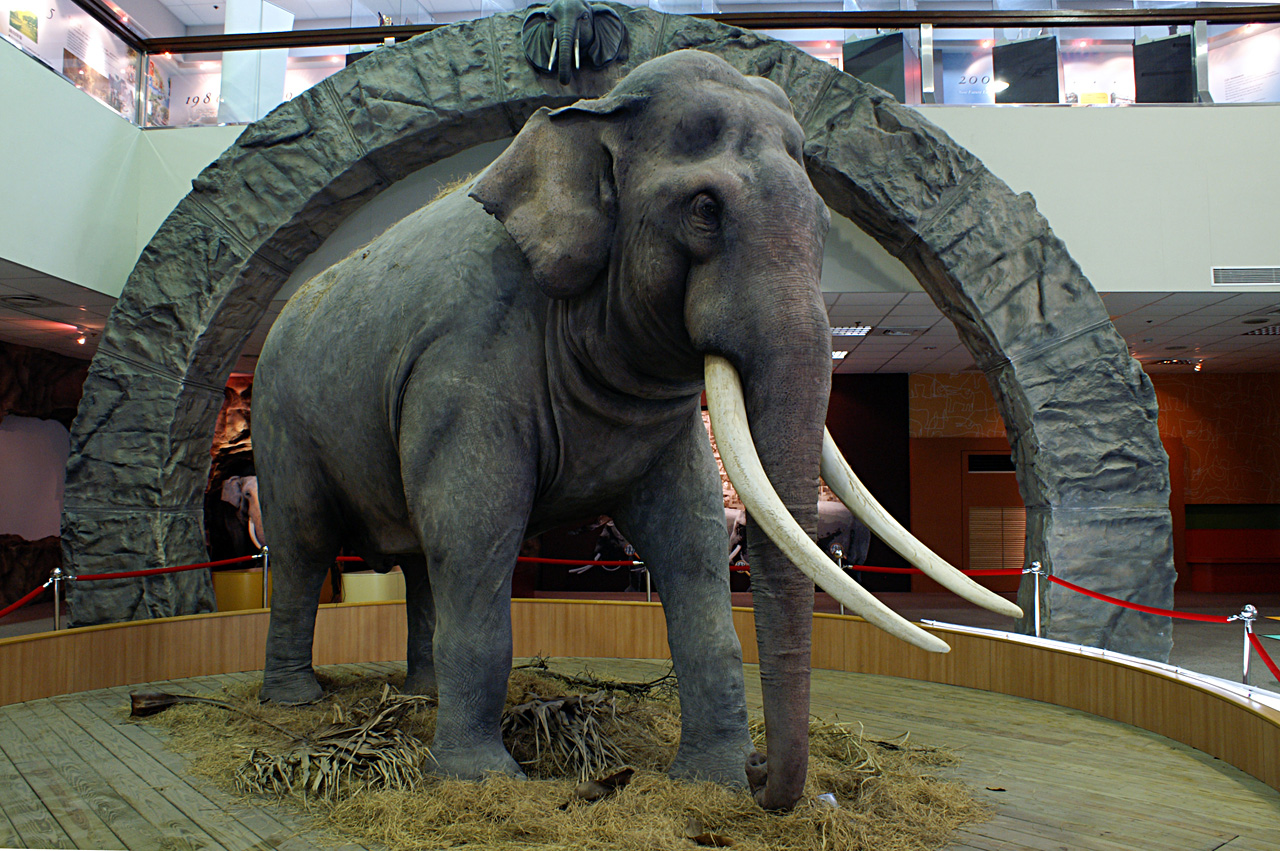
Specimen of Lin Wang, in Taipei Zoo

Compared to the average life expectancy of 70 for a typical Asian elephant, Lin Wang lived much longer, dying in his eighty-sixth year. He is the longest-living elephant in captivity, surpassing Lakshmikutty from India who reached the age of 84 before she died in 1997.

In addition to his service to the army, Lin Wang also became a cultural icon and an inseparable part in the memories of many. His life mirrored important events in history, such as the wars in China and later the economic miracle of Taiwan, and three generations of people remember him fondly as a part of national identity. In 2004 Lin Wang was immortalised in a life-size specimen in Taipei Zoo credited to taxidermist, Lin-Wen Lung (林文龍).

== See also ==
- Chengalloor Dakshayani
- War elephant
- Timothy (tortoise)
- List of individual elephants
