= Old Hannibal =

19th century elephant

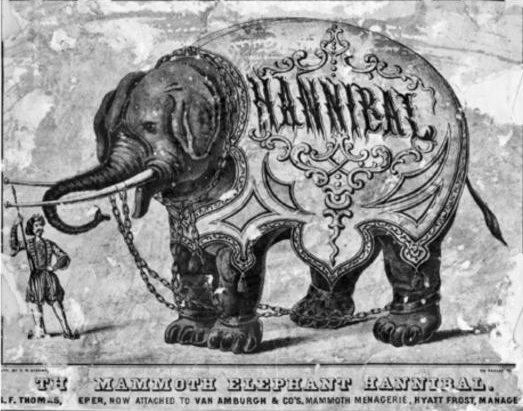
- Drawing of Hannibal circa 1840s.
- Species: Asiatic
- Sex: Male
- Born: c. 1800
- Died: May 7, 1865; Bedford County, Pennsylvania
- Occupation: Circus
- Employer: Isaac A. Van Amburgh
- Years active: c. 1824 - 1865
- Weight: 15,000 lb
- Height: 8 ft (2.4 m)

Old Hannibal (c. 1800 – May 7, 1865) was a famous 19th century Asiatic elephant that was part of Isaac A. Van Amburgh's traveling menagerie.

== History ==
Hannibal was brought to the United States as early as 1824 according to early sources, but at least by 1831. He was first called "Timour the Tartar" and renamed by Raymond, Weeks & Co. in 1833 as "War Elephant Hannibal".

He was known for having "fits of fury", and reportedly killed several people. Around 1839, he engaged in a fight with Columbus, another huge elephant, in Algiers, New Orleans; Columbus also killed two men that day. In June 1854, he escaped his keeper near Pawtucket, Rhode Island and ran many miles before being captured. And in November 1859, he caused a scene when he briefly escaped from captivity in Williamsburg, Brooklyn, injuring one man and freeing other animals from their cages on his way. In October 1862, he killed a "partially deranged" man who irritated him in Caldwell, Ohio, whereupon Van Amburgh had his tusks sawn off.

One winter, Hannibal was wintered next to "Queen Anne", a female elephant from a different traveling circus unit, and it was said to be "a case of love at first sight," with mutual affection displayed between the elephants all winter. Hannibal became very depressed when they were parted in the spring, refusing to eat for eleven days (drinking only water and whiskey), and on the next day briefly escaping his fastenings in a rage.

== Death ==
Hannibal died, perhaps from eating poison laurel, in Centerville, Bedford County, Pennsylvania (located in Cumberland Valley Township), on May 7, 1865. He had lost his appetite and had become weak in the days prior to his death. Originally his skeleton was offered to New York City to be displayed, which was declined. Hannibal was buried near where he died, but his bones were reportedly exhumed under the direction of H.V. Boyd to be sent to the Chicago Medical College in 1871, though it is unclear if the bones made it there.

According to a report on Hannibal's death in the Bedford Inquirer (May 17, 1865):

Hannibal was the largest animal ever exhibited on this continent. His height was eleven feet eight inches, and weight was ascertained to be 15,000 pounds, or seven and one-half tons. He consumed three hundred pounds of hay, three bushels of oats, and forty-six gallons of water per day. He was supposed to be in his sixty-fifth year at the time of his death. For thirty-six years he traversed this continent, at an average of 3,000 miles per year, the greatest curiosity ever exhibited to the wondering millions.

== See also ==
- List of individual elephants
