= Kongad Kuttisankaran =

Famous elephant which lived in Kerala

- Species: Elephas maximus (Asian Elephant)
- Sex: Male
- Born: c. 1962; Nilambur, Kerala
- Died: 26 July 2020 (aged 57–58)
- Nationality: India
- Known for: Thrissur Pooram, Poorams
- Owner: Kongad Thirumandamkunnu temple
- Height: 3.09 m (10 ft 2 in)
- Named after: chinnakuttan nair ( kuttishankaran nair)

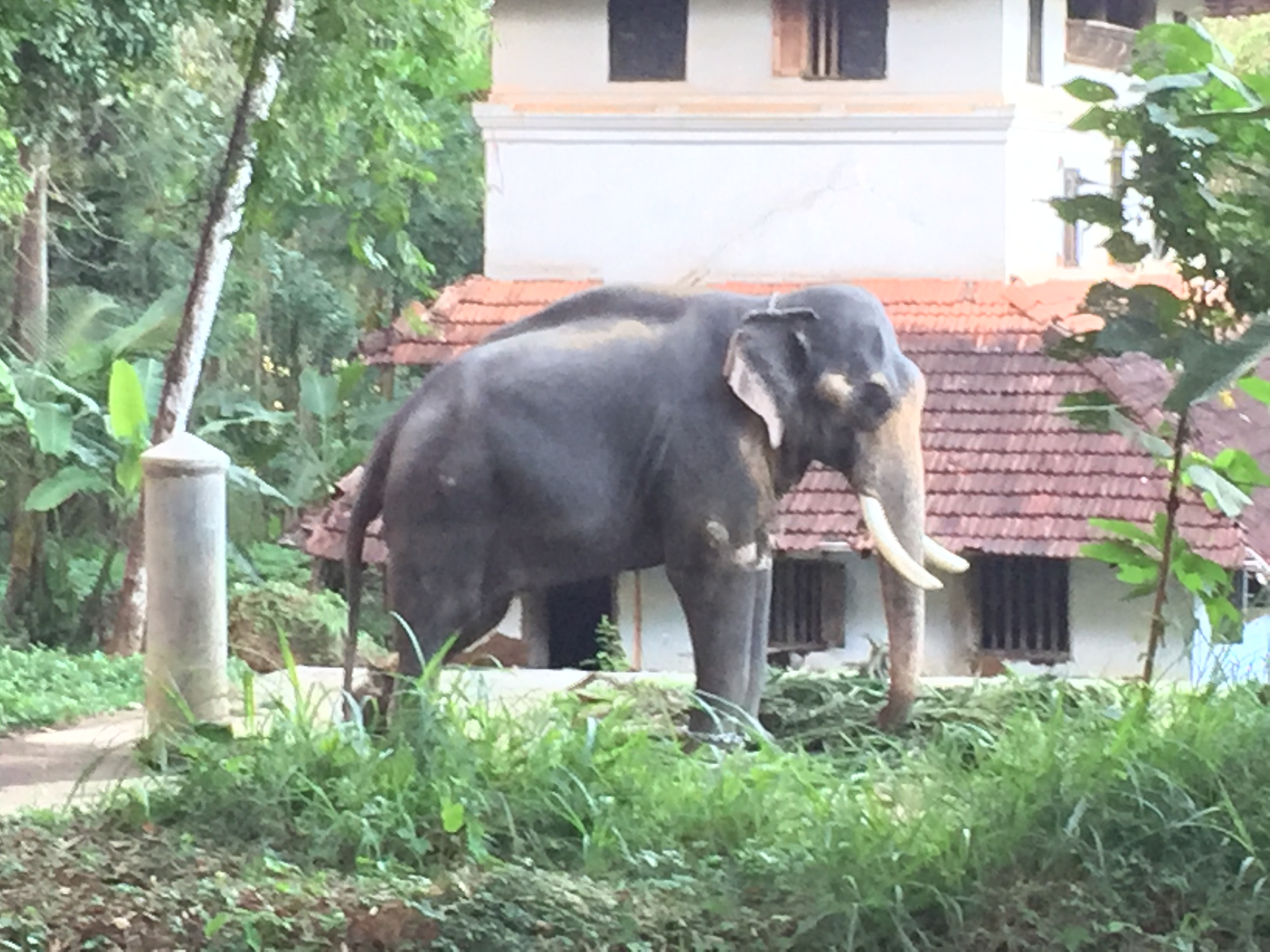
Kuttisankaran in his compound in Kongad in December 2017

Gajarajan Kongad Kuttisankaran (c. 1962 — 26 July 2020) was an elephant that lived in Kongad, Palakkad, Kerala. He is one among the few native elephants born in Kerala to have a height of more than 309 cm.

Kuttisankaran was born at the Nilambur Forest. After leaving the forest at a very young age, he was offered to the Kongad Thirumandhamkunnu temple in 1969. He has won the titles of Adyan Thampuran, Ibhakula Chakravarti and Gajarajan. Kuttisankaran was one of the most famous elephants in the folklore of Kerala. According to experts from Madangasastram, he was characterized by 18 claws, a protruding trunk, a long tail and beautiful eyes.

Kuttisankaran was a regular at festivals including Thrissur Pooram, Nemmara Vela, Puthussery Vedi and Mannarkkad Pooram. Kuttisankaran last participated in the Mannarkkad Pooram after which he went to treatment for age related problems and months later, he died on 26 July 2020.

== See also ==
- List of individual elephants
