= Tikiri (elephant) =

Long-lived Sri Lankan elephant

- Other name: Tikiiri
- Species: Sri Lankan elephant
- Sex: Female
- Born: 1949
- Died: 24 September 2019 (aged about 70); Kegalle District
- Years active: ? – 2019

Tikiri (Sinhala: ටිකිරි) (1949 – 24 September 2019), also known as Tikiiri, was a female Sri Lankan elephant and one of the oldest Asian elephants belonging to Sri Lanka. She was one of the elephants used for the Kandy Esala Perahera and was often forced to march at the Perahera which is annually. She was believed to be the second oldest Asian elephant from Sri Lanka after Heiyantuduwa Raja. Tikiri died on 24 September 2019 aged 70 in Kegalle from illness.

During her lifetime, she was used for mainly tourists trekking and for the religious festivals. Earlier in 2019, the images of the weakened elephant posted by Save the Elephant founder Lek Chailert which featured the skeletal-looking pachyderm went viral on social media. The authorities faced criticism and backlash over the lack of compliance regarding the Tikiri's care and accused the authorities of torturing the old elephant by forcing it to march at annual Perehera festivals.

== See also ==
- List of individual elephants
