= Queenie (Melbourne elephant) =

Elephant of the Melbourne Zoo

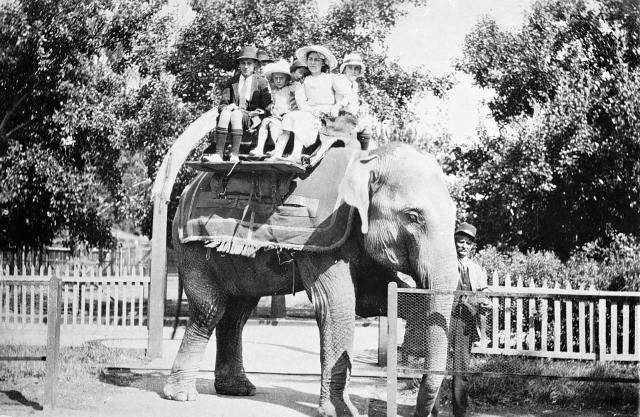
Children on Queenie the elephant at Melbourne Zoo, 1917

Queenie was a female Indian elephant who was used to give rides for children at Melbourne Zoo for 40 years.

Born in the wild, in India around 1900, or perhaps as early as 1895, she arrived at Melbourne Zoo in March 1902—her acquisition funded by Frederick Sheppard Grimwade—and started carrying joy-riders in 1905. Queenie carried 64,447 people, during the year 1929. By 1937, she had carried an estimated 1.5 million passengers and had walked over 19,000 miles. In the year 1936, she earned the zoo £718/7/4, at a time when the basic wage was only £3/12/- per week. Although carrying people every day was not physically taxing, for an elephant, 40 years of doing so was relentlessly monotonous, for such an intelligent animal.

Queenie was a very popular exhibit, with large crowds of children often gathering around her enclosure even when she was not giving rides. She was often teased by children and her keeper, Andrew Wilkie, said she would retaliate by using her trunk to "tumble such trespassers over in the dust".

"On one occasion, a group of about fifteen schoolboys were teasing Queenie by offering her nuts and fruit in turn and then withdrawing the food just as she reached for it. This game continued for a while until the elephant retreated to the pool behind her house. She returned some minutes later and, imitating their behaviour, held out her trunk to each boy in turn, withdrawing it before they would touch it. The boys were delighted with this variation of the game until, as if carrying out a pre-planned attack, she soaked them all thoroughly with a well-aimed spray of dirty water from her pool."

She was euthanized, in July 1945, ten months after she had crushed keeper Wilfred Lawson to death in September 1944.

Lawson had come out of retirement and returned to the zoo, due to a wartime labour shortage. He was said to be rough with Queenie, hitting her behind her ear, with a piece of wood, if she did not move quickly enough. Queenie had reacted to Lawson's return, and was said to have become more difficult to manage; on one occasion, she was said to have pushed Lawson against a wall and that he needed to call for assistance. An eyewitness to Lawson's death said that Queenie had seemed reluctant to return to her enclosure, after her day's work, and Lawson tapped her on the trunk with a stick. The witness said that, in response, Queenie swung her trunk and knocked Lawson down. She then picked up Lawson and crushed him against her mouth, then dropped him to the ground and knelt over him, before another attendant arrived and waved her away. Nonetheless, after her keeper's death she fretted in his absence, suggesting that the attack, while deliberate, was not intended to be fatal.

Although withdrawn from service providing rides and found to be dangerous by a coronial inquiry, she initially remained at the zoo, as an exhibit; it was a fodder shortage and the high cost of keeping her fed that led to her death.

In 1962, elephant rides at Melbourne Zoo finally ceased.

== See also ==
- List of individual elephants

== Sources ==
- O'Brien, Mary (August 9, 2006). "Queenie's last ride". The Age.
- Queenie: One Elephant's Story, by Corinne Fenton and illustrated by Peter Gouldthorpe (Black Dog Books) - a children's story.
- Melbourne Zoo - Queenie
