= Gold Dust (elephant) =

Asian elephant

Gold Dust (c. 1873 – November 4, 1898) was a male Asian elephant that resided at the National Zoo in Washington, D.C. from April 30, 1891, until his death. He was indefinitely lent to the National Zoo as a companion for Dunk by the Adam Forepaugh Circus. He is also alleged to have disemboweled a man in Worcester, Massachusetts in 1884.

On November 3, 1898, Gold Dust collapsed while walking to Rock Creek with his companion Dunk. Even with Dunk's assistance, he was unable to rise and died the following morning. A postmortem examination revealed that his intestines were inflamed and his teeth were in bad shape and could not close properly.

== See also ==
- List of individual elephants
