= Pampadi Rajan =

One of the tallest elephant in Kerala

Pampady Rajan
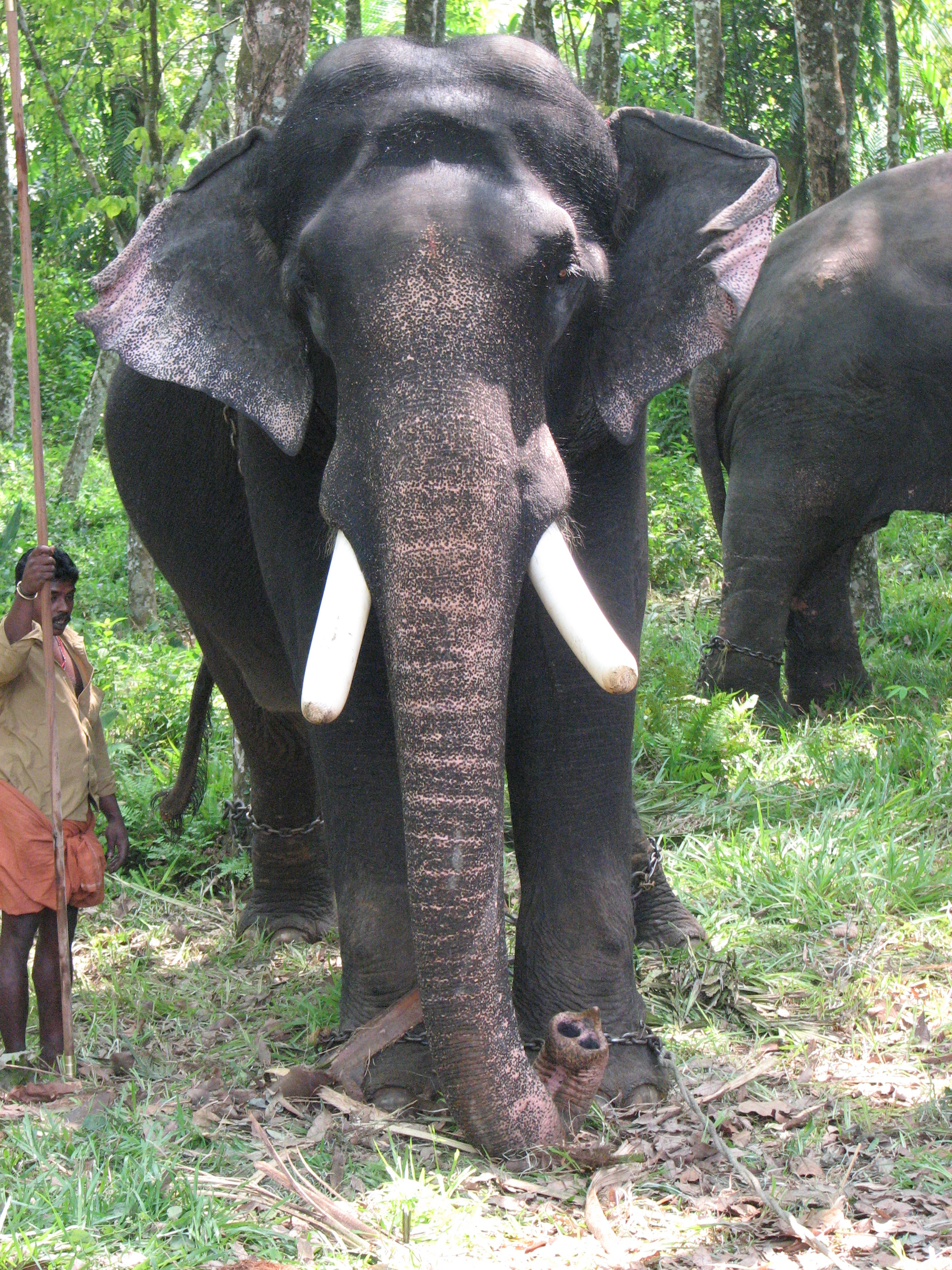
- Pampady Rajan
- Species: Elephas maximus (Asian Elephant)
- Sex: Male
- Born: c. 1977; Kodanadu Forest Range Kerala
- Nationality: Indian
- Known for: Thrissur pooram
- Owner: M.A. Thomas
- Height: 3.08 m (10 ft 1 1/2 in)

Gajarajan Pampady Rajan (c. 1977) also written as Pampady Rajan, is a notable Asian elephant.

Pampady Rajan, born in Malayattoor, was bought in the 1970s at an auction from Kodanad elephant training center for Rs 25,000. His early name at the Kodanad Elephant Training Center was Bastin. Presently living at Pampady, Kottayam, Kerala,

Pampady Rajan has won many Gajapattams (elephant awards) including Gajarajan, Gajakesari, Gajarakthnam, Gajarajaprajapathi, Gajarajakulapathi, Gajaraja Lakshana Perumaal, GajarajaGajothama Thilakam, GajendraKarnan, and a rare award known as the Gajamaanikyam for his beauty.

On 21 October 2015, Rajan was honoured with a new title "Saarvabhauman Gajaraja Gandarvan" by Mahanavami committee in Kodunthirapully Village, Palakkad. He is the winner of 2006 and 2007 Ithithanam Elephant Fest which was held at Changanassery in Kottayam district. He has participated in many poorams including the most famous Thrissur pooram.

Pampady Rajan is a celebrity elephant in Kerala. As elephants are chosen to carry images of deities at temple festivals based on their stature and bearing, he was one of four elephants featured in life-size advertisements on the highway for a temple in Maradu.

In 2012, he was measured to be 308 cm (121 in).

== See also ==
- List of individual elephants
