= Lansing elephant incident =

Event

In late September, 1963, a 12-year-old, 3,000-pound female dancing Asian elephant named Rajje (alternately reported as Raji, Little Rajjee, among other variations) rebelled against her trainer during a performance in a shopping center circus, and escaped into the streets of Lansing, Michigan, aggravated by the frenzied pursuit of nearly 4,000 local residents.

The incident ended with the shooting of the elephant by local police. Provoked by the growing crowd, her rampage took her through the menswear, sporting goods and gift departments of a local Arlan's discount store, before leading police on a two-mile chase in which Rajje knocked down and injured a 67-year-old man, tried to move a car, and caused thousands of dollars in damage before being subdued. Life Magazine quoted Rajje's trainer William Pratt at the scene as shouting, "Damn these people [...] They wouldn't leave her alone."

The incident was widely reported, including a photospread in Life magazine. While the Lansing State Journal coverage stresses the danger of the incident during the "Big Beast" rampage, the Detroit Free Press notes witnesses cried out "Murderers! Murderers!" as police fired eight shots.

Author Nelson Algren cites the injustice and sad end of the pursuit of "Raji, the Pixie-Eared Elephant" in continuity with the ambush of Bonnie Parker and Clyde Barrow in his introduction to a 1968 biography of the outlaws. Then teenage Lansing residents who had goaded the elephant on recalled the incident with sober regret in a local newspaper retrospective in 2011.

== See also ==
- List of individual elephants
- Elephant execution in the United States
