= Kasogonagá =

Toba weather goddess

- Owner of the Storms
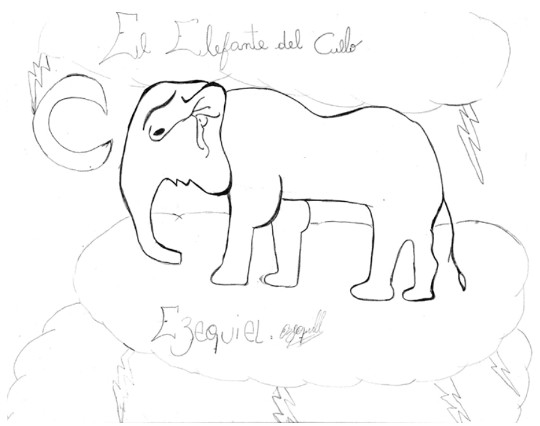
- An illustration of Kasogonagá, depicted as an elephant on a cloud, drawn by an 11-year-old Toba boy.
- Animals: Elephant or Anteater
- Gender: Female
- Region: Argentina
- Ethnic group: Toba people

Kasogonagá (also spelled as Gasogonaga, Qasoxonaxa, and many other variations) is a Toba weather goddess. She appears to shamans, or pio’oxonak, in visions induced by psychoactive plants, and is described as a colorful animal with a mouth that shoots lightning. She is also closely associated with the Andes mountains.

== Description ==
The type of animal that Kasogonagá is varies by location and oral tradition. According to some members of the Toba people, Kasogonagá appears as a multicolored elephant that throws lightning from her mouth. These attributes are related to the rain and rainbows. Alternatively, Kasogonagá is also described as an anteater that lives in the sky. Sometimes she is even said to be a pig.

== Mythology ==
A myth tells of how a man found Kasogonagá on the ground, having fallen from her cloud. She asked the man to build a bonfire so that she could ride the smoke and return to the sky. The man did as she asked, and placed her on top of the bonfire. In her gratitude, she made it rain, and told the man that if he needed anything, he could just ask her. The man was gifted with the powers of a shaman.

One other myth states that six Toba women went out to gather fruit, but were captured by the Argentinian military. They walked for "three moons" while their captors rode on horseback, and the women were tied to a wooden structure at a concentration camp. One night, one of the women communicated with the deity Kasogonagá, who helped them escape that very night.

Yet another story tells of how the provincial government sent a hundred police to evict a group of indigenous people who had occupied a school for several days. When the police occupied the school, the Toba people prayed to Kasogonagá and the deity created an electrical storm that made the police stay inside. This gave the people enough time to set up road blocks to trap the police in place. The storm did not stop until the people had set up two road blocks, one on each side of the road, trapping the police.
