= Guruvayur Padmanabhan =

Elephant in Kerala, India (1940s–2020)

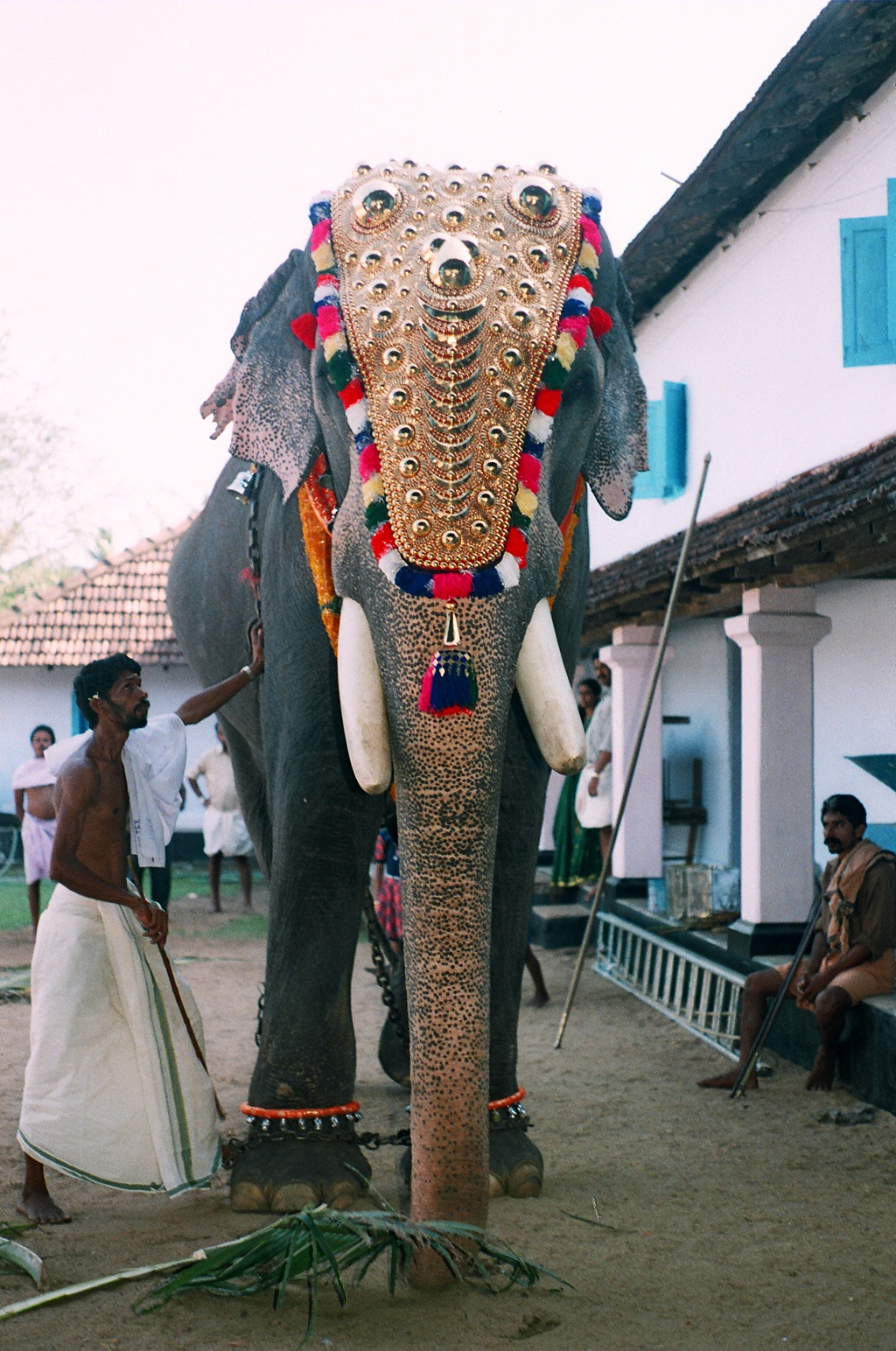
- Padmanabhan in 2011
- Species: Elephas maximus (Asian Elephant)
- Sex: Male
- Born: 1940s Nilambur, Kerala
- Died: 26 February 2020; Guruvayur
- Nationality: India
- Known for: Thrissur Pooram and other Poorams
- Predecessor: Guruvayur Keshavan
- Owner: Guruvayur Devaswom
- Height: 2.98 m (9 ft 9 in)

Guruvayur Padmanabhan popularly known as Gajaratnam Padmanabhan was the leader of the elephants of Guruvayur temple in Kerala after the death of the famous temple elephant named Guruvayur Kesavan in 1976. The elephant carried the idol of Vishnu for 66 years.

== Background ==
Padmanabhan was born in the forests of Nilambur. From there it was brought to Alatur in Palakkad before being transported by a single bridge. In 1954 at the age of 14 it was given to the Guruvayur temple. In Thrissur Puram, a regular presence, the elephant would spend the night at Thiruvambadi in the late 1990s. Padmanabhan is also known for fetching the highest amount an elephant can fetch for a festival in Kerala at that time. The elephant received ₹2,22,222 to participate in the April 2004 Vallangi festival at Nemmara village. On 26 February 2020, Padmanabhan died of age-related complications at the age of 80.
