= Rajendran (surname) =

Rajendran is an Indian family name and surname found mostly amongst South Indian people. The word means brave, big, sublime, fear, evil, loud, rough, bright, cold, strong, active, moving, heavy, mighty etc.

== Notable people ==
- A. Rajendran, Indian politician
- A.R. Rajendran, Indian film editor, worked in the film Saajan
- C. P. Rajendran, Indian geologist
- C. Rajendran, Indian politician
- C. V. Rajendran, Indian film director
- K. P. Rajendran, Indian politician
- Kusala Rajendran, Indian seismologist
- Lenin Rajendran, Indian film director and screenwriter
- M. D. Rajendran, Indian musical artist
- M. M. Rajendran, Indian politician
- M. S. K. Rajendran, Indian politician
- Mathivanan Rajendran, Indian actor
- N. P. Rajendran, Indian journalist
- Nawab Rajendran, social activist and journalist from Kerala, India
- P. G. Rajendran, Indian politician
- P. Rajendran, Indian politician
- P. V. Rajendran, Indian politician
- R. Rajendran, Indian politician for AIADMK
- S. K. Rajendran, Indian politician
- S. N. Rajendran, Indian politician
- S. Rajendran (AIADMK politician)
- S. Rajendran (CPI politician)
- S. Rajendran (CPI(M) politician)
- S. S. Rajendran, Indian politician
- Saba Rajendran, Indian politician
- Thrissur C. Rajendran, Indian musician
- Viduthalai Rajendran

== See also ==
- Rajendran Raja
