= Jayathu =

Elephant given to Ronald Reagan by Sri Lanka

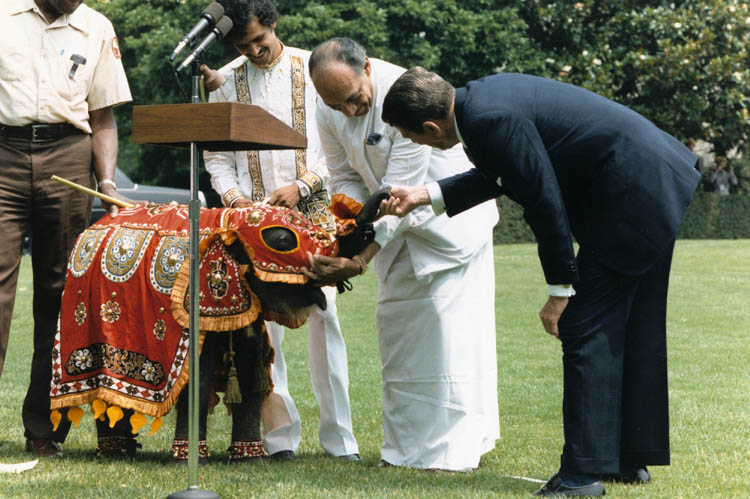
- President Jayewardene presents Jayathu to President Reagan on the south lawn
- Species: Elephas maximus
- Sex: Female
- Born: 1983; Sri Lanka
- Died: August 30, 1984; Smithsonian National Zoological Park
- Cause of death: Schistosomiasis
- Known for: Elephant of US president, Ronald Reagan

Jayathu (1983 – August 30, 1984) was a baby elephant given to Ronald Reagan by the president of Sri Lanka, J. R. Jayewardene, as a state gift.

== Life ==
Jayathu was an Asian elephant born sometime in 1983 in Sri Lanka. Local farmers scared away her herd and Jayathu fell into a pit but was rescued and taken into an elephant orphanage. She was later sent via airplane to the National Zoological Park in Washington D.C.

Jayathu, a name that can be translated to "Victory", was eighteen months old by the time she was gifted by J. R. Jayewardene, president of Sri Lanka, to Ronald Reagan and the American people on a state visit to the US on 12 June 1984. The elephant was the symbol of the parties of both presidents, Jayewardene's United National Party and Reagan's Republican Party.

== Death ==
A little bit over two months after being gifted to Ronald Reagan, on 30 August 1984, Jayathu died of schistosomiasis in the Smithsonian National Zoological Park. Her death was surrounded by disbelief and mystery.

The Sri Lankan ambassador, Ernest Corea, noted that "while 'all animals are special' to the residents of his Asian island nation, elephants are 'very special'." He described himself as "very saddened" by the death of Jayathu.

The death remained a mystery until it was later discovered that the cause of death was schistosomiasis, a parasitic fluke infection, apparently acquired before departing for the United States.

== See also ==
- List of individual elephants
