= Chinna Thambi (elephant) =

Chinna Thambi (or Chinnathambi), which means "younger brother" in Tamil, is a kumki elephant from India. Formerly a rogue crop-raider, he was captured by forest officials in Coimbatore south Tamilnadu and translocated to kraal at Varakaliyar elephant camp near Topslip. He escaped and walked more than 100 km (62 mi) back to the place where he had been captured in search of his family. This elephant was both loved and feared by the villagers.

== History ==
Chinna Thambi (or Chinnathambi) was born in Coimbatore and began raiding and destroying crops there. Based on the public concerns, the elephant was first captured from Thadagam village on 25 January 2019 and translocated to the Topslip tiger reserve. He was released into the Varakaliyaru forest area. However, in search of his family, he started walking back to its earlier territory and went around the Udumalai and Krishnapuram areas, covering over 100 km (62 mi) in three days. The forest department again returned him back to the forest area but he always walked back. Later, he was captured from Sarkar Kannadipur village (near Madathukulam, Tirupur) and shifted to a kraal near Topslip.

== Kumki ==
Chinna Thambi was to be trained as a kumki elephant but a petition was filed in Chennai High court against the conversion. The Tamil Nadu government said he would, instead be released into the forest again and would not be trained as a kumki.

However, by 2023, Chinna Thambi (Chinnathambi) was indeed a kumki and it was announced that he would be replacing the retiring kumki extraordinaire Kaleem.
