= Chengalloor Dakshayani =

Oldest known elephant in captivity

- Species: Elephas maximus (Asian Elephant)
- Sex: Female
- Born: c. 1930; Travancore
- Died: February 5, 2019 (aged 88–89); Pappanamcode, Kerala
- Nationality: India
- Known for: Oldest known elephant in captivity
- Owner: Travancore Devaswom Board

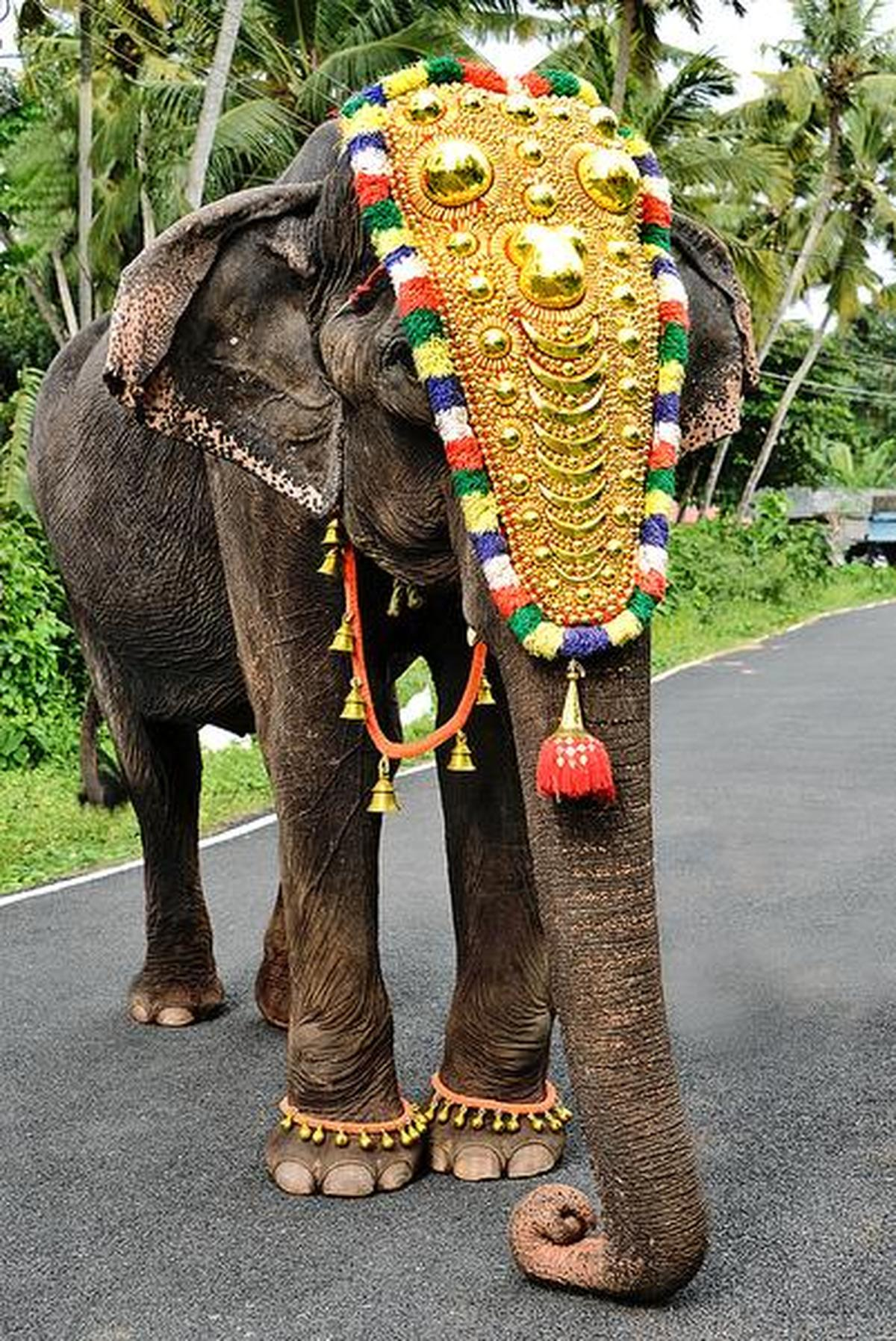

Chengalloor Dakshayani (c.1930 – 5 February 2019) was a female Asian elephant owned by Travancore Devaswom Board and kept at the Chenkalloor Mahadeva Temple in Thiruvananthapuram in Kerala, India, which at the time of her death on 5 February 2019 was believed to be the oldest elephant in captivity in Asia. She was also known as Gaja Raja Dakshayani and as "Dakshayanamma" (mother Dakshayani) and "Gaja Muthassi" (elephant grandmother).

== Life ==
The Travancore royal family bought the elephant calf at Kodanad elephant camp, near Ernakulam, and donated her to their Thiruvarattu Kavu temple at Attingal in 1949, when she was 19 years old; she was transferred to the Chenkalloor Mahadeva Temple in the late 1960s. The State Forest Department registered her age as 76 on 18 July 2007. In 2016, when she became the oldest known elephant in Asia, the Board applied to Guinness World Records to have her recorded as the oldest elephant in captivity, a record previously held by Lin Wang of the Taipei Zoo, who died in 2003 at the age of 86. The Universal Records Forum, based in Kolkata, certified her as the oldest elephant in captivity; by some accounts she was certified the record holder by Guinness and a postal cover was issued to celebrate the event. The temple also prepared to give her a larger enclosure where she would not be chained.

Chengalloor Dakshayani was still participating in temple rituals in 2017, but her parading was restricted after 2015. There were complaints that it was cruel not to retire her. In her last years she had trouble moving and her food was supplemented by hand feeding of pineapples and carrots. She died at around 3 p.m. on 5 February 2019, after collapsing in her shelter in a care facility in Pappanamcode; she was 87, 88 or 89.

== See also ==
- List of individual elephants
