= Guruvayur Keshavan =

Historic elephant in Kerala, India

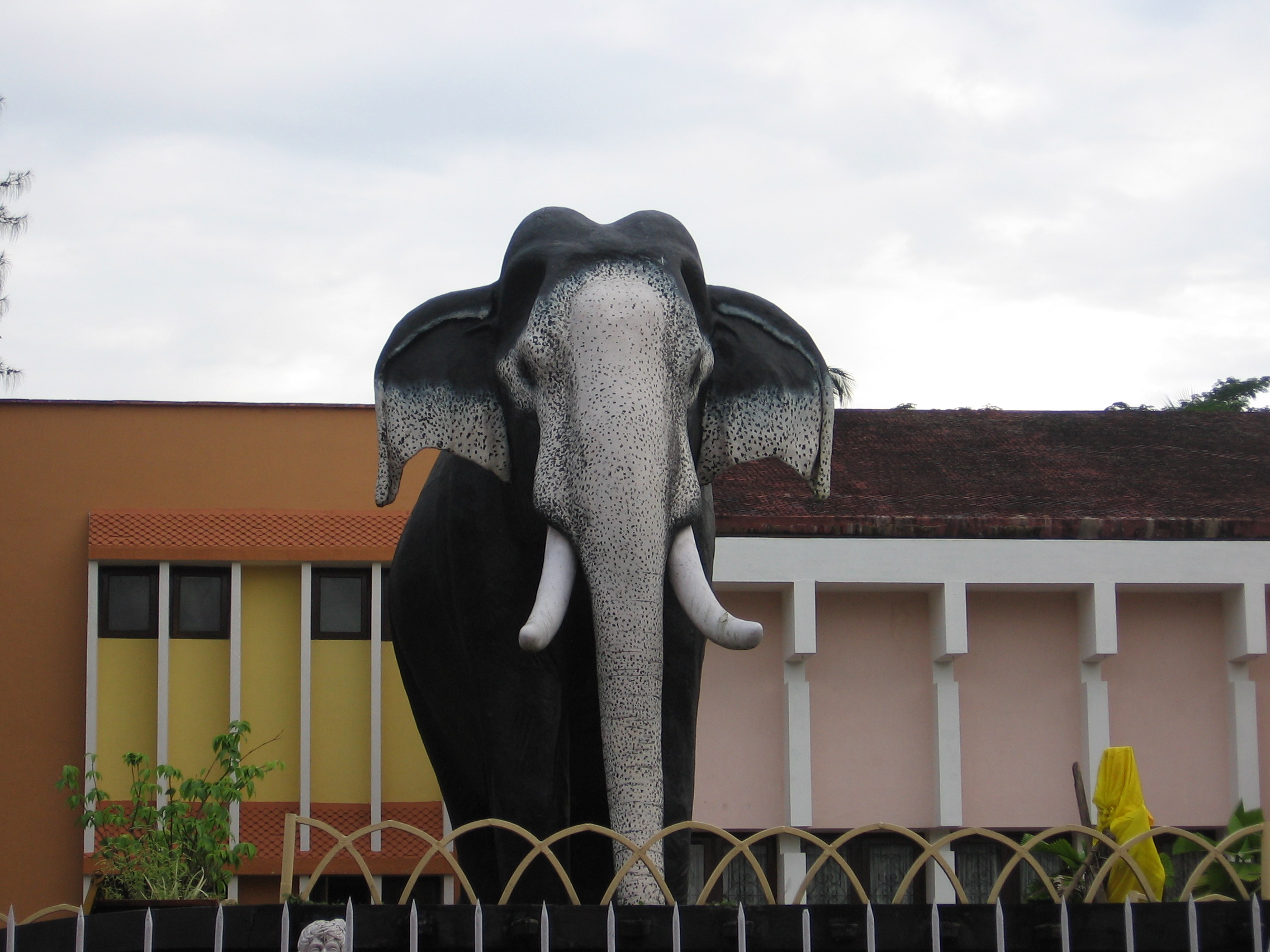
- Guruvayur Keshavan's statue
- Species: Elephas maximus (Asian Elephant)
- Sex: Male
- Born: c. 1912; Kerala
- Died: December 2, 1976 (aged 63–64); Guruvayur
- Resting place: Nilambur, Kerala
- Nationality: India
- Known for: Thrissur Pooram, Thripunithura Valiya Utsavam, Aarattupuzha, Kizhoor Nenmara and other Poorams
- Predecessor: Guruvayur Valiya Padmanabhan
- Successor: Guruvayur Padmanabhan
- Owner: Guruvayur Devaswom
- Weight: 7 tons
- Height: 3.28 m (10 ft 9 in)
- Named after: Keshavan

Gajarajan Guruvayur Keshavan (c.1912—2 December 1976) was a temple elephant in Kerala, India, and perhaps the most famous and celebrated of all temple elephants in Kerala. He was donated to the Guruvayur temple by the royal family of Nilambur on 4 January 1922.

Standing over 3.28 meters tall, he was one of the tallest elephants that lived in Kerala and was known for his devout behavior. As Keshavan's name and fame increased, the Devaswom board gave him the unique title Gajarajan (King of elephants) in 1973. Keshavan died on 2 December 1976, which happened to be Guruvayur Ekadasi, considered a very auspicious day. The anniversary of his death is still mourned in Guruvayur. Many elephants line up before the statue and the chief elephant garlands it. After his death, Guruvayur Padmanabhan became the successor of Guruvayur Keshavan.

== Life ==
Guruvayur Keshavan was captured from Nilambur forest and taken to the famous Nilambur Royal family as their 12th elephant. According to Guruvayur lore, Valiya Raja of Nilambur once prayed to the Lord to save his family and property from the enemies' attack. He promised to offer one of his many elephants if his wish was fulfilled. When his wish was fulfilled, he offered Keshavan to the temple on 4 January 1922.

Keshavan reportedly bent his front-legs only before those who held the Lord's Thidambu to enable them to climb upon him and all others were to climb by his hind-legs. He was said to have never caused any bodily harm to anyone and had the ability to lift his head a much height as possible for hours while carrying Thidambu.

Legend says Keshavan defeated Akhori Govindan, a famous elephant from outside of Guruvayur in the 1930's Aanayottam. In 1973, Keshavan became the first elephant to get honoured with the unique title "Gajarajan" (Elephant King), by the Guruvayur Devaswom. During the Guruvayur Ekadasi of 1976, Keshavan fell ill and was about to tremble during the deity procession. He was immediately taken to the stable where he fasted for the night and died few days later on 2 December 1976. He fasted for the entire day and dropped down facing the direction of the temple with his trunk raised as a mark of prostration.

The anniversary of his death is celebrated on the evening of every year's Ekadasi by the elephants of Guruvayur Devaswom lining up before Keshavan's statue and the chief elephant garlanding it, thus paying tribute.

== Legacy ==
The Guruvayur Devaswom erected a life-size statue of Keshavan in its precincts as tribute to the services he rendered to the presiding deity of the temple. His tusks, along with a majestic portrait of the elephant, can be still seen adorning the entrance to the main temple enclosure. Its life is the subject of the 1977 Malayalam feature film Guruvayur Kesavan, released the year after his death. The film was directed by Bharathan. Nayarambalam Shivaji played Gajarajan Guruvayur Keshavan.

The story of Gajarajan Guruvayur Keshavan was portrayed in a television serial on Surya TV (2009—2010), as scripted by Pradeep Sivasankar.

== See also ==
- Cultural depictions of elephants
- Elephants in Kerala culture
- Guruvayur Temple
- List of individual elephants
