= Thechikottukavu Ramachandran =

Tallest living captive elephant in India

Thechikottukavu "Raman" Ramachandran
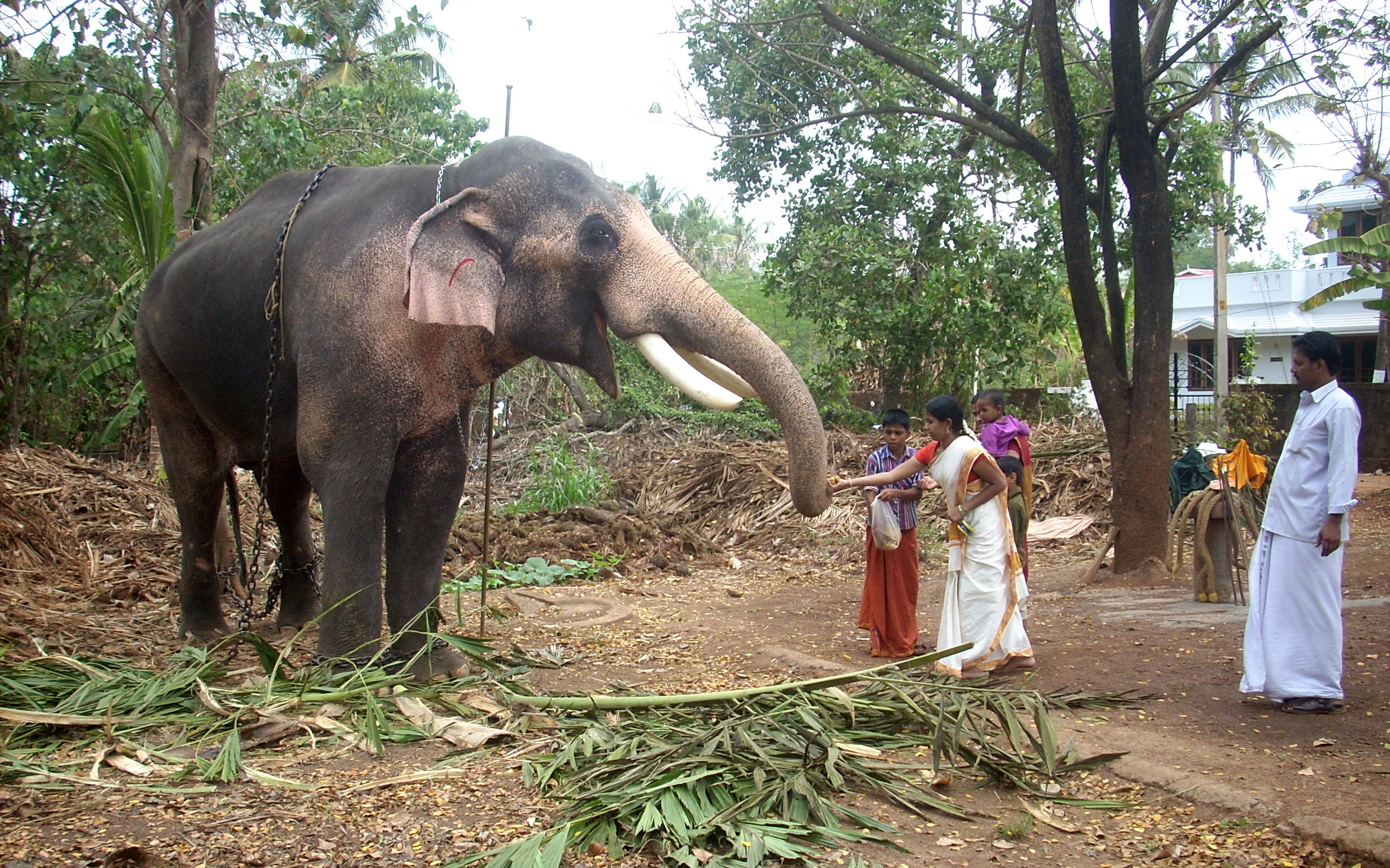
- Species: Elephas maximus (Asian elephant)
- Sex: Male
- Born: c. 1964 (age 61–62); Bihar, India
- Nationality: India
- Years active: 1984–present
- Known for: Thrissur Pooram, other Poorams
- Owners: Thechikkottukavu Devasom, Kerala, India
- Height: Reported as 314–320.5 cm (10 ft 3 in – 10 ft 6 in)
- Named after: Raman

Thechikottukavu Ramachandran (born c. 1964), commonly called Raman, is a captive bull Asian elephant owned by the Thechikottukavu Devaswom, which manages the Peramangalam Thechikottukavu Bhagavathy temple in Thrissur district, Kerala. He is reported to be the tallest captive elephant in India and is one of the most sought-after elephants for temple festivals in Kerala, with a large fan following. He performed the Poora Vilambaram ritual that opens Thrissur Pooram each year from 2014 to 2019.

Ramachandran is blind in one eye and has failing sight in the other. He has been involved in several fatal incidents at festivals. The figure most often reported is 13 people and three elephants killed, although published estimates vary. He has been barred from public parading on several occasions by the Kerala High Court, the state forest department and the Thrissur district administration, and each restriction has later been lifted or relaxed. Animal welfare groups have campaigned for his retirement, while his owners, elephant owners' associations and fans have defended his continued use.

== Early life and acquisition ==
Accounts of his origin differ. Some reports say he was born in Assam and raised in Bihar; others describe him as born in Bihar. In Bihar he was called Moti Prasad. At about 18 years of age he was bought at the Sonepur fair by K. N. Venkitadri, an elephant contractor, who brought him to Kerala in 1982 or 1983 and renamed him Ganeshan. About a year later Venkitadri sold him to the Thechikottukavu Devaswom, which renamed him Ramachandran. The sale took place on 31 October 1984; South First reported the price as ₹70,000.

== Physical characteristics and health ==
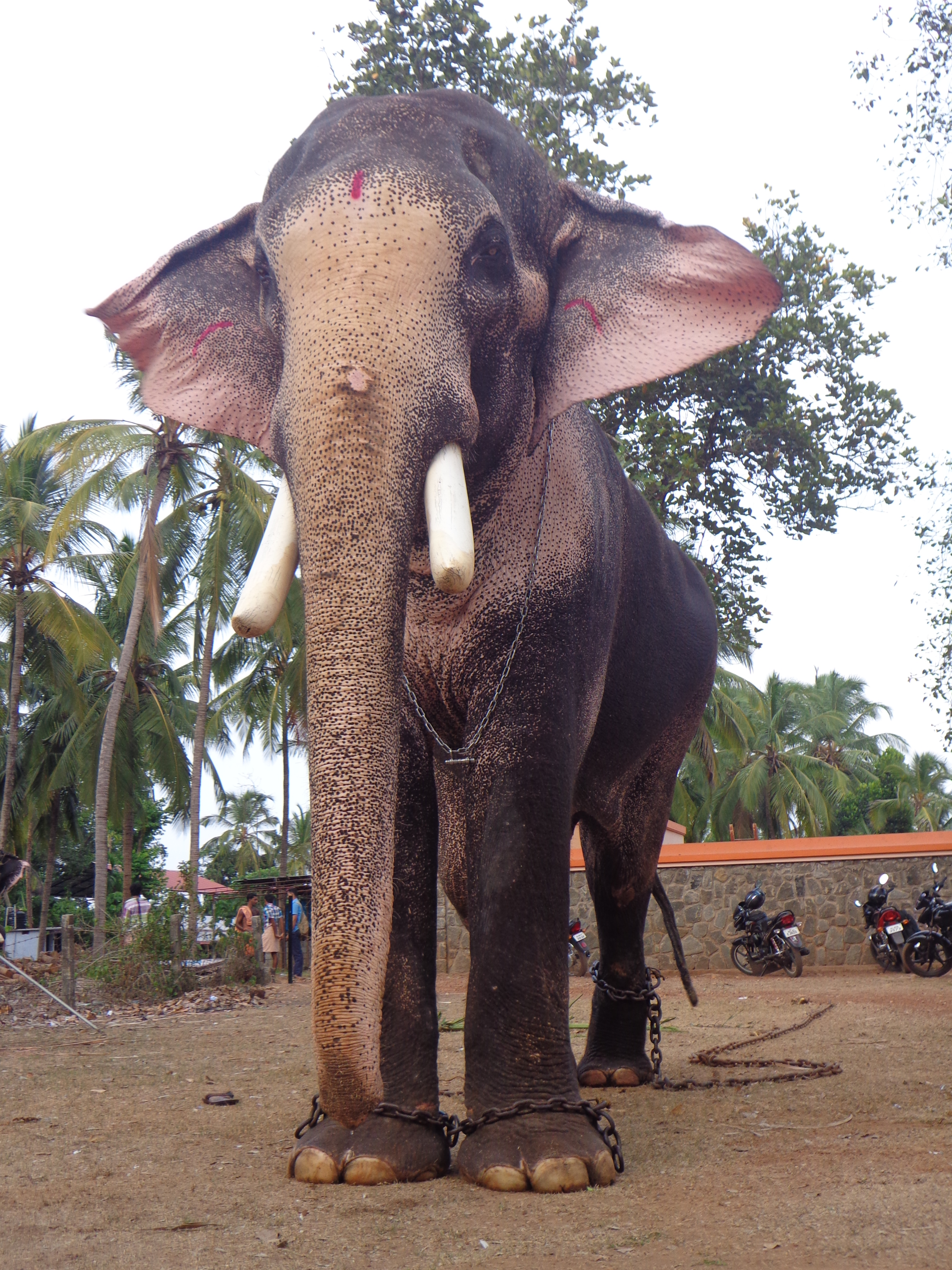
Thechikottukavu Ramachandran

Published figures for his height range from 314 cm to 320.5 cm. His owners have claimed that no other elephant in Asia is as tall.

According to his former owner and to temple officials, Ramachandran understood commands only in Hindi and Bhojpuri when he arrived in Kerala. A mahout who did not speak those languages struck him in the eye with a stick; the wound became infected and he lost sight in that eye. Venkitadri said the mahout was dismissed. Accounts from 2012 and 2018 identify the injured eye as the left. A Forest Department report placed before the High Court in 2022 described the right eye as blind, as did an expert committee report of March 2019 cited by PETA India. By 2018 the other eye was reported to have a cataract. V. K. Venkitachalam of the Heritage Animal Task Force, an elephant welfare group, has said that the elephant treats anything approaching him as a threat because he cannot see it, and that this explains many of the deaths attributed to him.

In 2012 Open reported that his musth lasted from August to December each year, during which he was kept chained and not taken to festivals.

== Festival career ==
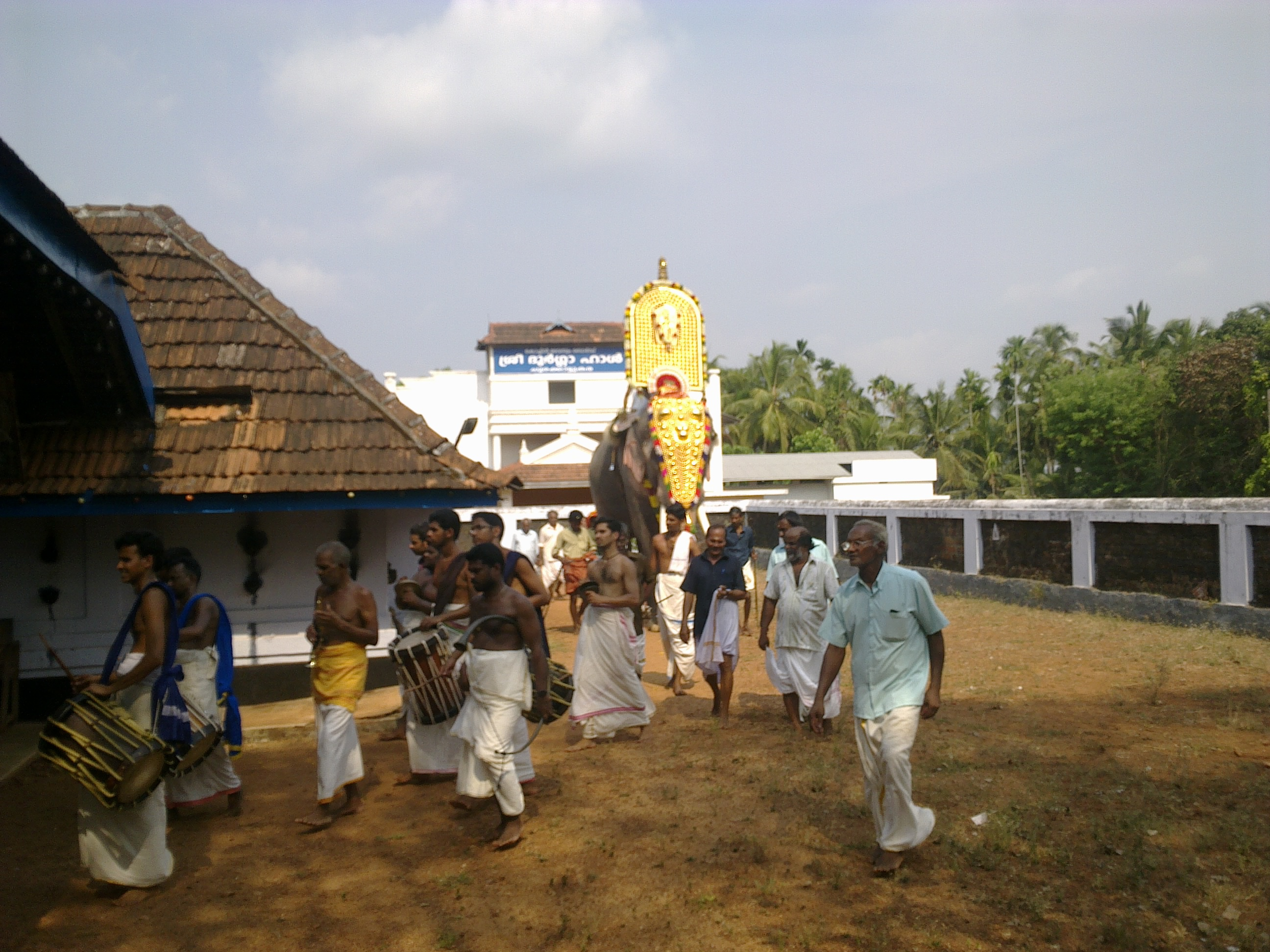
Ramachandran at Ramanchira temple, Thrissur, in 2011

Ramachandran is used mainly to carry the thidambu (idol) of a deity in temple processions. In 2012 he attended 73 festivals by late May, and in 2018 he was reported to take part in 70 to 80 festivals a season. In 2012 the Paramekkavu and Thiruvambadi temples, the two main participants in Thrissur Pooram, did not use him, and he appeared mostly at smaller festivals.

He first took part in Thrissur Pooram in 2014, carrying the idol of Neythalakavu Bhagavathy and pushing open the southern gate (Thekke Gopura Nada) of the Vadakkumnathan Temple in the Poora Vilambaram ritual. About 50,000 people watched him perform the ritual in 2018. Kerala Kaumudi described his 2019 appearance as his sixth. In 2023 another elephant, Ernakulam Sivakumar, performed the ritual for the third time, while Ramachandran was set to take part in the main Pooram the next day. He carried the idol of Neythalakavu Bhagavathy at the 2024 Pooram, and in 2025 carried the idol of Chembukkavu Bhagavathy for the first time.

His fee for a single festival was reported as ₹2.5 lakh in 2019. In February 2023 the Sree Vishwanatha temple at Chavakkad hired him for ₹6.75 lakh at an auction in which 35 temple committees took part; the hiring temple also had to pay for a ten-member elephant squad, an ambulance and handlers. South First described it as the highest bid recorded for an elephant. His earnings helped the Devaswom build an auditorium and buy a truck and another elephant.

Fans call him Ekachathrathipathi ("the only emperor"). Fan associations erect boards with his picture, and several Facebook pages are devoted to him. Temple committees bid for his presence at festivals.

== Incidents ==
Published counts of the people and elephants killed by Ramachandran vary. The figure most often given is 13 people and three elephants, used by The News Minute, the Deccan Herald and South First between 2019 and 2022. South First stated that six of the 13 were mahouts, while The News Minute reported that two assistant mahouts had been killed. Lower figures have also been published. Open attributed three human deaths to him in 2012, the Deccan Herald put the total at "about ten" in February 2019, and Mathrubhumi reported seven human deaths and four elephants gored in May 2019. In 2019 P. Sasikumar, president of the Kerala Elephant Owners' Federation, said the elephant had killed six or seven people and no mahouts. No published source gives a full list of victims or a count of the times he has run amok.

The following incidents have been reported in reliable sources:

Year	Place	Reported outcome
1998	Thrissur Pooram, Thrissur	Gored the elephant Thiruvambadi Chandrasekharan while the two were paraded side by side. Chandrasekharan fell ill and died the following year. The Thiruvambadi Devaswom took the Thechikottukavu temple to court, but the case failed for lack of evidence. Ramachandran's owners said another elephant had struck him from behind.
2009	Temple festival, Palakkad district	A 17-year-old boy was killed after firecrackers were thrown near the elephant.
Before 2012	Temple festival, Ernakulam district	Picked up an elderly woman with his trunk and threw her down; she died at the scene.
2013	Thaipooyam festival, Perumbavoor, Ernakulam district	Three women were killed. Those who had paraded the elephant were made to pay ₹10 lakh in compensation.
2019 (8 February)	Kottappadi, near Guruvayur, Thrissur district	Ran amok at a housewarming beside the Chembalakulangara temple festival, after firecrackers were burst in a neighbouring compound. Two men, aged 66 and 60, were killed and between seven and nine others were injured. Police registered a case against the mahout for causing death by negligence.
2023 (24 February)	Padoor Vela, Palakkad district	Reported to have run amok in a procession after another elephant trumpeted behind him. His 63-year-old mahout was seriously injured and two women were hurt. The festival committee said the elephant that ran amok was a different, similar-looking animal and that the injuries were minor.

=== Attack on the elephant ===
In August 2015 his mahouts found blade fragments in his rice feed while he was undergoing sukha chikitsa, a rejuvenation treatment. The temple filed a police complaint. The president of the temple committee said many people entered the room where the feed was prepared and that there were no cameras there.

== Bans and legal history ==
By 2016 the Kerala High Court had barred Ramachandran from public parading at least six times. In March 2017 the Idukki Society for Prevention of Cruelty to Animals petitioned the court to ban his parading. A medical team recommended a ban the same year, but he continued to be paraded.

=== 2019 ===
After the deaths at Kottappadi in February 2019, the forest department barred him from festivals for 15 days pending a medical report. In March 2019 the Chief Wildlife Warden ordered a further ban after a five-member veterinary panel declared him medically unfit. The Thrissur district monitoring committee, chaired by the district collector, T. V. Anupama, then decided he should not be paraded at that year's Thrissur Pooram.

The decision became a political dispute. The Bharatiya Janata Party held protests, and the Kerala Elephant Owners' Federation announced that its members would withdraw all their elephants from festivals from 11 May. The Devaswom told the court that the elephant had a valid health certificate and was not completely blind. On 10 May the High Court declined to intervene and left the decision to the district collector. On the advice of the state's Advocate General, and after a team of veterinarians examined him, the collector allowed him to perform the Poora Vilambaram on 12 May for one hour, accompanied by four mahouts. He was not allowed to carry the idol in the procession that followed. The Hindu later wrote that the state government had reversed the ban after the owners' boycott call.

=== 2020–2021 ===
On 2 March 2020 the Thrissur district monitoring committee lifted the ban on conditions: he could be paraded on two days a week with weekly fitness tests, an elephant squad was to stay close to him, and police and forest officials were to be told in advance of each appearance. The relaxation did not cover Thrissur Pooram. The Devaswom was required to accept liability for any damage he caused. Temple festivals were cancelled later that year because of the COVID-19 pandemic. In February 2021 he was again permitted to be paraded twice a week in Thrissur and Palakkad districts, with four mahouts beside him, no member of the public within five metres and the Devaswom liable for any damage.

=== 2022 High Court order and later ===
In September 2022 a division bench of the High Court, Justices A. Muhamed Mustaque and Anu Sivaraman, issued an interim order banning his parading in public places. The order was based on a report by an Assistant Conservator of Forests that recommended a complete ban, and was issued on a petition by an Idukki-based animal welfare society. According to Venkitachalam, the order allowed a monitoring committee to permit his parading in unavoidable circumstances. In February 2023 the Palakkad district monitoring committee, acting on the High Court order, permitted him to be paraded on condition that he was not paraded alongside other elephants and that each parade was filmed from start to finish for the forest department.

In April 2024 the High Court required fitness certificates for every elephant at Thrissur Pooram and said it would rule separately on Ramachandran. He took part in the 2024 and 2025 Poorams.

== Welfare debate ==
Animal welfare groups have opposed his continued use. In 2019 PETA India asked the authorities to seize him and send him to a sanctuary. Venkitachalam has called for him to be retired to the elephant rehabilitation centre at Kottur in Thiruvananthapuram district. Observers cited by National Geographic said he shows signs of distress and pain during appearances, and at least one person who protested his treatment reported receiving death threats and online abuse. A veterinarian quoted by the BBC described the parading of elephants as torture. Kerala Suffering Elephants, a campaign group, has said that 12 captive elephants died in Kerala in 2018.

His keepers have said that he is well cared for and have denied that he has harmed anyone. His mahout of 17 years told Open in 2012 that the 2009 death was not the elephant's fault, and mahouts and fans have attributed the deaths to his poor sight and to firecrackers set off near him. In 2019 the president of the Elephant Owners' Federation compared his eyesight to that of a person who continues daily life despite poor vision, and said he was being treated with medicines.
