= Thrissur Pooram Exhibition =

Exhibition of native goods

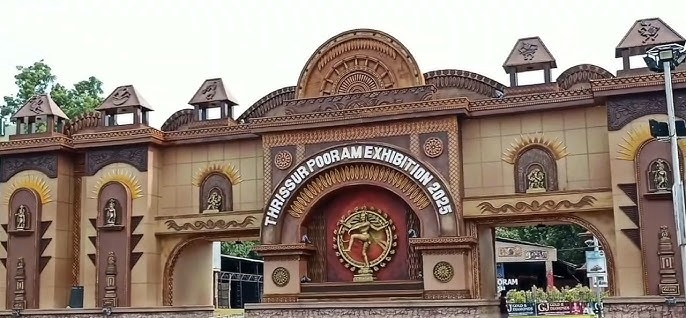
- Entrance of Thrissur Pooram Exhibition in Thekkinkadu Maidan
- Genre: Agricultural Exhibition
- Dates: April - May
- Locations: Thrissur City, Keralam
- Years active: 1932 – present
- Website: http://thrissurpooramfestival.com/thrissur_pooram.html

The All India Agricultural, Industrial, Educational and Cultural Exhibition, more commonly called the Thrissur Pooram Exhibition is an exhibition organised jointly by the Paramekkavu Bagavathi Temple Devaswom and the Thiruvambadi Sri Krishna Temple Devaswom, in Thekkinkadu Maidan in Thrissur. It is usually conducted over a period of 40 to 50 days during Thrissur Pooram. The exhibition is the largest in Keralam in terms of attendance and floor space.

== History ==
The exhibition was organised by the youths in freedom fighters in Thrissur City. It was started in 1932 and was known as Swadeshi Exhibition till 1947. Later Thrissur Municipal Corporation took over the event till 1967 and was known as All India Agricultural, Industrial and Educational Exhibition. In 1963 Thrissur Municipal Corporation handed over the exhibition to Paramekkavu and Thiruvambadi Devaswoms. From the next year onwards, it was renamed as Thrissur Pooram Exhibition.

Thrissur Pooram Exhibition 2007
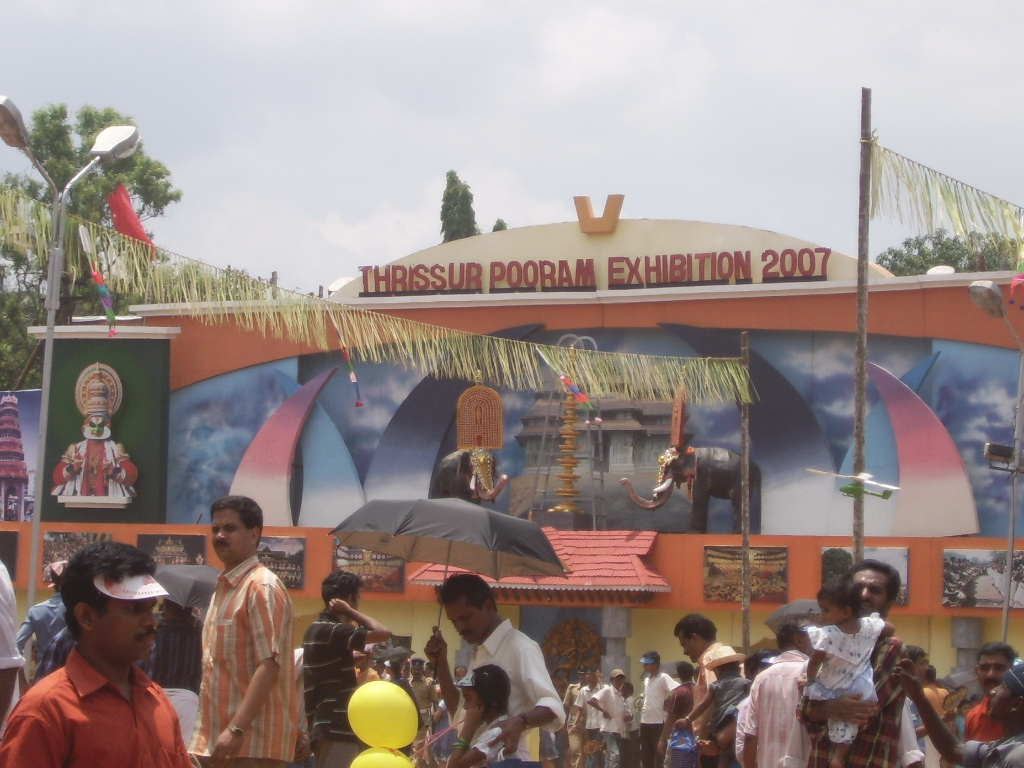

Thrissur Pooram Exhibition 2011
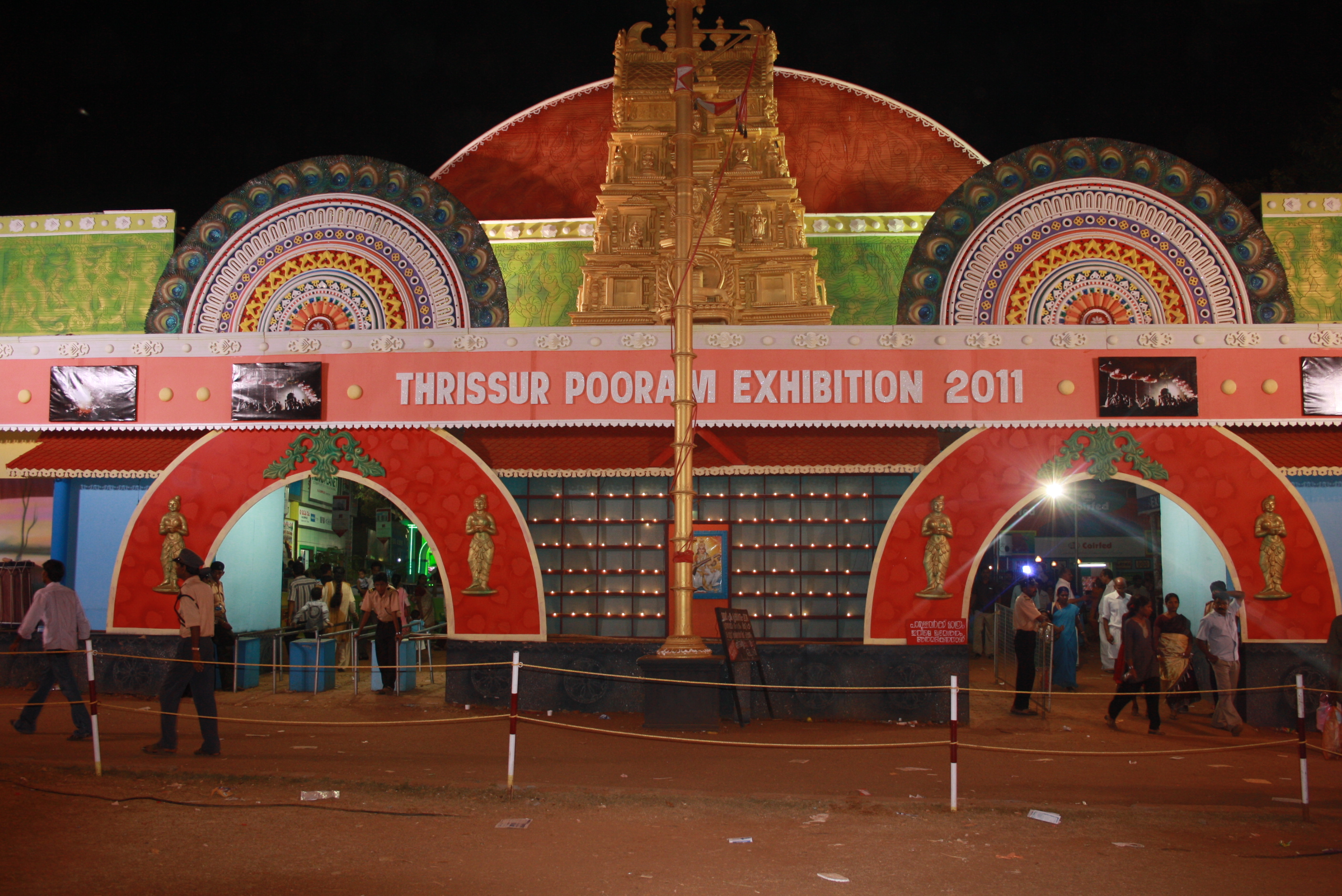

== Participating entities ==
Major participating entities include private and Government companies and departments. Some are Oushadhi, Coir Board, Kerala Police, Kerala Excise, All India Radio, Indian Railways (formerly), Bharat Petroleum, Bharat Electronics, Bharat Earth Movers, Bharat Sanchar Nigam, Kerala Forest Department, Food Corporation of India, Coconut Development Board, Hindustan Newsprint Limited, Kerala Agricultural University, Hindustan Aeronautics Limited, Indian Income-tax Department, Department of Industries (Kerala), Kerala State Pollution Control Board, Indian Space Research Organisation, Kerala Veterinary and Animal Sciences University, and Jubilee Mission Medical College and Research Institute
