= Kizhakkoottu Aniyan Marar =

Indian percussionist

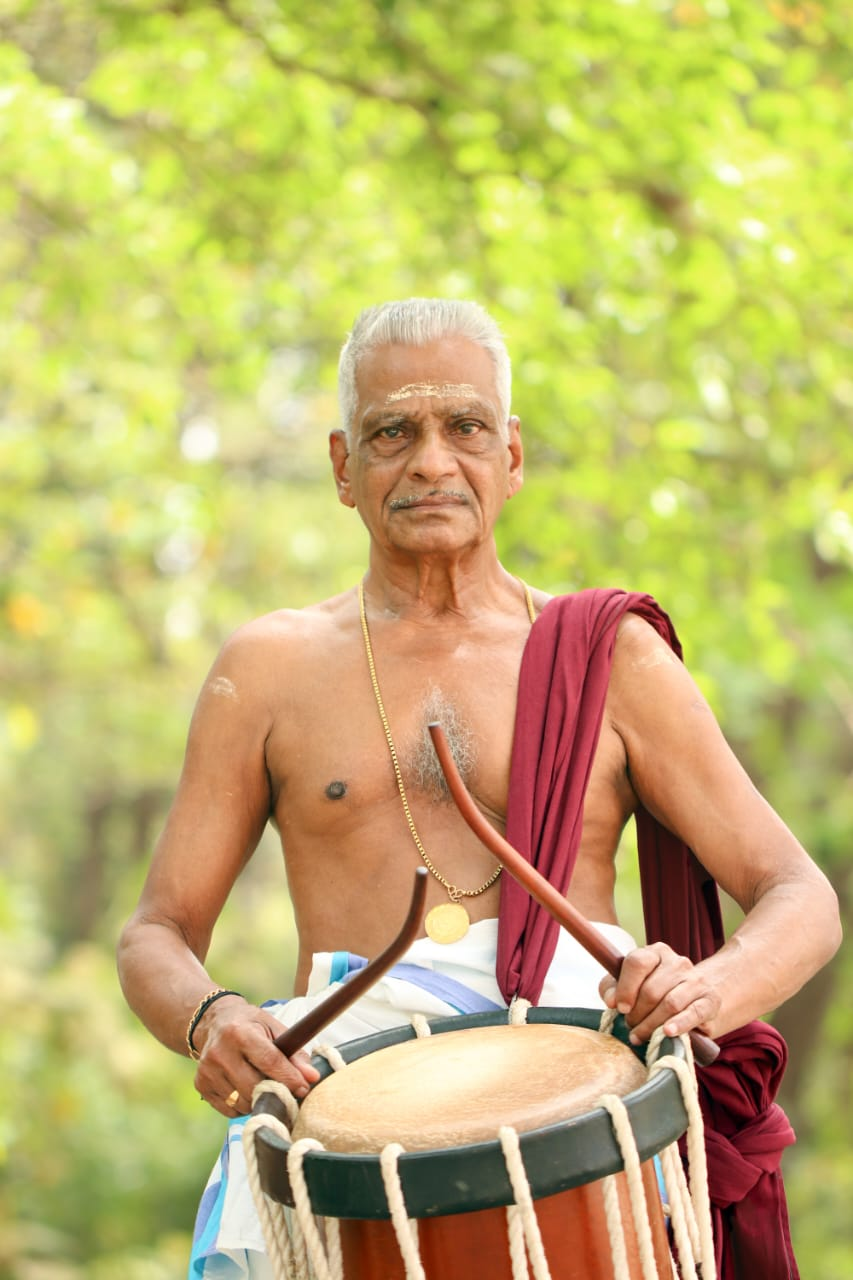
- Marar in 2022

Background information
- Born: 03/06/1946; Thrissur, Kerala, India
- Occupation: Percussion Artist
- Instrument: Chenda
- Years active: 1976–present

Kizhakkoottu Aniyan Marar (born 1946) is an Indian chenda artist from Kerala. He leads several popular traditional orchestra performances in Kerala, most notably the Thrissur Pooram. He is a recipient of several awards including the Kerala Government's highest musical award, Pallavoor Puraskaram.

== Biography ==
Marar made his debut at the Nettissery temple at the age of eleven. He presently holds the post of regular Chenda artist in the Thanikudam Bhagavathy temple. At the age of 17, Marar started performing in front of Ilanjithara melam. In 2006, he led the orchestra during the Paramekkavu Daylight Festival. In 2011, he was selected as the Melapramani (Head of orchestra) for the Thiruvambadi section for the Thrissur Pooram. In 2023, he replaced Peruvanam Kuttan Marar to become the lead performer (Pramani) of the Ilanjithara melam.

== Awards ==
Marar has won several awards including the Kerala Sangeeta Natak Academy Guru Pooja Award in 2010 and Pallavoor Puraskaram in 2020, which is the Kerala Government's highest musical award.
