= Laloor Bhagavathy Temple =

Religion
- Affiliation: Hinduism
- District: Thrissur District
- Deity: Karthyayani
- Festival: Thrissur Pooram

Location
- Location: Thrissur
- State: Kerala
- Country: India
- Interactive map of Laloor Bhagavathy Temple

Architecture
- Type: Kerala

Laloor Bhagavathy Temple is a temple to the Hindu goddess Karthyayani in Laloor, Thrissur city, Kerala, India. The Cochin Devaswom Board controls the temple. The temple is a participant in the Thrissur Pooram every year. It is one of the 108 Durga Temples in Kerala found by Parasurama.
