= Ayyanthole Karthyayani Temple =

Hindu temple in Kerala, India

Religion
- Affiliation: Hinduism
- District: Thrissur District
- Deity: Bhagavathi
- Festivals: Thrissur Pooram, Thrukkarthika Maholsavam

Location
- Location: Thrissur
- State: Kerala
- Country: India
- Interactive map of Ayyanthole Karthyayani Temple
- Coordinates: 10°31′59″N 76°11′17″E

Architecture
- Type: Kerala

Ayyanthole Karthyayani Bhagavathy Temple is a Hindu temple in Ayyanthole, Thrissur city, Kerala, India. Cochin Devaswom Board controls the temple, which is one of the 108 Durga temples in Kerala and is a participant in the annual Thrissur Pooram.
