= Ilanjithara Melam =

Assembly of percussionists

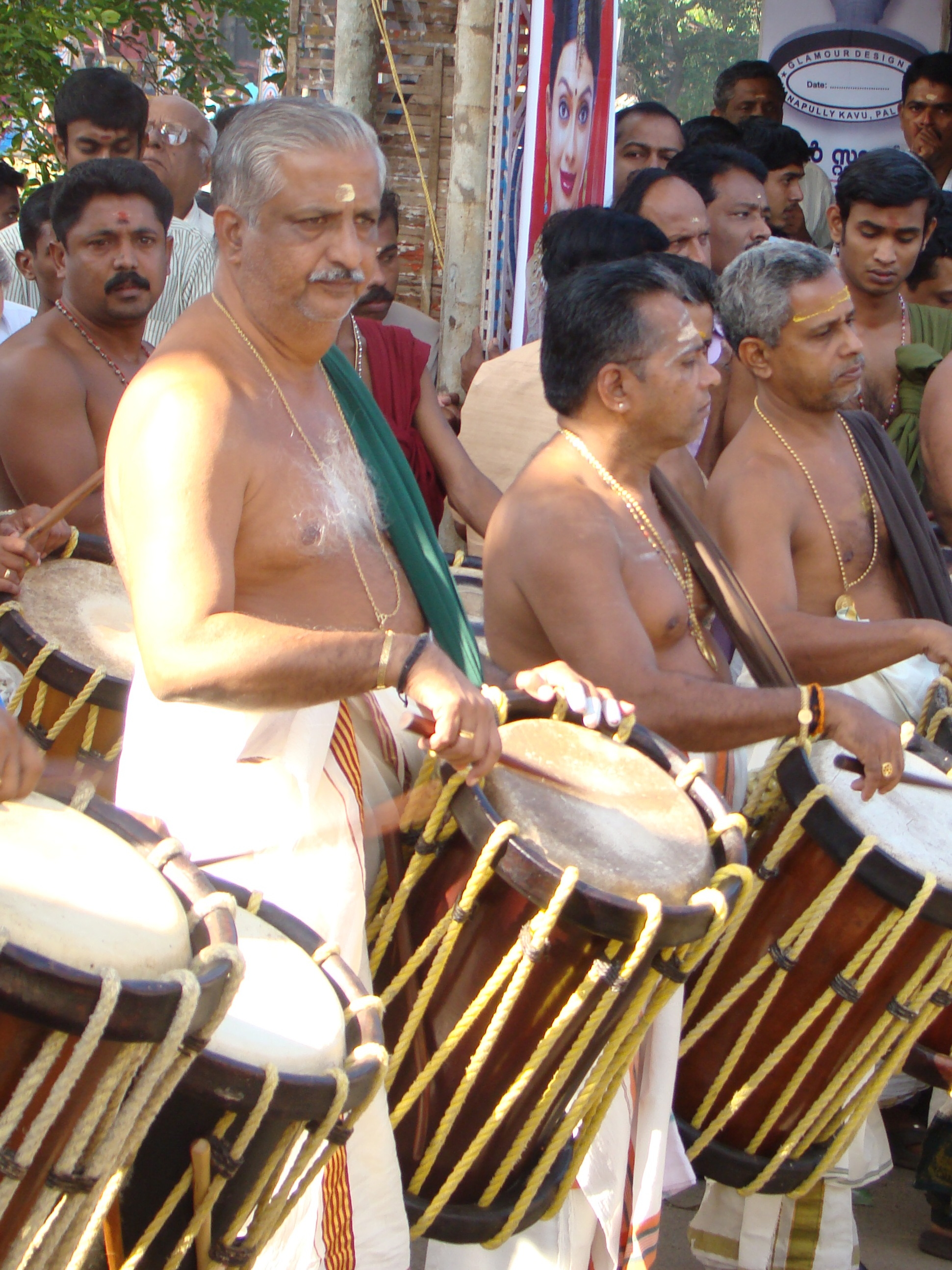
Peruvanam Kuttan Marar, leader of 'Chenda' group (1999-2022) of Paramekkavu Bagavathi Temple performing at Thrissur Pooram

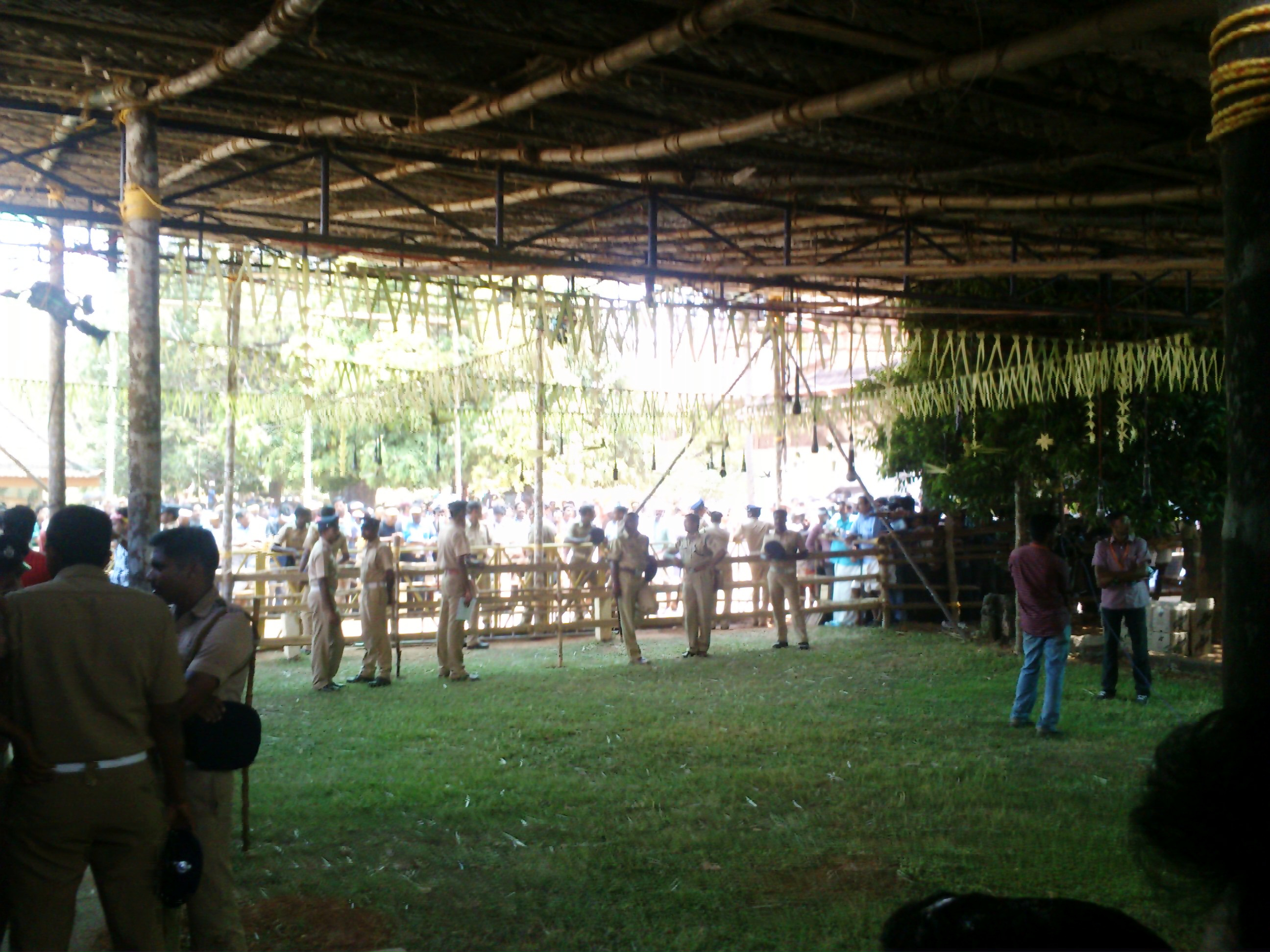
Ilanjithara where melam is performed, in the date of pooram

Ilanjithara Melam is an assembly of percussion performance artists held at Ilanji (known as Bullet Wood tree Mimusops elengi) tree at the courtyard of the Vadakkunnathan Temple in Thrissur city during the Thrissur Pooram. It is considered one of the best platforms for traditional Kerala music and the largest assembly of percussion artistes in any other Poorams. The Melam in technical exactness and instrumental discipline are the best example of Pandi Melam.

== The Melam ==
The Pandi Melam of Paramekkavu Bagavathi Temple is known as Ilanjithara Melam. The Melam begin at the Ilanjithara in the Vadakkunnathan Temple around 2.30 PM, and goes for around four continuous hours. The base of Pandi Melam is the Tripuda Thaalam. Correct number of instrumentalists participating in Melam is 222. But more than 250 instrumentalists assemble because of its prominence and various other reasons. 100 Chendas (In Edanthala and Valanthala categories), 75 Elathalams 21 Kombu and 21 Kurunkuzhal is the number of instruments in each category. There are 7 types of Melangal viz Panchari, Champa, Chempada, Adantha, Anchadatha, Druvam and Pandy. Adantha Thalam (14 Aksharas) is the Thalam performed in the Ilanjithara Melam.

== Chiefs (Pramanis) of Ilanjithara Melam ==
Kizhakkoottu Aniyan Marar is the current Chief of Ilanjithara Melam. At the age of 17, Marar started performing in front of Ilanjithara melam. In 2006, he led the orchestra during the Paramekkavu Daylight Festival. In 2011, he was selected as the Melapramani (Head of orchestra) for the Thiruvambadi section for the Thrissur Pooram. In 2023, he replaced Peruvanam Kuttan Marar to become the lead performer (Pramani) of the Ilanjithara melam. Peruvanam Kuttan marar was the Chief for 18 years and had been associated with Ilanjithara Melam for 35 years. Kuzhoor Narayana Marar, another veteran percussionist, was also part of the Paramekkavu team for 41 years. He was its Chief for 12 years.

=== Chiefs ===
- Pandaarathil Eachara Marar - 1940s
- Makkoth Nanu Marar: 1943-1956
- Peruvanam Narayana Marar
- Peruvanam Appu Marar - 1960s
- Thrippekkulam Achutha Marar
- Pallavur Appu Marar
- Peruvanam Kuttan Marar (1999-2022)
- Kizhakkoottu Aniyan Marar (2023-)
