= Chembukkavu Bhagavathy Temple =

Religion
- Affiliation: Hinduism
- District: Thrissur District
- Deity: Bhagavathi
- Festivals: Thrissur Pooram, Thrukkarthika Maholsavam, Maha Sivarathri

Location
- Location: Thrissur
- State: Kerala
- Country: India
- Interactive map of Chembukkavu Bhagavathy Temple
- Coordinates: 10.5317°N 76.2240°E

Architecture
- Type: Kerala

Chembukkavu Bhagavathy Temple is a Hindu temple in Chembukkavu, Thrissur city of Kerala, India. Cochin Devaswom Board controls the temple, which is one of the 108 Durga temples in Kerala and is a participant in the annual Thrissur Pooram.
