= Thrissur Pooram =

Indian festival

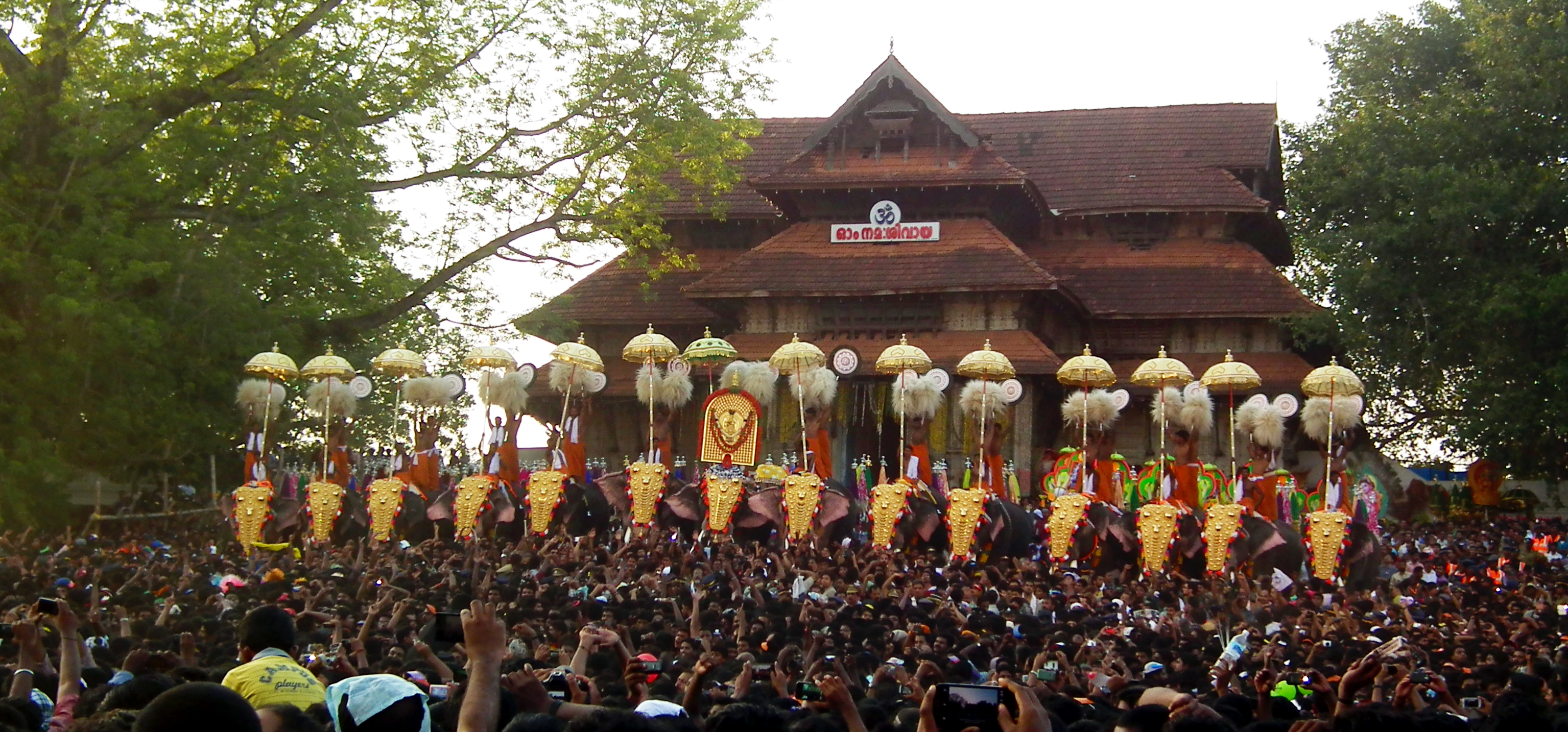
- Thrissur Pooram celebrations
- Official name: Thrissur Pooram
- Observed by: Malayalees
- Type: Hindu temple festival/public holidays in the city of Thrissur
- Significance: Largest pooram in Kerala
- Observances: Vilambaram; Kudamatam (കുടമാറ്റം); Ilanjithara Melam (ഇലഞ്ഞിത്തറമേളം); Madathil Varavu (മഠത്തില്‍ വരവ്); fireworks (വെടിക്കെട്ട്); Ezhunilappu
- Date: Pooram Nakshatra in the Malayalam Calendar month of Medam

The Thrissur Pooram is an annual Hindu temple festival held in Thrissur, Kerala, India. It is held annually at the Vadakkunnathan Temple in Thrissur on the Pooram day—the day when the moon rises with the Pooram star in the Malayalam Calendar month of Medam. Dubbed the mother of all poorams, it is the largest and best known pooram in India. Thrissur pooram is also one of the largest festivals in Asia with more than 1 million visitors. The Thrissur Pooram Exhibition is conducted over a period of 40 to 50 days during the Thrissur Pooram.

== History ==
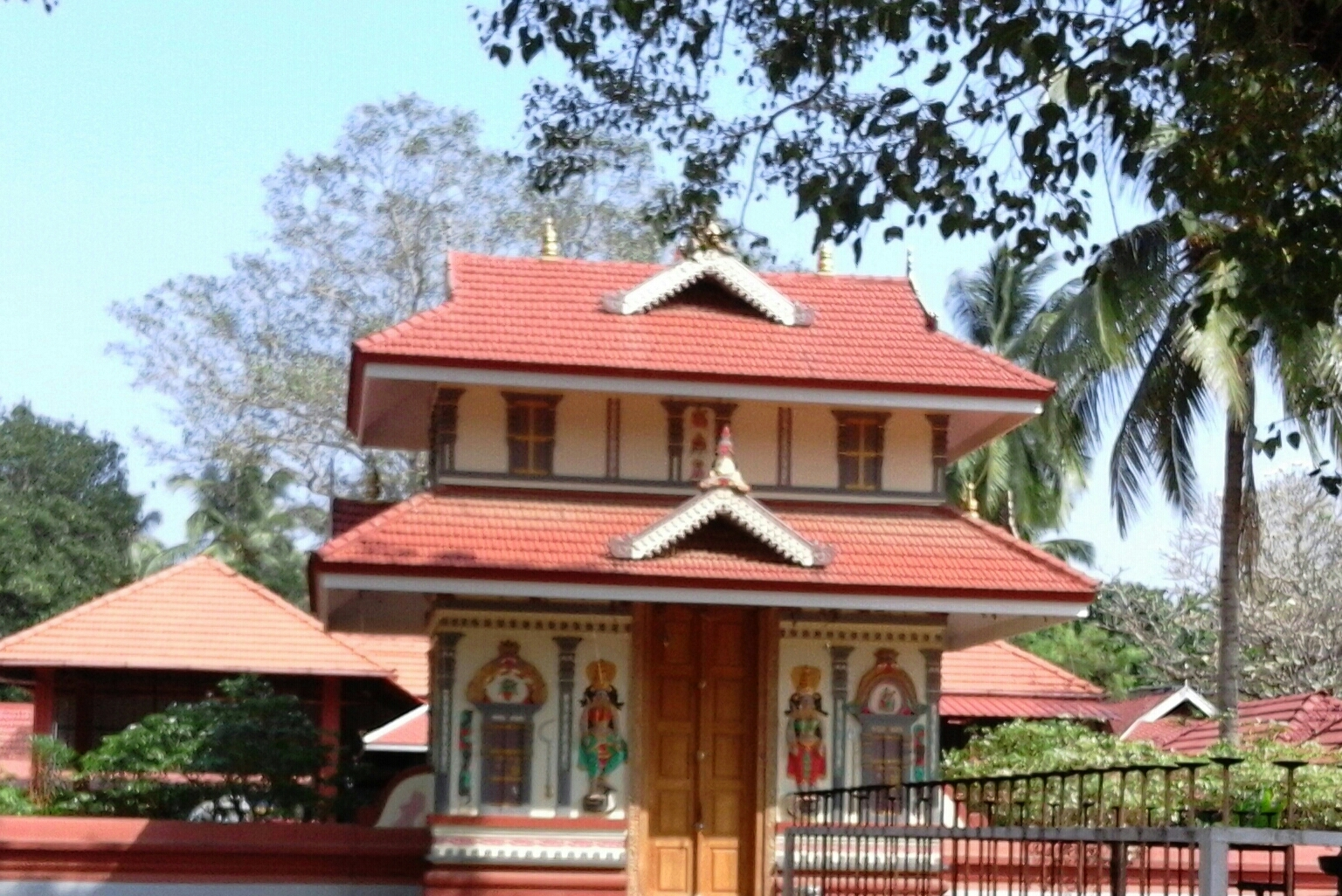
Kanimangalam Valiyalukkal Bhagavathi Temple

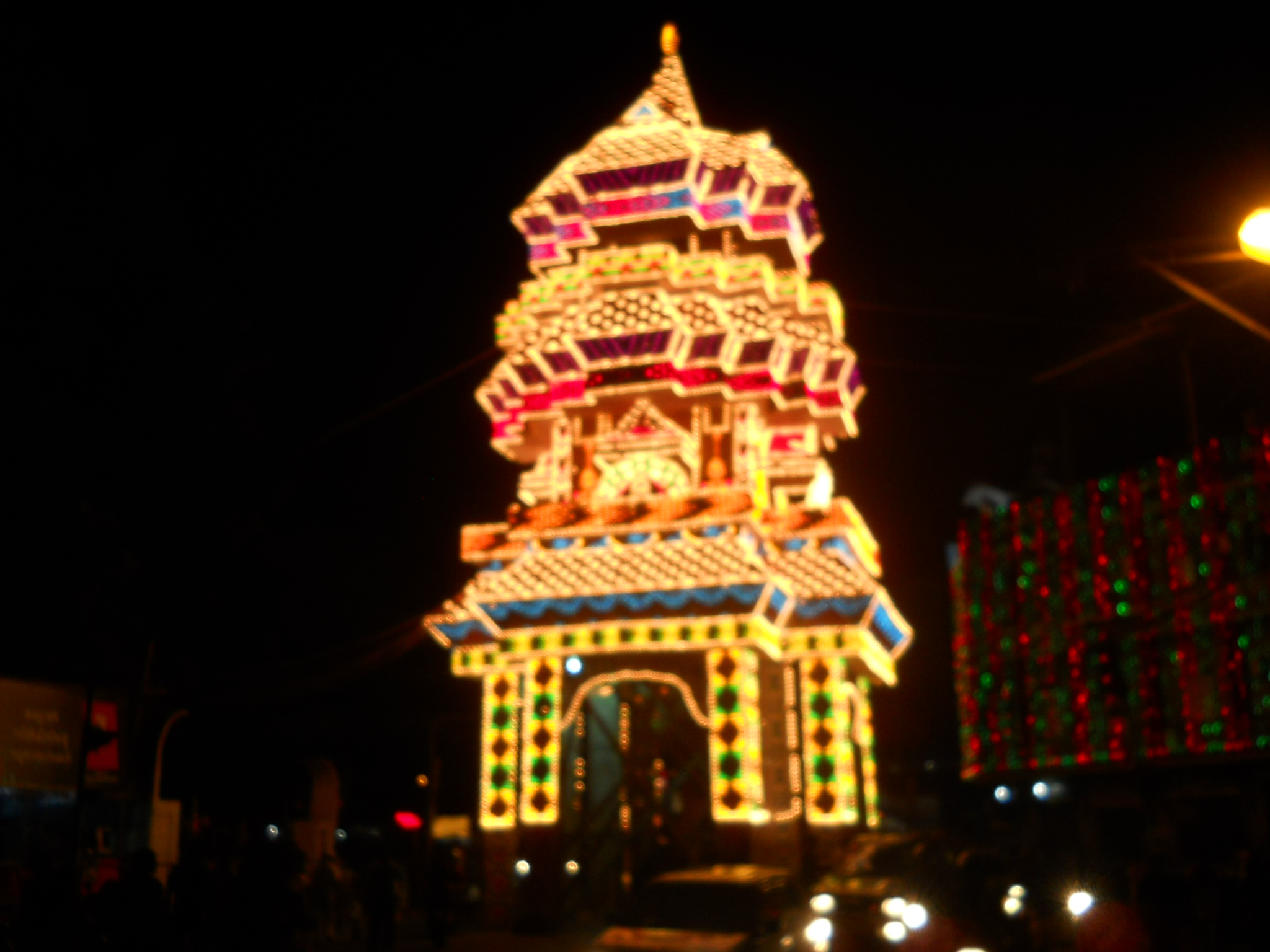
Illumination of Poora Pandal

Thrissur Pooram (തൃശ്ശൂര്‍ പൂരം) was the brainchild of Sakthan Thampuran, the Maharaja of Cochin (1790–1805). Before the start of Thrissur Pooram, the largest temple festival in Kerala was the one-day festival held at Aarattupuzha known as Arattupuzha Pooram. Temples in and around the city of Thrissur were regular participants. In the year 1796 because of incessant rains, the temples from Thrissur Groups (Paramekkavu, Thiruvambadi, Chempukkavu, Karamukku, Lalur, Ayyanthol, Chakkulathukavu, Neythalakavu and Kanimangalam Temples) were late for the Arattupuzha Pooram and were denied access to the Pooram procession. Feeling embarrassed and angered by the denial, the banned temple groups complained to Sakthan Thampuran. He decided to challenge the ban by starting Thrissur Pooram on the Pooram day in the month of May in the same year as a mass festival. He invited temples with their deities to the city of Thrissur to pay obeisance to Vadakkunnathan (Shiva), the presiding deity of the Vadakkunnathan Temple. Something unique about this festival is that everything used in the festival is made fresh every year from scratch. There are people who are given the duty to craft the umbrellas and the nettipattam.

== Participants ==
Sakthan Thampuran ordained the temples into two groups, namely "Paramekkavu side" and "Thiruvambady side". These are headed by the principal participants, Paramekkavu Bagavathi Temple at Thrissur Swaraj Round and Thiruvambadi Sri Krishna Temple at Shoranur road.

=== Western Group (Thiruvambady side) ===
- Thiruvambadi Sri Krishna Temple
- Laloor Bhagavathy Temple
- Ayyanthole Karthyayani Temple
- Neythalakkavu Bhagavathy Temple

Kanimangalam Sastha Temple

=== Eastern Group (Paramekkavu side) ===
- Paramekkavu Bhagavathy Temple
- Chembukkavu Bhagavathy Temple
- Panamukkumpally Sastha Temple
- Choorakkottukavu Bhagavathy Temple
- Pookattikkara - Karamukku Bhagavathy Temple

The Pooram is centered on the Vadakkunnathan Temple, with all these temples sending their processions to pay obeisance to the Shiva, the presiding deity. The Thampuran is believed to have chalked out the program and the main events of the Thrissur Pooram festival.

=== Flag Hoisting ===
The pooram officially begins from the event of flag hoisting (കൊടിയേറ്റം). The flag hosting ceremony (Kodiyettam) begins seven days before Thrissur Pooram. All the participating temples of Thrissur Pooram are present for the ceremony, and there is a light fireworks display to announce the commencement of the festival.

=== Poora Vilambharam ===
Poora Vilambaram is a custom where the elephant pushes open the south entrance gate at 12 PM of the Vadakkunnathan Temple, which hosts the Thrissur Pooram, with the idol of 'Neithilakkavilamma' atop it. Ernakulam Sivakumar has ceremoniously opened the thekke gopura nada (South Gate) of the Vadakkunnathan temple in the years 2019, 2021, 2022, 2023, 2024 and 2025. Another prominent elephant who has had the honour of opening the gate in the past is Thechikottukavu Ramachandran.

=== Display of fireworks (first round) ===
The first round of pyrotechnics, known as Sample Vedikettu, happens on the fourth day after the flag hoisting of the Pooram. It is a one-hour show presented by Thiruvambady and Paramekkavu Devaswoms. Swaraj Round is the venue for this fireworks and starts at 7:15 pm. The display usually has innovative patterns and varieties of fireworks. Even though there were several controversies, permission was granted to conduct Thrissur Pooram in 2017

=== Display of caparisons ===
The golden elephant caparison (Nettipattam), elephant accoutrements (Chamayam), ornamental fan made of peacock feathers (Aalavattom), royal fan (Venchamarom), sacred bells and decorative umbrellas are prepared new by Thiruvambady and Paramekkavu Devawsoms separately. Paramekkavu Devaswom exhibits this at the Agrasala in Thrissur City, and the Thiruvambady Devaswom displays the caparisons at the Church Mission Society High School in Thrissur City on the fourth and fifth day before the Pooram. In 2014 and 2015, it was displayed in Kousthubham Hall at Shornur Road

== Main pooram ==
On pooram day, the participants from their temples parades with music and elephants decorated with thidambu and caparisons to Srimoolasthanam of Vadakkumnathan Temple twice – in the morning and at night. Pooram day officially starts with the arrival of Kanimangalam Sastha in the early morning.

| Temple | Morning Time | Evening Time | Elephants | Music |
|---|---|---|---|---|
| Kanimangalam | 7.30 am - 8.30 am | 7.30 pm - 8.30 pm | 9 | Panchavadyam, Pandi melam |
| Panekkammpilly | 8.30 am - 9.00 am | 8.30 pm - 9.30 pm | 3 | Panchavadyam, Panjari melam |
| Chempukkavu | 7.45 am - 8.45 am | 8.15 pm - 9.15 pm | 3 | Panchavadyam, Pandi melam |
| Karumukku - Pukkatikara | 8.30 am - 9.30 am | 9.00 pm - 10.00 pm | 9 | Panchavadyam, Pandi melam |
| Lalur | 9.00 am - 10.30 am | 9.30 pm - 10.30 pm | 9 | Panchavadyam, Pandi melam |
| Choorakkottukkavu | 9.30 am - 11.00 am | 10.00 pm - 12.00 am | 14 | Nadaswaram, Pandi melam |
| Ayyanthole | 10.00 am - 12.00 pm | 11.00 pm - 12.30 am | 13 | Panchavadyam, Pandi melam |
| Neythalakkavu | 11.00 am - 1.00 pm | 12.00 am - 1.00 am | 11 | Nadaswaram, Pandi melam |

The processions of the principal participants––Thiruvambady and Parammekavu––are the most awaited and major events of the pooram.

Thiruvambady arrives to Vadakkumnathan from Brahmaswam Madham (vedic institution), with a panchavadhyam concert called "Madathil varavu", with artists numbering uppto 40 members with instruments such as thimila, madhalam, trumpet, cymbal and edakka. Paramekkavu begins its procession with a pandi melam in front of its temple at around 11:30 a.m and gradually enters the Vadakkamnuthan temple by 1:30 p.m.

At 2:00 p.m, inside the Vadakkumnathan Temple starts the "Ilanjithara melam", one of the central attractions of the pooram, consisting of drum, trumpets, pipe and cymbal.

=== Kudamattam ===
During the Kudamattam ritual, thirty caparisoned elephants (15 each from the Paramekkavu Bagavathi Temple and Thiruvambadi Sri Krishna Temple) stood face-to-face in ceremonial formation. Atop these elephants, parasol bearers rhythmically switch between vividly colored ornamental silk umbrellas.

=== Display of fireworks (Main Round) ===
Thrissur pooram main fireworks (vedikettu / വെടിക്കെട്ട് ) are well renowned throughout the country. This display of fireworks is held in the heart of Thrissur city, in Thekkinkadu Maidan.

Thiruvambadi and Parmekavu are the main participants in this event. The main fireworks begin in the early morning of the seventh day. Most pooram enthusiasts stay up all night to get a better view of the fireworks. People come from faraway places to watch the display of pyrotechnics. There are four major firework displays in Thrissur Pooram: the 'sample fireworks' on the day before the Pooram, the colourful sparklers that light up the sky (amittu) by both sides on the Pooram evening after the Southward Descent, the most impressive event that mark the peak of Pooram celebrations in the early morning hours, and the final fireworks the following noon after the goddesses bid farewell to each other that mark the end of the pooram.

=== Farewell ceremony ===
The seventh day of the pooram is the last day. It is also known as "Pakal Pooram" (പകല് പൂരം). For the people of Thrissur, the pooram is not only a festival but also a time for hospitality. Upacharam Cholli Piriyal (ഉപചാരം ചൊല്ലി പിരിയല്‍) (farewell ceremony) is the last event held at Swaraj Round. Thiruvambadi Sri Krishna Temple and Paramekkavu Bagavathi Temple idols were taken from the Swaraj Round to their respective temples to mark the end of the Pooram celebrations. The festival ends with display of fireworks known as Pakal Vedikkettu.

== Security ==
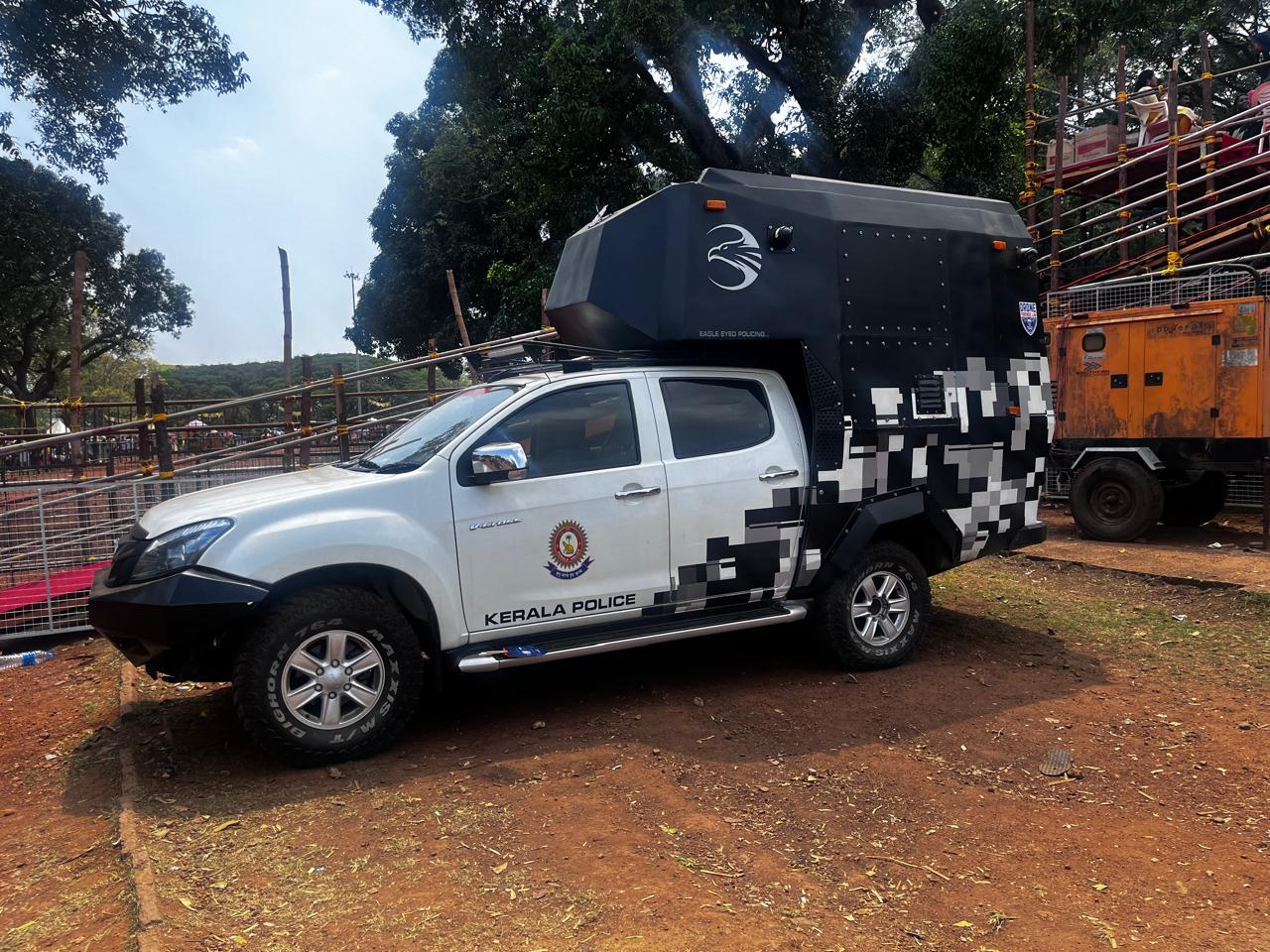
Kerala Police's anti-drone system in action during 2025 Thrissur Pooram.

For the 2025 Thrissur Pooram festival, a 4,000-member Thrissur City Police team was deployed. The deployment included not just local police but also specialised units such as the National Disaster Response Force (NDRF), Thunderbolt, and Urban Commandos. The number of closed-circuit television cameras installed throughout the city was increased from 250 to 350 to aid in monitoring and crime prevention.

Thrissur City Police deployed a dedicated cyber team to monitor and cleanse digital platforms of potentially inflammatory content in the run-up to the Thrissur Pooram festival. A 20-member unit comprising officers with digital expertise was tasked with identifying and removing communal or politically charged messages that could incite unrest. This marked the first time that Kerala Police initiated such a step specifically for Pooram-related online surveillance.

== Attendance ==
Thrissur District Collector Arjun Pandian has stated that an estimated 18 to 20 lakh people are expected to participate in the 2025 edition of Thrissur Pooram.

The Pooram celebration comprises over 50 elephants, each decorated with nettipattam (golden headgear), bells, jewelry, and kolam patterns.

== Cultural influences ==
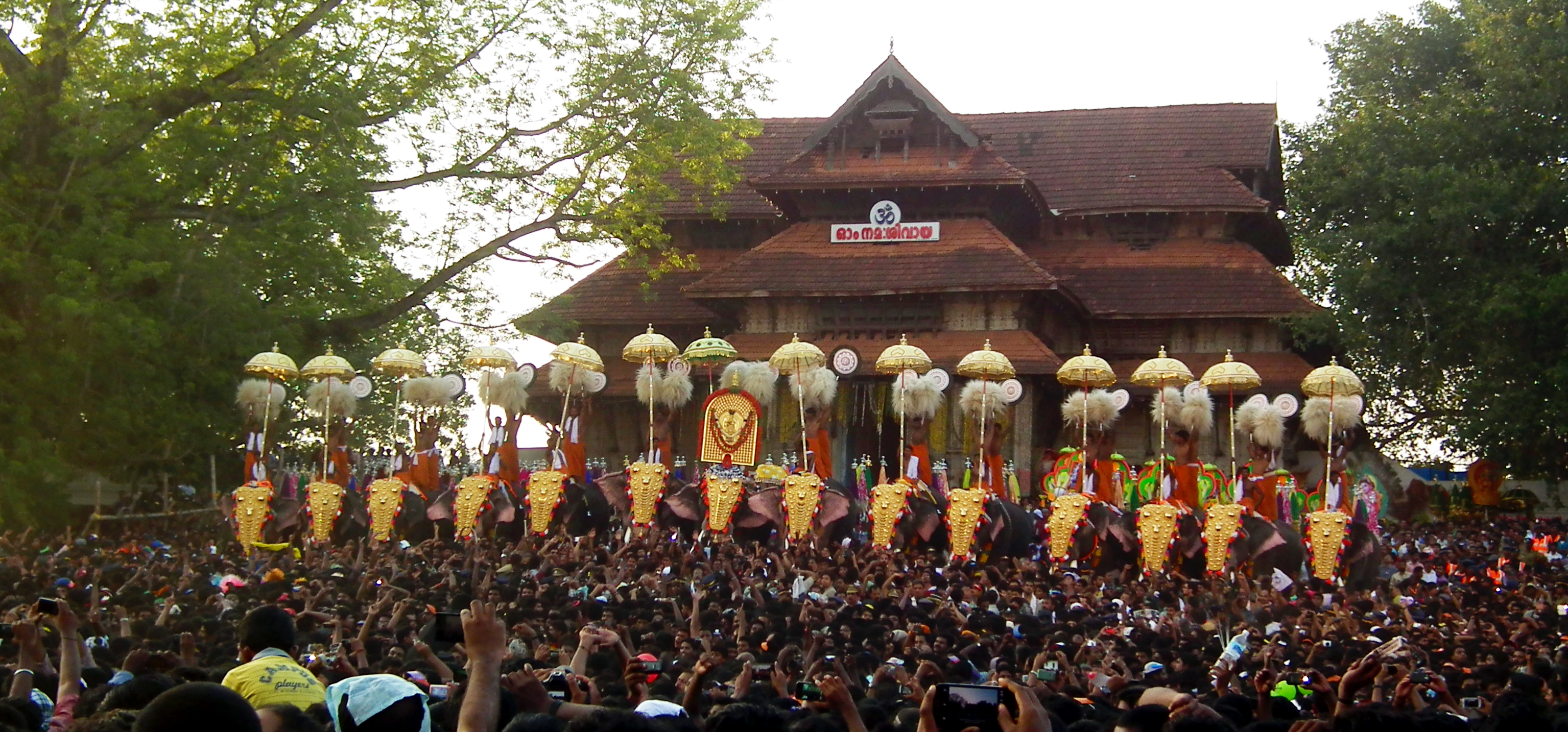
Kudamatom at Thrissur Pooram 2013

Despite being a Hindu festival, the Thrissur Pooram is attended by different sections of Kerala society. Several replicas of the festival are held in places in Kerala as well as outside the state.

Thrissur Pooram is considered one of the greatest gatherings in Asia. It has an important place in the tourism map of India, as tourists enjoy the beauty and traditions of this pooram. Rail and bus connectivity is excellent in Thrissur, which attracts many foreign tourists to the gala. It is considered as meeting of Devas (ദേവ സംഗമം).

The Oscar-winning sound editor Resul Pookutty and his team recorded the sounds of the 36-hour festivities and made a movie The Sound Story.
