= Choorakkottukavu Bhagavathy Temple =

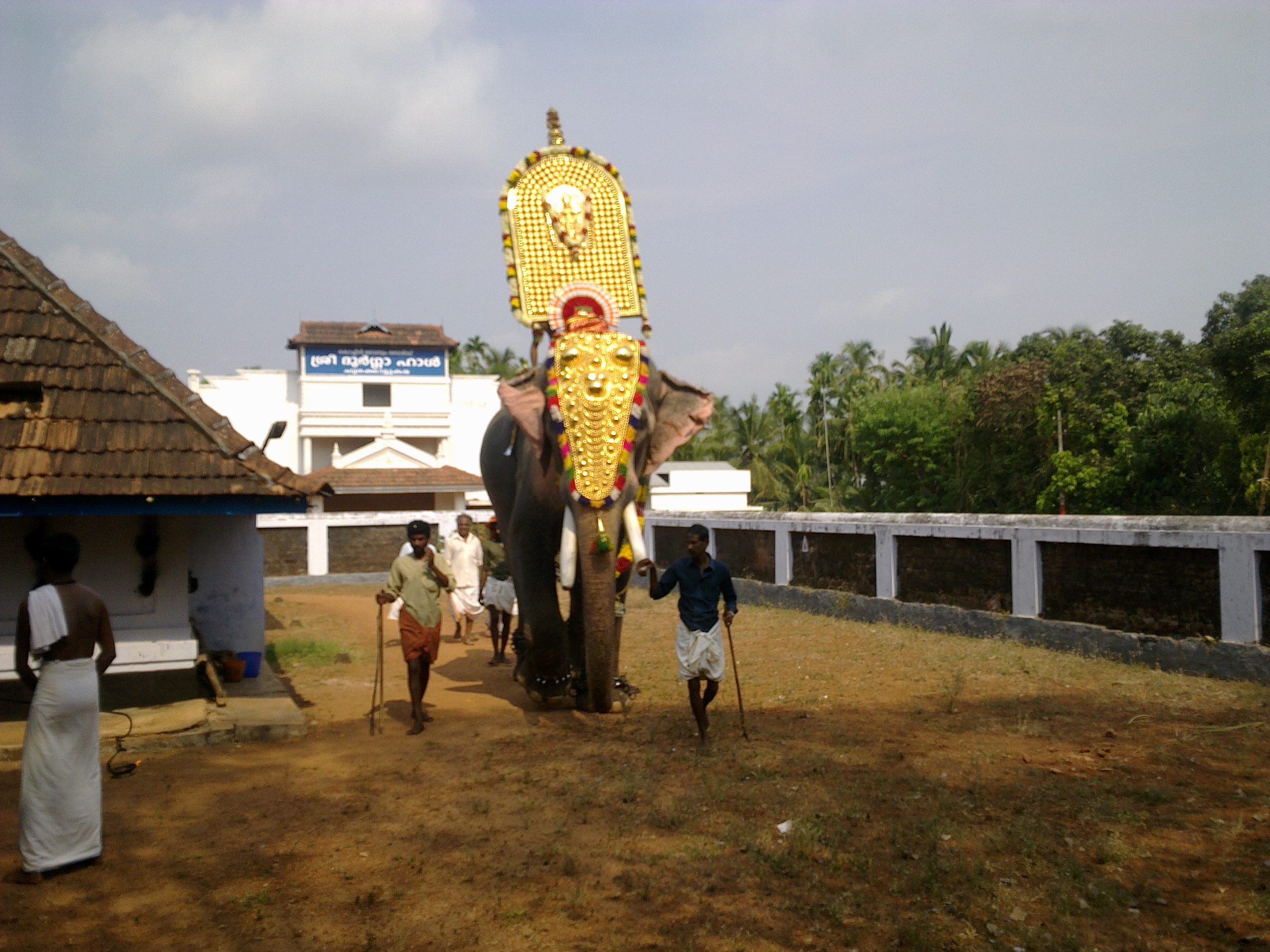

Religion
- Affiliation: Hinduism
- District: Thrissur District
- Festivals: Thrissur Pooram, Karthika Vilakku

Location
- Location: City of Thrissur
- State: Kerala
- Country: India
- Interactive map of Choorakkottukavu Bhagavathy Temple
- Coordinates: 10.559567°N 76.177383°E

Architecture
- Type: Kerala

Choorakkottukavu Bhagavathy Temple is a Hindu temple situated in Thrissur City of Kerala, India. The temple is a participant in the Thrissur Pooram every year.

The presiding deity is goddess Durga as mahishasurmardhini. The goddess proceeds to Vadakkumnathan temple starting with one elephants and nadaswaram. After reaching naduvilal number of elephants become 14 and is followed by Pandi Melam

== Gallery ==
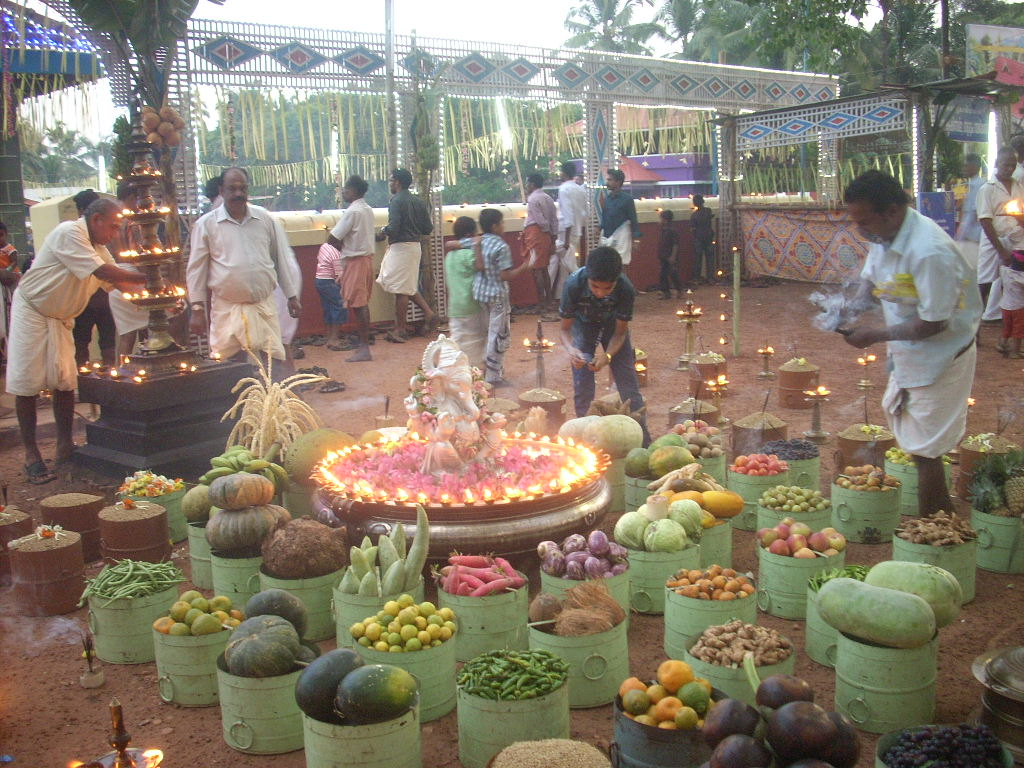
Karthika Vilakku

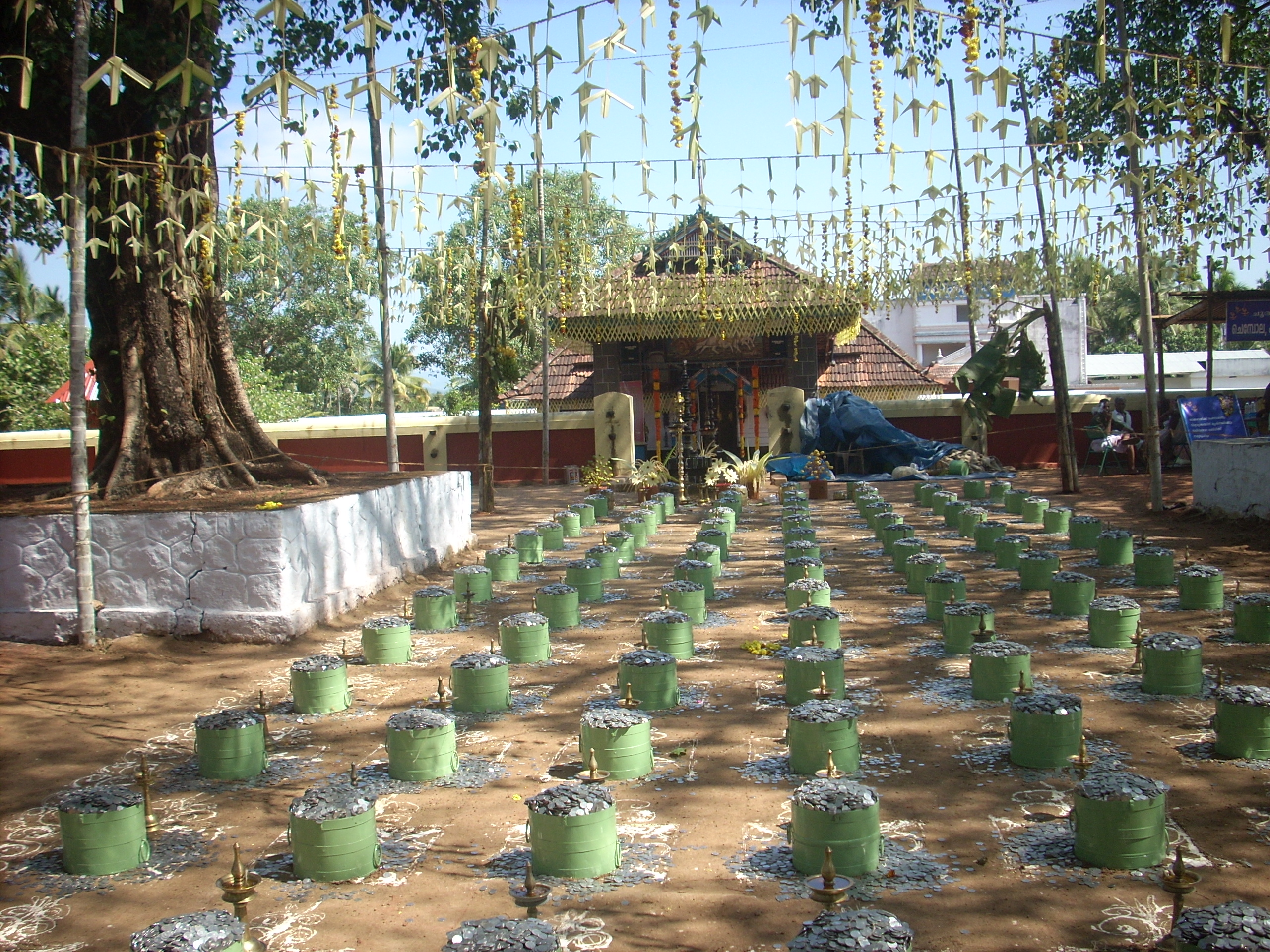
Nanayappara

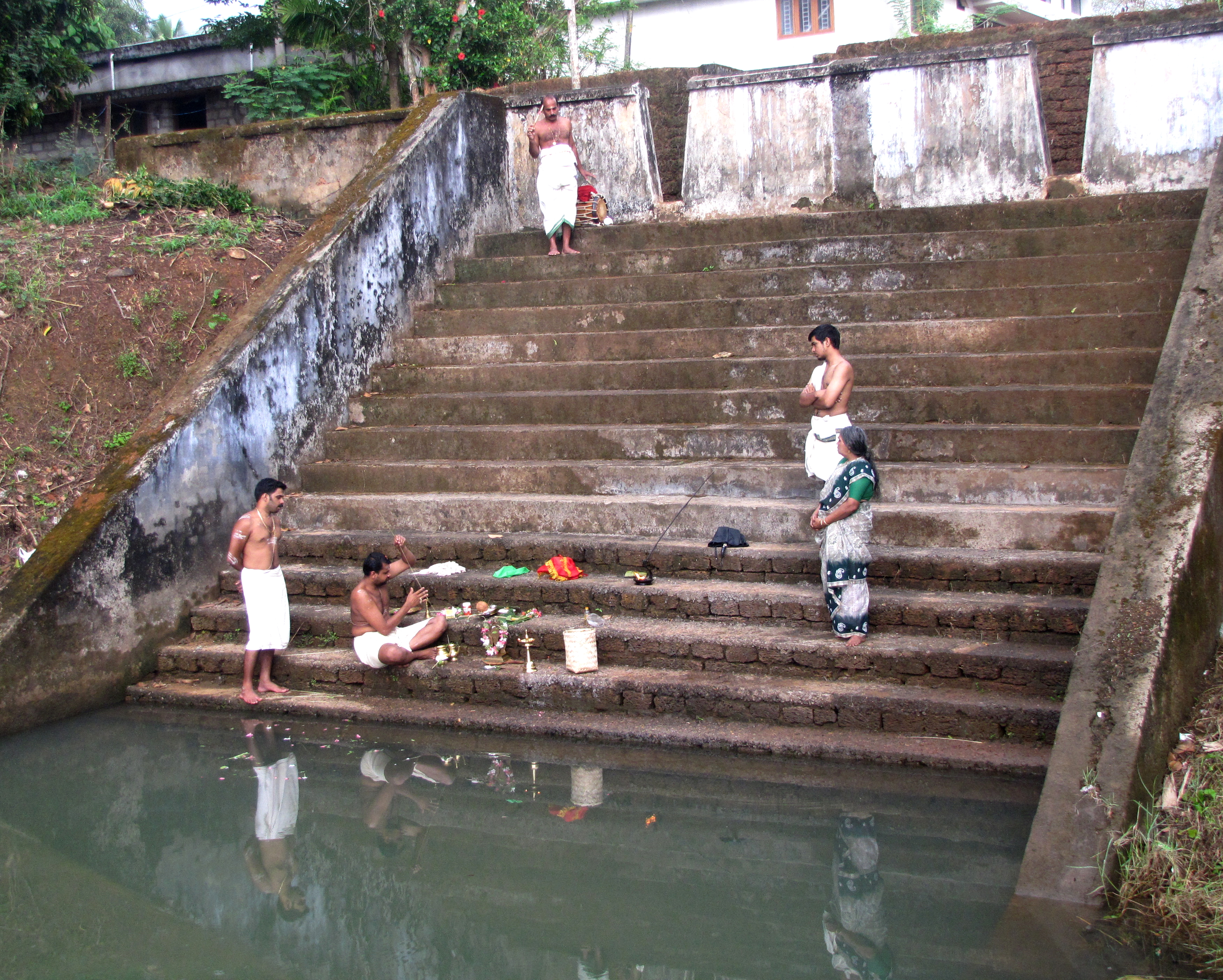
Kshethra Kulam, Arattu

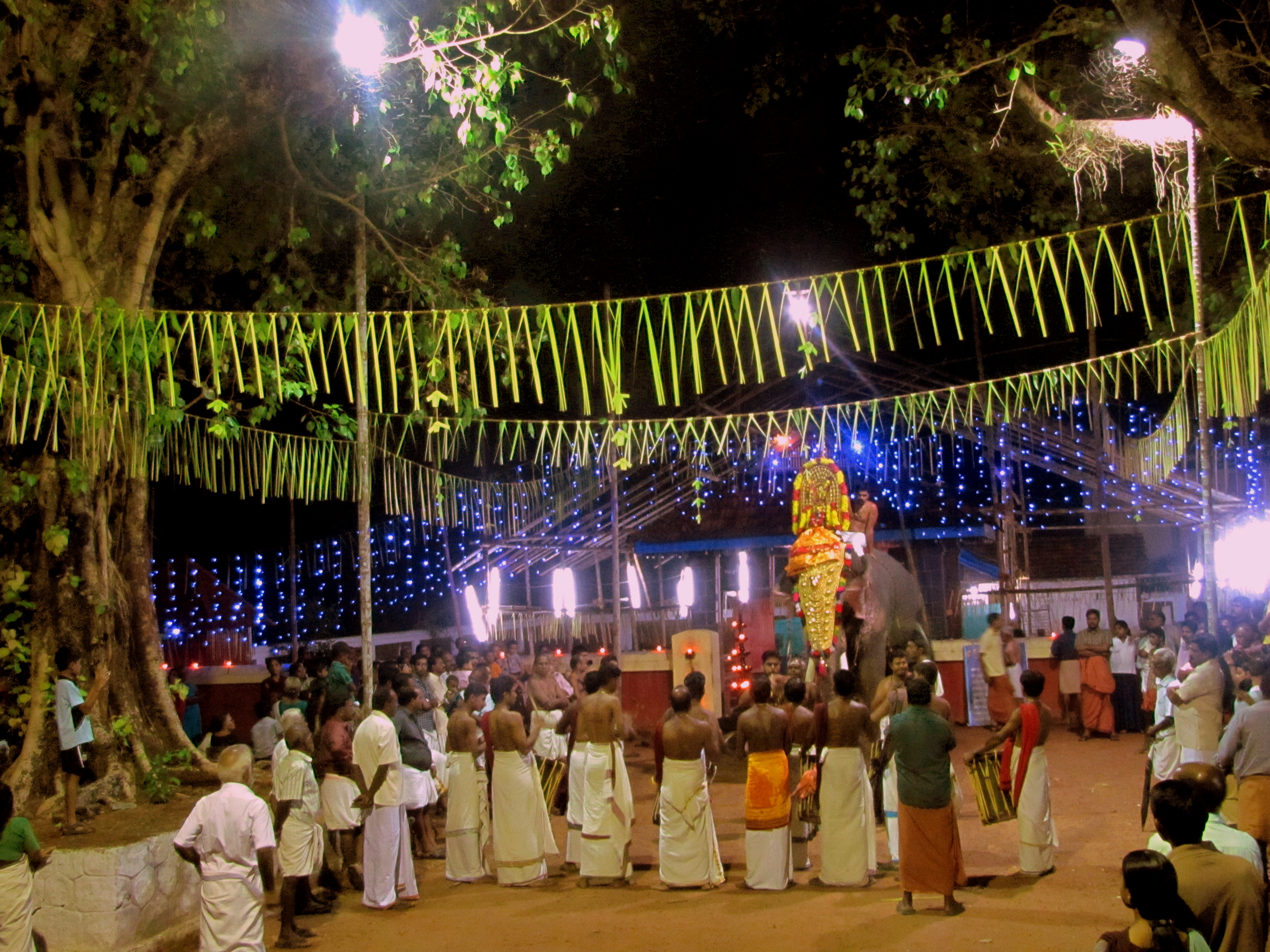
Pooram kodiyeettam, Meelam (2012)

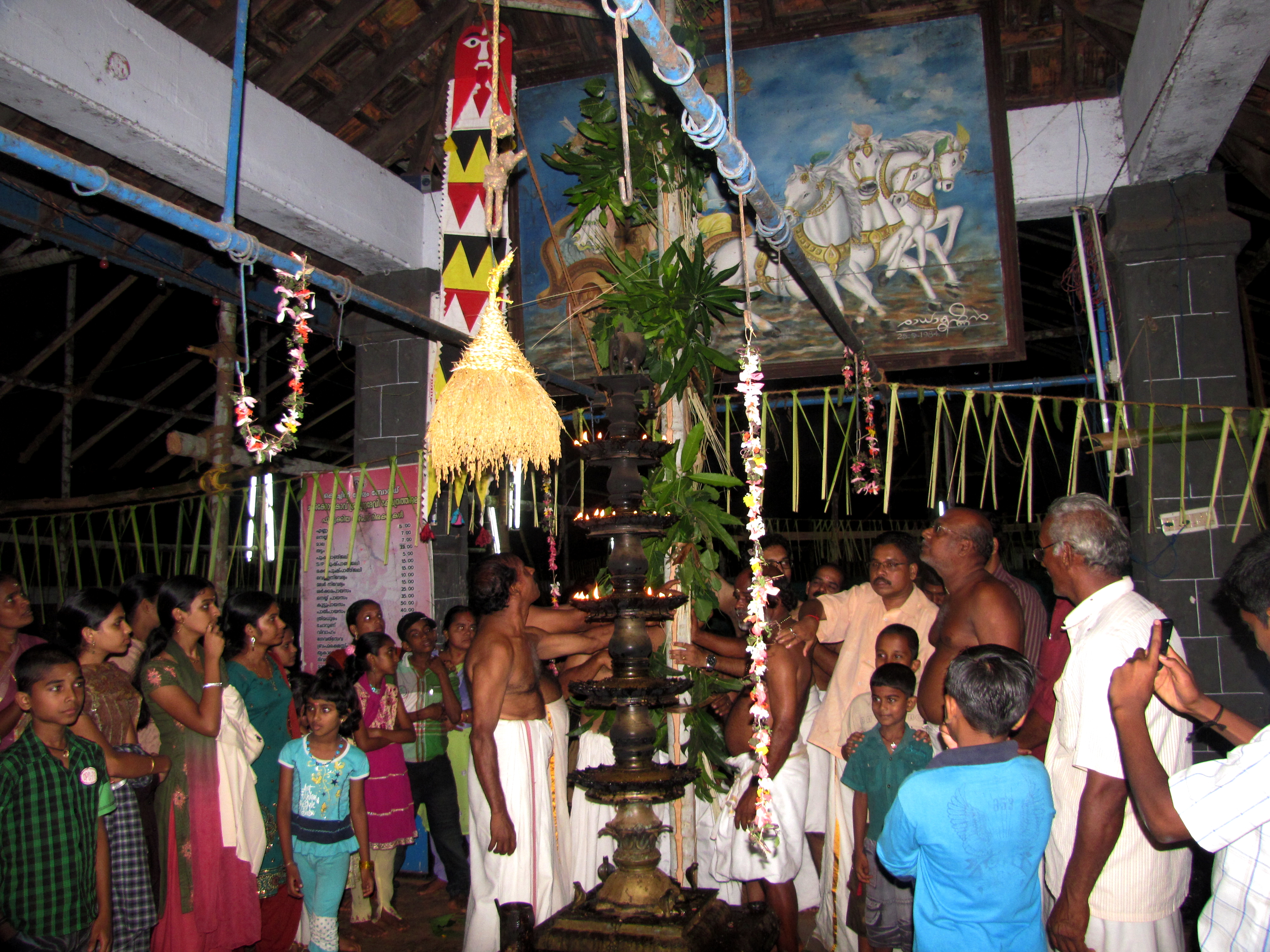
Pooram Kodiyeettam

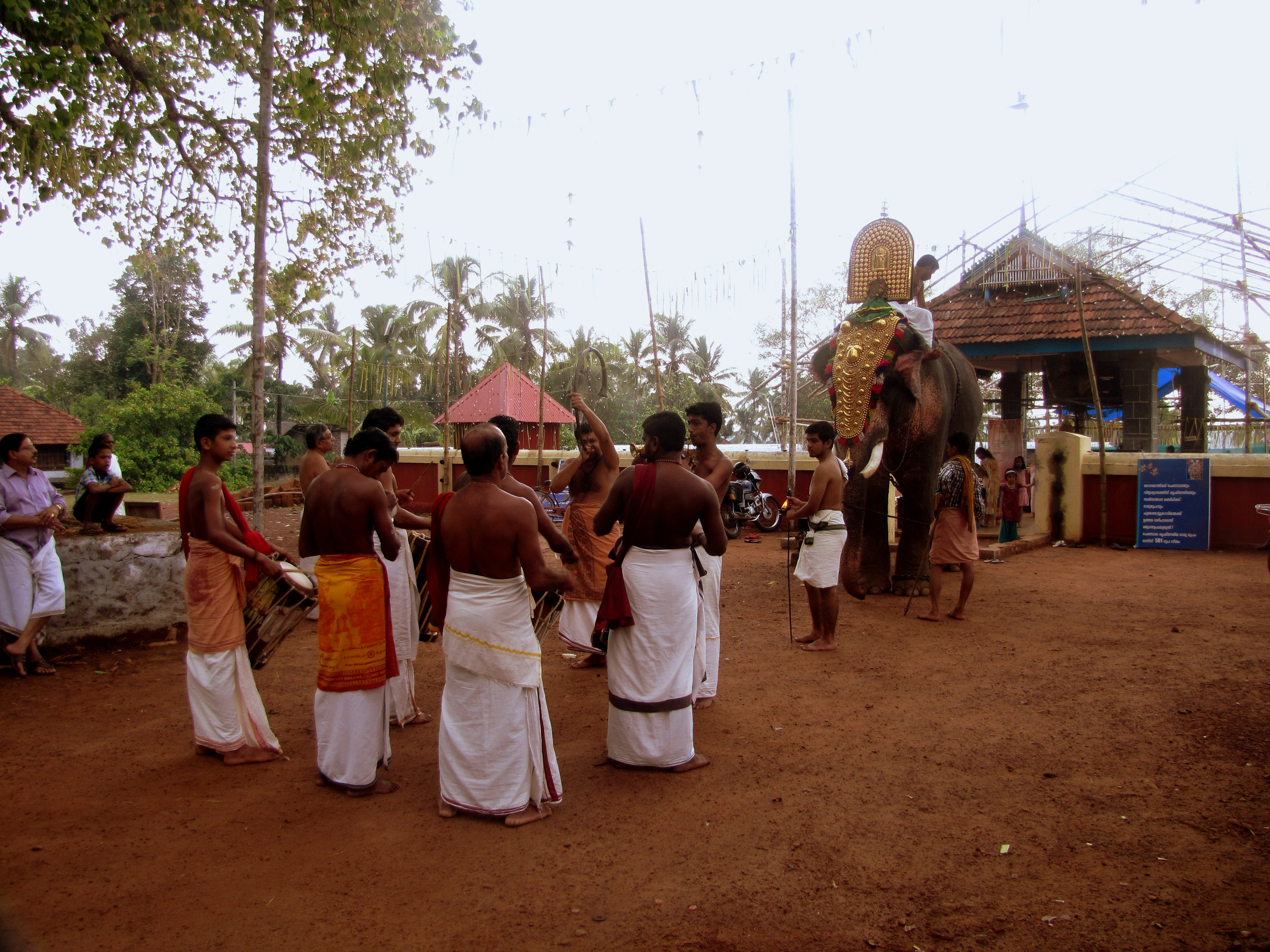
Morning Meelam

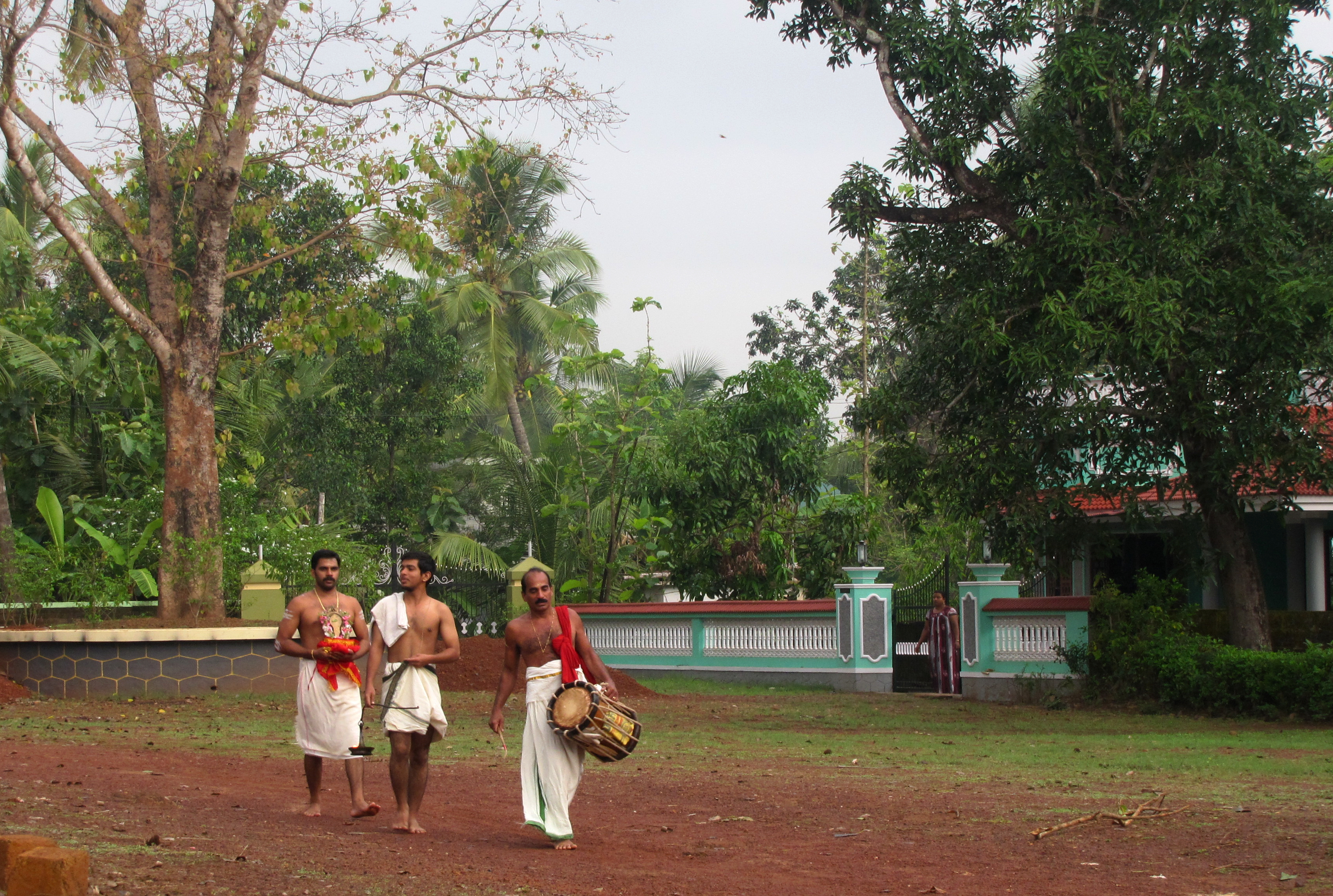

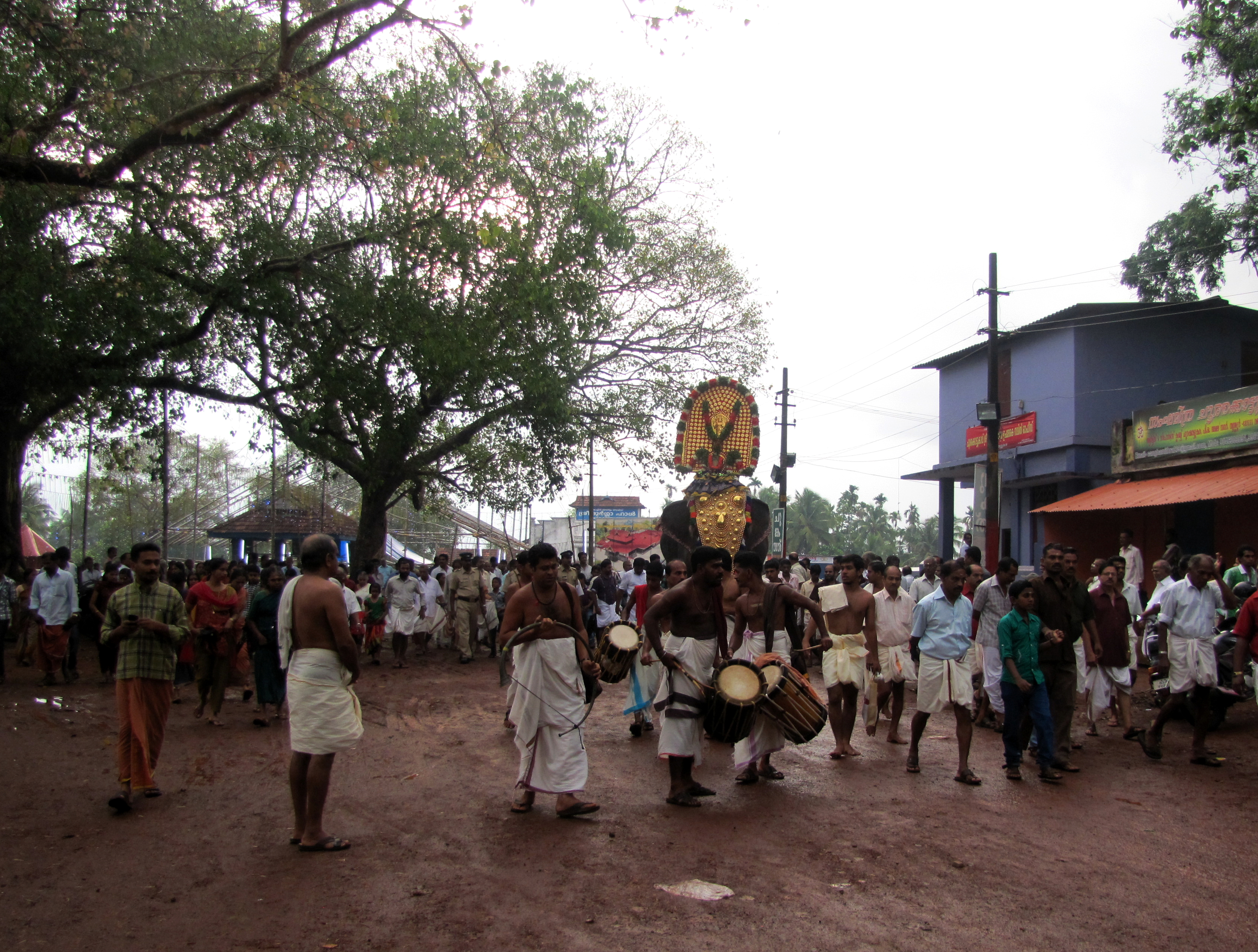
Pooram Purappadu

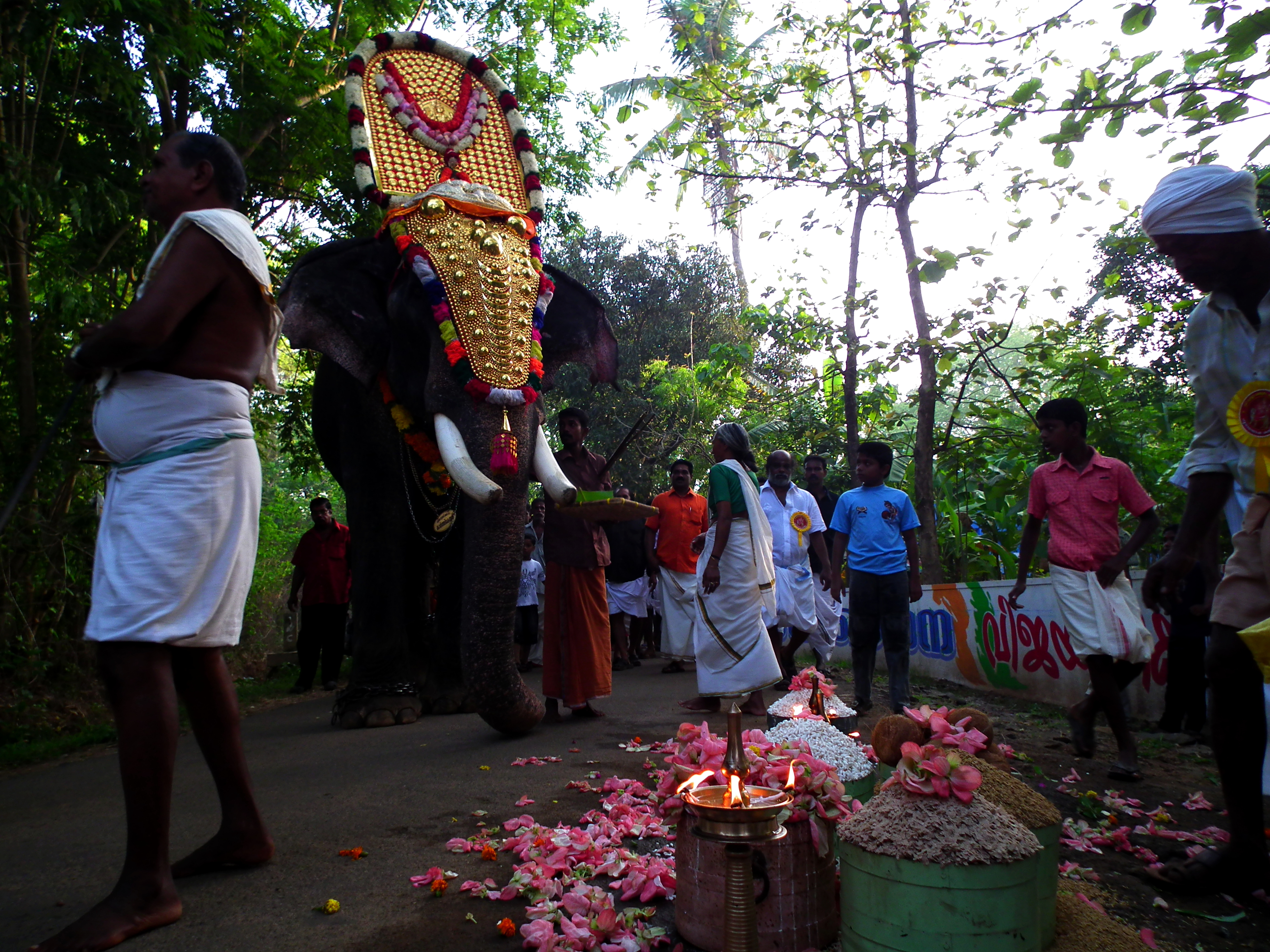
Parayeduppu

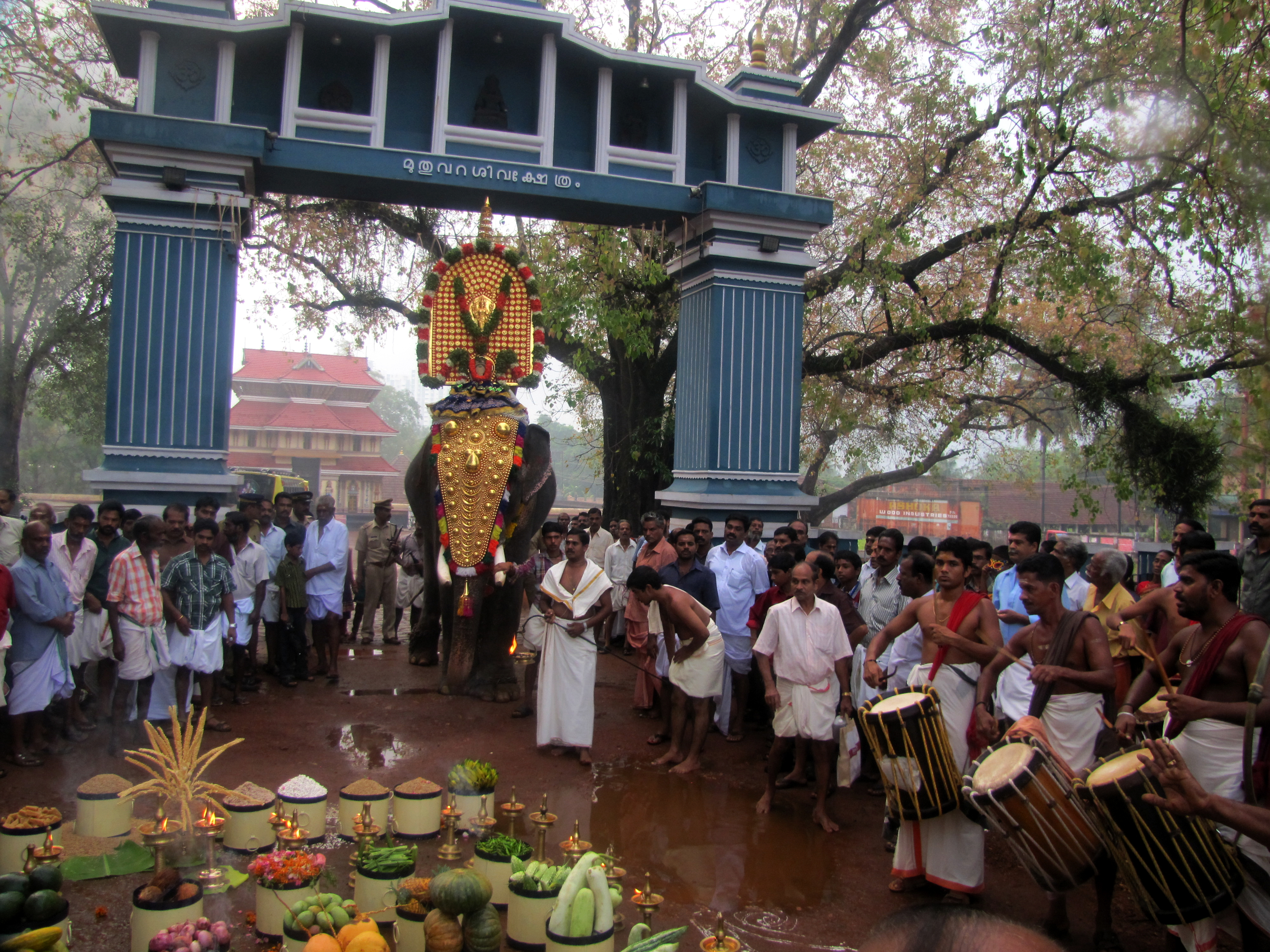

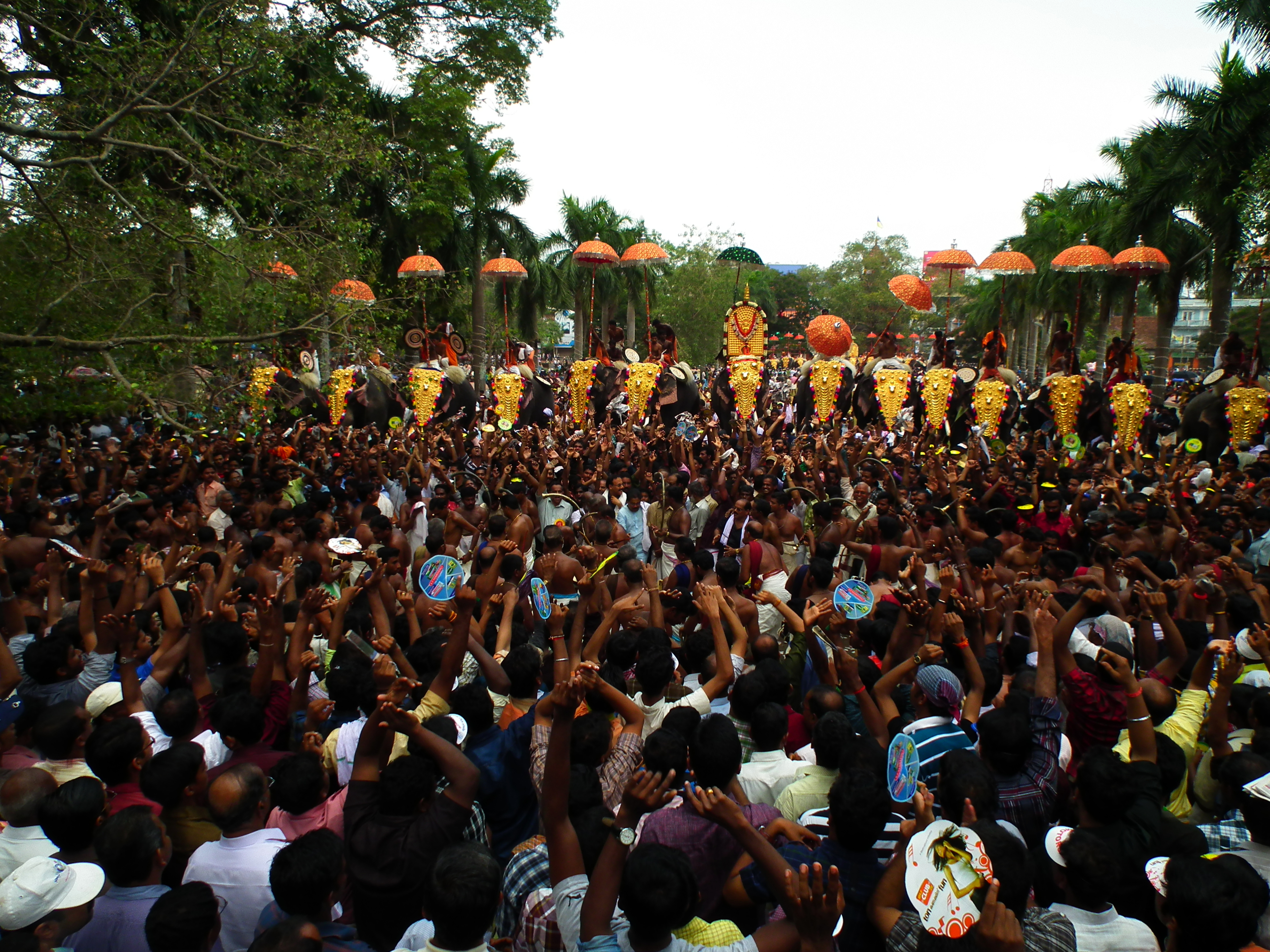
at Padinjare Nada, Thrissur Pooram
