= Thekkinkadu Maidan =

Square

Thekkinkadu Maidanam
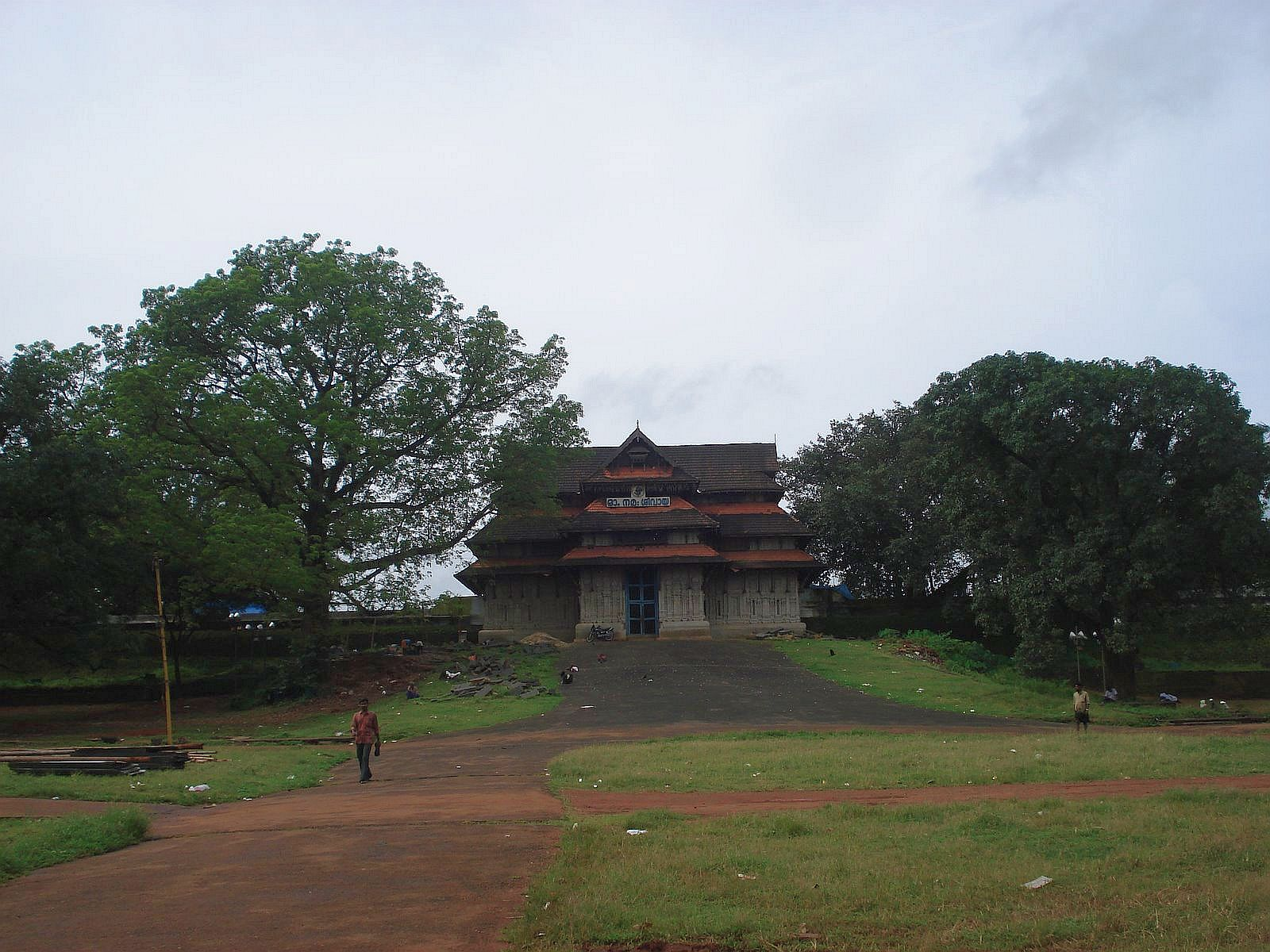
- Vadakkumnathan Temple at the heart of Thekkinkadu Maidanam
- Interactive map of Thekkinkadu Maidanam
- Type: Public ground
- Location: Thrissur, Kerala, India
- Coordinates: 10.5249°N 76.2144°E
- Area: 65 acres (26 ha)
- Created: Rama Varma Sakthan Thampuran
- Operator: Cochin Devaswom Board
- Open: All year
- Status: Open all year

Thekkinkadu Maidanam is a historic open ground located in the center of Thrissur city in the Kerala state of India. The 65-acre area surrounds the ancient Vadakkunnathan Temple, one of the most significant Shiva temples in Kerala, and is a vital cultural and historical landmark. The maidan is under the management of the Cochin Devaswom Board and plays host to a variety of public events, including the famous Thrissur Pooram, one of the largest temple festivals in Kerala, often referred to as the "Mother of all Poorams." Historically a dense forest cleared during the reign of Rama Varma Sakthan Thampuran, the maidan is encircled by the Swaraj Round and serves as a venue for political rallies, public gatherings, and daily activities.

== History ==
Historically, Thekkinkadu Maidanam was a dense forest where wild animals roamed freely, and it was used to execute criminals in ancient times. Criminals were driven into the thick forest from the gates of the Vadakkunnathan Temple.

During the reign of Rama Varma Sakthan Thampuran, the Maharaja of Cochin, the forest was cleared, despite opposition from Brahmin priests and orthodox sections of society. The Maharaja's vision transformed it into an open space, making it a center for gatherings and festivals.

In 1928, the maidan was transferred to the Thrissur Municipality by the then Sanitary Board, which previously maintained it. However, in 1934, Diwan Paruvakad Narayanan Nair transferred the maidan to the Cochin Devaswom Board, on the condition that it remains open for public use for festivals and gatherings.

== Structure ==
The maidan is a circular ground, encircled by the Swaraj Round, which is the main ring road of Thrissur city. The area is home to many significant structures such as the Vadakkunnathan Temple, the Nehru Park, the Kerala Water Authority office, water storage tanks, and several wells. The layout of the city of Thrissur branches out radially from this central point, creating a unique and organized urban structure.

== Cultural Significance ==
Thekkinkadu Maidanam is deeply tied to the culture of Kerala, particularly Thrissur. It is best known for hosting the annual Thrissur Pooram, which attracts thousands of visitors. The maidan serves as the venue for the Pooram, with its spectacular display of elephants, fireworks, and traditional percussion performances.

Aside from Thrissur Pooram, the maidan also hosts various political rallies, public meetings, and cultural events. Leaders such as Jawaharlal Nehru, Indira Gandhi, Atal Bihari Vajpayee, and Narendra Modi have addressed gatherings here. The maidan is also a popular spot for chess and card games in the evenings, political debates, and casual gatherings.

== Prime Ministers of India who visited Thekkinkadu Maidan ==
- Jawaharlal Nehru
- Indira Gandhi
- Rajiv Gandhi
- P V Narasimha Rao
- Atal Bihari Vajpayee
- Manmohan Singh
- Narendra Modi

== Modern Developments and Events ==
In recent years, Thekkinkadu Maidanam has seen several development projects aimed at preserving its cultural significance and improving its infrastructure. In 2005, Rs. 6 crore was allocated for the beautification of the maidan.

The venue regularly hosts large-scale public events such as the Thrissur Motor Show, which is organized by the students of Government Engineering College, Thrissur.

=== Disha 2024 ===
In October 2024, the Kerala government organized the *Disha* career guidance event at Thekkinkadu Maidanam from October 4 to 8. The event, traditionally an orientation program for higher secondary students, was expanded into a full-scale education expo. It featured over 80 educational institutions, including state and central universities. The expo provided guidance on career options, entrance exams, and applications to higher education institutions. Students also had the opportunity to take the Kerala Differential Aptitude Test (K-DAT). The event was aimed at addressing the increasing trend of students seeking higher education opportunities abroad.

== Activities ==
Apart from hosting large festivals and events, Thekkinkadu Maidanam is a hub for daily activities. In the evenings, it becomes a gathering spot for local residents engaging in games like chess and cards. The maidan also serves as a platform for political debates, with areas like 'Students Corner', 'Labour Corner', and the 'Nehru Mandapam' being key spots for speeches and debates. Notable figures, including Mahatma Gandhi, C. Achutha Menon, and E. M. S. Namboodiripad, have delivered speeches here.

The 'Nehru Mandapam' was named after Jawaharlal Nehru when he visited Thrissur in 1952 and addressed the public at the maidan. Other leaders like Atal Bihari Vajpayee and Narendra Modi have also spoken here.

== Gallery ==
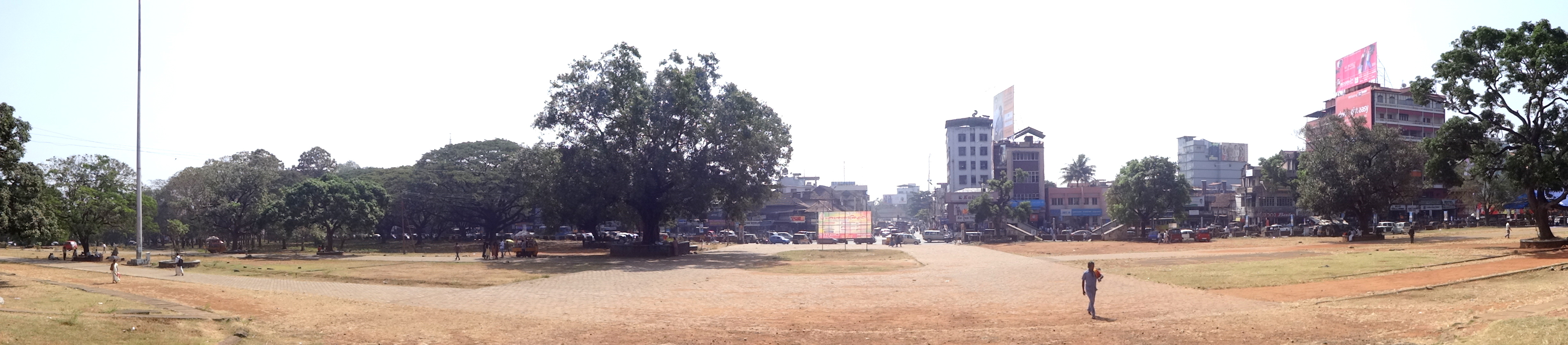
A view of Municipal Office Road from Thekkinkadu Maidanam

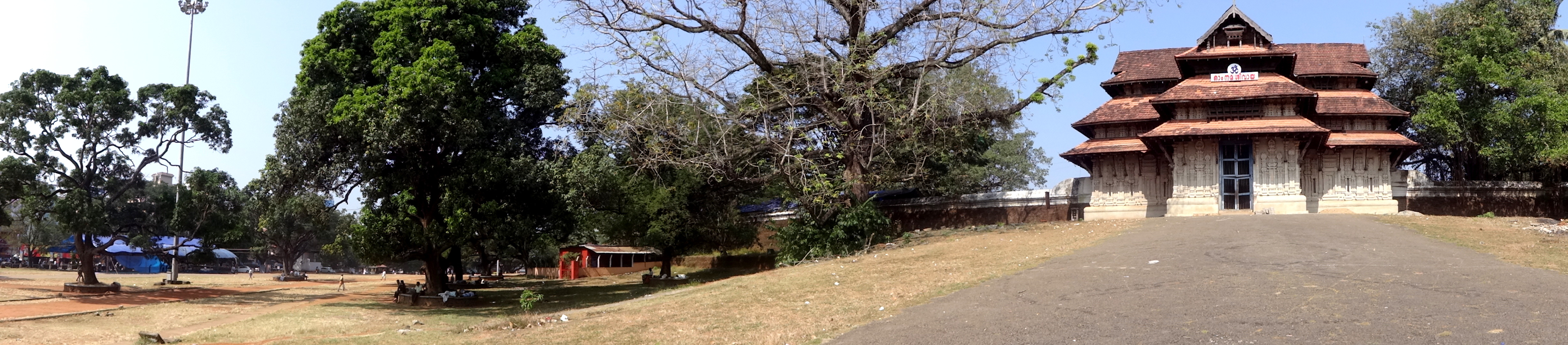
A view of Vadakkunnathan Temple from Thekkinkadu Maidanam
