= Thrissur Motor Show =

- Status: Active
- Genre: Auto show
- Frequency: Annual
- Venue: Shakthan Maithan
- Country: India
- Years active: 2000-present
- Attendance: Around 50,000
- Organiser: Department of Mechanical Engineering, Government Engineering College, Thrissur
- Website: www.thrissurmotorshow.com//

The Thrissur Motor Show is South India’s largest student organized motor show held annually in Thrissur city, Kerala, India. The show is an exhibition of luxury, vintage and modified cars and motor bikes . The expo is organized at Thekkinkadu Maidan and organized by Mechanical Engineering Department of Government Engineering College, Thrissur.

== Government Engineering College Thrissur ==
Government Engineering College Thrissur is an engineering college situated in Thrissur city of Kerala, India. It is the second oldest engineering college established in Kerala and the first engineering college to be established after the formation of Kerala state. The college is affiliated to the APJ Abdul Kalam Technological University.

== Milestones ==
Year	Highlight
2000	First ever student organised Motor Show in South India
2001	Parade of DC Designs fleet
2002	Largest show in Kerala
2003	Largest vintage car collection
2005	Stunt performance by national dirt bike champion Jinan C.D.
2008	The Hindu's "best student organised show." Inauguration by Narain Karthikeyan
2012	First public exhibition of Rolls-Royce in Kerala
2013	A trio of Ferrari 458 Italia, Audi R8 and Maserati Gran Turismo as main attraction
2014	Porsche Panamera 2015 first public appearance in Kerala; KTM Duke 390 launch in Thrissur
2017	Public exhibition of Formula Racecar. Interaction with Formula four racer Mira Erda who is the first Indian woman to enter Euro JK series
2019	Lamborghini Huracán, Chevrolet Biscayne. Interaction with various automobile influencers like Arun Smoki and Venom, Bike and car rallies
2022	High-profile exhibits including Boby Chemmanur’s gold-wrapped Rolls-Royce Phantom, the iconic Mazda Miata, and a Lamborghini Huracán, alongside professional bike stunts and the department's signature "Engine Mortuary."
