= Thiruvambadi Sivasundar =

Temple elephant in Kerala, India

Thiruvambadi Sivasundar (Pookodan Shivan)
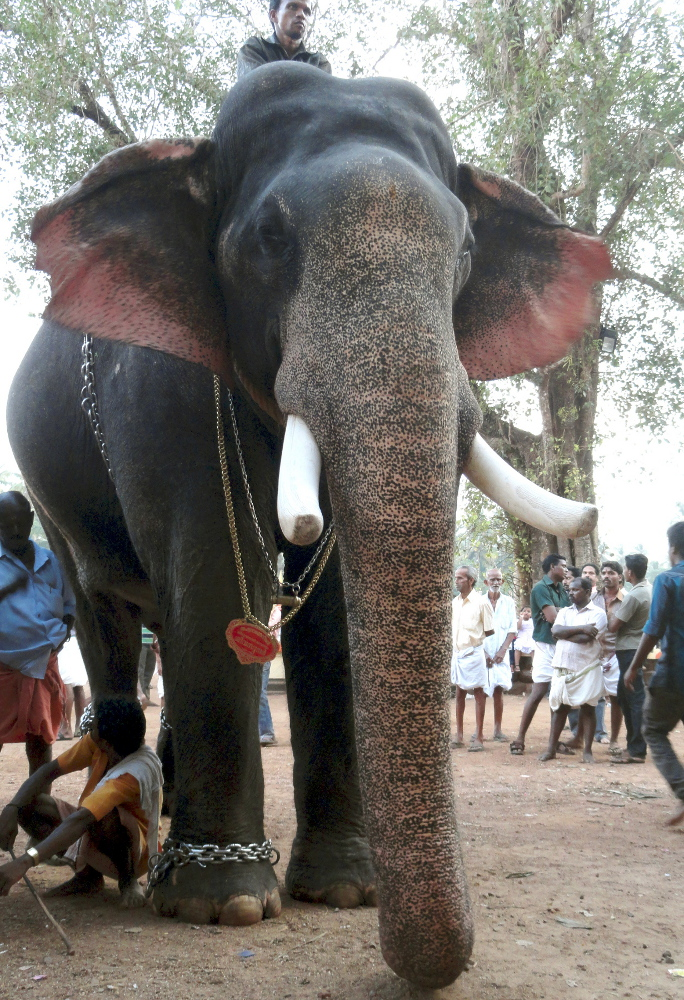
- Thiruvambadi Sivasundar in 2012
- Species: Indian elephant
- Sex: Male
- Born: c. 1972, Kodanadu Forest Range.
- Died: 11 March 2018; Thrissur, Kerala, India
- Nationality: India
- Employer: Thiruvambadi Sri Krishna Temple
- Successor: Thiruvambadi Cheriya Chandrasekharan
- Height: 3.06 m (10 ft 0 in)

Thiruvambadi Sivasundar (c. 1964 – 11 March 2018) was an Indian elephant who lived at the Thiruvambadi Sri Krishna Temple in Thrissur, Kerala, India.

== Career ==
He was first named Pookkodan Sivan and once worked at a timber factory. In 2003, he was purchased by businessman Sundar Menon for ₹28 lakh. Menon then gave him as an offering to the deity at the Thiruvambadi Sri Krishna Temple. From then on, he carried the idol on behalf of the temple during Thrissur's annual Pooram festival.

== Death ==
He died at 1:30 am, on 11 March 2018. He was experiencing constipation and losing weight for the last 67 days of his life, during which time he was receiving treatment.

Thousands of people attended his funeral. It was then taken to Malayattoor in Kerala where he was cremated and his ashes buried.

== See also ==
- List of individual elephants
