= Panamukkumpally Sastha Temple =

Panamukkumpally sree Sastha Temple

Religion
- Affiliation: Hinduism
- District: Thrissur District
- Festival: Thrissur Pooram

Location
- Location: City of Thrissur
- State: Kerala
- Country: India
- Interactive map of Panamukkumpally sree Sastha Temple

Architecture
- Type: Kerala

Panamukkumpally sree Sastha Temple is a Hindu temple situated in Thrissur City of Kerala, India. Lord Ayyappan is the main deity of the temple. The temple is a participant in the Thrissur Pooram every year.
