= Thiruvambadi Sri Krishna Temple =

Hindu temple in Kerala, India

- തിരുവമ്പാടി ക്ഷേത്രം
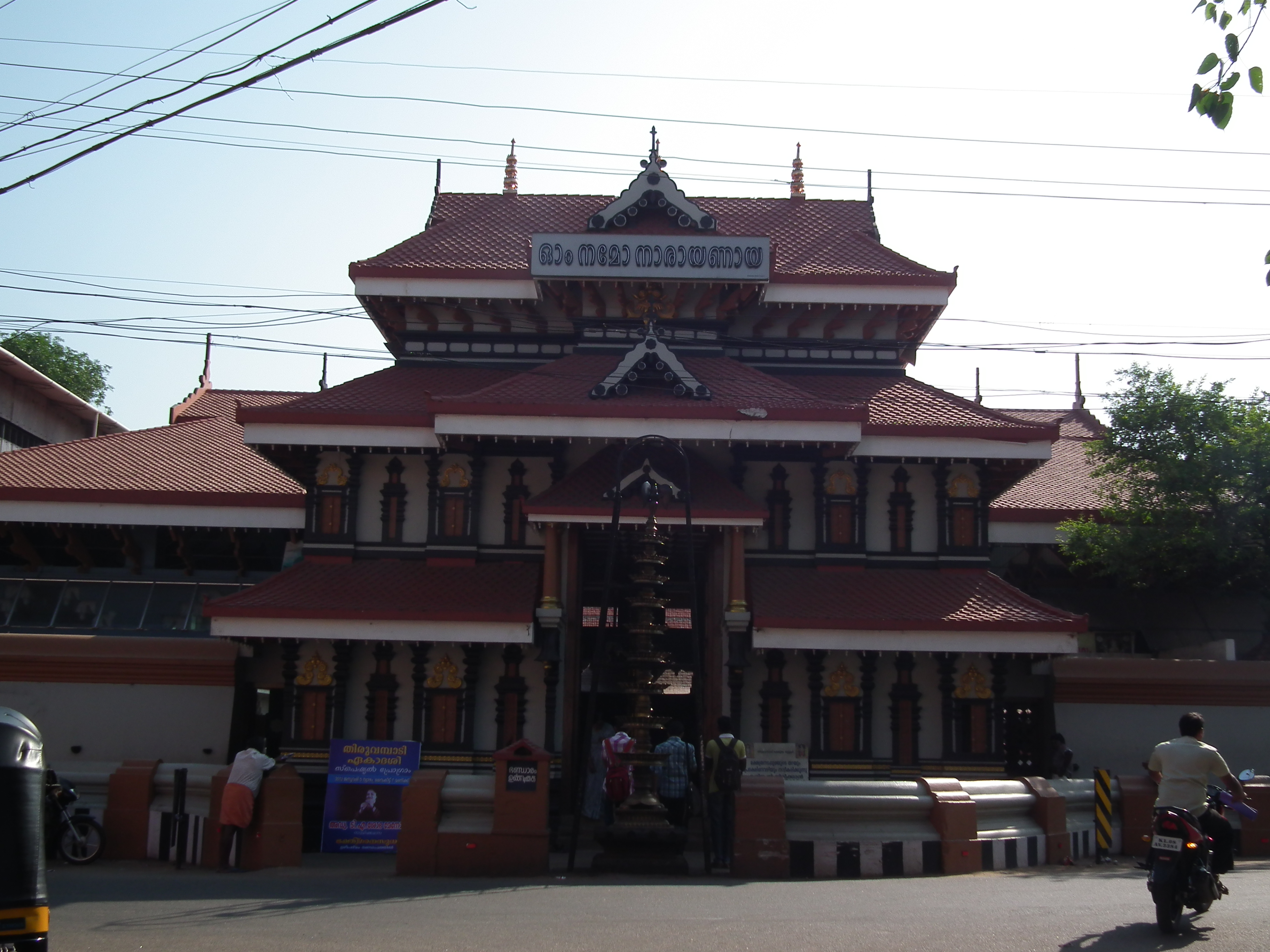

- Thiruvambadi Sree Krishna Temple, Thrissur, Kerala

Religion
- Affiliation: Hinduism
- District: Thrissur
- Deity: Krishna. Bhadrakali
- Festival: Thrissur Pooram

Location
- Location: City of Thrissur
- State: Kerala
- Country: India
- Coordinates: 10.5334°N 76.2116°E

Architecture
- Type: Architecture of Kerala

Specifications
- Temple: One
- Elevation: 32.36 m (106 ft)

Thiruvambadi Sri Krishna Temple is a Hindu temple in the city of Thrissur in Kerala, India. The main deities of this temple are Krishna in the form of a child, and Bhadrakali, both having equal importance. There are sub-shrines for Ganesha, Sastha and Brahmarakshasa, and there is a sub-temple for Ganesha behind the temple. The temple is one of the two groups participating in the Thrissur Pooram, an annual Hindu temple festival.

Thiruvambadi bagavathi is one of main participants of Thrissur Pooram. The goddess is considered as younger sister of Paramekkavu bagavathi (presiding deity of Paramekkavu temple)

One of main events in Thrissur Pooram is "madathilvarav". The goddess and lord krishna arrives to Brahmaswom madom on day of Thrissur pooram.After erakkipooja, the procession leds to Vadakkumnathan temple and is accompanied by panchavadyam

The temple was home to an elephant named Thiruvambadi Sivasundar who died on 2018

== See also ==
- Temples of Kerala
- Paramekkavu Bagavathi Temple
- Thiruvambady in Kozhikode
- Thiruvambadi Sivasundar
- Thiruvambadi Chandrasekharan
- Thiruvambadi Cheriya Chandrasekharan
