= Swaraj Round, Thrissur =

Swaraj Round
- CBD
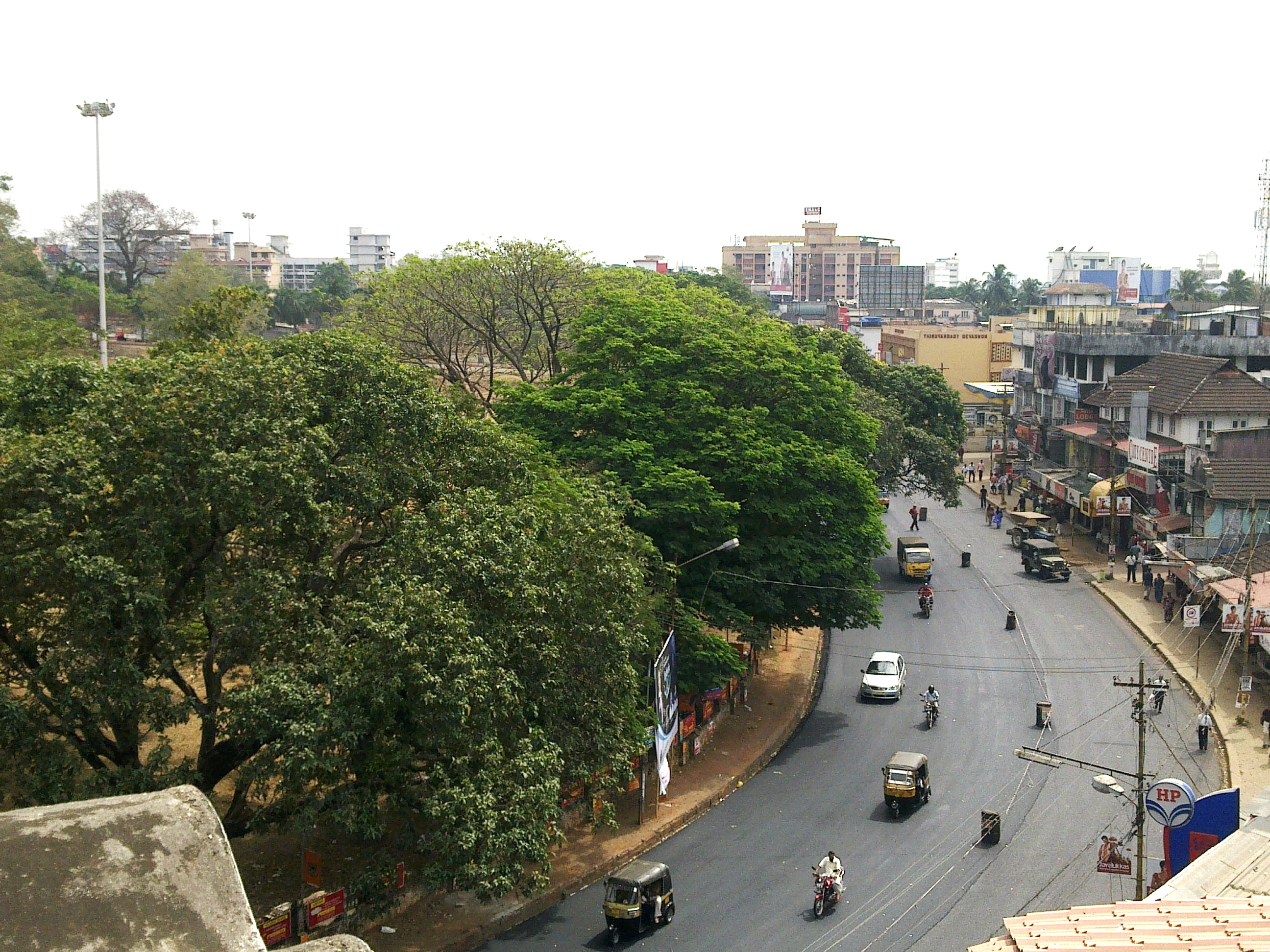
- A bird's eye view of Swaraj Round

- Location in Kerala, India
- Coordinates: 10.527573°N 76.21447°E
- Country: India
- District: Thrissur

Government
  - Body: Thrissur Municipal Corporation

Languages
- Time zone: UTC+5:30 (IST)
- Telephone code: 0487
- Vehicle registration: KL-08
- Nearest city: City of Thrissur
- Civic agency: Thrissur Municipal Corporation

Swaraj Round or Thrissur Round is the local name for a circular road which is about 2 km long in the centre of the city of Thrissur in Kerala, India, surrounding the 65-acre (260,000 m^{2}) hillock called the Thekkinkadu Maidan which seats the Vadakkumnathan Temple. Swaraj Round is one of the biggest Roundabout in South Asia. It is a financial, commercial and business center in Kerala and is connected by seventeen roads. Encircling the Thekkinkadu Maidan, Swaraj Round surrounds the small hillock on which the Vadakkunnathan Temple dedicated to Shiva is built. It is the largest circular road surrounding a ground in India and one of the largest roundabout in the world.

Swaraj Round is a commercial and shopping area of Thrissur with malls, shopping centers, and jewelry and textile shops. There are two pedestrian subways in the Swaraj Round, one near Paramekkavu temple and other at M.O. Road Junction. It of the Republic parade and the Pulikali on the fourth Onam day, when Pulikali troupes from different parts of the district perform there.

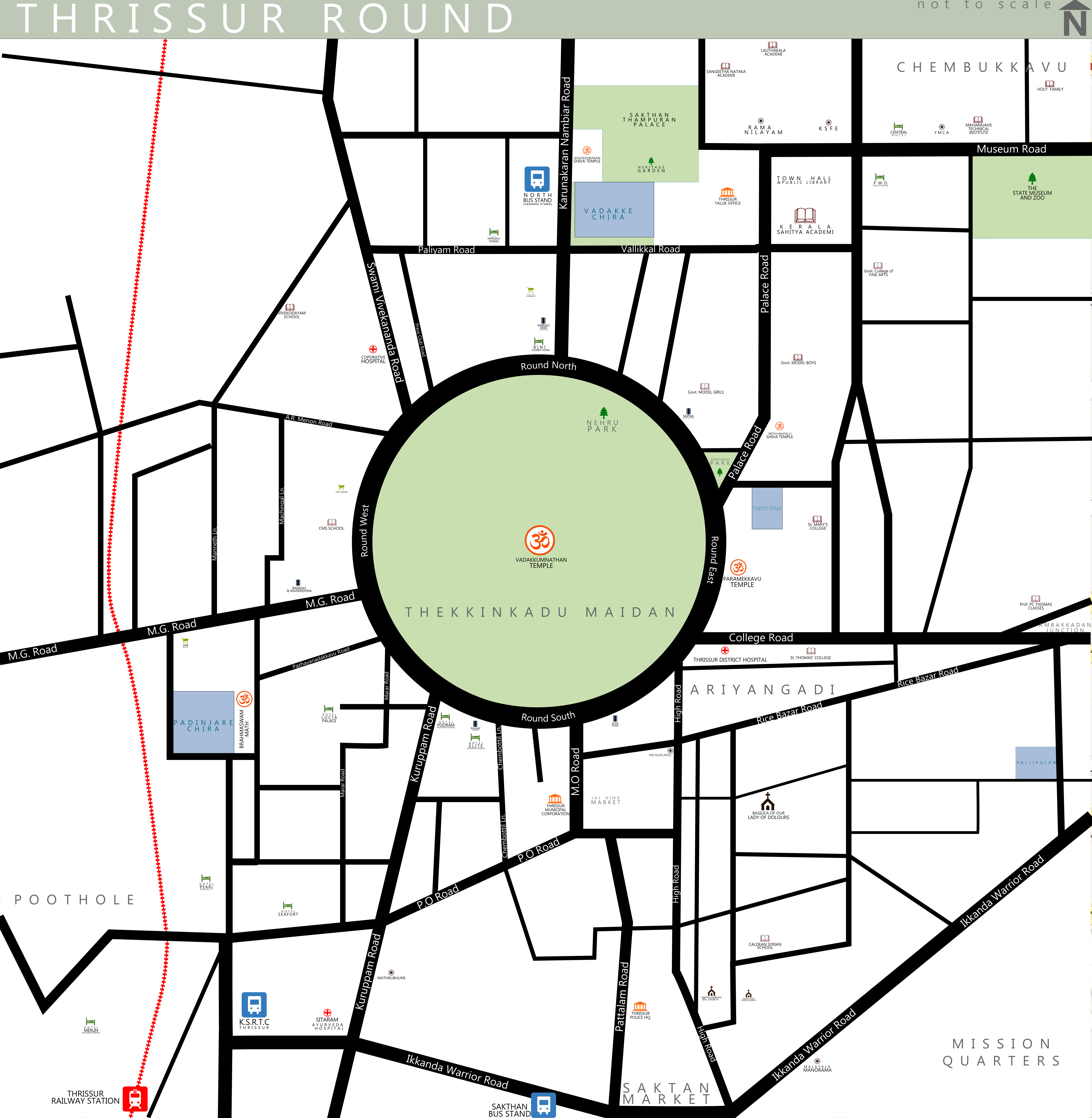
Schematic map of Swaraj round, Thrissur
