= Paramekkavu Bagavathi Temple =

Coordinates: 10.5247°N 76.2178°E

Paramekkavu
- Paramekkavu Bagavathi Temple
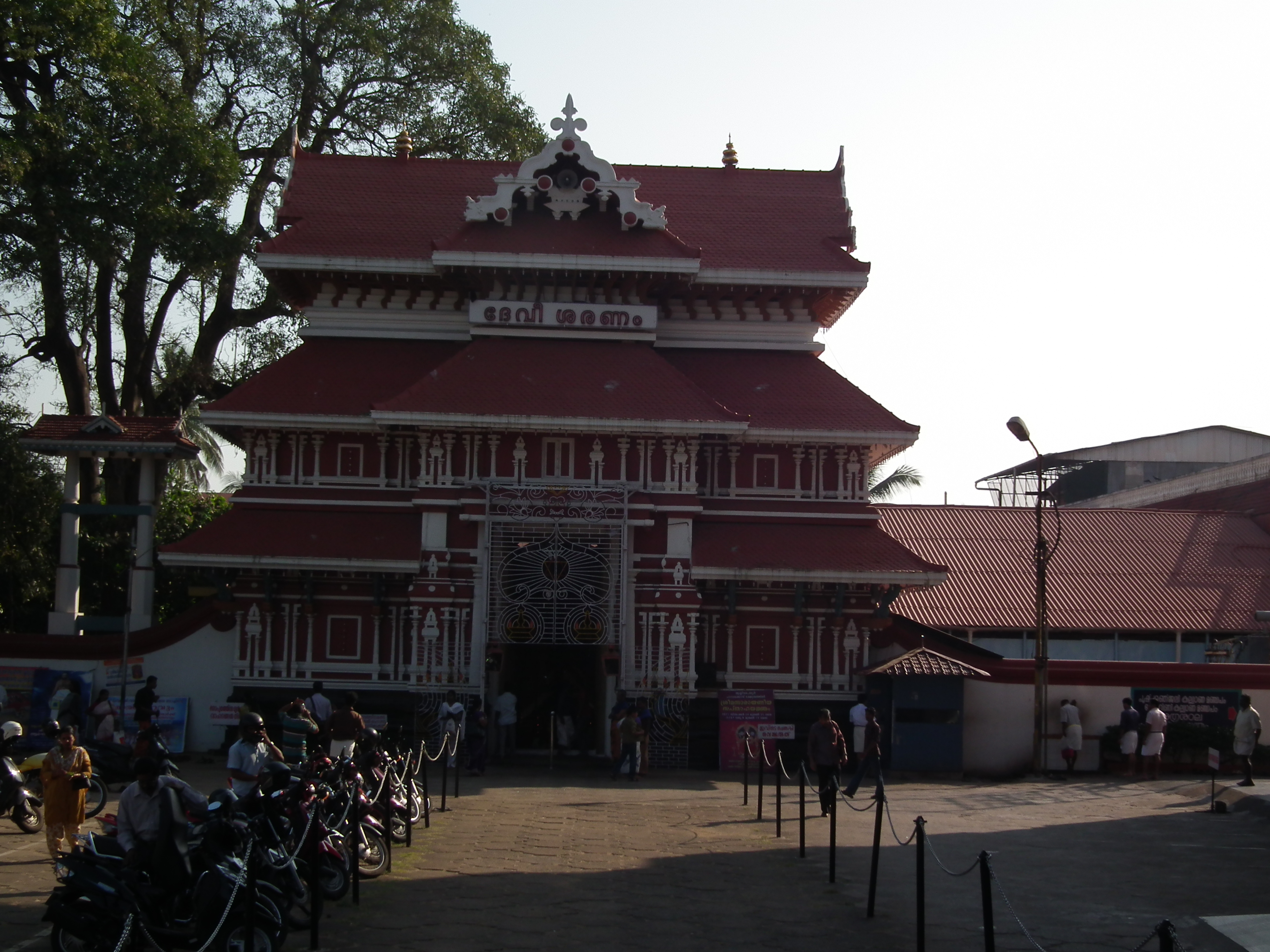

Religion
- Affiliation: Hinduism
- Deity: Bagavathi

Location
- Location: Thrissur
- State: Kerala
- Country: India
- Interactive map of Paramekkavu

Architecture
- Type: Kerala

Paramekkavu Bagavathi Temple is one of the largest Bagavathi temples in Kerala located in Thrissur City. Sakthan Thampuran ordained the temples into two groups, namely "Paramekkavu side" and "Thiruvambady side" for Thrissur Pooram which is the biggest festival in South India and Kerala. These two groups are headed by the principal participants, Paramekkavu Bagavathi Temple at Thrissur Swaraj Round and Thiruvambadi Sri Krishna Temple at Shoranur road. The two temples are hardly 500 metres apart. Thiruvambadi Sri Krishna Temple is one of the two groups participating in Thrissur Pooram. The Paramekkavu temple devaswom have a school known as Paramekkavu Vidya Mandir at MLA road near Kutoor and one KG section near to the temple itself.
