= Cochin Devaswom Board =

- Abbreviation: CDB
- Formation: 1 July 1949
- Type: Religious
- Legal status: Active
- Purpose: Religious and Educational
- Headquarters: Thrissur, Kerala, India
- President: K. Ravindran.
- Main organ: Government of Kerala
- Website: http://www.cochindevaswomboard.org/

Cochin Devaswom Board is a socio-religious trust appointed by the Kerala Government to look after Hindu temples in central Kerala consisting of Ernakulam District, Thrissur District and Palakkad District. It is headquartered in Round north, Thrissur.

== History ==
The Cochin Devaswom Board was formed on 1 July 1949 in Thrissur city. The Travancore – Cochin Religious Institutions Act 1950 governs Cochin Devaswom Board. Cochin Devaswom Board is ruled by a managing committee consisting of three members. The managing committee or board consists of three Hindu members. The Kerala Cabinet can nominate two persons in which Hindu members in the Cabinet can nominate one person. Kerala Legislative Assembly can nominate one person. According to the act, any person, including a woman, who is a Hindu, thirty-five years of age and a resident of the Kerala state can become a member of the board.

The board is divided into two sections, namely Establishment section and Temple section. The Establishment section is in-charge of the administration whereas the Temple section handles routine rituals and functions of the temples. The Temple section consists of the priests and other temple functionaries. The Establishment section is further divided into four sections - Department of Administration, Department of Finance, Department of Maintenance and the Stores Department. There are five divisions namely Thrissur, Thiruvillamala, Kodungalloor, Chittoor, and Tripunithura Divisions. The Thrissur Division is the biggest in CDB and Chittoor is the smallest. The number of temples under the CDB is 413.
