= Economy of Thrissur =

Economy of a region in Kerala state, India

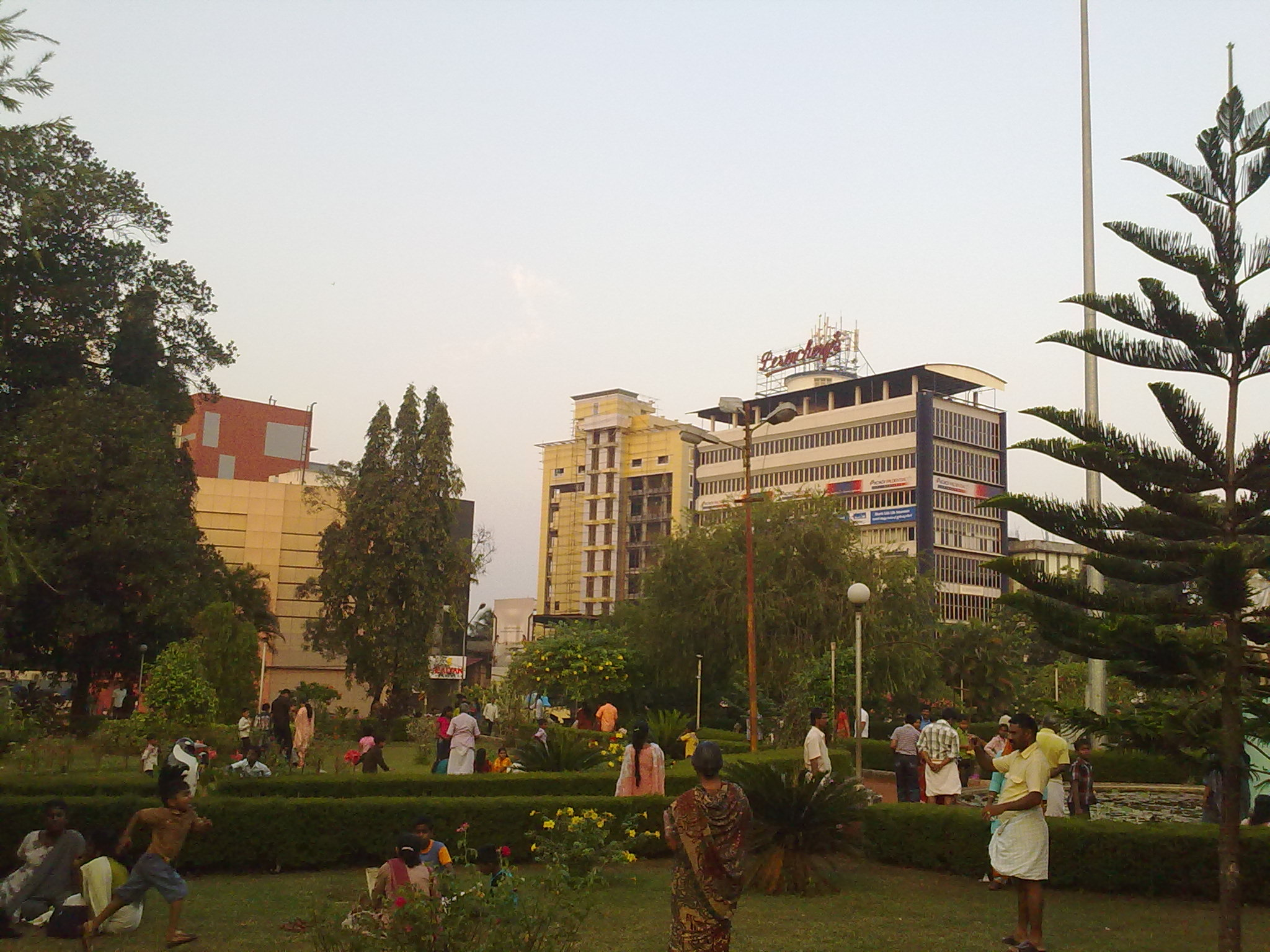
- Currency: Indian Rupee (INR, ₹)
- Fiscal year: 1 April – 31 March

Statistics
- GDP: $13.48 billion
- GDP rank: 24th
- Main industries: Banking; Gold and rolled gold manufacturing Retail; Ayurvedic drug manufacturing
- All values, unless otherwise stated, are in US dollars.

The economy of Thrissur is centered on the City of Thrissur and extends across the larger Thrissur metropolitan area in Kerala, India. Thrissur ranks 24th among most-populous urban agglomeration areas by gross domestic product (GDP), with a total GDP of ₹1,059.57 billion (US$13.48 billion) and an adjusted GDP (PPP) of US$51.31 billion. The city plays a significant role in Kerala’s economy, contributing 10.35% to the state’s GDP and 0.39% to India’s national GDP.

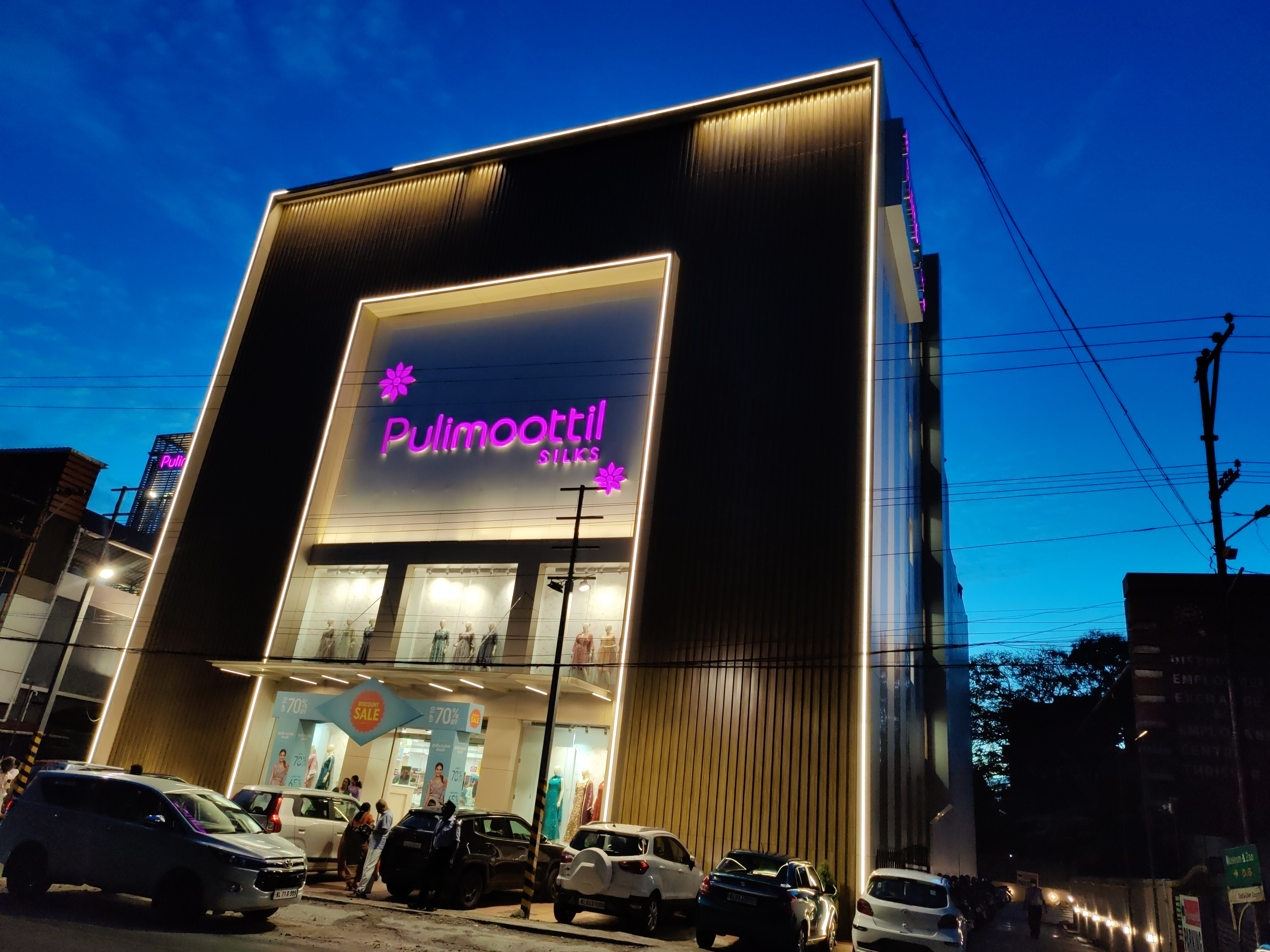
Showroom of Pulimoottil Silks in Thrissur

The city of Thrissur, the cultural capital of Kerala, is also a major commercial and business hub of South India. It is said to be the heartland of Kerala's business acumen and home to most every leading Malayali entrepreneurs. The city which is famous for Bullion, Banking and its Business acumen, is the darling of investors in Kerala. Thrissur is also referred as the Golden city of India. It manufactures 70% of plain gold jewellery in Kerala per day. According to a survey, Thrissur city has been placed on 7th among the ten cities in India to reside.

Thrissur is also one of the wealthiest cities in the Kerala state. With a strong economic backbone built on gold trade, banking, finance, real estate, and retail, the city is home to some of Kerala’s richest individuals and business groups.

== Economic indices ==
Thrissur is generally regarded as having a good quality of life, often outperforming several major Indian metropolitan cities in livability rankings.

=== Quality of Life ===
In 2023, Thrissur was ranked 550th globally in the Oxford Economics Global Cities Index, placing it among the top 10 Indian cities out of the 1,000 cities evaluated worldwide. Notably, Thrissur stood out in the Quality of Life sub-index, where it ranked 757th globally, outperforming major Indian metros such as Delhi (838), Bengaluru (847), Hyderabad (882), and Mumbai (915).

In 2024, Thrissur maintained its global position at 550th, once again emerging as Kerala’s second-best ranked city, just behind Kochi (521st). It continued to hold the 9th spot among Indian cities. By 2025, Thrissur made a significant leap forward, climbing 121 spots to rank 429th globally. It retained its 9th place among Indian cities.

== History ==
Historians say that the King of Cochin, Sakthan Thampuran, invited 52 Syrian Christian families from the neighbouring areas, established them at temple dining hall or mass feeding centres and encouraged them to do business in textiles. The industries of Thrissur contribute largely to the district's and city's economy. The presence of leading industrial houses in Thrissur has boosted the industrial scenario of the area. Though the city has numerous types of industries in Thrissur.

== Dominant industries ==
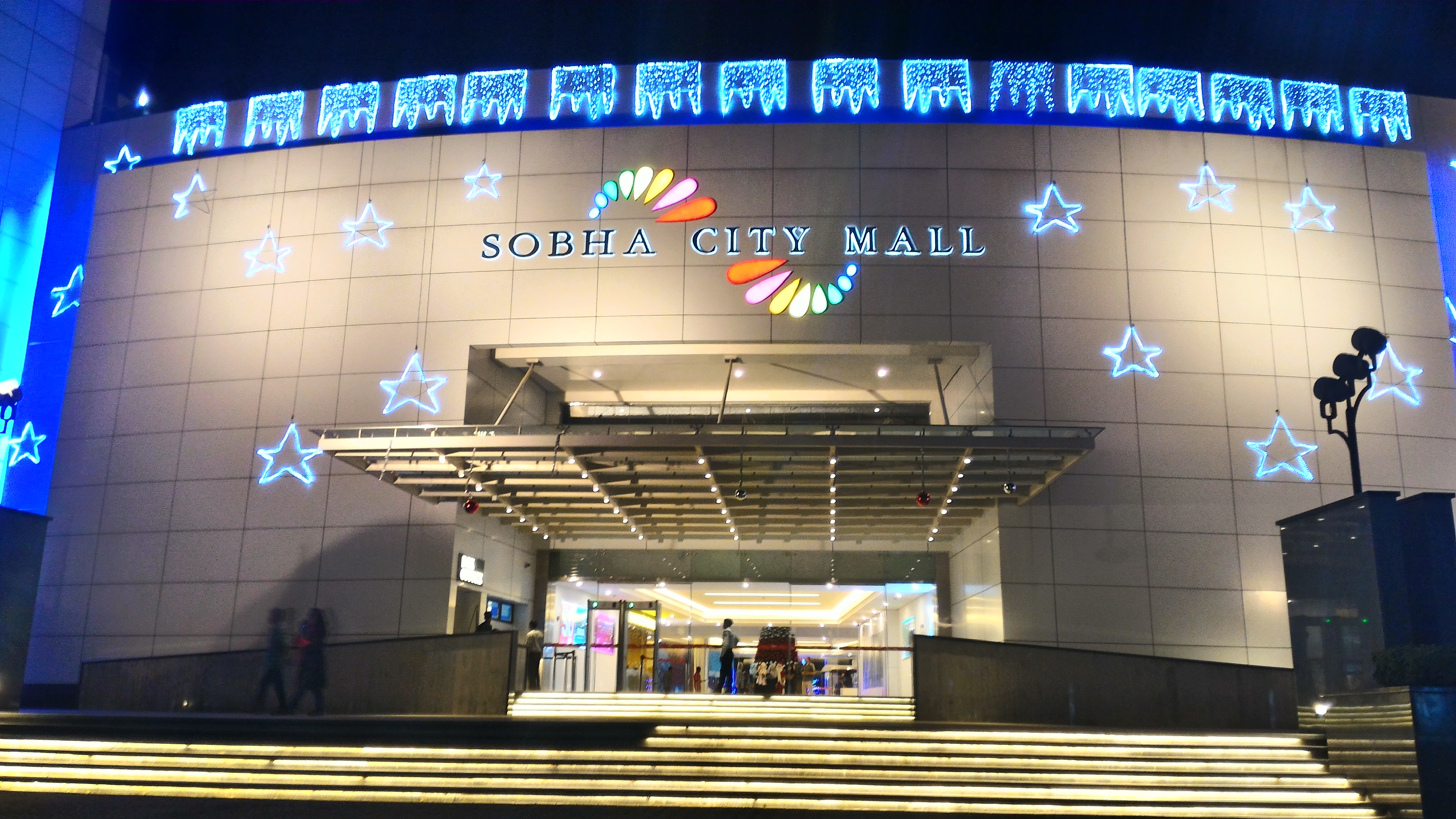
Entrance of Sobha City Mall at Thrissur City

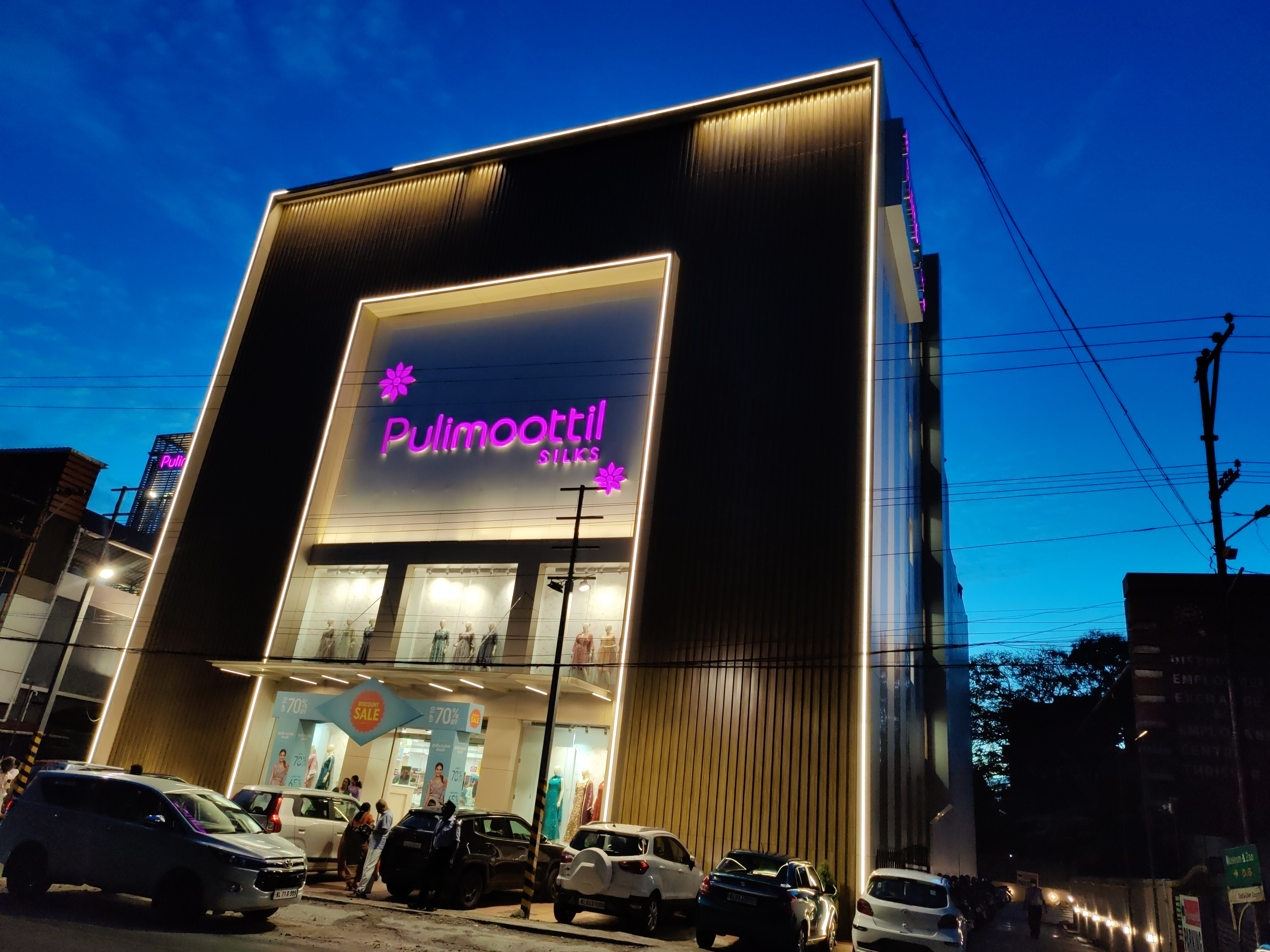
Showroom of Pulimoottil Silks at Palace Road, Thrissur City

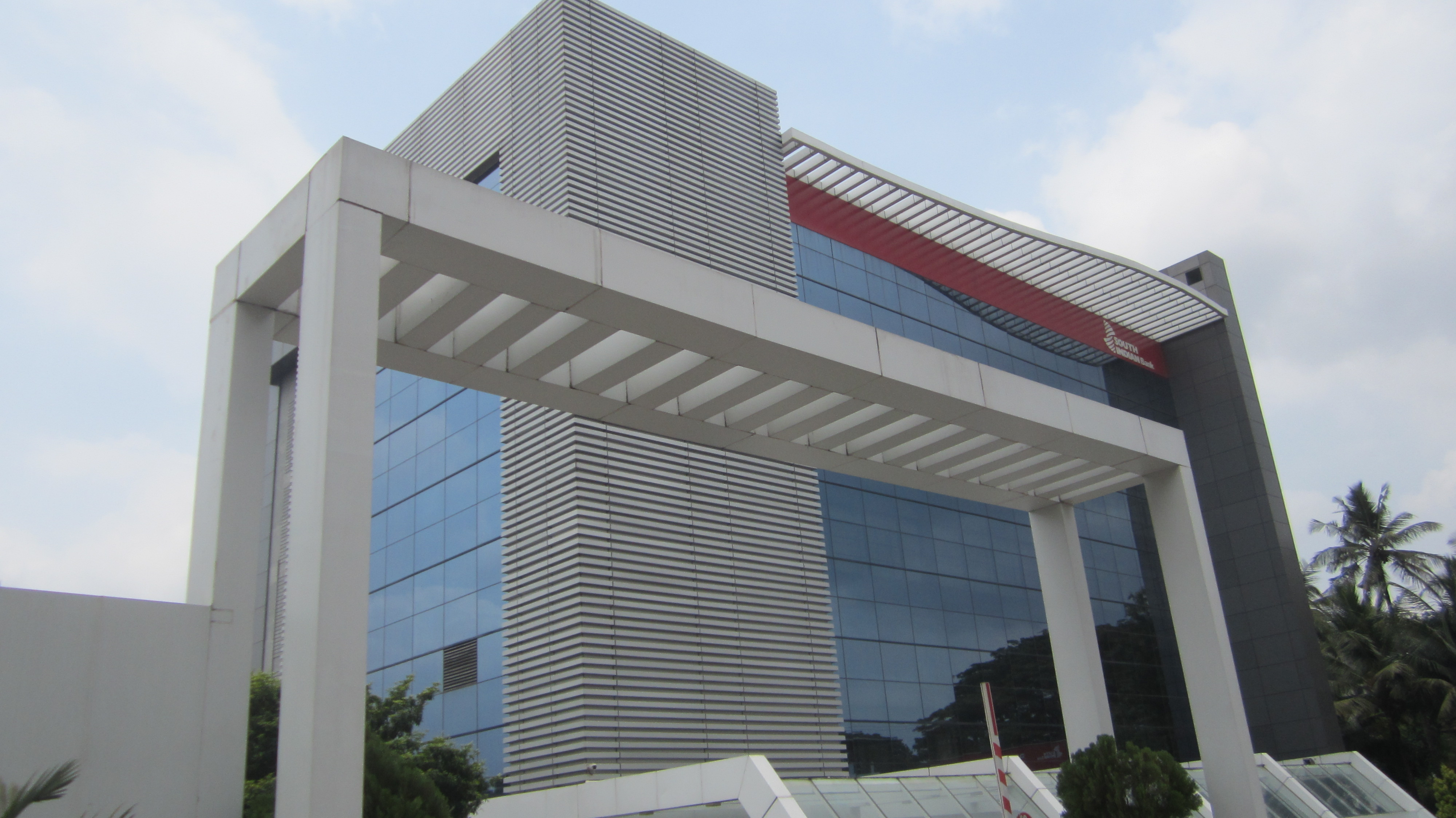
South Indian Bank headquarters at Thrissur City

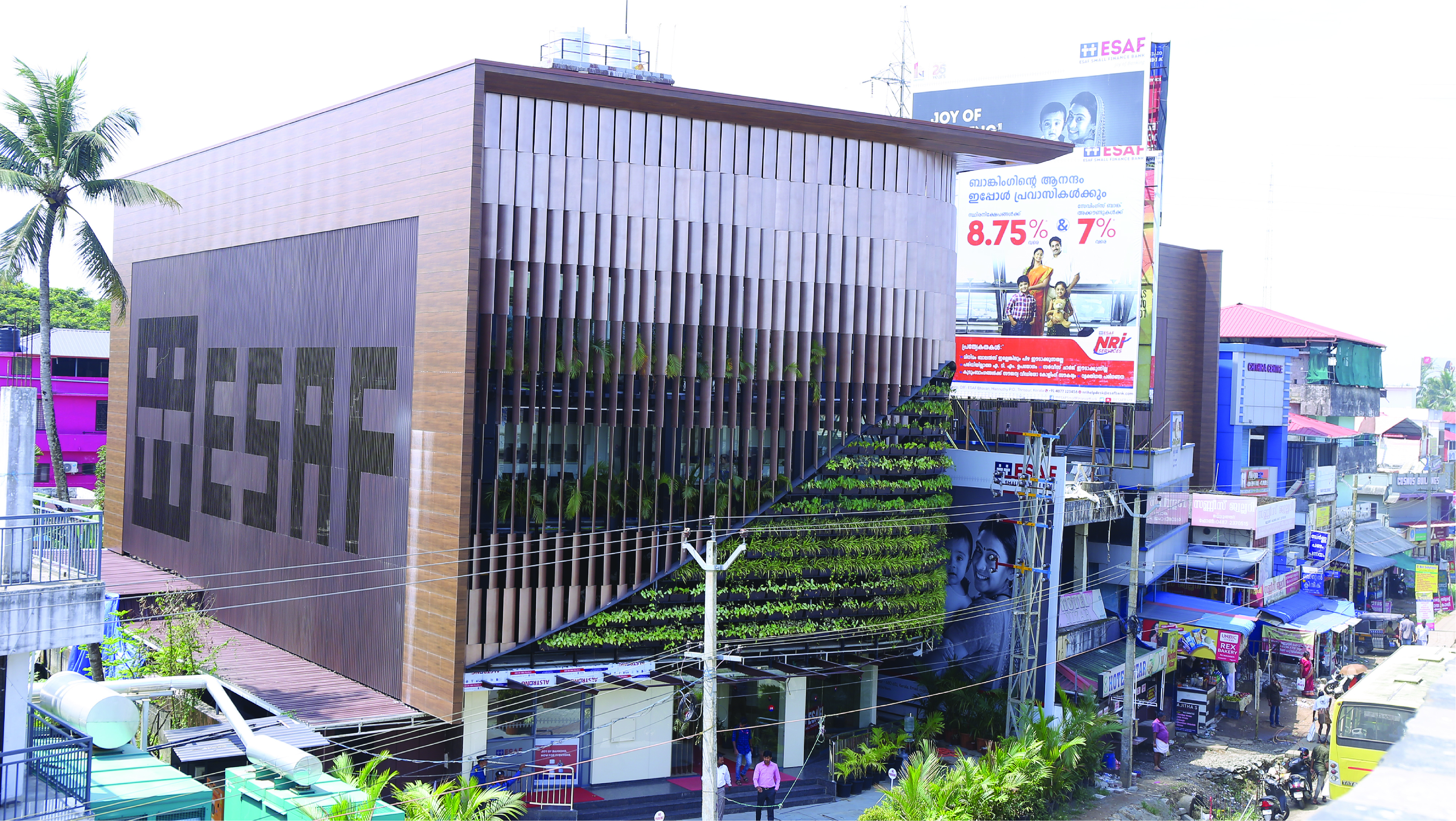
Headquarters of ESAF Small Finance Bank at Thrissur City

=== Manufacturing ===
Thrissur houses several major industrial estates developed by Small Industries Development Corporation (SIDCO), including those at Ollur, Kallettumkara, Arimbur, Mala, Kerala, and Kattoor. These estates support a wide range of small and medium-scale industries, contributing significantly to the Thrissur's economy. In addition to the major estates, Thrissur also features multiple mini industrial estates located at Ayyanthole, Chavakkad, Choondal, Athani, Koorkkenchery, Ollur, Pappinivattam, and Vallachira. These mini estates are aimed at encouraging micro and small enterprises in the region.

The city is home to several large-scale industries and public sector undertakings. Notable units include Nitta Gelatine India at Kadukutty, Kerala Solvent Extraction Ltd at Irinjalakuda and Koratty, and the Thrissur Co-operative Spinning Mill at Wadakkancherry, Thrissur. Other significant industries include Kerala Feeds at Kallettumkara, Kerala Lakshmi Mills at Pullazhy, and Alagappa Textiles at Alagappa Nagar.

Steel Industries Kerala Limited and Steel Industrials Kerala Limited, both at Athani, are important players in the engineering and steel sectors. Private industrial companies like Apollo Tyres at Perambra and Carborundum Universal at Koratty also have a strong presence. The Oushadhi operates from Kuttanellur, focusing on ayurvedic medicine production, while Sitaram Spinning and Weaving Mills at Punkunnam continues to be a legacy name in the textile sector. There are two KINFRA Industrial Parks at Koratty and Puzhakkal.

NewMalayalam Steel is headquartered in Mala, Kerala, Thrissur, Kerala. Established in 2017, NewMalayalam Steel specialises in manufacturing galvanised pipes, tubes, and sheets under the brand name "Demac Steel." The company operates an electric resistance welding (ERW) tube mill with an installed capacity of 3,500 metric tonne at its manufacturing unit in Kerala.

The economy of Thrissur is largely dependent on industries, retailing and financing. Thrissur is one of the most important industrial centers of the state of Kerala. Industries like textile, timber, coir, fishery industries, agriculture-based industries, tiles industries are present in Thrissur. However, the above-mentioned industries are not the only sources of revenue for Thrissur. The tourism industry plays an important role in Thrissur's economy.

According to the Registrar of Companies, the period from 1 January to 31 March 2010, 87 companies were registered in Thrissur and stood second in Kerala after Cochin. Thrissur's traditional strength lies in best entrepreneurial and financial capabilities.

=== Gold and Jewellery ===
Thrissur city can also be referred as the Gold Capital of India, since there is around Rs 700 crore business of gold every day in the city. All major jewelries in Kerala have branches in city. It is one of the main manufacturing centers of plain gold jewelry in the South India. 70% of Kerala's jewelry is manufactured in this city. Gold jewelry in Thrissur is well known for its craftsmanship and dexterity.

=== Retailing ===
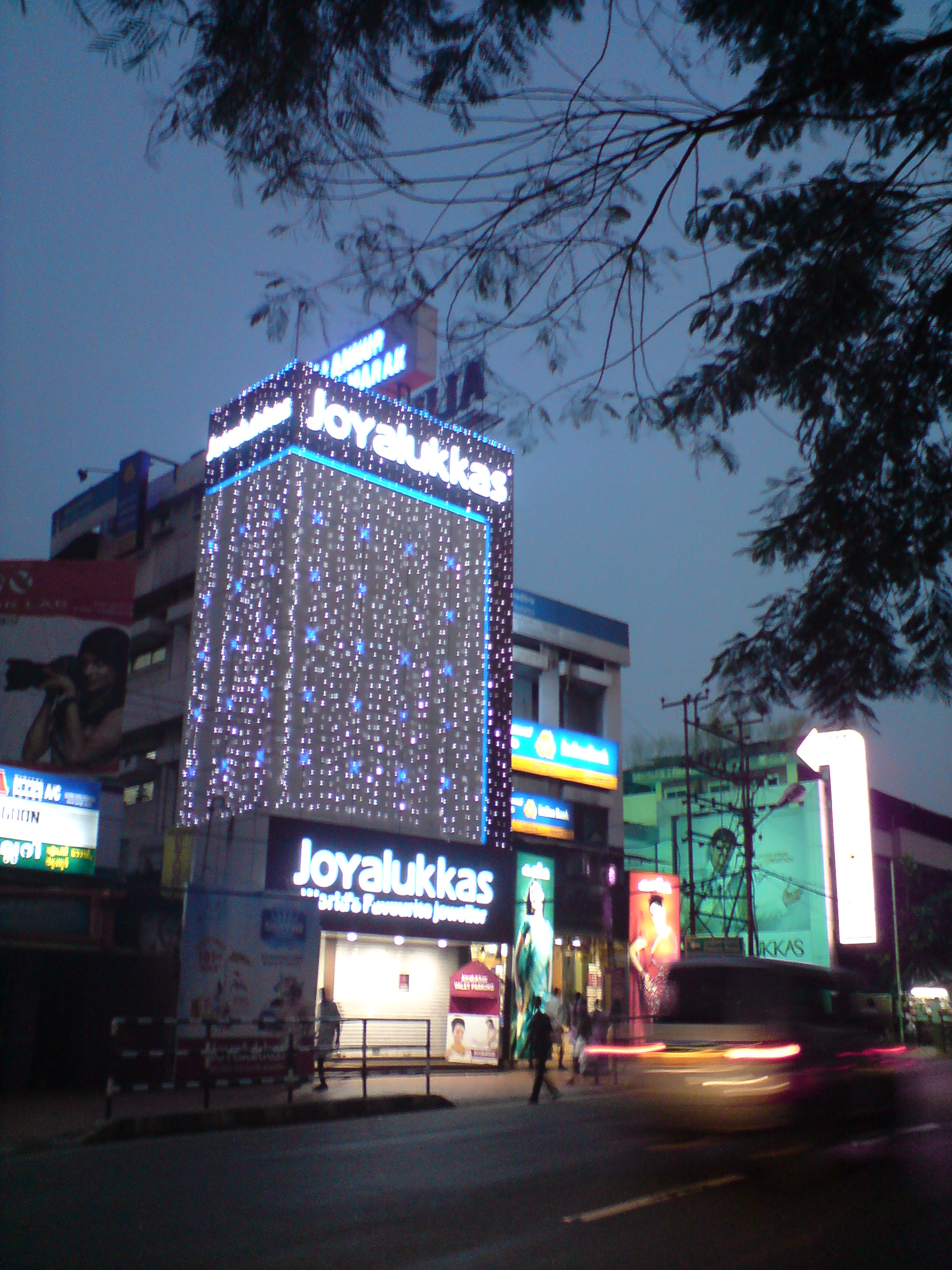
A Joy Alukkas store in Thrissur city

As Kerala is known more as a consumer state rather than a producer state, Thrissur also carries the same tag, as retailing is a big business and revenue earner for the City. Jewellery and textile retailing occupies a major part of the retailing business in Thrissur. Thrissur city is advanced in real estate sector. The City is considered as hub of jewellery and textile business in South India. Kalyan Group, Kalyan Silks, Kalyan Jewellers, Pulimoottil Silks, Chakola Silkhouse, Elite Fabrics, Elite Sareee House, Manshire, Fashion Fabrics, Jos Alukka & Sons, Joyalukkas, Josco Group, Chemmanur Group are the few to name.

=== Information technology ===
Infopark, Thrissur, located in Koratty near National Highway 544 (India), was established in 2009. The campus comprises nine villas, which are non-SEZ buildings, and one IT complex within the Special Economic Zone (SEZ), named ‘Indeevaram’. It offers a mix of plug-and-play and bare-shell office spaces. The campus is currently home to 58 companies, employing over 2,900 professionals.

The first multi-storeyed IT building on the campus is called ‘Indeevaram’, which translates to ‘Blue Lotus’. Situated on six acres within the SEZ area, the building has a total built-up area of 3.3 lakh square feet. It comprises a basement, six floors, and a terrace floor designated for food courts and other amenities.

=== Tile industry ===
One of the significant industries of the area, the tile industry of Thrissur, employs numerous labourers from the state and outside. The Thrissur tile industry is more than a hundred years old. Over the years, the tile industry in Thrissur has witnessed many rises and falls, but it has managed to withstand the bad times. Today, Thrissur can boast of 160 tile factories, making it one of the biggest hubs of southern India. The tile industry of Thrissur is aided by the presence of clay suitable for making tiles. The main centers of the tile industry in Thrissur are in Karuvannoor, Puthukkad, Ollur and Amballur. The tile industry has acquired Italian technology to improve the quality and production of tiles. The tile industry provides many jobs to the local people of the city.

=== Banking and Finance ===
Top publicly traded companies in Thrissur for 2020
| Thrissur | Corporation | Ref. |
| 1 | South Indian Bank Ltd | |
| 2 | Dhanalakshmi Bank | |
| 3 | Kerala Solvent Extractions Ltd | |
| 4 | Manappuram General Finance and Leasing Ltd | |
| 5 | Catholic Syrian Bank | |
| 6 | Kalyan Jewellers | |
| 7 | ESAF Small Finance Bank | |

The main strength of Thrissur's economy is its financial capabilities. The banking system in Thrissur has been accredited for the effective disbursement of credit to the various sectors of Kerala society. It had played a big role in Kerala's economy from the early part of the 1800s. It was started by Christian traders in the form of Chit fund. Gradually, Chit fund contributed much to the development of the banking industry in Thrissur.

In the early 20th century, Thrissur emerged as a prominent banking hub, with numerous banks established by various communities. Notably, the Malayali Bank, founded in 1919 by the Namboodiris, and the CSB Bank, established in 1921 by C.R. Iyyunni, a lawyer and social activist, are among the earliest. Other community-driven banks included the Chaldean Syrian Bank and the Dhanlaxmi Bank, founded in 1927 by Tamil Brahmins. Unlike these, the South Indian Bank, established in 1929 by 42 businessmen, was unique in its secular approach.

The proliferation of banks in Thrissur was influenced by strategic decisions made by Sakthan Thampuran, the Kingdom of Cochin from 1751 to 1805. He shifted the capital from Mattancherry to Thrissur to avoid colonial conflicts and to leverage its central location for better governance.

Now, Thrissur boast the headquarters of four scheduled banks in Kerala, South Indian Bank Ltd, Catholic Syrian Bank, Dhanalakshmi Bank and ESAF Small Finance Bank. The city is also the headquarters of Manappuram General Finance and Leasing Ltd and Kerala State Financial Enterprise. According to the All Kerala Kuri Foreman's Association, Kerala has around 5,000 chit companies, with Thrissur accounting for the maximum of 3,000. These chit companies provide employment to about 35,000 persons directly and an equal number indirectly.

Following is the list of banks based in Thrissur.

| Bank Name | Established | Headquarter | Branches | Revenues | Total Assets | Ref/Notes |
|---|---|---|---|---|---|---|
| South Indian Bank | 1929 | Thrissur | 875 | ₹6,562.64 crore (US$700 million) | ₹74,312.15 crore (US$7.9 billion) | |
| Dhanlaxmi Bank | 1927 | Thrissur | 280 | ₹1,116 crore (US$120 million) | ₹12,286 crore (US$1.3 billion) | |
| CSB Bank Limited | 1920 | Thrissur | 426 | ₹1,617.49 crore (US$170 million) | ₹16,223.24 crore (US$1.7 billion) | |
| ESAF Small Finance Bank | 2017 | Thrissur | 400 | ₹1,546.44 crore (US$170 million) | ₹4,050 crore (US$430 million) | |

=== Ayurvedic drug manufacturing industry ===
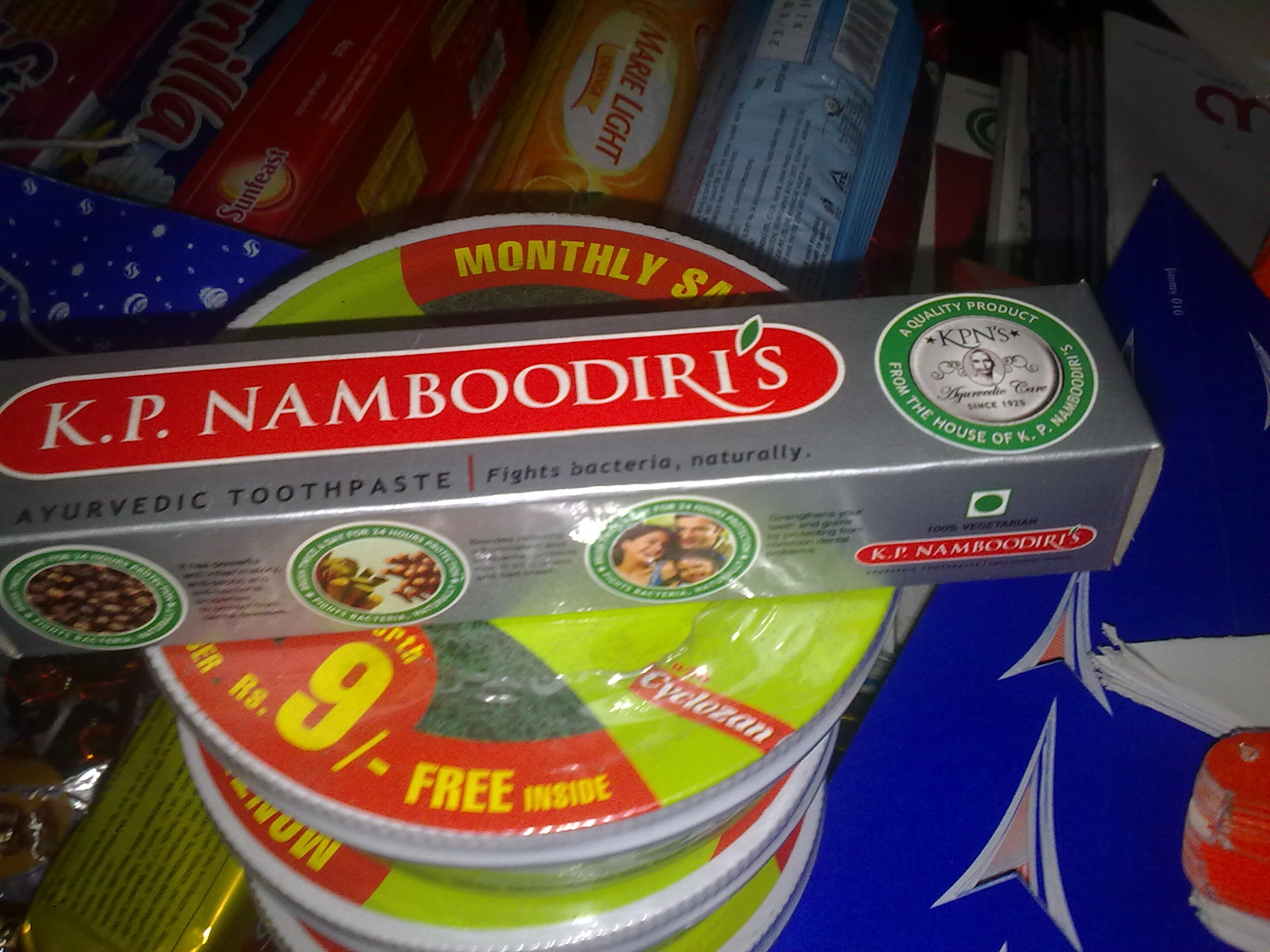
KP Namboodiris toothpaste, an iconic brand from Thrissur.

Thrissur is the hub of the ayurvedic drug manufacturing industry in South India. Thrissur Ayurveda Cluster, another initiative by a group of ayurvedic manufacturers of Thrissur, has developed a cluster in KINFRA Park in Koratty in Thrissur District. The cluster is meant for the comprehensive development of Kerala's brand of ayurvedic products and to train the manufacturers of ayurveda products. The cluster has facilities for testing and analysis, process product validation, safety study and manufacturing. The cluster is approved by the Department of Ayurveda, Yoga & Naturopathy, Unani, Siddha and Homoeopathy (AYUSH).

=== Textile industry ===
The prosperous textile mills have made the textile industry of Thrissur a leading industry in South India. At present, there are six such mills in Thrissur. The textile mills in Thrissur are Sitaram Spinning and Weaving Mills; Alagappa Textiles, Alagappa Nagar; Kerala Lakshmi Mills, Pullazhi; Cotton Mills, Nattika; Rajgopal Textiles, Athani; Kunnath Textiles and Vanaja Textiles in Kuriachira. Mainly hosiery products are manufactured in most of these mills. Thrissur is one of the leading producers of hosiery end products in Kerala. Popular as sewing threads, Vaiga is sold in every corner of the country. The first mill in Thrissur was the Sitaram Spinning and Weaving Mills. It was established in 1909 but was devastated by fire in 1953. However, it was soon reorganised and today it is one of the main textile plants of the area.

=== Diamond industry ===
Thrissur is known as the hub of diamond and gold jewellery production in South India. The majority of the units are located in Kapiparambu, Tholur, Adat, Choondal and Avanur in the Thrissur Metropolitan Area. There are around 75 units employing around 5,000 people. The diamond polishing work was brought to Kerala by P K Sankunni in 1964 from Mumbai. Because of higher wages and less encouragement from Kerala government, most of the traders are relocating to Surat in Gujarat. At the height of the business, there were 310 units and around 25,000 workers were involved in this business.

=== Thrissur Pooram ===
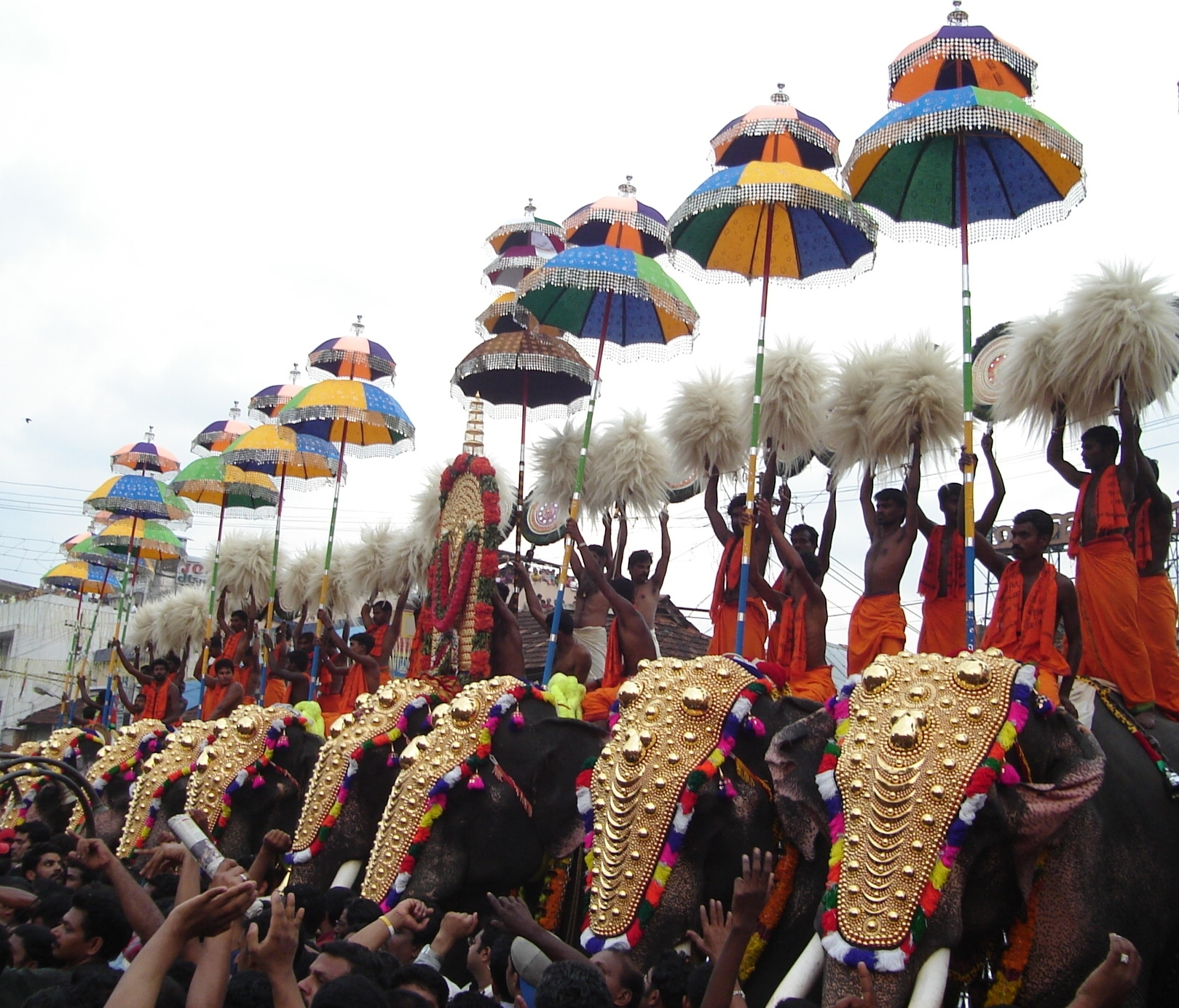
A formation of gold-caparisoned elephants at the Thrissur Pooram. Poorams are Hindu Temple-centered festivals popular among both Keralites and tourists.

According to estimates, around a million people around the world witness the annual Thrissur Pooram. The two main participants of the 36-hour festival, Thiruvambadi and Paramekkavu temples, spend about Rs 1.2 crore on the festival. Hotels and flats in the city give rooms and terraces for people to witness the festival on rent, charging Rs 750-1,000 per person. Liquor sales, too, see an increase during the festival. Sales through the various liquor shops and bars in the Thrissur city were worth around Rs 72 lakh on the Pooram day alone in 2008, according to officials of Kerala State Beverages Corporation, the government-owned liquor retailer in the state.

=== Real Estate and Construction ===
Real estate is one of the important sectors of city of Thrissur's economy. Land availability, image of a clean and green city, good law and order, reputed educational institutions and the tourism industry are the pillars of Thrissur's real estate. With Kochi becoming more congested day-by-day, in due course of time, the city of Thrissur is expected to see an increase in the number of property buyers.

Leading Kerala property developers like Asset Homes, Kalyan Developers, Hi-Life Builders, Southern Investments, Thrissur Builders, Cheloor Group, Vishraam, Elite Developers, Sowparnika Projects, Penta Homes, TBPL, Sreeramajayam Builders, Jos Alukkas Group & Developers, Sanroyal Builders, Maya Realtors, Skyline Builders and Sobha Developers Ltd are the major players. According to the Kerala Real Estate Regulatory Authority, Thrissur recorded the third-highest number of new projects in 2023 and 2024, following Ernakulam and Thiruvananthapuram.

=== Kuries ===
Thrissur is also known for its Kuries or Chit companies. Around 2,000 such companies are located in Thrissur city, both government and private. These Kuri companies have played a major role in developing Thrissur city into an economic hub in South India.
