= Places of worship in Thrissur =

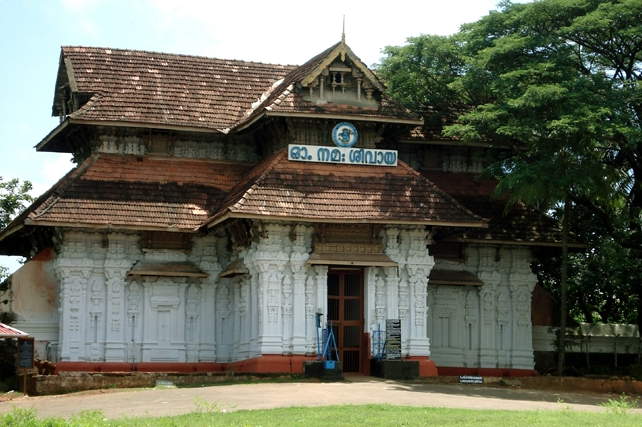
Gate to Vadakumnathan Temple

Thrissur is acclaimed as the Cultural Capital of Kerala state of south India, and is the headquarters of the Thrissur District. The demographic set up of the City provides an example of peaceful co-existence of different communities. The city is built around a rising ground on the apex of which is the oldest and largest Hindu Temple complex in the state, the Vadakunnathan temple complex, famous since the 8th century AD.

The temple and the surrounding open area (called Thekkinkaadu Maidan), measuring about 3.6 hectares, are encircled by a wide circular road called the Swaraj Round. Like most of the temple cities of the South, the main streets and business houses are located around the temple grounds. There are a number of other famous temples in the city. Thrissur has achieved the honour of the city with the tallest church in Asia.

== Hindu temples in the city ==
- Vadakkum Natha Temple : Non-Hindus are not allowed to enter this temple, which is also known as the Rishabhadri or Thenkailasam (Kailash of the South). This temple is dedicated to Lord Shiva. The temple complex also has a number of small shrines within it, dedicated to different deities, apart from the main Vadakkunathan Temple. The temple is known for its traditional architecture. The richly carved pagoda like wooden rooftop of this temple is an excellent example of the classical architecture of Kerala.In 2012, it was recommended for UNESCO Heritage site by the Archaeological Survey of India.
- Paramekkaavu Temple, Round East
- Thiruvambady Temple, Shornur Road
- Poonkunnam Siva Temple, Punkunnam
- Poonkunnam Seetha Ramaswamy Temple
- Kuttankulangara Sri Krishna Temple
- Shree Bhagavathy Temple, Olarikara
- Kuttumuck Siva Temple
- Kottekkad Temple
- Guruvayur Sri Krishna Temple

== Churches in the city ==
- Our Lady of Lourdes Metropolitan Cathedral
- Basilica of Our Lady of Dolours
- St. Anthony's Forane Church
- Mart Mariam Big Church

== Mosques in the city ==
- Chettiyangadi Hanafi Juma Masjid, PO Road
- Kokkala Juma Masjid, Masjid Road
- Salafi Juma Masjid, Near Railway Station
- Hira Juma Masjid, Near Pattalam Market
- Thrissur West Sunni Juma Masjid, West Fort
- MIC Masjid, Sakthan Nagar
- Patturaikkal Juma Masjid, Shornur Road
- Farook Juma Masjid, East Fort
- Al Ameen Madrasa Masjid, Poothole
- Chembukkavu Masjid, Chembukkavu
- Ayyanthole Juma Masjid, Ayyanthole
