= V. A. Shrikumar =

Indian filmmaker

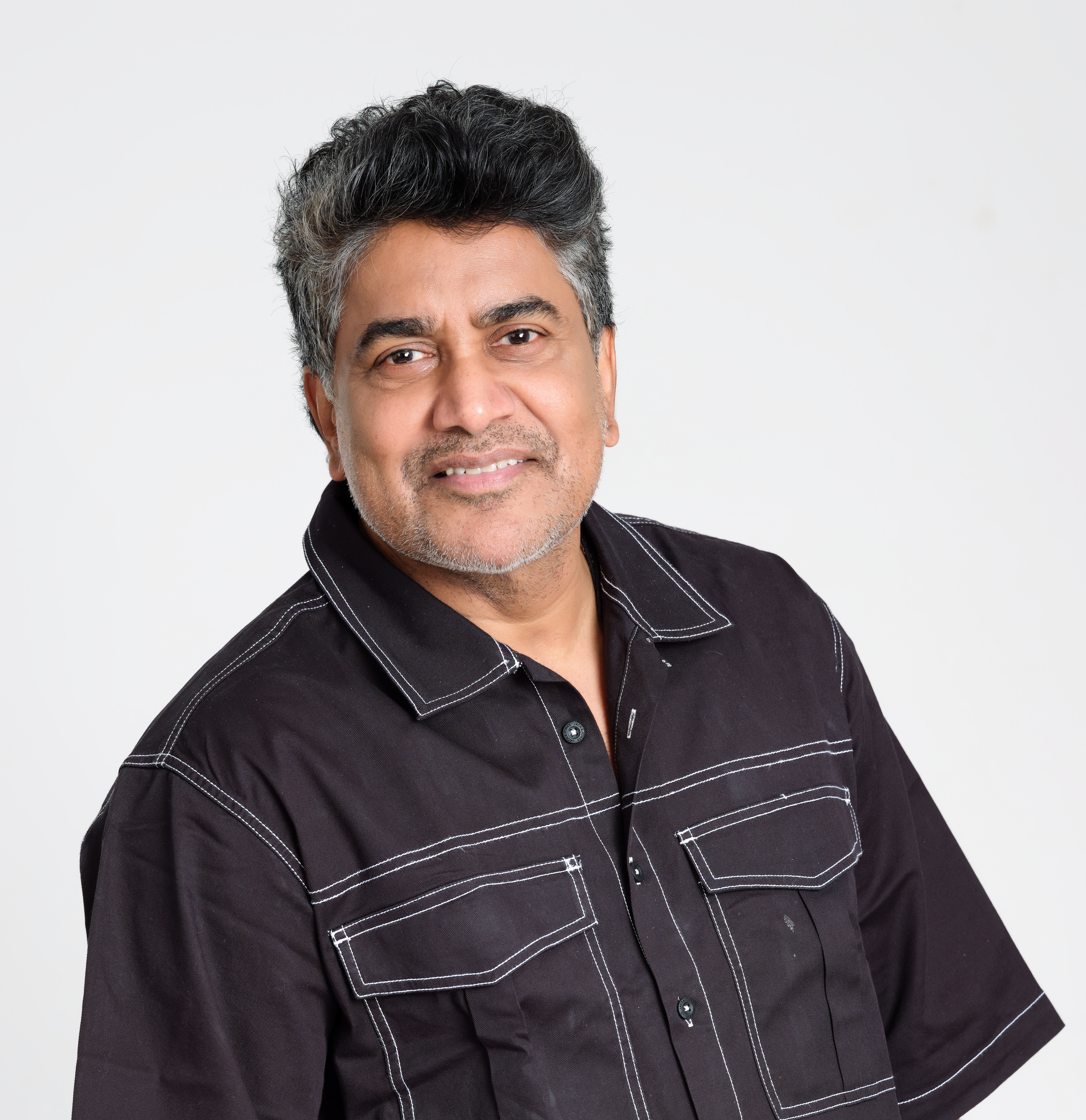
- Born: V. A. Shrikumar Menon; Palakkad, Kerala, India
- Occupations: Ad film director; Film director; Businessman
- Years active: 1993–present
- Spouse: Sharmila
- Children: Lakshmi Sreekumar

V. A. Shrikumar is an Indian ad film, feature film director and businessman. He has directed more than 400 commercials for various brands. He is the chairman and managing director of Push Integrated Communications, a marketing company. He directed his debut feature film Odiyan in 2018. Despite mixed reviews, it was a major commercial success at the box office, becoming one of the highest-grossing Malayalam films of all time. Before the arrival of K.G.F: Chapter 2, Odiyan was the holder of the first day's highest box office opener in Kerala, by collecting more than 7 crores.

== Family ==
V. A. Shrikumar was born in Puthur, Palakkad in Kerala, India. He studied bachelor of commerce (B.Com.) from Government Victoria College, Palakkad and master of commerce (M.Com.) from NSS College, Ottapalam. He married his college junior Sharmila. They have a daughter, Lakshmi Shrikumar, born in 1995.

== Career ==
=== Advertisement ===
In 1993 Shrikumar ventured into the field of entrepreneurship by starting an advertising agency, Colours of the World. But within one year, a big client of him got into trouble with the law and he was left with debts running to the tune of crores of rupees. It took him nearly 13 years to get out of it. Shrikumar's meeting with Ramesh Kalyanaraman, executive director, Kalyan Jewellers, to sponsor a programme at the Devi temple in Puthur, was a turning point. With Ramesh Kalyanaraman's father T.S. Kalyanaraman, also the chairman and managing director of Kalyan Jewellers’ support, Shrikumar got back to advertising.

Shrikumar started Push Integrated Communications Pvt Ltd in the year 2000. Mammootty was the Kalyan Jewellers brand ambassador for a campaign about the (BIS) mark in gold jewellery, Shrikumar made the BIS hallmark focus of several other brands within a few years. When the brand began making its mark outside Kerala, Shrikumar shot ads with Prabhu in Tamil Nadu, Nagarjuna in Andhra Pradesh and Shiva Rajkumar in Karnataka. The ads about price tag featuring Cochin Haneefa and the ‘Trust’ campaign "Vishwasam Athalle Ellam" series, which was chosen the TV Campaign of the Year at the Retail Jeweller India Awards 2012, got him noticed. Messages against malpractice in purchase of gold were addressed across all markets in the South through regional ambassadors. The one in Malayalam featured Dileep. When it came to focusing on products, the brand chose Sushmita Sen, Aishwarya Rai Bachchan and recently Sonam Kapoor.

Directing ads for Manappuram Finance and Kalyan Jewellers made Shrikumar popular. He created advertisements with Amitabh Bachchan, Mohanlal, Mammootty, Aishwarya Rai Bachchan, Manju Warrier and many other popular actors. It was the first time that four South Indian actors – Nagarjuna, Shivarajkumar, Prabhu and Dileep – came together for one television commercial shot in four languages, with Mr.Bachchan as the common factor in all the four. The ad shot for Manappuram Finance was made in 12 languages with eight brand ambassadors – Mohanlal, Akshay Kumar, Vikram, Daggubati Venkatesh, Puneeth Rajkumar, Uttam Mohanty, Mithun Chakraborthy and Sachin Khedekar. Of the lot, four were shot by Director Priyadarsan and the rest by Shrikumar. He has also worked with Priyadarsan for the promotional video of the Kerala IPL team, Kochi Tuskers Kerala.

Shrikumar has worked with Sachin Ramesh Tendulkar for Prime Meridian, a luxury property developer based in Kochi.

His clients include Wrangler Jeans, Sobha Ltd., Nilgiris 1905, Malayala Manorama, Prime Meridian, Meriiboy, Kalanikethan, A 1, Kaleeswari Refineries, AVT, Annapoorna, Amrita institutions, Kalyan Developers, Cellcom, Eazi Pens and Trinity Eye Care among others.

=== Feature films ===
In 2017, it was announced that would be directing the film adaptation of M. T. Vasudevan Nair's novel Randamoozham, which is based on the Indian epic Mahabharata, starring Mohanlal in the lead role of Bhima. The film was to be produced by B. R. Shetty on a budget of ₹10 billion (US$150 million), making it the costliest film ever made in India. Made in two parts and to be shot in multiple languages including English, filming was planned to start by September 2018 for a release in early 2020. However, due to the creative differences, Shrikumar and M. T. Vasudevan Nair parted ways.

In 2017, he announced that his directorial debut would be Odiyan starring Mohanlal. Odiyans are a legend in Kerala folklore, who can assume animal form by shapeshifting. It was scripted by Harikrishnan and produced by Aashirvad Cinemas, released in 2018. Despite mixed reviews, it was a major commercial success at the box office which was to be one of the highest-grossing Malayalam films of all time. Before the arrival of K.G.F: Chapter 2, Odiyan was the holder of the first day's highest box office opener in Kerala for more than 3 years, by collecting more than ₹ 7 crores.

In January 2018, Push Integrated Communications joined with Aeon Infrastructure to launch Push Aeon Consortium, a consortium joining newly formed Push Motion Picture Company and Aeon Entertainment. Together, they aims at investing ₹1 billion in production and distribution of films in four South Indian languages in 2018. The consortium also aims at building multiplex theatres in selected cities.

== Filmography ==
- Odiyan (2018)
- The Comrade (upcoming)
- Mahabharatham (upcoming)
- Mission konkan (upcoming)

== In the media ==
=== Odiyan backlash ===
Odiyan was a much awaited movie by Mohanlal fans. The movie had a huge hype with Mohanlal having a makeover for the movie. But the hype didn't translate into success for the movie, which did not live up to the expectations of the audience. With this, many on social media came out against director Sreekumar Menon. What he said in a way that created a lot of hype before the film was released became a troll on social media. With this, he came on the scene saying that there was an organized attack on Odiyan and that he was trying to destroy the film by making fake IDs.

=== V A Shrikumar and Manju Warrier ===
The controversy between actress Manju Warrier and Shrikumar Menon happened in late 2019. Manju, who has been out of cinema for 14 years, made her acting debut in 2013 with VA Shrikumar Menon, who ran an advertising agency called Push Integrated Communications Pvt. Manju also starred in several commercials made by him. But when Odiyan did not gain the acceptance of the audience, Shrikumar came up with the allegation that Manju did not stand by him. Manju Warrier said that she was facing threats from Shrikumar and that he was using the letterhead and documents she had signed for official purposes without her knowledge or consent and was spreading slanderous propaganda against her on social media. A complaint was lodged against Shrikumar. Following Manju's complaint, a raid was carried out on Shrikumar's house in Palakkad. Director Shrikumar Menon was then arrested but released on bail soon.

=== M T Vasudevan and Shrikumar ===
In 2014, M.T.Vasudevan Nair and Shrikumar signed an agreement to make Randamoozham. The agreement was to complete the film within three years. However, Sreekumar Menon had approached the MT court seeking an injunction restraining him from making the movie as the it did not materialize even after the deadline. The Supreme Court ruled that the script should be returned to MT himself and Shrikumar Menon's advance of Rs 1.25 crore should be returned.

== Controversy ==
In August 2024, charges were filed by a junior actress against Menon for sexual abuse.
