= KPN (disambiguation) =

KPN is a Dutch telecommunications company.

KPN may also refer to:

- KPN Travels, an Indian private travel company
- KP Namboodiris, Indian Ayurvedic company
- Kahn process networks, a model of computation for concurrent processes
- Korean People's Navy, the navy of North Korea
- Confederation of Independent Poland, a political party
- Kepkiriwát language, an extinct language of Brazil (by ISO 639 code)
- Kipnuk Airport, Alaska, United States (by IATA airport code)
- Kommando Peste Noire, an alternative name of Peste Noire, a French black metal band
