= List of advertising campaigns causing controversy in India =

This is a list of controversial advertisements in India and Indian community.

== 2015 ==
In April, Kalyan Jewellers pulled off a poster ad featuring Indian actress Aishwarya Rai Bachchan. The ad was said to be racist against black people.

== 2017 ==
- In September, during Navratri, a condom ad featuring actress Sunny Leone caused outrage in Gujarat.
- In September, an Australian ad depicting Indian god Ganesha with lamb caused major controversy in nation.
- In November, food delivery service Zomato pulled off several banners from various cities featuring two dominant Hindi profanities.

== 2020 ==
In October, Tanishq removes a 43-second ad from its social media accounts. The ad was allegedly promoting "love-jihad".
