= Thankam (film) =

2023 Indian film directed by Saheed Arafath

- Theatrical release poster
- Directed by: Saheed Arafath
- Written by: Syam Pushkaran
- Produced by: Fahadh Faasil; Dileesh Pothan; Syam Pushkaran
- Starring: Biju Menon Vineeth Sreenivasan
- Cinematography: Gautham Sankar
- Edited by: Kiran Das
- Music by: Bijibal
- Production companies: Bhavana Studios; Working Class Hero; Fahadh Faasil and Friends
- Distributed by: Bhavana Release
- Release date: 26 January 2023
- Running time: 145 minutes
- Country: India
- Language: Malayalam

Thankam (transl. Gold) is a 2023 Indian Malayalam-language crime film directed by Saheed Arafath and written by Syam Pushkaran. It stars Biju Menon, Vineeth Sreenivasan and Aparna Balamurali in the lead roles. The film is produced by Bhavana Studios in association with Working Class Hero and Fahadh Faasil and Friends. The film is based on an incident that happened to a jeweller in Thrissur.

Thankam was released theatrically on 26 January 2023, and received positive reviews from critics.

== Plot ==
From Thrissur, the Gold Capital of India, Muthu and Kannan are gold brokers. The movie depicts their voyage to Mumbai to distribute gold as well as the subsequent setbacks they encounter.

On one of the trips, Kannan goes missing and is later found dead in a hotel room. The cops contact his wife, Keerthy, to ask her to verify his identity. The police report that the door was closed from the outside using a different lock, the room was a total mess and Kannan was hanging from the fan with a pool of blood on the floor. He had several wounds on his body, which suggests that he was more likely murdered, according to the results of the postmortem. The 8 kg of gold supposed to be with Kannan, is found to be missing. Muthu and his colleagues enlist the help of Inspector Jayant Sakhalkar from Chembur Police Station to conduct an inquiry into Kannan's death.

As the inquiry goes on, it is revealed that Kannan planned his own murder with the assistance of his two other friends, Arul and Abbas, unable to get out of the debt he was in at the time. He told Arul only of his murder plan, and Abbas was told to create disarray in Kannan's hotel room, inflict wounds on Kannan's body, take the 2 kg of gold that Kannan had, and leave Kannan tied up in the room, locking the door from outside, with another lock. After Abbas left, Kannan untied himself and hung himself from the ceiling fan. Kannan did not have 8 kg of gold in his possession as he tried to present it to Muthu and everyone else. He had only 2 kg and gave it to Abbas to execute his plan. He tried to disguise his suicide as a murder in the hope that the persons in the gold business whom Kannan owed money to, would pardon his family as well as his partner Muthu if Kannan was murdered rather than dead by suicide. Jayant already had a few doubts regarding this as all the evidence were proving that Kannan was murdered. Nobody including the hotel receptionist, workers or other occupants heard a single sound of Kannan getting attacked and his fingerprints, which contained blood stains, were on the switchboard and the fan. After capturing and interrogating Abbas, Jayant concluded that Kannan committed suicide. Arul tells Keerthy that Kannan had entrusted him to tell her he tried his best and this was the only way out he found, and hands over to her a gold locket always worn by Kannan, as a memoir.

Muthu tries hard to digest the discovery that his friend hid such pain from him and decided to end his life, and speaks about trying to have the case concluded as murder and not suicide, partly due to his disbelief and partly to protect himself and Kannan's family from Kannan's creditors, the reason for which Kannan orchestrated his death. Keerthy, disillusioned by the turn of events, deposits Kannan's gold locket in a temple's hundial. All of them return to Thrissur from Mumbai, battling various internal struggles.

== Cast ==
- Biju Menon as Mathews "Muthu"
- Vineeth Sreenivasan as Kannan
- Girish Kulkarni as Inspector Jayant Sakhalkar, Chembur Police Station, Mumbai Police
- Kalaiyarasan as Abbas, Kannan's friend
- Aparna Balamurali as Keerthy, Kannan's wife
- Vineeth Thattil as Bejoy, Muthu's friend
- Indira Prasad as Ambika
- Anshuman Joshi as Anshuman Joshi, Marathi Police officer providing technical support
- Kochu Preman as Sasipillai, Kannan's father
- Thankam Mohan as Kannan's mother
- Srikant Murali as Mani Kurup, Malayalam Association Secretary, Chembur
- Abdul Jabbar as Arul, Kannan's friend
- Jain Andrews as Alex, investigation officer
- Ajit Koshy as DSP R. Kanakaraj

== Production ==
=== Development ===
In October 2019, Thankam was announced as the second production venture of Working Class Hero with the cast of Fahadh Faasil, Joju George, Aparna Balamurali and Dileesh Pothan in lead roles. The film was expected to hit screens by early 2020. But due to COVID-19, the production got delayed.

=== Filming ===
Principal photography commenced on 29 May 2022, with the updated cast of Biju Menon and Vineeth Sreenivasan in the lead roles. The first look of the film was released on 10 December 2022 hinting that the film would hit screens sometime in 2023. Filming was completed on 2 September 2022.

== Music ==
Thankam

Soundtrack album by Bijibal
- Released: 4 February 2023
- Recorded: 2022–2023
- Genre: Film soundtrack
- Length: TBA
- Language: Malayalam
- Label: Bhavana Studios
- Producer: Bijibal

Bijibal chronology
Lalitham Sundaram (2022)	Thankam (2023)	Neelavelicham (2023)

Singles from Thankam
- 1. "Devi Neeye" Released: 13 January 2023; 2. "Mayile Kuyile" Released: 4 February 2023; 3. "Manitha" Released: 4 February 2023; 4. "Vicharamazha" Released: 4 February 2023

The music of the film is composed by Bijibal. The first single titled "Devi Neeye" was released on 13 January 2023.

Track listing
No.	Title	Lyrics	Music	Singer(s)	Length
1.	"Devi Neeye"	Anwar Ali	Bijibal	Najim Arshad	3:12
Total length:					TBA

== Release ==
Thankam was released in theatres on 26 January 2023, clashing with Mohanlal's Alone. The film marks the last film acted by Kochu Preman. The film was released as a tribute to the veteran actor.

== Reception ==
Thankam received positive reviews from critics.

S.R. Praveen of The Hindu praised the film and wrote "Director Saheed Arafath and scriptwriter Syam Pushkaran masterfully handle the journey of the narrative, led by fine performances from Vineeth Sreenivasan, Biju Menon and others in the cast."

Kirubhakar Purushothaman of The Indian Express gave the film 4.5 out of 5 and wrote "Thankam is a character study of everyday people. It is mostly about Kannan and the length he goes to come across as someone he is not. It's about the facade humans wear to not show what they really are inside. One can argue that the big reveal doesn't justify all the build-up of the film, but that is just reflective of Kannan's life. He is not what we wanted him to be. He didn't pull an elephant out of the hat. He didn't surprise us the way we expected him to, because we didn't see through him. That's the biggest twist of Thankam."

Latha Srinivasan of India Today gave 3.5 out of 5 and wrote "Syam Pushkaran's script, Saheed Arafath's direction and performances make it a much-watch. As an investigative drama, Thankam is one of the best films that have come out in recent times."

Sajin Shrijith of The New Indian Express gave 3.5 out of 5 and wrote "While Thankam is not as dark as Syam's Joji, I'm not sure it has the latter's replay value. If anything, it is, like Joji, another testament to the fact that Syam can also venture into considerably grim territories."

== See also ==
- List of Malayalam films of 2023
