= Kalyan Sarees =

Indian clothing retailer

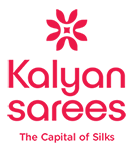
- Type: Private
- Industry: Textiles
- Founded: 1992; 34 years ago
- Founder: T. S. Ramachandran
- Headquarters: Thrissur, Kerala
- Area served: Kannur; Kozhikode; Thiruvananthapuram; Thrissur
- Products: Textiles
- Number of employees: 1,000
- Website: kalyansarees.co.in

Kalyan Sarees is a women's clothing showroom based in Kerala known for their traditional handwoven bridal Sarees and Lehengas.

== History ==
Kalyan Sarees was founded in 1992 by T. S. Ramachandran, the grandson of T. S. Kalyanarama Iyer who founded Kalyan in 1909. First showroom was opened in Thrissur, followed by showrooms in Coimbatore, Kannur, Thiruvananthapuram and Kozhikode.

Kalyan Sarees have partnered with actor Jayaram to be their brand ambassador.

== Activities ==
- 20 May 2006 Actress Mallika Kapoor inaugurated the renovated showroom of New Kalyan Sarees & Kalyan Jewellers.
- 28 November 2008 Actor Jayaram inaugurated showroom of Kalyan Sarees at Arayidathupalam in Kozhikode.
- 5 August 2011 Actor Jayaram inaugurated the new showroom in Kannur.
- 9 April 2012 Creative Agency Performance League ranked Kalyan Sarees 4th for March.
- 7 November 2012 Miss Kerala Deepthi Sathi inaugurated the Queen's Collection, a bridal show festival in Thrissur by Kalyan Sarees.

== See also ==
- Puttapaka Saree
