= V. P. Nandakumar =

Indian businessman

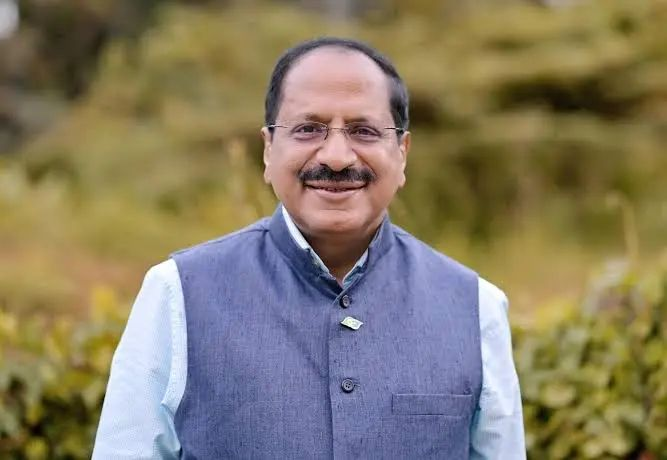
- Born: 1954 (age 71–72); Valapad, Thrissur, Kerala, India
- Education: St. Thomas College, Thrissur
- Occupation: Business
- Employer(s): Chairman and Managing Director of Manappuram Finance
- Spouse: Sushama Nandakumar

V. P. Nandakumar is an Indian businessman hailing from Valapad in Thrissur District of Kerala. He is the Chairman and Managing Director of Manappuram Finance Limited.

He is also the chairman of Asirvad Microfinance, the 4th largest microfinance institution (MFI) in India with over Rs. 5,000 crore AUM (Assets Under Management).

== Personal ==
V.P.Nandakumar is also the International Director of the Lion's Club International.
