= Punkunnam =

Punkunnam Punkunnu
- Neighbourhood
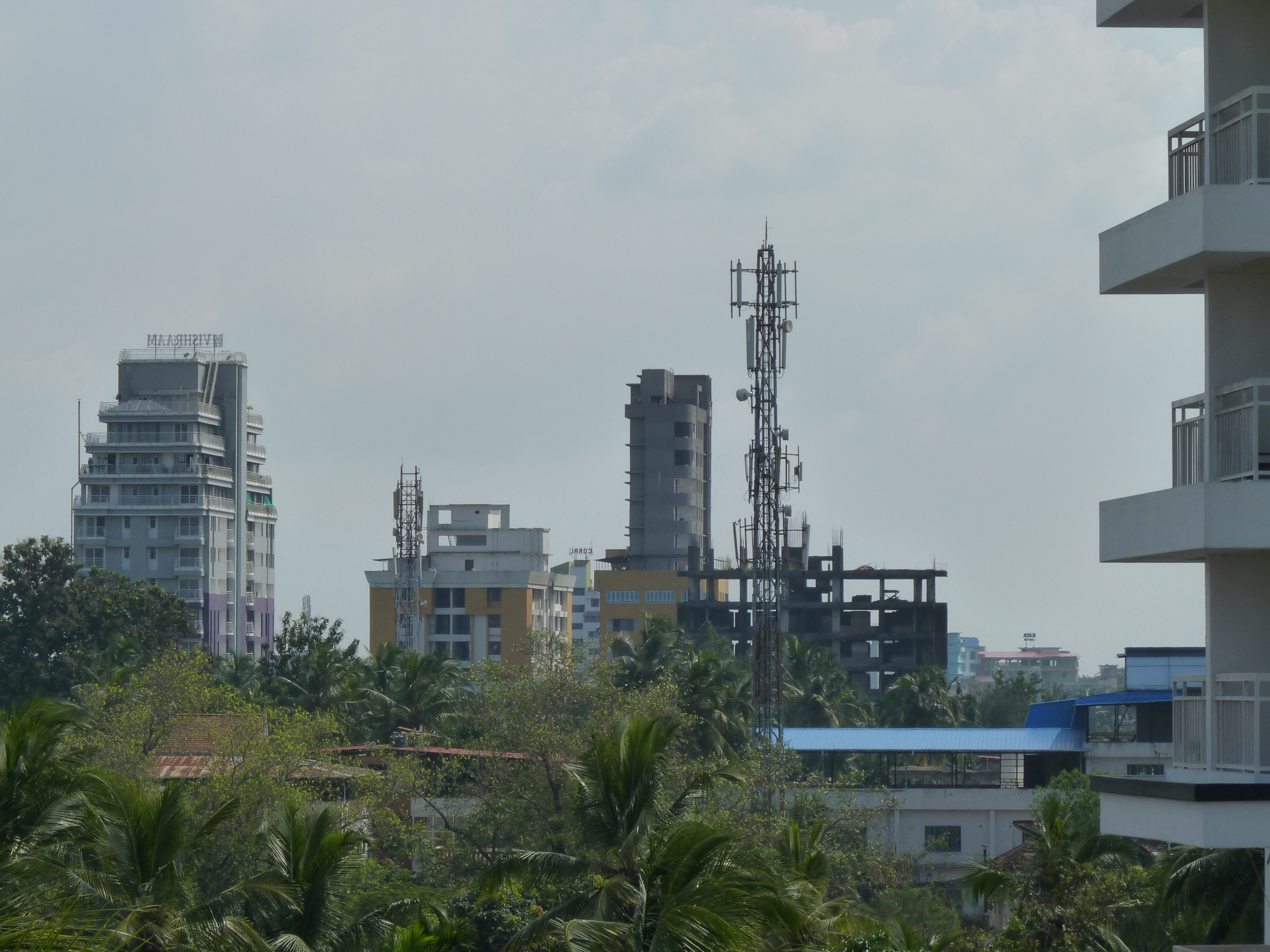

- Location in Kerala, India Punkunnam (India)
- Coordinates: 10.535249°N 76.20147°E
- Country: India
- State: Kerala
- District: Thrissur

Government
  - Body: Thrissur Municipal Corporation

Languages
  - Official: Malayalam, English
- Time zone: UTC+5:30 (IST)
- Postal code: 680002
- Vehicle registration: KL-08
- Nearest city: Thrissur
- Civic agency: Thrissur Municipal Corporation

Punkunnam is a commercial and residential neighbourhood in the city of Thrissur, Kerala, India. It is 2 km away from the Swaraj Round. Punkunnam is home to the renowned Punkunnam Siva Temple. Sitaram Textiles is situated here. It was established in the early 1940s. The spinning wing has the capacity of 12,000 spindles. The mill also has a capacity to process 40,000 meters of cloth every day. Poonkunnam Railway Station provides rail connectivity to other parts of Kerala and India. Punkunnam is witnessing a real estate boom.

== Development ==
There are several Banks functioning in Punkunnam. Dhanlaxmi Bank (zonal office and Corporate centre), South Indian Bank, Catholic Syrian Bank, Canara Bank, Bank of Baroda, Punjab National Bank, State Bank of India, Federal Bank and HDFC Bank has got branches at Punkunnam. The bottle neck at poonkunam was removed by demolishing the old buildings at the junction with the co-operation of owners and Thrissur corporation pave a way to the development of the place. The headquarters of Kalyan Jewelers, the largest jewelry chain in India is situated at Punkunnam. The infertility clinic KARE of Dr Krishnankutty is situated at Punkunnam.

== Religion ==
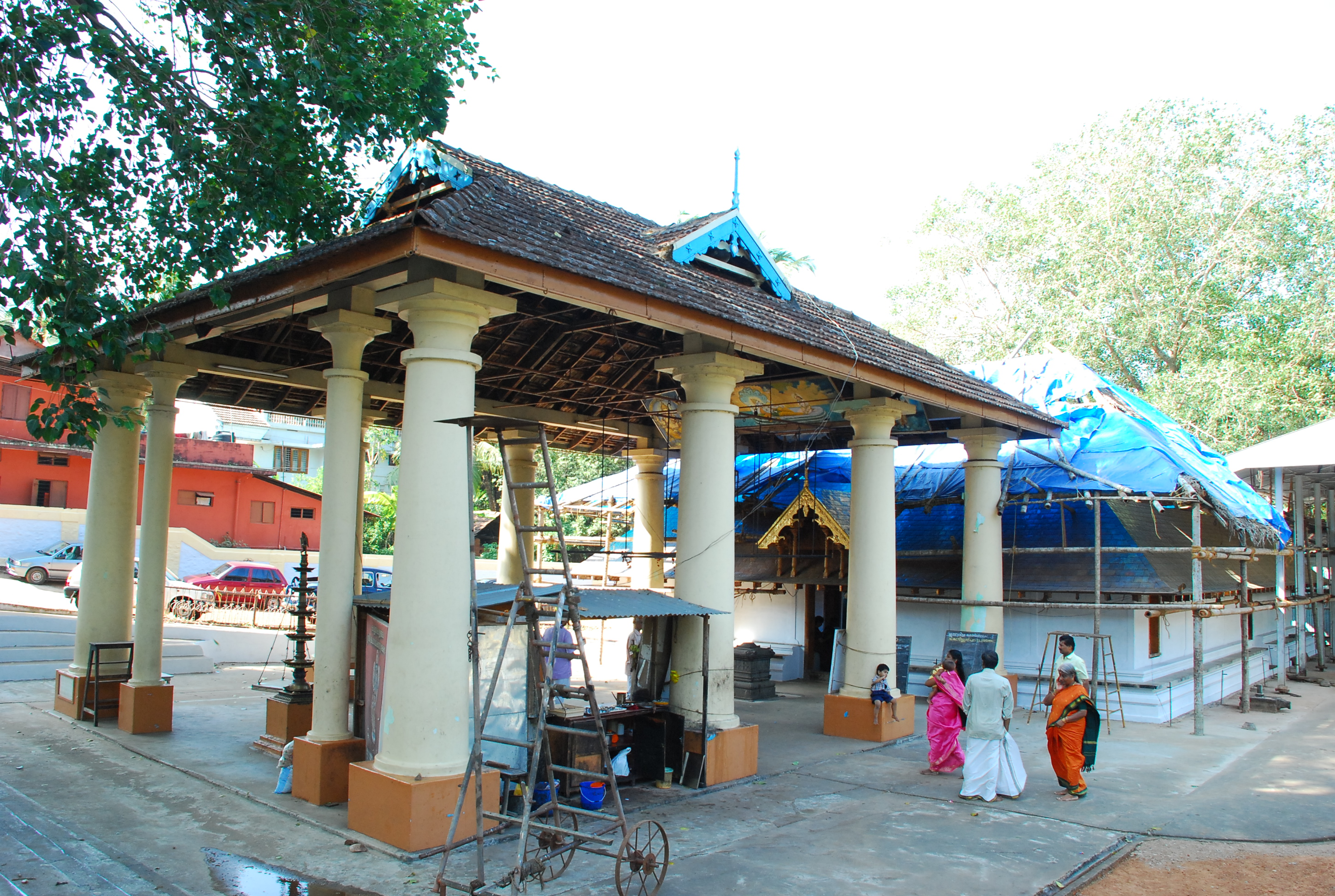
Kuttankulangara Temple

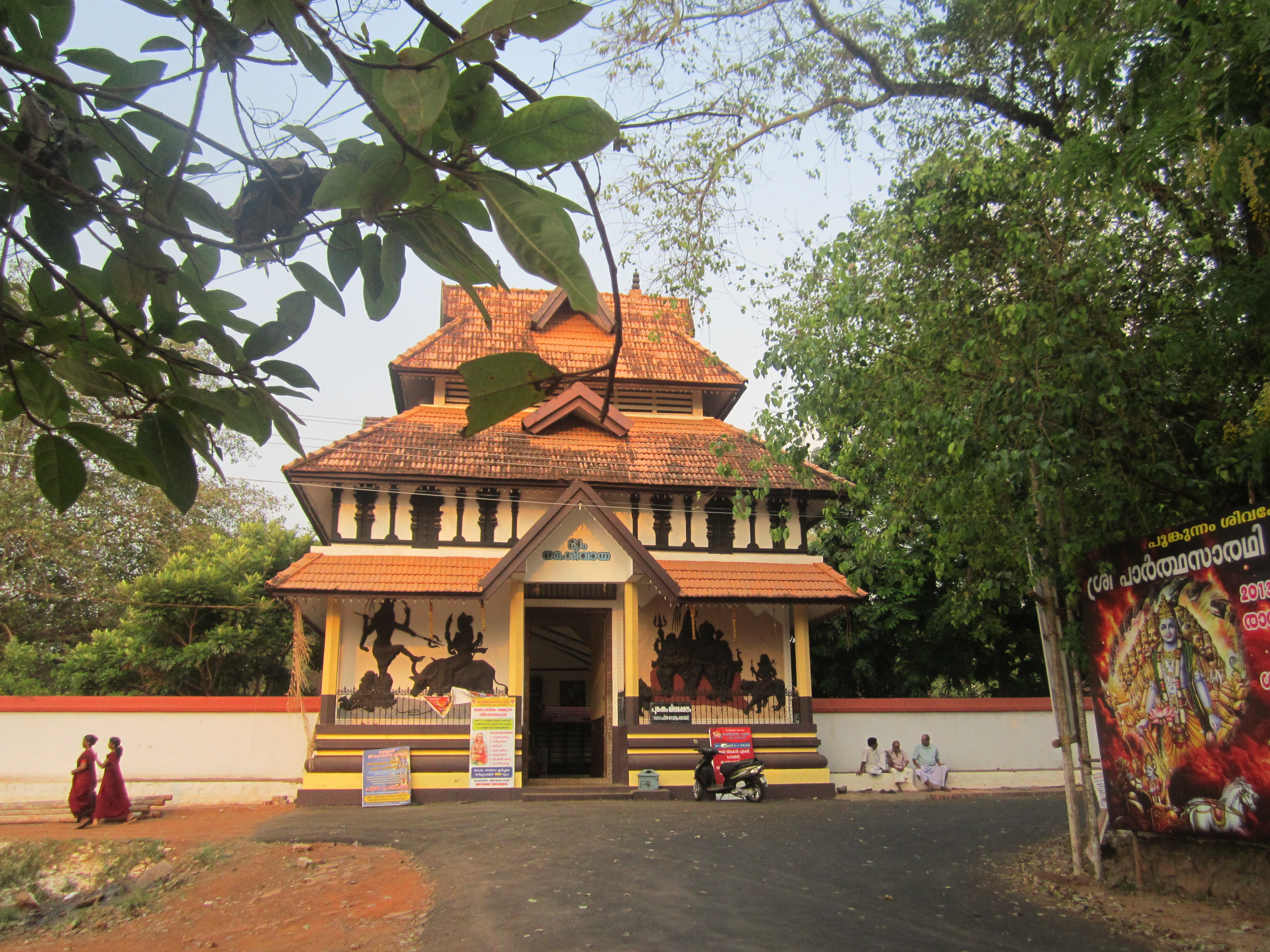
One among the three main Siva Temples of Thrissur

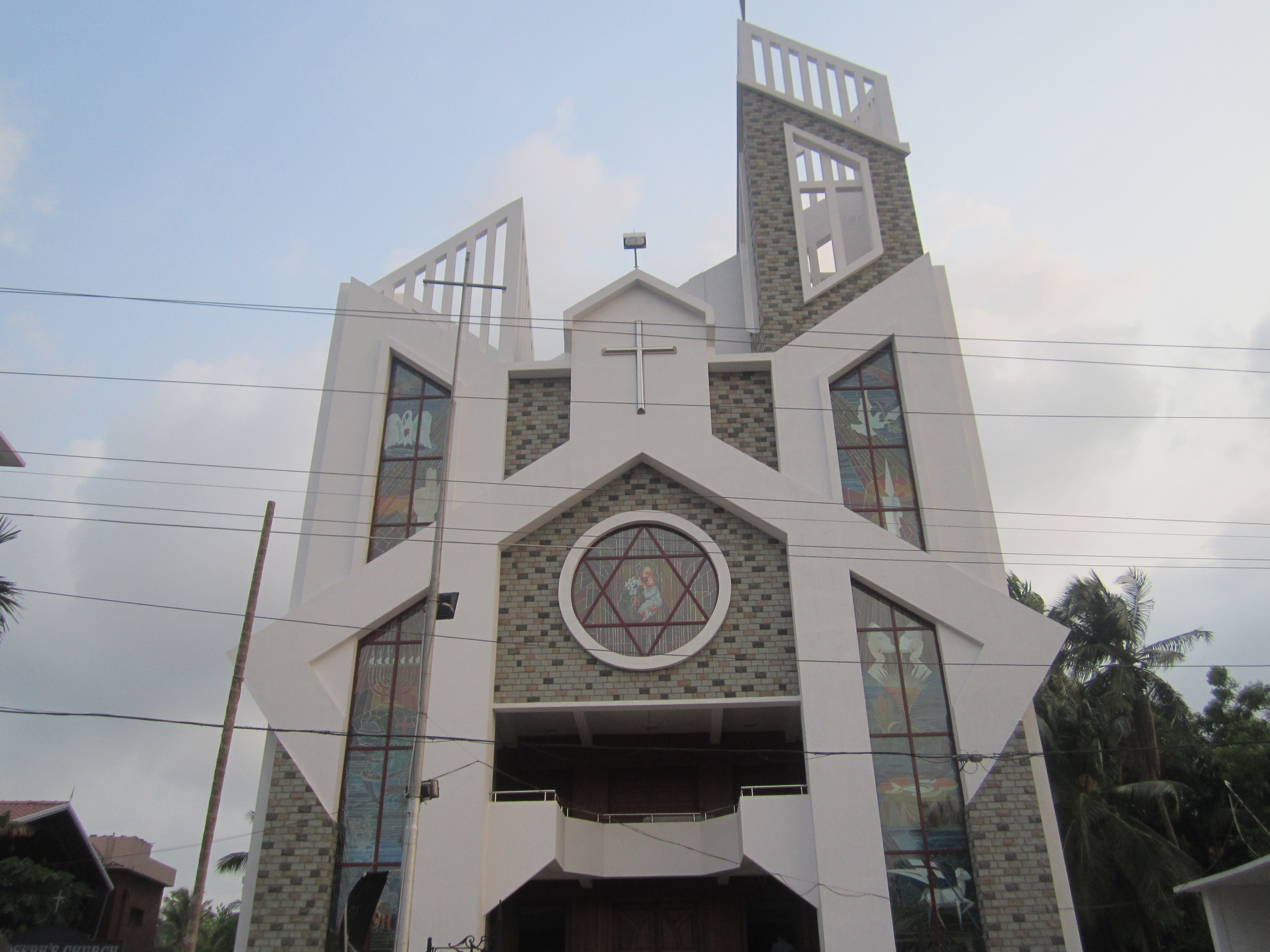
Punkunnam Church, Thrissur

Punkunnam has some of the famous temples in Thrissur city like Punkunnam Siva Temple, Punkunnam Seetha Ramaswamy Temple, Kuttankulangara Sri Krishna Temple and Sri Sankarankulangara Temple. Punkunnam Seetha Ramaswamy Temple have got a Ratholsavam festival which is second after Kalpathy ratholsavam. Besides these temples Punkunnam have also got a Christian church. Pushpagiri Agraharam is situated at Punkunnam where the majority of the residents here are Tamil Brahmins. Kerala Brahmana Sabha Thrissur Unit, is situated at Pushpagiri Agraharam, Punkunnam.

== Notable residents ==
- T.S. Kalyanaraman — chairman and managing director of Kalyan Jewellers
- Priya Prakash Varrier — actress, model, and singer

== See also ==
- List of Thrissur Corporation wards
