= Sitaram Spinning and Weaving Mills =

Indian mills

Sitaram Spinning and Weaving Mills is a Kerala Government managed mills situated in Poonkunnam, Thrissur City of Kerala, India. It was the first mill in Thrissur district. It was established in Poonkunnam by TR Ramachandra Iyer in the early 1940s. The spinning wing has the capacity of 12,000 spindles and German made machines. The mill can process 40,000 meters of cloth every day.
