= Kalyan Group =

Indian holding company

- Company type: Private
- Industry: Retailing
- Founded: India
- Headquarters: Thrissur
- Area served: South India
- Key people: T. S. Kalyanaraman (Kalyan Jewellers); T. S. Pattabhiraman (Kalyan Silks); T. S. Ramachandran (Kalyan Sarees)
- Products: Kalyan Silks; Kalyan Jewellers; Kalyan Developers; Kalyan Sarees; Kalyan Vastralaya; Kalyan Collections
- Number of employees: 10,000

Kalyan Group is a holding company for the brands of Kalyan Silks, Kalyan Jewellers, Kalyan Developers, Kalyan Sarees and Kalyan Collections. It is headquartered in Thrissur, Kerala, India.

== History ==
The group was started in 1909 by T. S. Kalyanarama Iyer, a priest who turned into an entrepreneur. He started a textile mill in Thrissur city in the 1930s, which was later taken over by Government of Kerala. He came from Kumbakonam in Tamil Nadu. Later, he started a textile shop in Thrissur city which flourished in Kalyan Silks, Kalyan Sarees and Kalyan Collections. The group got its name from its founder Kalyanarama Iyer. Later his son T. K. Seetharamaiyer also joined the business. Seetharamaiyer in 1991 partitioned the businesses to five sons. T. S. Kalyanaraman, one of the five sons started the Kalyan Jewellers in 1993.
