= Kalyan Silks =

Indian textile retailer

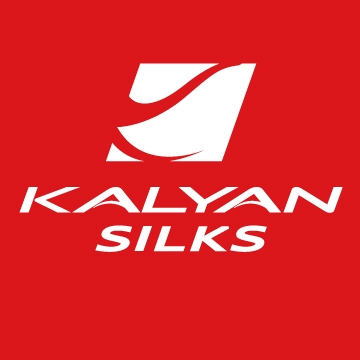

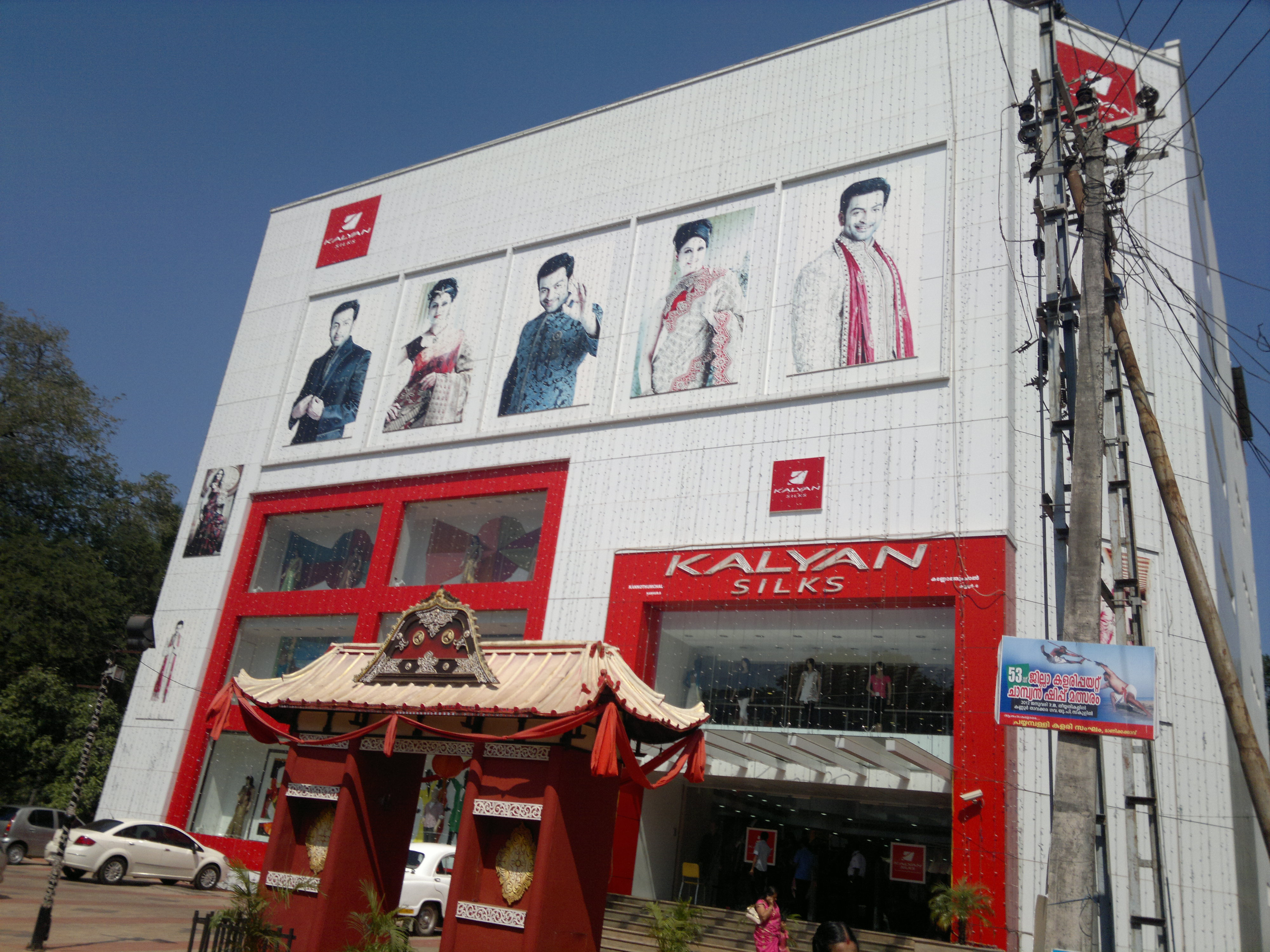
- Company type: Private
- Industry: Textiles
- Founder: T. S. Kalyanaraman
- Headquarters: Thrissur, Kerala
- Area served: India; United Arab Emirates; Oman; Qatar
- Key people: T. S. Pattabhiraman
- Products: Textiles
- Owner: Kalyan Group
- Website: www.kalyansilks.com

Kalyan Silks is an Indian textile retailer founded by T. S. Kalyanaraman. At present, the ownership of the company rests with T. S. Pattabhiraman. It is a subsidiary of the Kalyan Group holding company. It was started in the city of Thrissur, Kerala.

There are branches throughout Kerala in districts such as Ernakulam, Palakkad, Calicut, Kannur, Kottayam, Pathanamthitta, Trivandrum, Thodupuzha, Kasargod, and Malappuram. They have established branches in other Indian states including Tamil Nadu, Karnataka, and Telangana. There are also branches in the United Arab Emirates and Oman.
