= Poonkunnam Siva Temple =

Hindu temple in Kerala, India

Punkunnam Siva Temple
- പുങ്കുന്നം ശിവ ക്ഷേത്രം
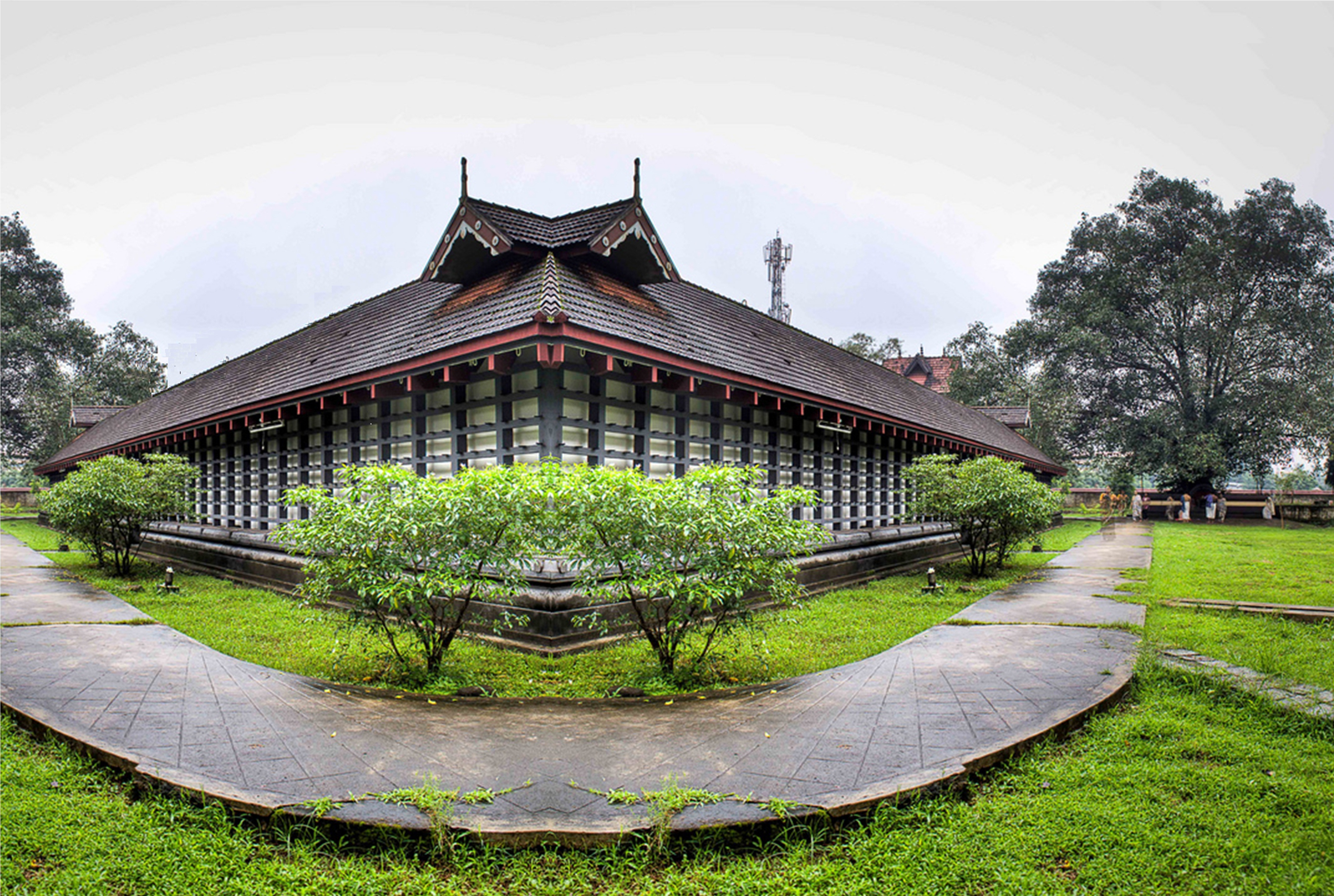
- Main building of Temple

- Siva Temple Punkunnam, Thrissur, Kerala

Religion
- Affiliation: Hinduism
- District: Thrissur
- Deity: Shiva (പരമശിവന്‍)
- Festival: Maha Shivaratri

Location
- Location: Punkunnam, Thrissur
- State: Kerala
- Country: India
- Interactive map of Punkunnam Siva Temple
- Coordinates: 10.534539°N 76.202795°E

Architecture
- Type: Kerala

Specifications
- Temple: One
- Elevation: 36.4 m (119 ft)

Punkunnam Shiva Temple is a small temple dedicated to the Hindu god Shiva, located in Punkunnam, a suburb of Thrissur city in Kerala. There are shrines to Parvati (who is installed in the same sanctum as Shiva), Ganapathi, Ayyappan, Krishna as Parthasarathy and Nāgas (snake deities). It is administered by Cochin Devaswom Board.

== See also ==
- Poonkunnam Seetha Ramaswamy Temple
- Kuttankulangara Sri Krishna Temple
- Temples of Kerala
- Poonkunnam Siva Temple
