= KPN Travels =

Indian private travel company

KPN Travels கே.பீ.என் ட்ராவல்ஸ்
- Founded: 1972; 53 years ago
- Headquarters: Salem, Tamil NaduIndia
- Service area: South India
- Service type: Bus, Cabs
- Routes: 200+
- Fleet: 250
- Chief executive: Dr. K.P. Natarajan
- Website: kpntravels.info

KPN Travels is a private travel company operating long-distance intercity bus services between major towns in the South Indian states of Tamil Nadu, Karnataka, Kerala, Telangana, Andhra Pradesh and Puducherry. KPN Travels is headquartered in Salem, Tamil Nadu and was founded in 1972 by Dr. K. Ponmalai Goundar Natarajan.

The company operates air conditioned and non-AC semi-sleeper services on the majority of routes with sleeper and 2+2 A/C Volvo B7R multi-axle services on select routes. The company faces competition from other private operators, state transport corporations.
