= Punkunnam Seetha Ramaswamy Temple =

- Seetha Ramaswamy Temple, Punkunnam, Thrissur, Kerala

Religion
- Affiliation: Hinduism
- District: Thrissur
- Deity: Rama with Seetha
- Festival: Rama Navami

Location
- Location: Punkunnam
- State: Kerala
- Country: India
- Interactive map of Punkunnam Seetha Ramaswamy Temple
- Coordinates: 10.538525°N 76.201521°E

Architecture
- Type: Architecture of Kerala
- Completed: 1899

Specifications
- Temple: One
- Elevation: 27.14 m (89 ft)

Punkunnam Seetha Ramaswamy Temple more commonly called as 'Pushpagiri Seeta Ramaswamy temple' is located in the Pushpagiri agraharam of Punkunnam, Thrissur city of Kerala, India.

The temple is one of the unique temples dedicated to Lord Rama where both Rama and Seeta share the same pedestal in the sanctum sanctorum. The other temple that comes to mind here is the Bhadrachala Rama temple. However there Seeta is seen sitting on Rama's lap. Here the vigraha of Rama and Seeta are different but placed on the same pedestal. The garbhagriha is visible from the dhvajastambha itself. However, when viewing from the dhvajastamba, only Rama can be seen, the vigraha of Seeta placed inwards towards Rama's left. The temple also houses sannidhis for Lakshmana (called Ilaya Perumal) and Hanuman. The Hanuman statue here is of 55 ft tall including the pedestal. This Hanuman statue was unveiled by the Prime Minister of India on 25 April 2023.

In the temple complex, we also find separate temples for Ayyappan and Lord Shiva. In fact, the Shiva temple and the temple pond in front of it are much ancient than the Rama temple itself.

Diwan Bahadur T. R. Ramachandra Iyer, a justice in the Cochin Court, constructed this temple for his Ishta devata and the Kumbhabhishekam was held on 13 June 1895. Even till date, the members belonging to this family are entrusted the responsibility of conducting the Seeta-Kalyana Utsavam during the Rama Navami celebrations.

To this place belong notable people such as the Kalyan Group business family, well known carnatic musicians Vidwans Srikrishna Mohan and Ramkumar Mohan popularly called Trichur Brothers, their father Mridangam Vidwan Shri Trichur R Mohan and many others.

== See also ==
- Punkunnam Siva Temple
- Kuttankulangara Sri Krishna Temple
