= Kuttankulangara Sri Krishna Temple =

Coordinates: 10.53729°N 76.20700°E

- (കുട്ടന്‍കുളങ്ങര അമ്പലം)
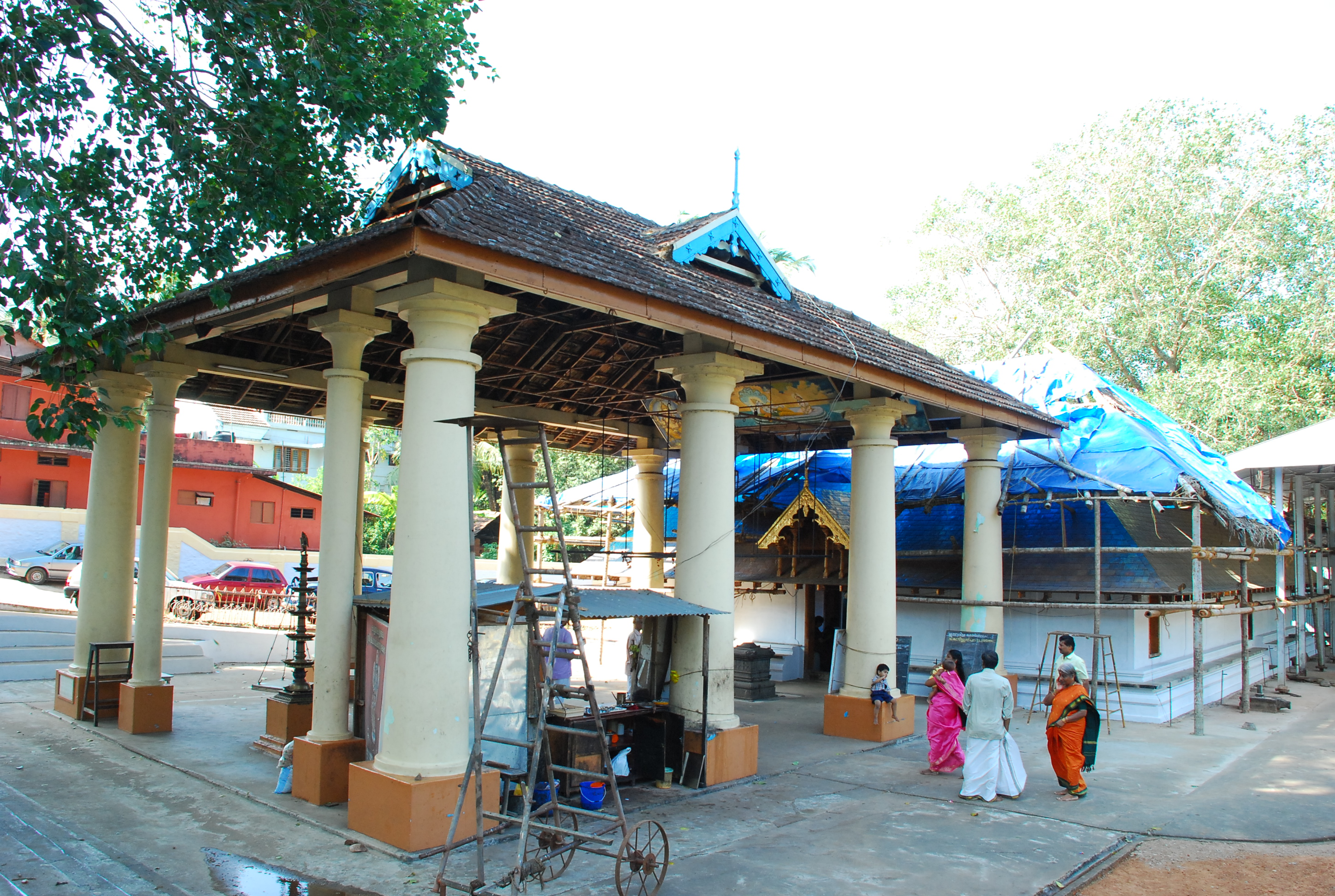

Religion
- Affiliation: Hinduism
- Deity: Sri Krishna (സന്താനഗോപാല മൂര്‍ത്തി), a deity which prospers human life with baby (സന്താനം)
- Festivals: The Utsavam (ഉത്സവം) is celebrated during January–February (മകര മാസം). There is a ritual called Pannivetta (പന്നി വേട്ട). A model pig is made and a hunter shoots it down at the base of the banyan tree (ആല്‍ത്തറ).

Location
- Location: Kuttankulangara
- State: Kerala
- Country: India
- Interactive map of Kuttankulangara Sri Krishna Temple

Architecture
- Type: Kerala
- Monuments: The other deities in the temple are Ganesha (ഗണപതി), Devi (ദേവി), and Serpent God.(നാഗരാജാവ്)

Kuttankulangara Sri Krishna Temple is located in Punkunnam, Thrissur district of Kerala, south India and is considered to be over 300 years old. It is located in the Kuttankulangara ward of Thrissur Municipal Corporation. It is 500 meters away from Punkunnam Railway station. A ritual called Vishnu is practiced there where arrangements of offerings are given to the Lord Krisha. It is believed to blessings for the year ahead.

== See also ==
- Punkunnam Siva Temple
- Poonkunnam Seetha Ramaswamy Temple
