= Manappuram Finance =

Indian financial services company

Manappuram Finance Limited
- Formerly: Manappuram General Finance and Leasing Ltd
- Type: Public
- Traded as: BSE: 531213; NSE: MANAPPURAM
- Industry: Non-banking financial company
- Founded: 1949; 77 years ago
- Headquarters: Valapad, Thrissur, Kerala, India
- Key people: V. P. Nandakumar (MD & CEO)
- Products: Gold loan; Forex & money transfer; SMS finance; Commercial vehicle loan
- Revenue: ▲₹6,749 crore (US$700 million) (FY23)
- Net income: ▲₹1,495 crore (US$160 million) (FY23)
- Number of employees: 42,000+
- Website: www.manappuram.com

Manappuram Finance Ltd is an Indian non-banking financial company (NBFC) based in Valapad, Thrissur, Kerala.

== History ==
The company was founded in 1949 by late V. C. Padmanabhan in Thrissur district. The company commenced its operations at Valappad, mainly with money lending activity.

The group's flagship company, MAGFIL, was established in 1992 in the wake of economic reforms launched by the Government of India. Its activity was mainly pawn broking and money lending.

Manappuram Finance Ltd. was listed on the Bombay Stock Exchange (BSE) in November 1995 following its initial public offering (IPO).

In 2014, Manappuram Finance acquired Delhi-based Milestone Home Finance Company and subsequently renamed the company as Manappuram Home Finance. In 2015, Manappuram Finance acquired Asirvad Microfinance, a Chennai-based microfinance company.

In March 2025, Bain Capital signed a definitive agreement to acquire an 18.6% stake in Manappuram Finance for ₹4,385 crore (US$460 million). This transaction set off a mandatory open offer by Bain Capital for an additional 26% stake.

== Controversies ==
In February 2012, the Reserve Bank of India (RBI) issued a warning to the general public against keeping deposits with Manappuram Finance. In response, the company announced an immediate compliance to any of RBI's concerns and decided to constitute an independent committee under the chairmanship of Jagdish Capoor (former Deputy Governor of RBI and former chairman of HDFC Bank) to review relevant aspects of operations, systems, controls and organizational structure, including Board composition and effectiveness.
