= Thrissur Ayurveda Cluster =

Indian Ayurvedic company

Thrissur Ayurveda cluster is an Ayurveda cluster situated in KINFRA Park in Koratty in Thrissur District. The cluster is meant for a comprehensive development of Kerala brand of Ayurvedic products and train the manufacturers of Ayurveda products on the importance of safety, quality and efficacy. The cluster have facilities for testing and analysis, process product validation, safety study and manufacture. The cluster is approved by the Department of Ayurveda, Yoga & Naturopathy, Unani, Siddha and Homoeopathy (AYUSH).

== History ==
The Government of India in 2005 approved setting up an Ayurveda cluster in Thrissur District to develop Ayurvedic products so as to compete in the international markets. The cluster is implemented by a consortium of 62 Ayurveda products manufacturers in Kerala known as Confederation for Ayurvedic Renaissance Keralam Ltd (CARe-Keralam), Kerala Industrial Infrastructure Development Corporation (Kinfra) and Kerala Industrial Development Corporation (KSIDC).

== Infrastructure ==
The cluster unit was set up on 5 acres of land at the Kinfra Park and started working in 2010. The cluster includes five buildings, one godown, one museum, one analytical laboratory, one process validation lab, one toxicology lab and one common production centre. The area of the buildings comes around 60,000 square feet. In the second phase of development, the production area will be increased. The Government of India and Department of Ayush, under Ministry of Health has also set up a Rs 20-crore quality testing facility in the cluster for exporters of Ayurveda medicine. The cluster has 53 manufacturing units as members and can be increased. About 20,000 direct job opportunities would be generated in phases.
