= Kottekkad Temple =

Hindu temple in Kerala, India

Kottekkad Temple is a Hindu temple situated about 8 km from Thrissur, Kerala, India. It has "pratishtas" of Bhagavathi, Shiva, Aanganear (Hanuman), Ayyappan, Nagathanmar, Subhramaniyan (Murugan), and Bhrahmarakshassu.

It is notable for an ecumenical feast with Catholics.
