= Valapad =

- village
- Location in Kerala, India Valapad (India)
- Coordinates: 10.398222°N 76.091781°E
- Country: India
- State: Kerala
- District: Thrissur

Government
  - Type: Panchayath
  - Body: Elected Members from 19 local bodies(called "wards")will govern the Panchayath.

Population (2011)
  - Total: 35,237

Languages
  - Official: Malayalam, English
- Time zone: UTC+5:30 (IST)
- PIN: 680567
- Telephone code: 0487
- Vehicle registration: KL 75

Valapad is a village situated in the Thrissur district in the state of Kerala in southern India. It is about 24 km from Thrissur city. It lies by the National Highway 66. The geographical advantage of this village is, in a radius of 25 to 30 kilometers, there are five municipalities and one city corporation. They are Kodungallur, Irinjalakuda, Chavakkad, Guruvayur, Kunnamkulam and Thrissur. Valapad Beach is considered to be a major tourist destination.

== Demographics ==
As of 2011 India census, Valappad had a population of 35237 with 16208 males and 19029 females.

== Trivia ==
The poet Kunjunni Mash was a native of Valapad.
