= Dhanlaxmi Bank =

Private bank in Kerela in India

Dhanlaxmi Bank Limited
- Type: Public
- Traded as: BSE: 532180; NSE: DHANBANK
- Industry: Banking; Financial services
- Founded: 14 November 1927; 98 years ago
- Headquarters: Thrissur, Kerala, India
- Key people: Ajith Kumar K K (CEO & MD)
- Products: Credit cards; Consumer banking; Corporate banking; Finance and Insurance; Mortgage loans; Private banking; Investment banking
- Revenue: ▲₹1,794 crore (US$190 million) (2026)
- Net income: ▲₹102.75 crore (US$11 million) (2026)
- Total assets: ▲₹21,237 crore (US$2.2 billion) ( 2026)
- Number of employees: 1,856 (March 2026)
- Capital ratio: 18.92%
- Website: dhan.bank.in

Dhanlaxmi Bank is an Indian private sector bank headquartered in Thrissur, Kerala. It was incorporated on 14 November 1927 at Thrissur. It became a Scheduled Commercial Bank in the year 1977.

The Bank has 264 branches and 285 ATMs across India.

== History ==
The bank changed its name from Dhanalakshmi Bank to Dhanlaxmi Bank on 10 August 2010.

In 2020, shareholders voted to remove CEO Sunil Gurbaxani at the bank's annual general meeting, owing to governance issues at the bank.

In April 2024, the Reserve Bank of India approved the appointment of Ajith Kumar KK as the managing director and CEO of Dhanlaxmi Bank for three years. Kumar will succeed incumbent CEO & MD J.K. Shivan.

In 2010, shares of Dhanlaxmi Bank reached an all-time high of nearly Rs 200 during strong market momentum in the banking sector.

In December 2024, the board of Dhanlaxmi Bank approved a right issue to raise up to ₹297.54 crore by issuing 14.16 crore equity shares to eligible shareholders to bolster its capital adequacy ratio.

== Operations ==
Dhanlaxmi Bank has deployed a Centralised Banking Solution (CBS) on the Flexcube platform at all its branches for extending anywhere/anytime/anyhow banking to its clientele through multiple delivery channels. The bank has set up a data centre in Bangalore, to keep the networked system operational round the clock. Reserve Bank of India empanelled the Bank as agency Bank for Government agency Business. In 2022, Dhanlaxmi Bank introduced Customs duty collection services through digital services and Goods and Services Tax(GST) collection through online and over the counter methods.

=== Partnerships ===
The bank is a depository participant of NSDL (National Security Depository Limited) offering Demat services through select branches. It has partnered with AGS Infotech for the installation of ATMs. It offers VISA & Rupay-branded debit cards and VISA-branched credit cards to customers. It is also offering insurance services through Bajaj Allianz Life Insurance and CANARA HSBC OBC LIFE company as their Bancassurance life insurance channel partner and Bajaj Allianz General Insurance as General Insurance Channel Partner.

=== Credit cards ===
In March 2010, the bank launched Dhanlaxmi Bank Platinum Credit cards.

== See also ==
- Banking in India
- List of banks in India
- Reserve Bank of India
- Indian Financial System Code
- Kerala Bank
