= KP Namboodiris =

Indian Ayurvedic company

KP Namboodiris is an ayurvedic medicine manufacturing company situated in Thrissur City of Keralam State in India. It also has an interest in personal care and health care products. The company was started in 1925 by its founder K.P. Namboodiri (Kolathappilly Pothayan Namboothiri) in Thrissur. The company has a research & development department.
