= T. S. Kalyanaraman =

Indian businessman (born 1947)

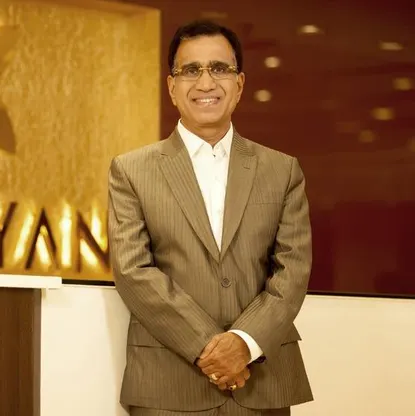
- T S Kalyanaraman
- Born: 23 April 1947 (age 79); Thrissur, Kerala, India
- Education: Sree Kerala Varma College
- Occupation: Business
- Years active: 1993 – present
- Employer(s): Managing Director of Kalyan Jewellers & Kalyan Developers
- Spouse: Ramadevi
- Children: 3

T. S. Kalyanaraman (born 23 April 1947) is an Indian businessman and the managing director of Kalyan Jewellers and Kalyan Developers. Kalyan Group is the holding company of Kalyan Jewellers.

== Early life ==
Kalyanaraman was born in Thrissur, into a Tamil Brahmin family, as the eldest son of T. R. Seetharama Iyer. He was named after his paternal grandfather, who was also the founder of Kalyan Group. He learned the business from his father when he was 12, by helping his father in his shop. Later he joined Sree Kerala Varma College and studied commerce.

== Career ==
He started his first jewellery shop named Kalyan Jewellers in Thrissur City in 1993 with a capital of ₹50,00,000. Later, he expanded the business to 32 showrooms all over South India. In 2024, Forbes magazine's latest annual tally of billionaires has listed Kalyanaraman in 622nd position with a net worth of US$5.4 billion.

As per Forbes list of India's 100 richest tycoons, dated 9 October 2024, T.S. Kalyanaraman is ranked 60th with a net worth of $5.38 billion.

T. S. Kalyanaraman has also released an autobiography called The Golden Touch.

== Personal life ==
He has two sons and a daughter.
