= Kalyan Jewellers =

Indian jewellery chain

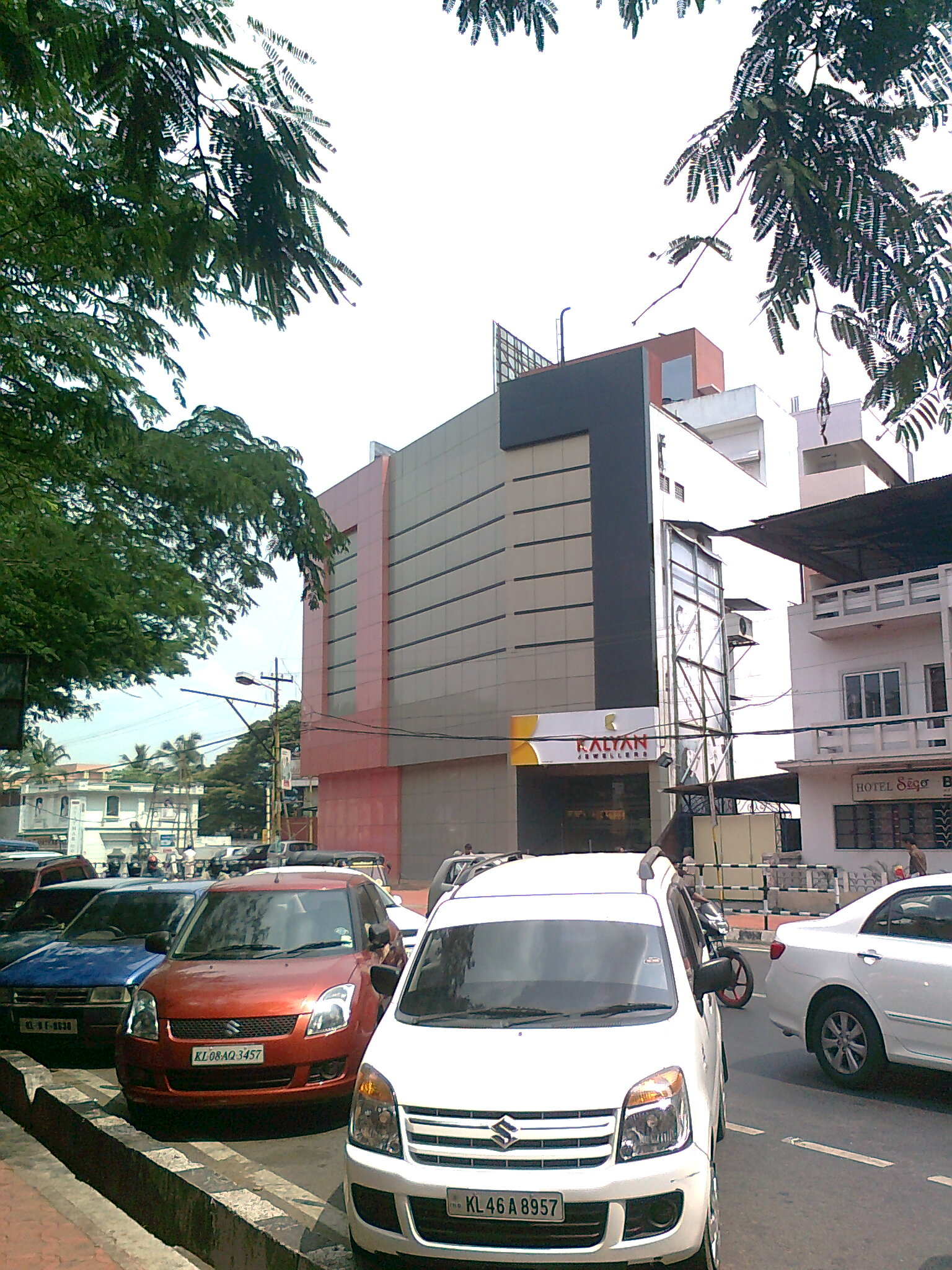
- Kalyan Jewellers showroom in Thrissur, Kerala
- Type: Public
- Traded as: BSE: 543278; NSE: KALYANKJIL
- Industry: Retail; Gems & Jewellery
- Founded: 1993; 33 years ago
- Founder: T. S. Kalyanaraman
- Headquarters: Thrissur, Kerala, India
- Number of locations: 507 showrooms
- Area served: Worldwide
- Key people: T. S. Kalyanaraman (MD)
- Products: Gold, Diamond, Silver, Platinum, Gemstone jewellery
- Number of employees: 12,000+
- Parent: Kalyan Jewellers India Limited
- Subsidiaries: Candere, Kalyan Matrimony
- Website: kalyanjewellers.net

Kalyan Jewellers is an Indian multinational jewellery company, headquartered in Thrissur, Kerala. It was founded in 1993 by T. S. Kalyanaraman. As of April 2026, Kalyan Jewellers operates 507 showrooms across India, Middle East and the US.

== History ==
Kalyan Jewellers was established by T. S. Kalyanaraman, whose family had experience in the textile and retail industries. The first store opened in Thrissur, Kerala in 18th April 1993. Following the initial store, Kalyanaraman's sons, Rajesh Kalyanaraman and Ramesh Kalyanaraman, joined the family business.

Kalyan Jewellers expanded into tier-2 and tier-3 cities in India. It has over 200 stores in India and a presence in the Middle East, with stores in the UAE, Qatar, Oman and Kuwait.

In 2014, Warburg Pincus picked up a minority stake in Kalyan Jewellers for ₹700 crore and a second tranche of ₹500 crore in 2017. In 2021, Kalyan Jewellers went public with an initial public offering (IPO).

In 2022, the company onboarded Vinod Rai as its chairperson and independent non-executive director. Vinod Rai was the former Comptroller and Auditor General of India (CAG) and the former chair of the United Nations Panel of External Auditors.

== Candere ==
In 2017, Kalyan Jewellers acquired a majority stake in Candere, an e-commerce jewellery platform. This acquisition enabled Kalyan Jewellers to establish an online presence. In May 2024, Kalyan Jewellers fully acquired Candere, which now operates as a retail brand offering jewellery through both its website and retail stores.
