= Elephant Boy =

Elephant Boy may refer to:

- Elephant Boy (film), a 1937 film based on Rudyard Kipling's "Toomai of the Elephants"
- Elephant Boy (TV series), a 1973 TV series based on "Toomai of the Elephants"
- "Elephant Boy", the nickname of Fred Schreiber, of The Howard Stern Show's The Wack Pack

== See also ==
- Mahout
