= Wildlife of India =

India is one of the most biodiverse regions and is home to a large variety of wildlife. It is one of the 17 megadiverse countries and includes four of the world's 36 biodiversity hotspots – the Western Ghats, the Himalaya, the Nicobar Islands and the Indo-Burma hotspot.

About 24.6% of the total land area is covered by forests. It has various ecosystems ranging from the high altitude Himalayas, tropical evergreen forests along the Western Ghats, desert in the north-west, coastal plains and mangroves along the peninsular region. India lies within the Indomalayan and palearctic realms, (Note: The higher reaches of the Himalayas in the north form part of the palearctic realm while the rest of the country lies in the Indomalayan realm.) and is home to about 7.6% of mammal, 14.7% of amphibian, 6% of bird, 6.2% of reptilian, and 6.2% of flowering plant species.

Human encroachment, deforestation and poaching are significant challenges that threaten the existence of certain fauna and flora. Government of India established a system of national parks and protected areas in 1935, which have been subsequently expanded to nearly 1022 protected areas by 2023. India has enacted the Wildlife Protection Act of 1972 and special projects such as Project Tiger, Project Elephant and Project Dolphin for protection of critical species.

== Fauna ==
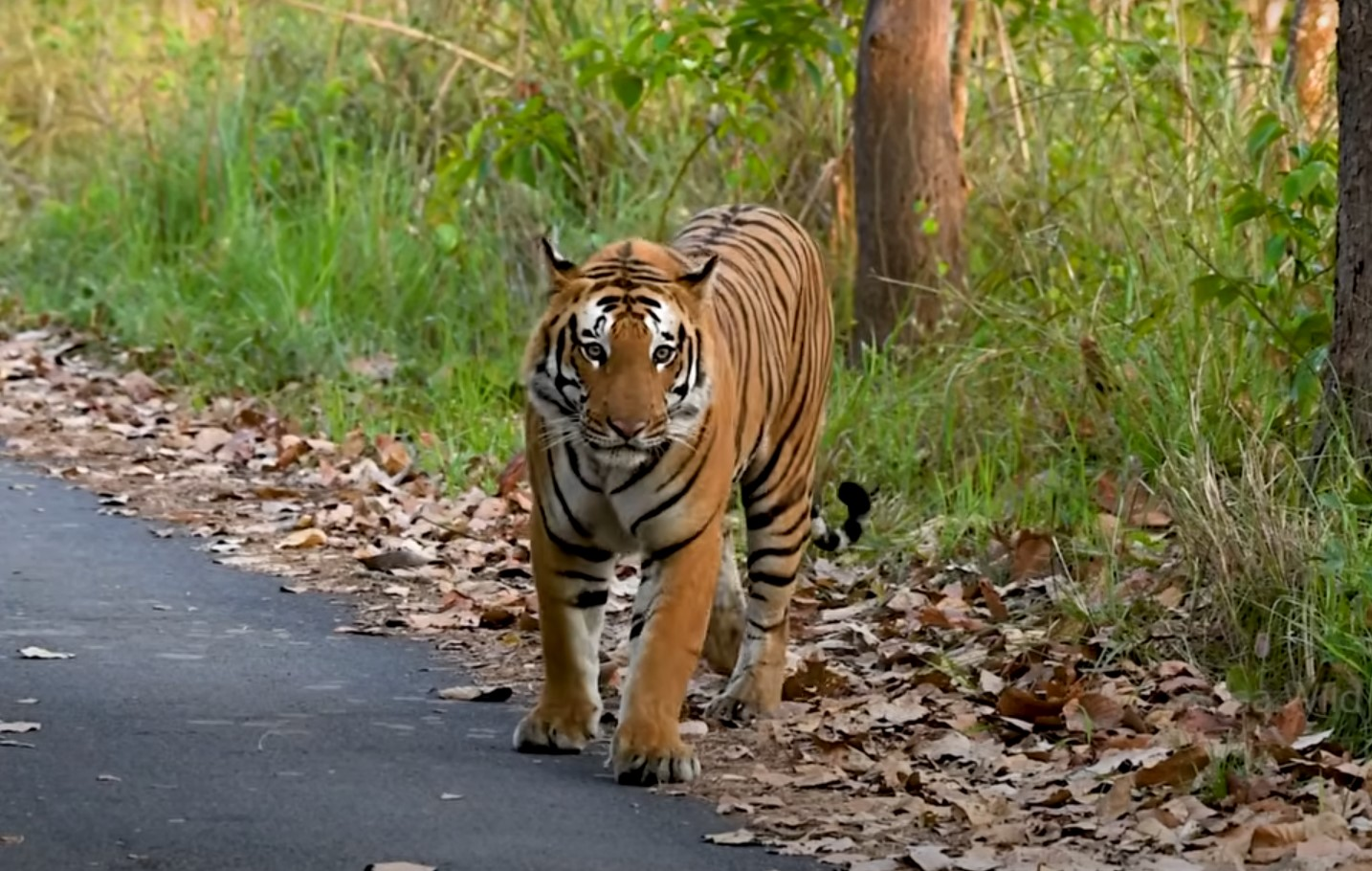
Bengal tiger is the national animal of India

India has an estimated 92,873 species of fauna, roughly about 7.5% of the species available worldwide. Insects form the major category with 63,423 recorded species. India is home to 423 mammals, 1233 birds, 526 reptiles, 342 amphibians, 3022 fish apart from other species which form 7.6% of mammal, 14.7% of amphibian, 6% of bird, 6.2% of reptilian species worldwide. Among Indian species, only 12.6% of mammals and 4.5% of birds are endemic, contrasting with 45.8% of reptiles and 55.8% of amphibians.

The Indian subcontinent was formerly an island landmass (Insular India) that split away from Gondwana around 125 million years ago, during the Early Cretaceous. Late Cretaceous Insular Indian faunas were very similar to those found on Madagascar due to their shared connection until around 90 million years ago. The Cretaceous-Paleogene extinction event around 66 million years ago caused the extinction of many animals native to Insular India, such as its titanosaurian and abelisaurid dinosaurs. During the early Cenozoic era, around 55-50 million years ago, the Indian subcontinent collided with Laurasia, allowing animals from Asia to migrate into the Indian subcontinent. Some elements of India's modern fauna, such as the frog family Nasikabatrachidae and the caecillian family Chikilidae, are suggested to have been present in India prior to its collision with Asia.

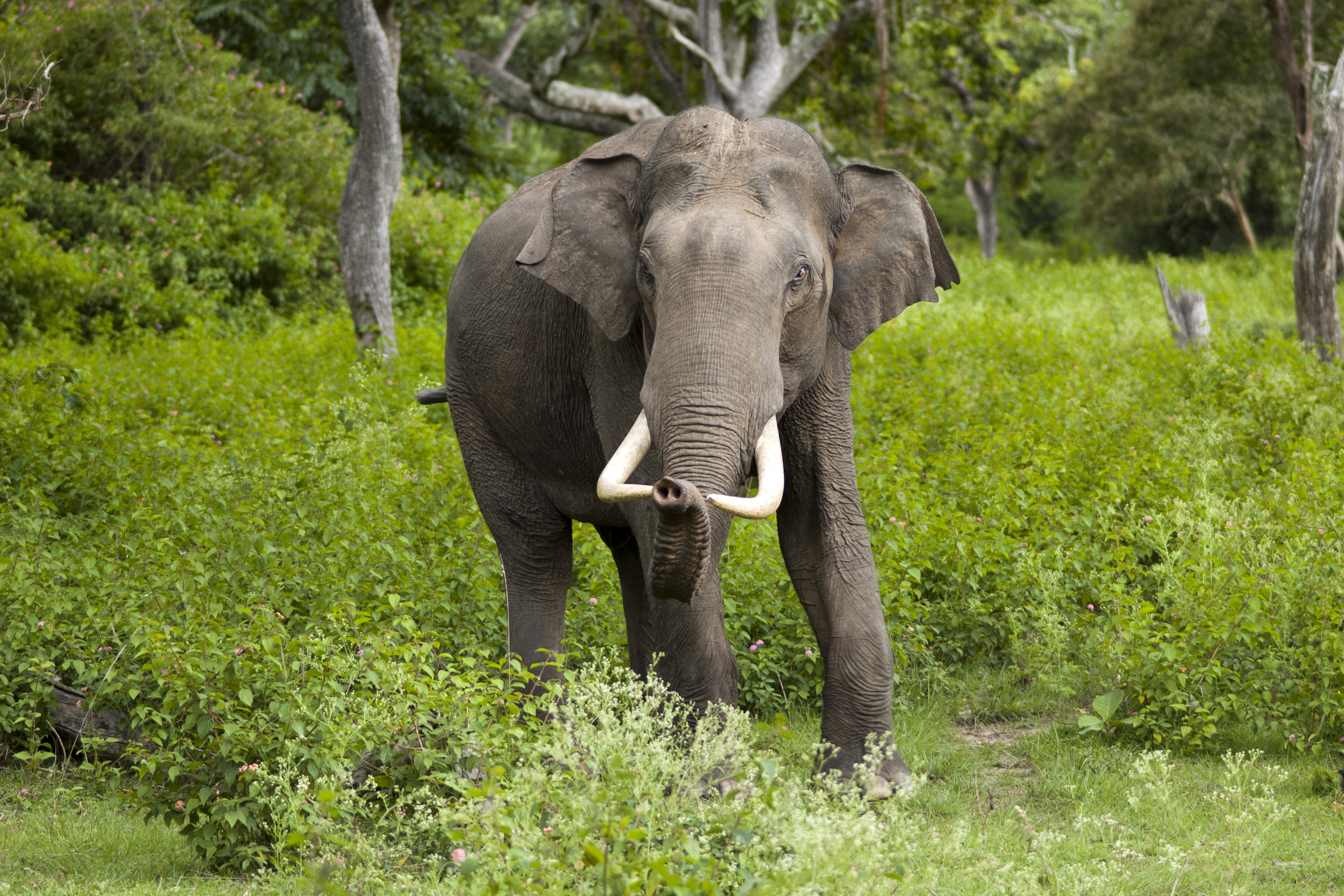
Indian elephant, the largest terrestrial animal species in India

Four species of megafauna (large animals) native to India became extinct during the Late Pleistocene around 10,000-50,000 years ago as part of a global wave of megafauna extinctions, these include the very large elephant Palaeoloxodon namadicus (possibly the largest land mammal to have ever lived), the elephant relative Stegodon, the hippopotamus Hexaprotodon, and the equine Equus namadicus. These extinctions are thought to have been after the arrival of modern humans on the Indian subcontinent. Ostriches were also formerly native to India, but also became extinct during the Late Pleistocene.

India is home to several well-known large animals, including the Indian elephant, Indian rhinoceros, and Gaur. India is the only country where the big cats tiger and lion exist in the wild. Members of the cat family include Bengal tiger, Asiatic lion, Indian leopard, snow leopard, and clouded leopard. Representative and endemic species include blackbuck, nilgai, bharal, barasingha, Nilgiri tahr, and Nilgiri langur.

There are about 31 species of aquatic mammals including dolphins, whales, porpoises, and dugong. Reptiles include the gharial, the only living members of Gavialis and saltwater crocodiles. Birds include peafowl, pheasants, geese, ducks, mynas, parakeets, pigeons, cranes, hornbills, and sunbirds. Endemic bird species include great Indian hornbill, great Indian bustard, nicobar pigeon, ruddy shelduck, Himalayan monal, and Himalayan quail.

The Asiatic cheetah, Javan rhinoceros, northern brown wolf, Himalayan quail, and pink-headed duck went extinct in India in modern times due to human activities.

== Flora ==
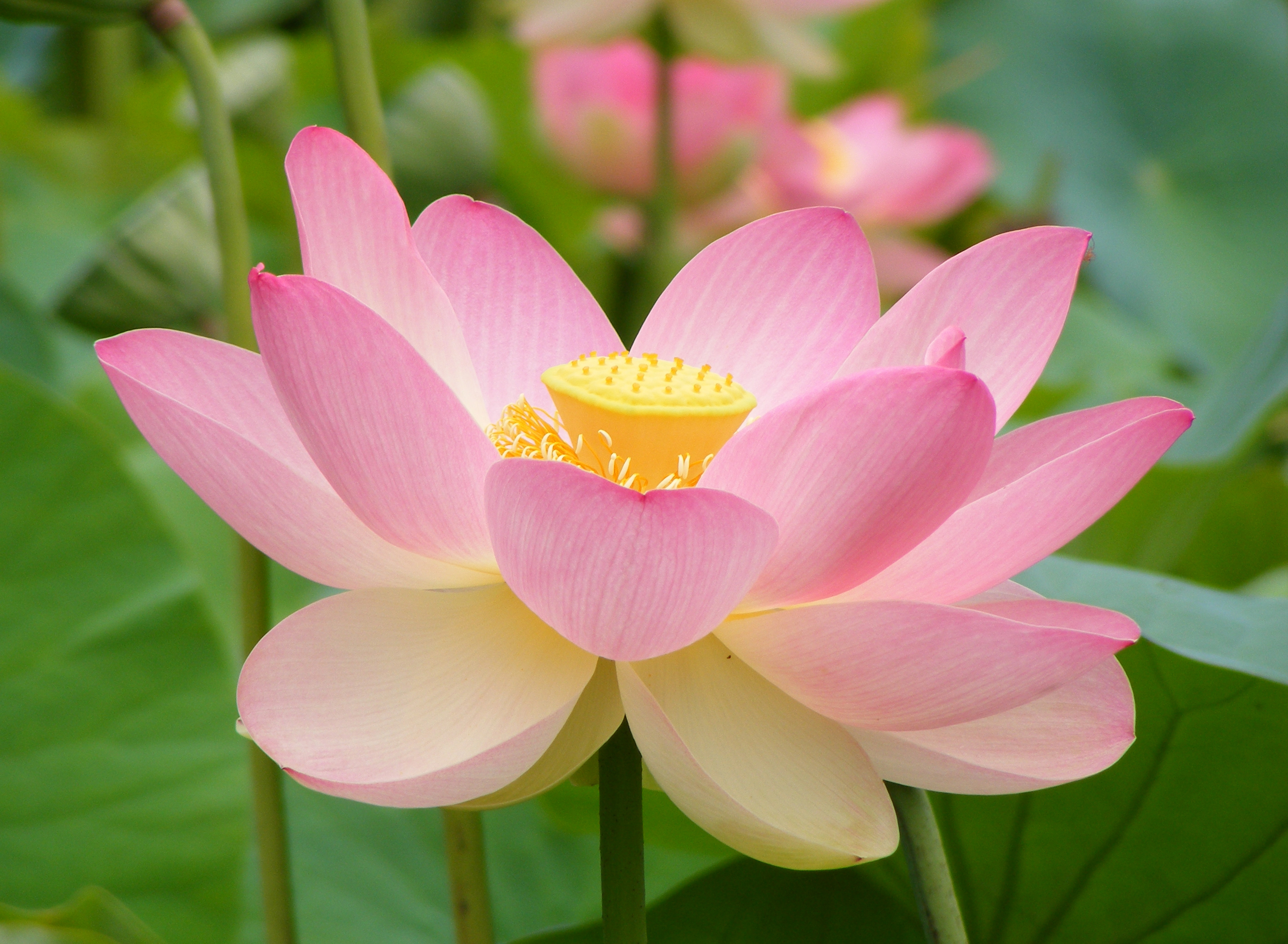
Lotus, the national flower of India

About 24.6% of the total land area is covered by forests. It has various ecoregions ranging from the high altitude Himalayas, tropical evergreen forests along the Western Ghats, desert in the north-west, coastal plains and mangroves along the peninsular region. India's climate has become progressively drier since the late Miocene, reducing forest cover in northern India in favour of grassland.

There are about 29,015 species of plants including 17,926 species of flowering plants. This is about 9.1% of the total plant species identified worldwide and 6,842 species are endemic to India. Other plant species include 7,244 algae, 2,504 bryophytes, 1,267 pteridophytes and 74 gymnosperms. One-third of the fungal diversity of the world exists in India with over 27,000 recorded species, making it the largest biotic community after insects.

== Conservation ==
India harbors 172 (2.9%) IUCN-designated threatened species. These include 39 species of mammals, 72 species of birds, 17 species of reptiles, three species of amphibians, two species of fish, and a number of insects including butterflies, moths, and beetles.

Human encroachment, deforestation and poaching are significant challenges that threaten the existence of certain fauna and flora. Government of India established a system of national parks and protected areas in 1935, which have been subsequently expanded to nearly 1022 protected areas by 2023. Various laws have been enacted such as Indian Forest Act, 1927 and Wildlife Protection Act of 1972 and special projects such as Project Tiger, Project Elephant and Project Dolphin have been initiated for the protection of forests, wildlife and critical species.

As of 2023, there are 1022 protected areas including 106 national parks, 573 wildlife sanctuaries, 220 conservation reserves and 123 community reserves. In addition, there are 55 tiger reserves, 18 biosphere reserves and 32 elephant reserves.

== National symbols ==
National symbols of India
Symbol	Name	Scientific name	Image	Reference
Animal	Tiger	Panthera tigris		
Bird	Indian peafowl	Pavo cristatus		
Flower	Lotus	Nelumbo nucifera		
Tree	Banyan	Ficus benghalensis		
Fruit	Mango	Mangifera indica		
Aquatic animal	Ganges river dolphin	Platanista gangetica		
Heritage animal	Indian elephant	Elephas maximus		
Reptile	King cobra	Ophiophagus hannah		

== See also ==
- List of birds of India
- List of mammals of India
- List of reptiles of South Asia
- Wildlife population of India
