= List of Indian states by wildlife population =

Project tiger

India is one of the most biodiverse regions and is home to a large variety of wildlife. It is one of the 17 megadiverse countries and includes four of the world's 36 biodiversity hotspots. India has an estimated 92,873 species of fauna, roughly about 7.5% of the species living worldwide. The country is home to about 7.6% of mammal, 14.7% of amphibian, 6% of bird, and 6.2% of reptilian species.

The Bengal tiger and the Indian elephant are endangered species which are protected by Project Tiger and Project Elephant programmes run by Ministry of Environment and Forests of the Government of India. India is home to 75% of the world's wild tiger population, and 60% of the Asian elephant population. The Asiatic lion is an endangered species found only in the Gir forest in India. Indian leopards are classified as vulnerable species and protected species, and the Indian wolf is an endangered subspecies of grey wolf, both of which are protected by law.

== State-wise data ==
The South Indian states of Andhra Pradesh, Karnataka, Kerala, and Tamil Nadu are home to nearly 44% of the elephant, 35% of the tiger, and 31% of the leopard population in India, with Karnataka alone accounting for 22% of the elephants, 18% of the tigers and 14% of the leopards in India. Gujarat is the only state with wild Asiatic lion population in the world.

Wildlife population by state
State	Tiger (2022)	Elephant (2025)	Leopard (2022)	Lion (2025)	Indian wolf (2022)
Andaman and Nicobar	0	25	0	0	0
Andhra Pradesh	62	120	569	0	165
Arunachal Pradesh	29	617	42	0	0
Assam	182	4,159	74	0	0
Bihar	31	13	86	0	33
Chhattisgarh	19	451	722	0	320
Goa	2	0	77	0	0
Gujarat	0	0	na (Note: Estimates are not available)	891	494
Haryana	0	0	na	0	sp (Note: Sporadic sightings of Indian wolf has been recorded in Haryana, Tamil Nadu, Uttarakhand, and West Bengal)
Himachal Pradesh	0	0	na	0	0
Jharkhand	5	217	51	0	82
Karnataka	524	6,013	1,879	0	72
Kerala	183	2,785	570	0	0
Madhya Pradesh	785	97	3,907	0	772
Maharashtra	444	63	1,985	0	396
Manipur	0	9	na	0	0
Meghalaya	0	677	na	0	0
Mizoram	0	16	na	0	0
Nagaland	0	252	na	0	0
Odisha	20	912	568	0	84
Rajasthan	88	0	721	0	532
Tamil Nadu	306	3,136	1,070	0	sp
Telangana	21	57	297	0	156
Tripura	0	153	na	0	0
Uttar Pradesh	205	257	371	0	61
Uttarakhand	560	1,792	652	0	sp
West Bengal	131	707	233	0	sp
Total	3,682	22,446	13,874	891	3,191

== See also ==
- African cheetah translocation to India
- Project Dolphin
- Tiger reserves of India
- Wildlife of India
