= Phandi =

Phandi is an expert on lassoing a wild elephant in Mela shikar. A mahout becomes Phandi after passing a rigorous tests conducted by other phandis. Baro-phandi is equivalent to a master's degree in elephant capturing. Only a few can aspire to become a Baro-phandi. They are men of highest caliber, great courage and well steeped in elephant lore who enjoy iconic status in the folklore of the North-East India.

== See also ==
- Koonki
