= Mela shikar =

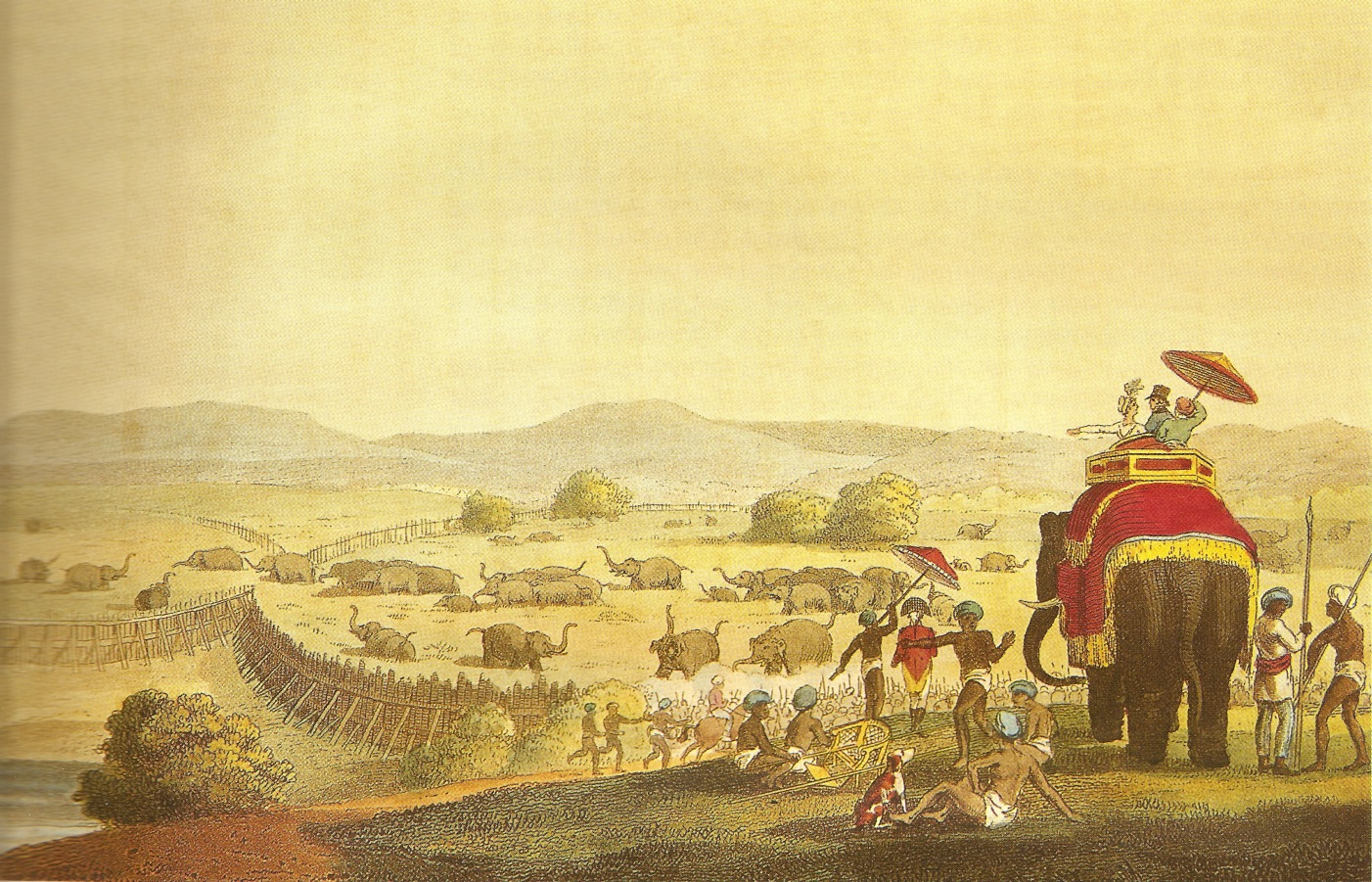
Elephant capturing by the khedda method

Mela shikar (Assamese: মেলা চিকাৰ) is a traditional method of capturing wild elephants for captive use. These methods get employed in Burma, Thailand, Vietnam, Laos and Cambodia and in Assam in India. The process involves lassoing a wild elephant from the back of a trained one, called a koonki. This practice is prevalent in the northeastern part of India, especially in Assam, and is one of the methods seen in ancient India. Other traditional elephant capture methods include: khedda, byle shikar, snaring, pit method, and decoying by using a female koonki to lure a male elephant. Mela shikar used to be organized twice a year – after Durga Puja and during Bihu.

== The method ==
Mela shikar requires the services of a skilled mahout or phandi. This person is able to lasso a wild elephant whilst mounted on another. The phandi, who is well regarded for his abilities, is accompanied by another mahout assistant. Phandis feature in the folklore of northeastern India. Since 1977, this and all other methods of capturing elephants are illegal, but prior to the 1977 legislation, mela shikar was used to lasso an estimated 300 to 400 elephants per year in Assam alone.

Three distinct reasons make the mela shikar method a safe one.

1. It is completely selective. It usually targets carefully studied and selected animals, preferably the younger, more pliable ones.
2. The death rate is low, since comparatively few elephants are caught at one time with sufficient manpower to take care of the captives.
3. Mortality during mahoutship and training is low, because all personnel engaged are highly skilled.

== Gazali shikar ==
Gazali shikar is a variation of mela shikar. Gazali in Assamese means the young shoots of grasses. Elephants are very fond of gazali that sprout up during premonsoon showers in May–June. They are attracted to grassy patches, giving the phandi a good opportunity to capture them.

== Legal issues ==
Before 1977, elephants were under Schedule-II (Part-I) of the Wildlife Protection Act, which granted elephants the status of "special game" for which it could be killed, captured or traded commercially under license. In 1977, the elephant was brought under Schedule-I of the Act, which made its capture illegal. This ban led to the gradual extinction of a line of specially trained mahouts or phandis.

According to S.S. Bisht, the former director of Project Elephant and senior forest service officer, "Under Section 12 of the Forest Protection Act, permission to catch elephants can only be given by the Centre for population control and scientific research. Last time such permission was given to Assam was in the ’80s".

== Effect of the 1977 legislation on phandis ==
The ban has left many of the phandis jobless and homeless. Prohibited from earning a living with their specialized skills, they had to work odd jobs, such as becoming daily wage earners. The government settled 1000 families in 13 villages near the Assam-Arunachal border. In 2006, the residents were evicted, their houses were bulldozed or burnt down, and some residents were physically assaulted. Since that time, the jungle has reclaimed the villages.

== Rehabilitation ==
According to Xodou Axom Hati Phando Xonmilon Union, an organization working for the rehabilitation of the jobless phandis, only 37 phandis are given employment by the government since 1972. According to Jayant Narlikar, Deputy Commissioner of Lakhimpur, around 170 families have been provided money and land in the district.

== Quotations ==
Renowned elephant experts and veteran phandis express their reactions and opinions as follows:

- Expert phandi Parbati Barua says, "If nothing is done now, the art of mela shikar is sure to die soon because there won’t be any expert phandi around to teach his art to the new generation. I do not know whether it will be allowed once again. But I do not see any harm if mela shikar is occasionally allowed. That will provide livelihood to hundreds of phandis and keep the man-elephant conflict in control".
- Renowned elephant expert Dhritikanta Lahiri Choudhury says, " The Project Elephant Committee already has a resolution on mela shikar. That is, the technique of mela shikar can be used, but only to scare away wild herds. For reducing the number of elephants, however, tranquilization is a much better and effective option. Mela shikar is a very old technique. We find the oldest instance of this art in the records of Alexander the Great’s campaigns in the Orient. At that time, even he had captured elephants. It was then considered sport. There’s a belief mela shikar harms elephants. That’s not true."
- Principal chief conservator of forest (wildlife) Suresh Chand says, "From the point of social responsibility, rehabilitation of phandis has to be done. But it’s a very complex issue. We understand the problems of the phandis, but cannot decide on anything."
- Veterinarian and elephant expert Kushal K Sarma says, "Why is the issue of rehabilitation coming up? Trapping wild elephants can never be justified. Besides, elephant trapping is a seasonal affair, so how did phandis survive the rest of the year? They used to cultivate land. So, the question of rehabilitation doesn’t arise at all."

== Revival of the shikar ==
In 2009, Assam has sought permission from the Centre to revive the mela shikar. The state wants to put the captured and tamed animals on government duty - to carry guards and tourists in wildlife sanctuaries and to transport EVMs and polling officials to remote areas. It also hopes that the move will contain the human-elephant conflict.

== See also ==
- Kaziranga Elephant Festival
