= Kaziranga Elephant Festival =

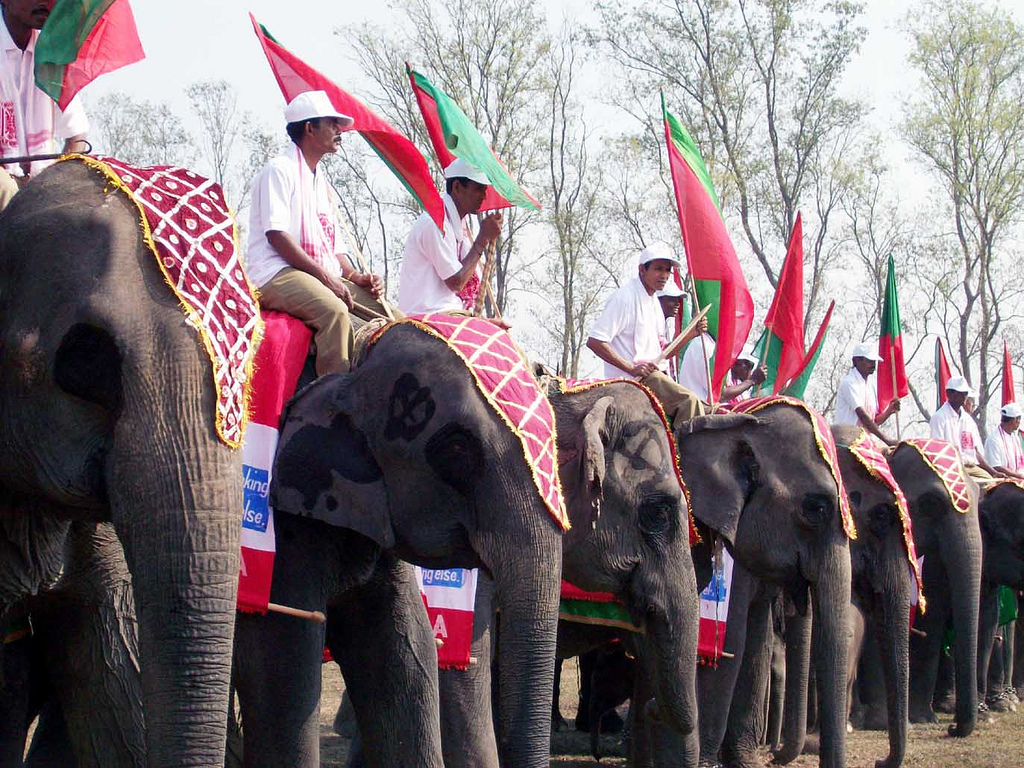
- Elephants participating in the rally at the 7th Kaziranga Elephant Festival 2009
- Date: February
- Frequency: annual
- Locations: Kaziranga; Assam
- Inaugurated: 2002

The Kaziranga Elephant Festival is a yearly elephant festival held in the Kaziranga National Park of Assam for the conservation and protection of Asiatic elephant. The festival is jointly organised by the Forest Department and Tourism Department of Assam to highlight, and find ways to resolve, the increasing man-elephant conflict. Hundreds of domestic Asiatic elephants, decorated from head to toe, participate in the festival. They take part in a parade, races, football and dance, earning praises from the spectators.

== See also ==
- Mela Shikar
- Kaziranga National Park
