= Project Elephant =

Indian government elephant conservation programme

- Logo of Project Elephant

Elephant conservation overview
- Formed: 1992
- Parent department: Ministry of Environment, Forest and Climate Change, Government of India
- Website: moef.gov.in

Project Elephant is a wildlife conservation movement initiated in India to protect the endangered Indian elephant. The project was initiated in 1992 by the Ministry of Environment, Forest and Climate Change of the Government of India to provide financial and technical support to the states for wildlife management of free-ranging elephant populations. The project aims to ensure the long-term survival and viability of elephant populations in their natural habitats by protecting the animals, their habitats and migration corridors. The project also facilitates research of ecology and management of elephants, creating awareness of conservation among local people, and providing veterinary care for captive elephants.

== History and objectives ==
Project Elephant was initiated in 1992 as a Centrally Sponsored Scheme (CSS) by the Ministry of Environment, Forest and Climate Change of the Government of India. The project was initiated to protect the Indian elephant and its habitats and to establish dedicated elephant reserves for sustaining elephant populations. The project was established to provide financial and technical support to the states with free ranging elephant population for the protection of the animals, their habitats and migration corridors. It was also intended to address human-animal conflict and promote welfare of captive elephants. The project has been implemented in 22 States and union territories of India. The project also undertakes activities aimed at constructing infrastructure and other facilities for conservation like veterinary care, field force training, necessary capture and translocation of wild elephants. With regards to captive elephants, the project aims to ensure the well being of such elephants including providing veterinary care, training of mahouts and supervisory staff.

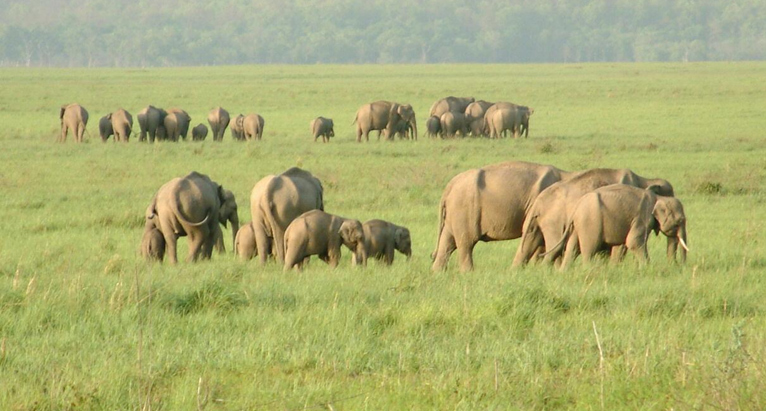
Pictured are elephant herds from Jim Corbett National Park in India

Another important aim of the scheme is to prevent poaching of wild elephants. Project Elephant has been formally implementing MIKE (Monitoring of Illegal Killing of Elephants) programme of CITES since January 2004. It facilitates taking suitable measures like deployment of patrolling squads, intelligence gathering, maintaining data on illegal hunting and to determine factors responsible for poaching and to take appropriate measures to mitigate the same. Project Elephant also facilitates various research activities through the Central Rice Research Institute (CRRI) such as developing crop varieties not favored by elephants, developing elephant-proof storage bins for food grains and developing elephant repellents in order to reduce human-animal conflicts. It has also engaged in research regarding disease-management in captive elephants and efficacy of immuno-contraceptives on domesticated elephants with Assam Agricultural University, monitoring and tracking of elephants with Wildlife Institute of India. Project Elephant also promotes eco-tourism for generating extra revenue for the welfare of captive breeding programmes for elephants, organizes courses for veterinarians and mahouts dealing with domesticated elephants and in promoting awareness on elephant conservation across communities.

== Elephant population ==
The first exclusive exercise for enumeration of wild elephants in the elephant reserves was conducted in 2005. This exercise also sought to experiment with two sampling methods, viz. Block sampling and Line transect-Dung Count. As per the elephant population survey conducted in 2017, the population of wild elephants in the country has increased to 29,964 as compared to 27,669-27,719 in 2007. The estimated wild population in India accounted for nearly three-fourths of the extant population. However, a census conducted on a new DNA-based method estimated the population to have declined to 22,446 individuals in 2025.

There are about 138 identified elephant corridors in India with the majority of the elephant population in India is restricted to four general areas.

Elephant corridors in India
Region	Areas	Corridors	Area (km^{2})	Elephant population (2017)	Percentage of elephant population (2017)
North-East	From the eastern border of Nepal in northern West Bengal through western Assam along the Himalaya foothills as far as the Mishmi Hills, extending into eastern Arunachal Pradesh, the plains of upper Assam, and the foothills of Nagaland, to the Garo Hills of Meghalaya through the Khasi Hills, to parts of the lower Brahmaputra plains and Karbi Plateau; isolated herds occur in Tripura, Mizoram, Manipur, and in the Barak Valley districts of Assam	58	41,000	10,139	33.8%
East	In Odisha, Jharkhand, and in the southern part of West Bengal, with some animals wandering into Chhattisgarh	54	23,500	3,128	10.4%
North	At the foot of the Himalayas in Uttarakhand and Uttar Pradesh, ranging from Katarniaghat Wildlife Sanctuary to the Yamuna River	8	5,500	2,085	7.0%
South	Eight populations are fragmented from each other in northern Karnataka, in the crestline of Karnataka–Western Ghats, in Bhadra–Malnad, in Brahmagiri–Nilgiris–Eastern Ghats, in Nilambur–Silent Valley–Coimbatore, in Anamalai–Parambikulam, in Periyar–Srivilliputhur, and one in Agasthyamalai	46	40,000	14,612	48.8%

== Elephant reserves ==
As of 2023, 33 Elephant Reserves (ERs) extending nearly 80,778 square kilometres (31,189 sq mi) across 14 states have been formally notified.

Elephant reserves in India (2023)
Reserve Name	Range	Estd.	State	Total area (km²)	Population (2005)
Mayurjharna	East-Central	2002	West Bengal	414	96
Singhbhum	East-Central	2001	Jharkhand	13,440	371
Mayurbhanj	East-Central	2001	Orissa	3,214	465
Mahanadi	East-Central	2002	Orissa	1,038	464
Sambalpur	East-Central	2002	Orissa	427	284
Badalkhol-Tamorpingla	East-Central	2011	Chhattisgarh	1,143	NA
Lemru	East-Central	2022	Chhattisgarh	1,995	NA
Kameng	Kameng-Sonitpur	2002	Arunachal Pradesh	1,892	NA
Sonitpur	Kameng-Sonitpur	2003	Assam	1,420	612
Dihing-Patkai	Eastern-South Bank	2003	Assam	937	295
South Arunachal	Eastern-South Bank	2008	Arunachal Pradesh	1,957	129
Kaziranga-Karbi Anglong	Kaziranga-Karbi Anglong-Intanki	2003	Assam	3,270	1,940
Dhansiri-Lungding	Kaziranga-Karbi Anglong-Intanki	2003	Assam	2,740	275
Intanki	Kaziranga-Karbi Anglong-Intanki	2005	Nagaland	202	30
Singphan	Kaziranga-Karbi Anglong-Intanki	2018	Nagaland	24	NA
Chirang-Ripu	North Bengal-Greater Manas	2003	Assam	2,600	658
Eastern Dooars	North Bengal-Greater Manas	2002	West Bengal	978	300-350
Garo Hills	Meghalaya	2001	Meghalaya	3,500	1,047
Mysore	Brahmagiri-Nilgiri-Eastern Ghats	2002	Karnataka	8,056	4,452
Dandeli	Brahmagiri-Nilgiri-Eastern Ghats	2015	Karnataka	2,321	NA
Wayanad	Brahmagiri-Nilgiri-Eastern Ghats	2002	Kerala	1,200	636
Nilgiri	Brahmagiri-Nilgiri-Eastern Ghats	2003	Tamil Nadu	4,663	2,862
Rayala	Brahmagiri-Nilgiri-Eastern Ghats	2003	Andhra Pradesh	766	12
Nilambur	Brahmagiri-Nilgiri-Eastern Ghats	2002	Kerala	1,419	281
Coimbatore	Brahmagiri-Nilgiri-Eastern Ghats	2003	Tamil Nadu	566	329
Anamalai	Anamalai-Nelliampathy-High Range	2003	Tamil Nadu	1,457	179
Anamudi	Anamalai-Nelliampathy-High Range	2002	Kerala	3,728	1,726
Agasthyamalai	Periyar-Agasthyamalai	2022	Tamil Nadu	1,198	NA
Periyar	Periyar-Agasthyamalai	2002	Kerala	3,742	1,100
Srivilliputtur	Periyar-Agasthyamalai	2003	Tamil Nadu	1,249	638
Shivalik	North-Western	2003	Uttarakhand	5,405	1,510
Uttar Pradesh	North-Western	2009	Uttar Pradesh	744	NA
Terai	North-Western	2022	Uttar Pradesh	3,072	NA
Total				80,778	20,391

== See also ==
- List of Indian states by elephant population
- Project Tiger
- Project Dolphin
- Project Cheetah
- Mela shikar
- Khedda
