= Nilambur Elephant Reserve =

Elephant reserve in India

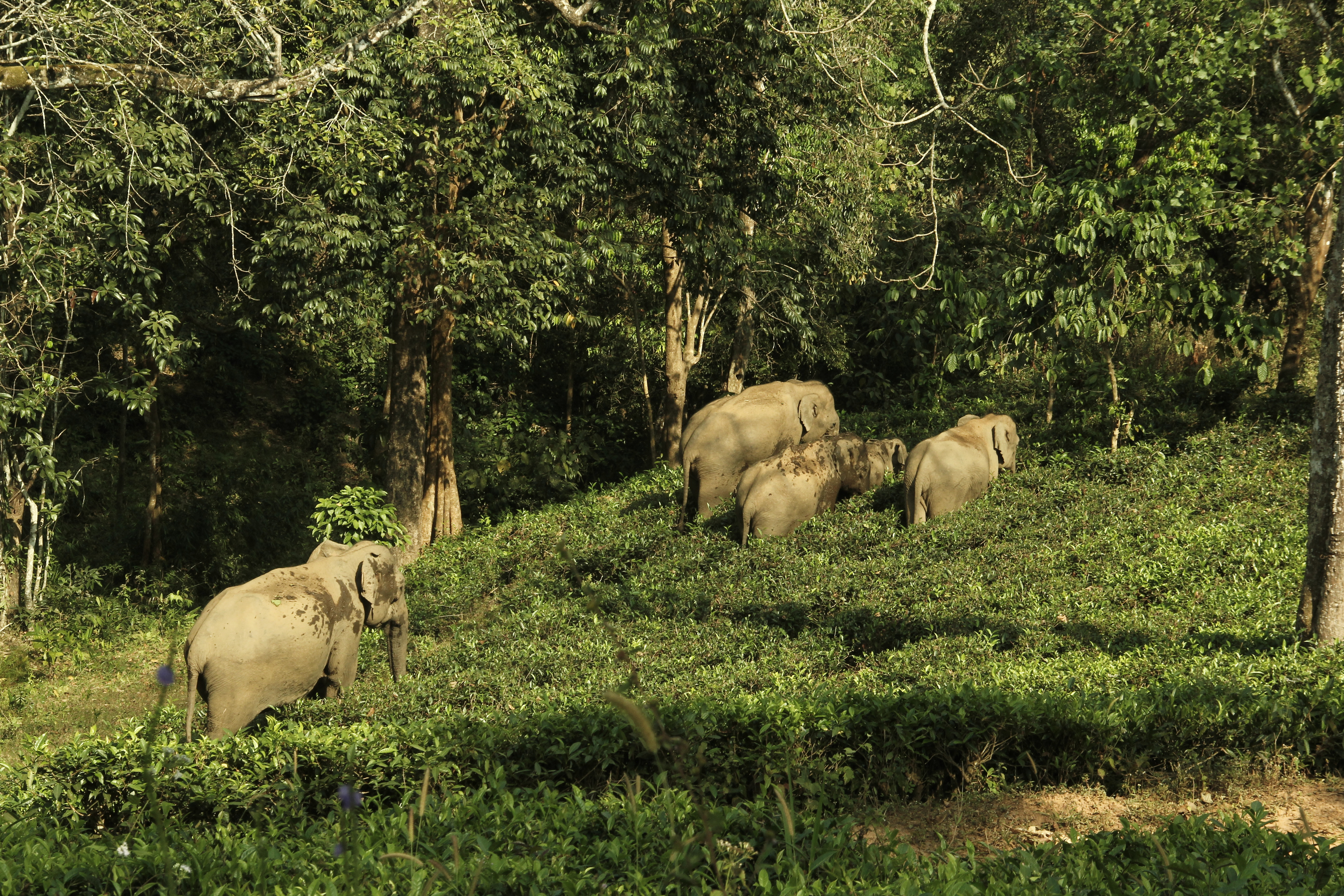
- Elephants in the forest in Nilambur

- Location within Kerala
- Location: Nilambur, Kerala
- Nearest city: Nilambur
- Coordinates: 11°16′N 76°28.5′E
- Area: 1,419 km^{2} (548 sq mi)
- Established: 4 April 2002

Nilambur Elephant Reserve is a wildlife reserve in Kerala, India. It has a total area of 1419 (sq. km^{2}) and was created in 2002 as part of Project Elephant. The reserve is one of four in Kerala; the state having an elephant population of 5706 in 2018.

== History ==
The Nilambur Elephant Reserve was created by the government of Kerala on 2 April 2002 as part of the 'Project Elephant' scheme. It spreads across the districts of Palakkad, Malappuram and Kozhikode and is part of the South Nilgiri Elephant Range - 8. Within the reserve are the Silent Valley and Mukurthi national parks, as well as Nilambur South and North Forest Divisions inclusive.

== Fauna ==
As well as elephants, the South Nilgiri Elephant Range 8 has a diverse fauna including leopards, tigers, leopard cat, gaur, Nilgiri tahr, sloth bear, wild boar, lion-tailed macaque; sambar deer and three other species of deer.

In a 2010 study the elephant population in the Nilambur reserve was observed at being either 205 or 647 depending on the use of the block count or dung count method respectively. In 2011, the reserve had a total density of 0.1745 elephants per km and as of 2017 the density is 0.25 elephants per km.

Elephant population
| | 2005 | 2007 | 2010 | 2017 |
|---|---|---|---|---|
| Block | 281 | 87 | 205 | |
| Line-Transect | 334 | 663 | 647 | |

== Connection ==
Nilambur reserve is connected to several other areas. The Nilambur-Appankapu corridor is 0.4 km long and widthwise, it connects Nilambur with the Vazhikadavu ranges of the North forest division. This corridor sees use by elephants moving between Wayanad South and the forests of Gudalur in Tamil Nadu. It is obstructed by households and a rubber plantation at Appankappu.

Between Nilambur Kovilakom and New Amarambalam is a corridor of 1 km length and 0.4 km width, which reaches into the Silent Valley and Mukurthi national parks in the Nilgiri biosphere. The corridor is dissected by the Gudalur-Nilambur road, presenting an obstacle for elephants.

On the border between Kerala and Tamil Nadu is a 35 km long corridor connecting Nilambur to Bandipur and Mudumalai. Unlike other corridors, its width is 0.1 km. The NH67 road dissects the corridor and numerous agricultural estates and 26 settlements are also situated along it.

The elephant populations in the range of Nilambur, the Silent Valley and Coimbature are connected via the Kallar corridor to populations in the Bhrahmagiri, Nilgiris and Eastern Ghats range.
