= Mayurjharna Elephant Reserve =

- IUCN category IV (habitat/species management area)
- Location within West Bengal Location within India
- Location: Paschim Medinipur district, Jhargram district and Bankura district, West Bengal
- Coordinates: 22.72°N 86.60°E
- Area: 414.06 km^{2} (159.87 sq mi)
- Established: 2002

Mayurjharna Elephant Reserve (henceforth MER) is an elephant reserve in Eastern India. The reserve is located over parts of Paschim Medinipur district, Jhargram district and Bankura district of West Bengal, India. The area of the elephant reserve is 414.06 km^{2} (159.87 sq mi) and adjoining 1,436 km^{2} (554 sq mi) area is also declared as 'Zone of Influence'. The elephant population in MER increased from 47 in 1987 to 118 in 2010. The reserve is declared on 24 October 2002 by the Government of West Bengal.

The area consists of Kankrajhore, Mayurjharna, Banspahari and Bhulabheda Forest Blocks of West Midnapore Division (131.50 km^{2} (50.77 sq mi)) and Popo, Barudi, Quilapal (P) etc. Forest Blocks (88.50 km^{2} (34.17 sq mi)) of Kangsabati Soil Conservation – II, Searbinda, Udalchua, Jalpukuria and Belpahari Forest Blocks (64.56 km^{2} (24.93 sq mi)) of West Midnapore Division and Quilapal (P), Nanna, Dhadka and Quchipara Forest Blocks (38 km^{2} (15 sq mi)) of Kangsabati Soil Conservation Division – II and Ranibundh, Motgoda (P), Chendopathar, etc. Forest Blocks (91.50 km^{2} (35.33 sq mi)) of Bankura (South) Division.
