= Toomai of the Elephants =

1893 short story by Rudyard Kipling

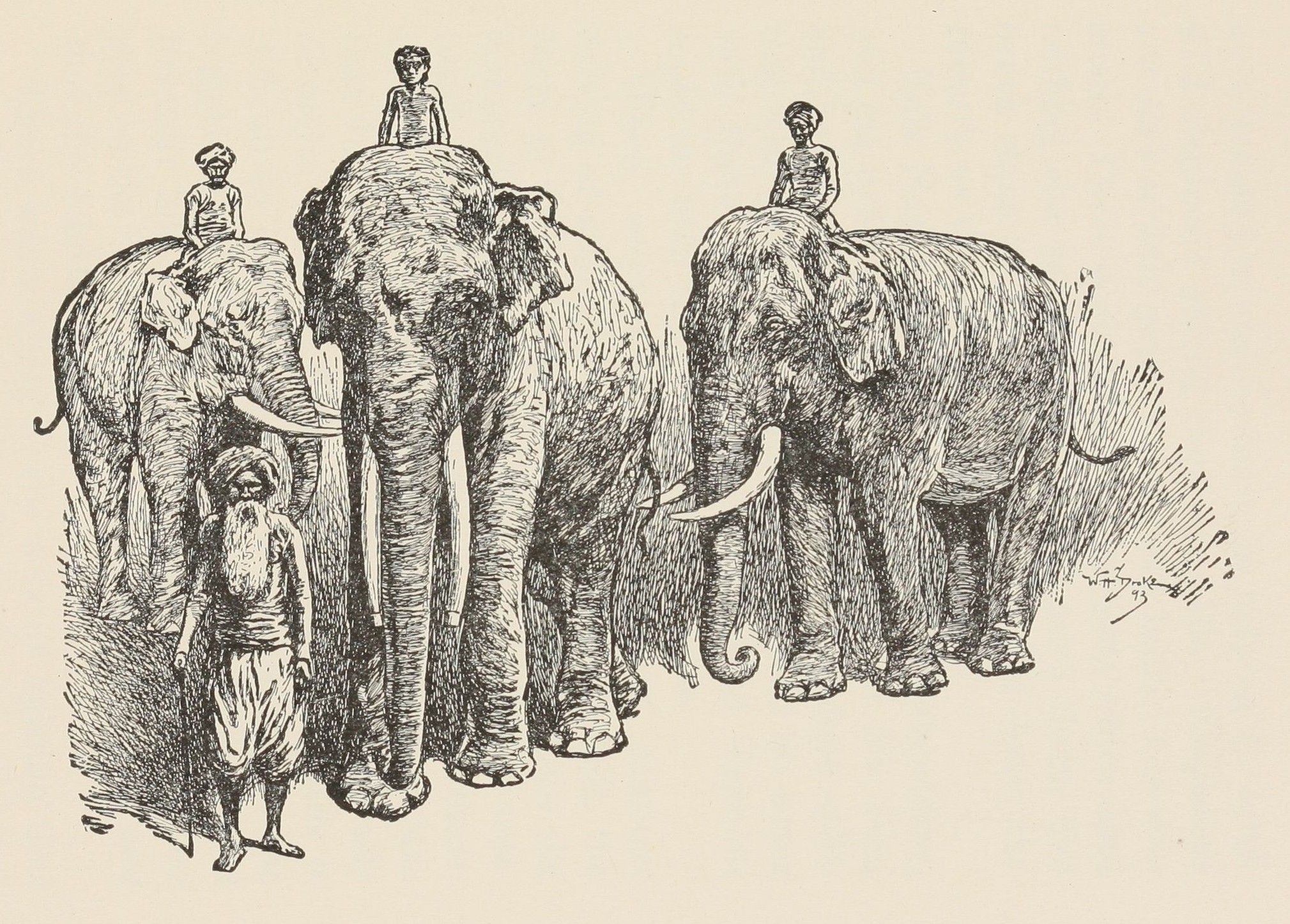
Illustration by John Lockwood Kipling (Rudyard's father)

"Toomai of the Elephants" is a short story by Rudyard Kipling about a young elephant-handler. It was first published in the December 1893 issue of St. Nicholas magazine and reprinted in the collection of Kipling short stories, The Jungle Book (1894). The character Petersen Sahib is thought to be modelled on India-born English naturalist George P. Sanderson (1848–1892).

The story was filmed in 1937 as Elephant Boy directed by Robert Flaherty and Zoltan Korda, starring Sabu. The story was also produced in 1973 as the TV series Elephant Boy starring Esrom Jayasinghe.

== Plot ==
Big Toomai, the boss driver of elephants, takes little pleasure from his work, but his 10-year-old son, Little Toomai, loves the elephants and they understand his kindness. Asking to go on a hunt, his father tells him he can go when he sees the elephants dance, which is something that no man has ever seen an elephant do but later he will.

== Sources ==
- Toomai of the Elephants. London: Macmillan and Co., 1937 ("the photographs illustrating this edition are from the London Film Production Elephant Boy ... most of these photographs were taken in India by Mrs. F. H. Flaherty")
