= George P. Sanderson =

British hunter

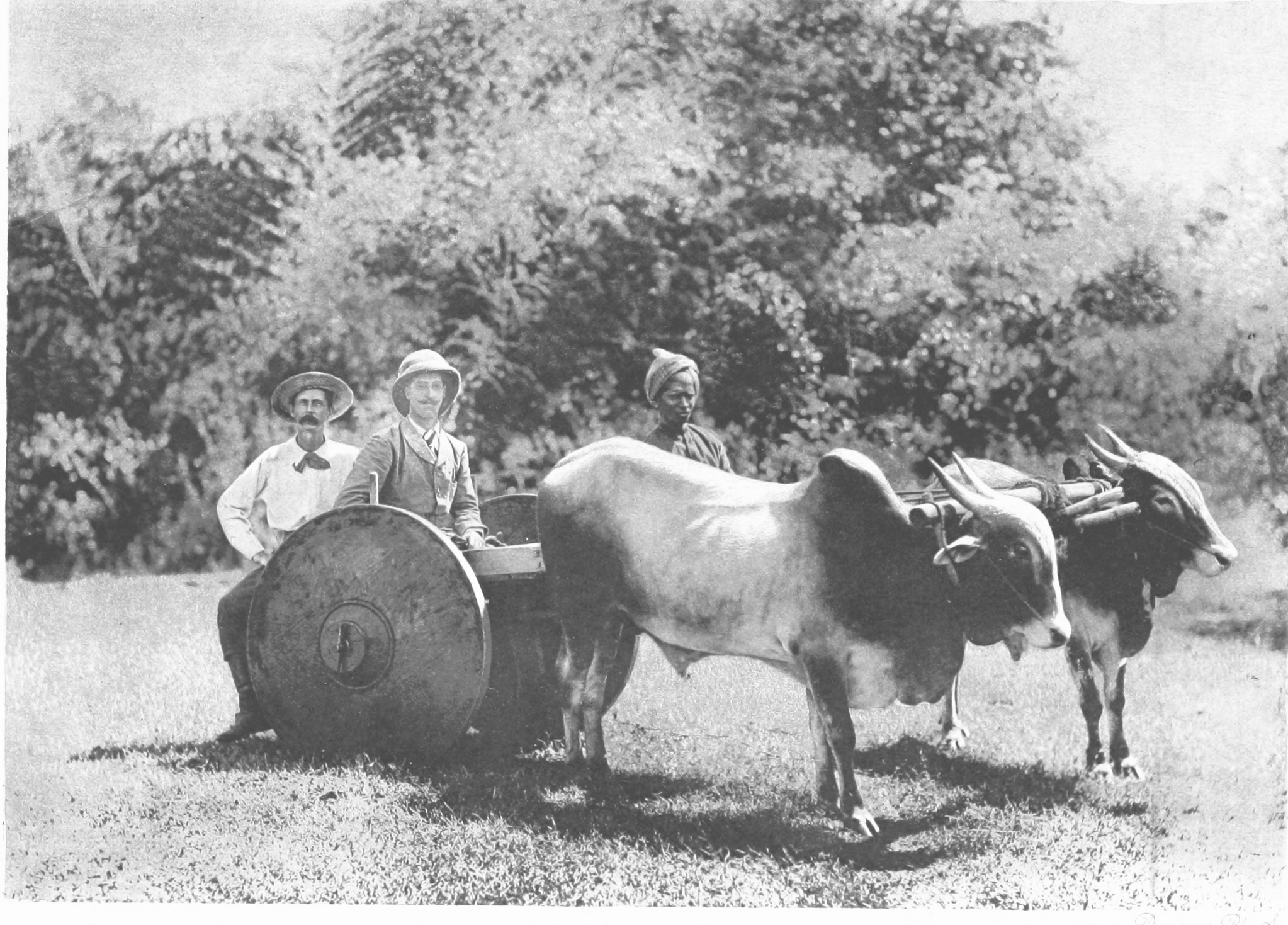
- Sanderson and Prince Albert Victor in Mysore (1890) on a cart drawn by Amrit Mahal bullocks
- Born: 1848; India
- Died: 1892 (Aged 43–44); Chennai, India
- Occupations: British naturalist; Author
- Notable work: Sanderson, G. P. (George P.). (1879). Thirteen years among the wild beasts of India: their haunts and habits from personal observations; with an account of the modes and capturing and taming elephants. 2d ed. London: W. H. Allen.

George Peress Sanderson (1848– 5 May 1892, Madras) was a British naturalist who worked in the public works department in the princely state of Mysore. He began a system to capture wild elephants that were destructive to agriculture and use them in captivity. He was known in the popular press as the "Elephant King" and wrote a book on his life in the forests of India, Thirteen Years Among the Wild Beasts of India: Their Haunts and Habits from Personal Observations of the Modes and Capturing and Taming Elephants. Rudyard Kipling is believed to have modelled the character "Petersen Sahib" in his Toomai of the elephants after him.

== Biography ==
Sanderson was born in India in 1848, the son of Rev. Daniel Sanderson, a Methodist missionary in India from 1842 to 1867. George Sanderson was sent home for schooling to his father's family in Cockermouth, Cumbria. He attended the Wesley (Methodist) Kingswood School, Bath, from 1859 to 1863, returning to India in 1864 at the age of 16. A friend offered him a position working at a coffee estate, but the economic prospects for coffee at the time declined due to blight and borers, so Sanderson needed to find another line of work. He learned Kannada and applied for a government position.

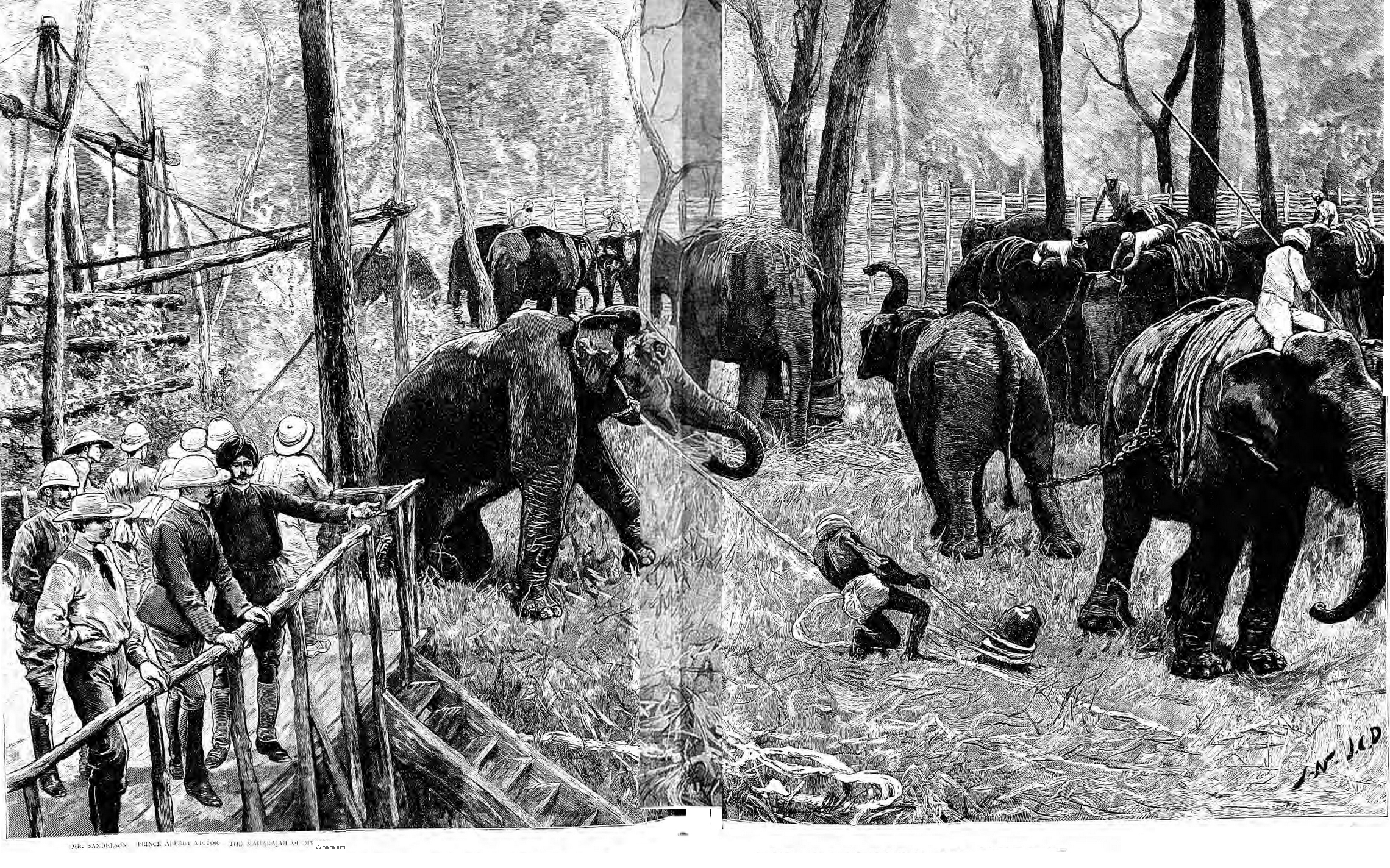
Sanderson with Prince Albert Victor and the Maharaja of Mysore at an elephant capture (1890)

During his employment in the irrigation department of Mysore with the British Government in India, he found time for big game hunting which included tigers, elephants and the Indian Bison. His work involved the maintenance of 150 miles of canals around Hunsur as Assistant Channel Superintendent. Over the years, he became head of the irrigation department and supervised 716 miles of canals that went through the forests. He encountered elephants and tigers during this period. Sanderson observed that some roving herds were destructive and suggested that they be captured. In September 1875, he was put in temporary charge of an elephant catching team of Bengal and worked in the Garo and Chittagong hills. They captured 85 elephants before he returned to Mysore. He introduced a novel way of catching wild elephants for subsequent taming and training in forestry work. Instead of trapping elephants in pits, he tried a method of driving herds into a kheddah, a fenced, ditched enclosure. In some cases, he planted sweet sorghum to attract the elephants. His techniques were successful, and in 1889 he organised a demonstration to entertain Prince Albert, Duke of Clarence & Avondale, when he visited India. The press referred to Sanderson as the elephant (or hathee) king.

Sanderson wrote a book, Thirteen Years Among the Wild Beasts of India, based to a large extent on his life at Morlay in the Biligirirangan Hills. He died of pulmonary phthisis in Chennai at the home of his brother-in-law Dr (later Sir) Arthur M. Branfoot in 1892 shortly after marriage and on the way back for a long leave in England. An obituary noted that he was a vegetarian while another noted his refusal to accept an invitation to dine with Prince Albert Victor who was visiting Mysore.

== Sanderson in Popular Culture ==
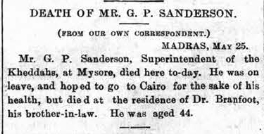
Sanderson's obituary as it appeared in The Bombay Gazette on 26 May 1892.

Sanderson's work likely influenced Rudyard Kipling's character Petersen Sahib, "the man who caught all the elephants for the Government of India." This character appeared in the Jungle Book story Toomai of the Elephants. Both an 1899 newspaper correspondent and the literary scholar Sir Theodore James Tasker, in an article published by the Kipling Society in 1971, connected that reference to George Peress Sanderson.
