= Elephant Boy (TV series) =

1973 Australian-British-German TV series

- Genre: Adventure / drama
- Based on: Toomai of the Elephants by Rudyard Kipling
- Directed by: Bill Bain; Henri Safran; James Gatward; Chris McCullough; Dennis Vance
- Starring: Esrom Jayasinghe; Uwe Friedrichsen; Isobel Black; Alistair Duncan; Jeanie Drynan; Gunnar Möller; Queenie Ashton; John Gregg; Jack Thompson
- Country of origin: Australia / Great Britain / Germany
- Original language: English
- No. of seasons: 1
- No. of episodes: 13

Production
- Production location: Sri Lanka
- Cinematography: Tony Imi
- Running time: 25 minutes
- Production company: Portman Productions / Scottish Television Enterprises

Original release
- Network: Seven Network
- Release: 3 February – 10 December 1973

Elephant Boy is a 1973 Australian-British-German series based on the Rudyard Kipling story Toomai of the Elephants.

== Synopsis ==
The story is about 12 year old boy Toomai, his younger brother Ranjit, and their friendship with an elephant called Kala Nag. The brothers have been orphaned, but share a love of animals, which was instilled in them by their father, who was a mahout. Living in a wildlife sanctuary in the jungle of Sri Lanka, Toumai has to contend with the issues between humans and jungle animals.

== Cast ==
- Esrom Jayasinghe as Toomai
- Uwe Friedrichsen as Karl Bergen
- Isobel Black as Kay Stevens
- Margot Leonard as Mrs Weiner
- Janet Kingsbury as Sue Fraser
- Alistair Duncan as Jaffne
- Jeanie Drynan as Jane Shorter
- Gunnar Möller as Dr Scott
- Queenie Ashton as Doreen Graham
- Jeff Ashby as Tom Mitchell
- John Gregg as Burke
- Jack Thompson as Chuck Ryder
- Brigitte Rau as Dr Fleur
- Peter Ragell as Ranjit
- Siegfried Rauch as Buchmeister
- John McCallum as Jack Wilson
- Peter Reynolds as Strang
- Roy Scammell as Ben Thackray
- Neil Fitzpatrick as Harry Slater
- Norman Yemm as Bob Carey
- Peter Gwynne as Rick Madison
- Cecily Polson as Erika Madison
- Tim Elliott as Bill Clift
- Kevin Miles as Prince Paddam
- Ric Hutton as Colonel Shannon

== Production ==
The series was shot on location in Sri Lanka from December 1971 to April 1972 and consisted of 13 episodes.

== Broadcast ==
The series aired on Channel Seven in Australia in 1973.

== Reception ==
Roger Lancelyn Green of The Kipling Journal wrote of the series: "The title proclaims that Elephant Boy is based on Rudyard Kipling’s Toomai of the Elephants, but the two episodes bore no relation to the original except that the Elephant was called Kala Nag and the Mahout’s son Toomai." He went on to say: "But the film is stolen by Toomai, brilliantly played by a small Cingalese boy called Esrom – and by the splendid filming of animals and native life against a beautiful jungle setting."
