= Elephant Boy (film) =

- Theatrical release poster
- Directed by: Robert Flaherty; Zoltan Korda
- Screenplay by: John Collier; Akos Tolnay (screen play collaboration); Marcia de Silva (screen play collaboration)
- Based on: "Toomai of the Elephants" by Rudyard Kipling
- Produced by: Alexander Korda
- Starring: Sabu; Walter Hudd
- Cinematography: Osmond Borradaile
- Edited by: Charles Crichton
- Music by: John Greenwood
- Production company: London Films
- Distributed by: Anglo-American Film Corporation; United Artists
- Release dates: 5 April 1937 (US); 9 April 1937 (UK)
- Running time: 85 minutes
- Country: United Kingdom
- Language: English
- Box office: $6.24 million (est.)

Elephant Boy is a 1937 British adventure film starring Indian-born actor Sabu in his film debut. Documentary filmmaker Robert Flaherty, who produced some of the Indian footage, and supervising director Zoltan Korda, who completed the film, won the Best Director Award at the Venice Film Festival. The film was made at the London Films studios at Denham, and in Mysore, India, and is based on the story "Toomai of the Elephants" from Rudyard Kipling's The Jungle Book, an 1894 collection of tales set in India.

== Dedication in opening credits ==
"London Film Productions wish to record their gratitude and appreciation for the valuable assistance extended to them in India by His Highness The Maharajah of Mysore and all Government Officials during the making of this picture."

== Plot ==
Toomai (Sabu), a young boy growing up in India, longs to become a hunter. In the meantime, he helps his mahout (elephant driver) father with Kala Nag, a large elephant that has been in their family for four generations.

Petersen (Walter Hudd) hires the father and Kala Nag, among others, for a large annual government roundup of wild elephants to be tamed and put to work. Amused by Toomai and learning that he has no one but his father to look after him, Petersen allows the boy to come too.

Strangely, no elephants have been seen in the region in a while, so Petersen has staked his reputation on a guess that they will be found further north. However, six weeks of hunting prove fruitless. He is ready to give up, but his right-hand man, Machua Appa (Allan Jeayes), persuades him to keep hunting for another month. When the other hired natives learn of Toomai's ambition, they mock him, telling him that he will become a hunter only when he sees the elephants dance (a myth).

One night, Toomai's father spots a tiger prowling near the camp and wakes Petersen. When the two go out to shoot the beast, Toomai's father is killed. Kala Nag's grief becomes so intense, he rampages through the camp, only stopping when Toomai calms him down.

Petersen decides to assign cruel Rham Lahl (Bruce Gordon) to Kala Nag, as Toomai is too young for the job. When Rham Lahl beats the elephant, however, Kala Nag injures his tormenter. The mahout insists that Kala Nag be destroyed, as is the law. Petersen manages to get him to change his mind and accept 100 rupees instead by threatening to have him removed from the safety of the camp.

Unaware of this reprieve, Toomai takes Kala Nag and runs away into the jungle. There, they stumble upon the missing wild elephants, and Toomai sees them dancing. He leads Petersen to them. The other natives are awed, and hail him as "Toomai of the Elephants". Machua Appa offers to train the boy to become a hunter, a plan Petersen approves of.

== Cast ==
- Sabu as Toomai of the elephants
- W.E. Holloway as his father
- Walter Hudd as Petersen
- Allan Jeayes as Machua Appa
- Bruce Gordon as Rham Lahl
- D.J. Williams as Hunter
- Hyde White as Commissioner
- Udham Singh

== Critical reception ==
Reviewing for The New York Times in April 1937, Frank S. Nugent found the film "one of the most likable of the jungle pictures. Having a simple story at its heart, it has had the wisdom and the good taste to tell it simply and without recourse to synthetic sensationalism. Sabu, its 12-year-old hero, never once is chased by a tiger, embraced by a python or dropped into a swirl of crocodiles", and concluded that "Sabu, the Indian boy, is a sunny-faced, manly little youngster, whose naturalness beneath the camera's scrutiny should bring blushes to the faces of the precocious wonder-children of Hollywood. He's a much better actor than the British players Mr. Flaherty tried to disguise behind frizzed beards and Indian names". Other critics were less kind. Writing for The Spectator in 1937, Graham Greene gave the film a poor review, characterizing it as a "faltering and repetitive picture" and noting that the "disappointing diminutive achievement" was caused directly by "enormous advance publicity, [the] director [being] out of touch with the Press for months, [and] rumours". Greene criticized director Flaherty as having released a film with "bad cutting, [] dreadful studio work, [and a] pedestrian adaptation [of] Kipling's story", and specified that Flaherty's biggest "positive crime" in the film was its story construction.

More recently, Time Out thought the film "amiable but dated", and specifically: "Fiction and documentary footage rub shoulders uneasily, but the latter (shot by Flaherty in India) is vividly watchable".

== Box office ==
The film earned UK distributors £54,615 in rentals. This was equivalent to $150,000 gross revenue (Note: See Film industry § Distributor rentals.) ($740,000) and 3,600,000 ticket sales.

In the United States and Canada, the film earned $2 million in rentals. This was equivalent to $5,500,000 gross revenue and 22,000,000 ticket sales.

Worldwide, the film grossed an estimated $6,200,000 in revenue and sold an estimated 26,000,000 tickets in the United Kingdom and North America.

== Bibliography ==
- Korda, Michael (1980). Charmed Lives: The Fabulous World of the Korda Brothers. Allen Lane. pp. 118–20. ISBN 978-0713913187.
