= Kumki (elephant) =

Elephant trained to help with wild elephants

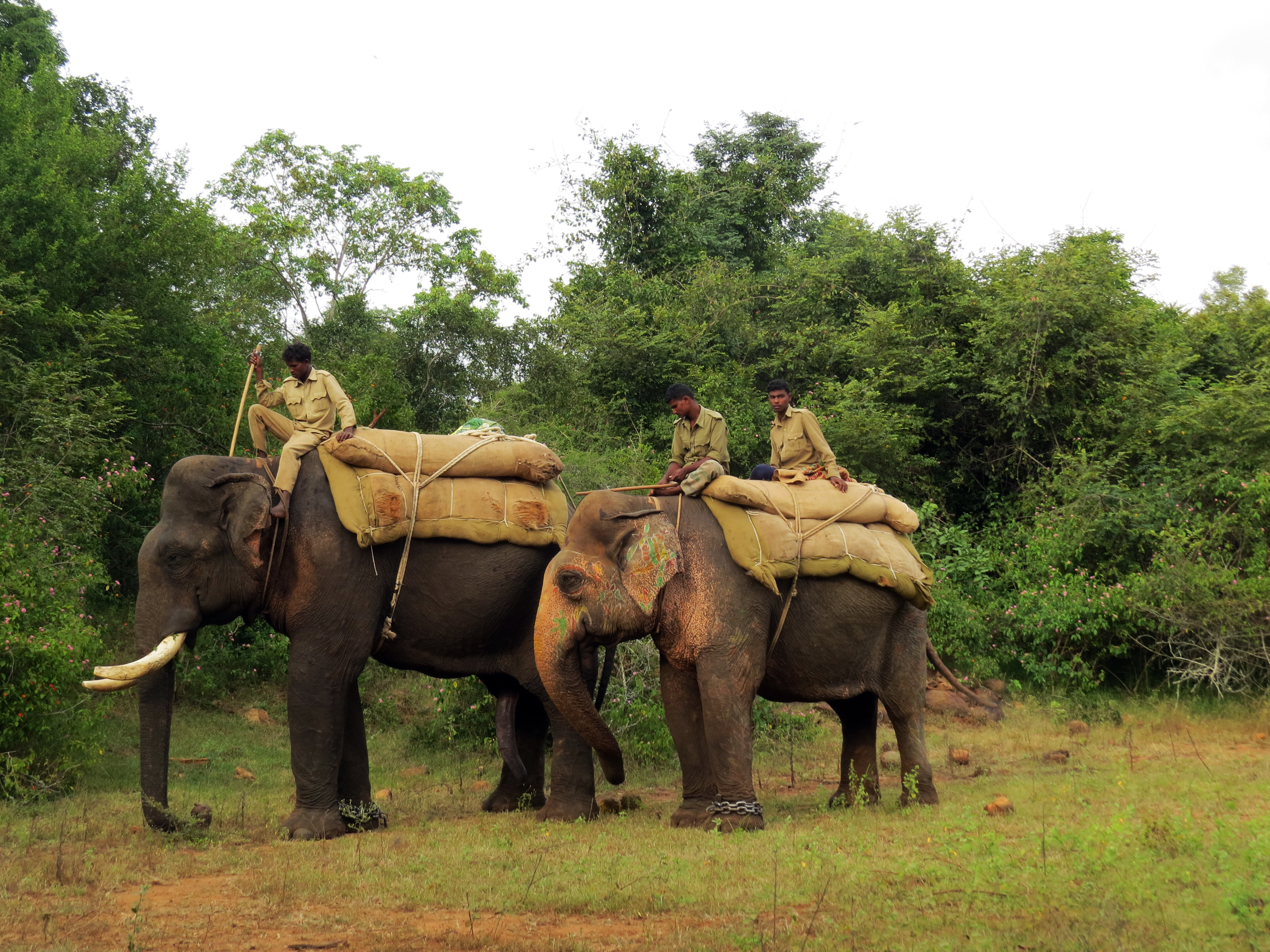
Two kumkis with their mahouts

Kumki (Koomkie, Koonki or Kunki; known as Thāppāna in Malayalam) is a term used in India for trained captive Asian elephants used in operations to trap wild elephants, sometimes to rescue or to provide medical treatment to an injured or trapped wild elephant. Kumkis are used for capturing, calming and herding wild elephants or to lead wild elephants away in conflict situations. In such cases the training process aims at preserving some of the wild dominant character in them, so that they can control wild elephants by force if necessary. When wild elephants enter human settlements and kumkis are used to drive them away, sometimes direct physical contact might not be needed since the territorial behaviour is aided by scent and other communication between animals.

Some Kumki are particularly trained to follow the "foot commands" from their mahouts and to move silently during the entire capturing operation.

== Etymology ==
The word is derived from Persian kumak which means "aid" and is in wide usage from Bengal to Tamil Nadu by mahouts.

== Phandi commands ==
Following are the commands that phandis use to drive an elephant.

- Agad: Go forward
- Pisoo/Pichoo: Go backward.
- Dhutt/Datt: Stop
- Beit: Lie (on belly)
- Tere: Lie (on one side)
- Meile/Mut: Get up

== In popular culture ==
Some movies related to kumki elephants have been released in the Tamil film industry, such as Kumki (2012).
