= Project Dolphin (India) =

Dolphin conservation programme in India (2021-present)

Agency overview
- Formed: 2020; 6 years ago
- Parent department: Wildlife Institute of India, Ministry of Environment, Forest and Climate Change, Government of India

Project Dolphin is a wildlife conservation movement initiated in India to protect the riverine and oceanic dolphins. The project was initiated in 2020 by the Ministry of Environment, Forest and Climate Change of the Government of India.

== History ==
After demands were made by wildlife activists for a project to save dolphins in India, Indian prime minister Narendra Modi announced the launch of Project Dolphin during the 74th independence day celebrations on 15 August 2020. The project launched as an Indian government initiative to conserve both riverine and oceanic dolphin species. The project is under the purview of the Wildlife Institute of India, an autonomous body of the Ministry of Environment, Forest and Climate Change.

== Activities and goals ==
India's dolphins are at risk of extinction due to a variety of factors, namely: stranding in canal systems, constructions of waterways, unchecked fishing activity using nylon nets, noise pollution from ships, amidst other factors. Project Dolphin involves a status monitoring of the species and their potential threats, in order to develop and implement a conservation action plan for protecting dolphins and the aquatic habitat. The project will provide financial support for conservation and anti-poaching activities. The project will also engage with local fishermen and other river/ocean dependent population to help improve the livelihood through other means. It also aims to create employment opportunities and leverage the same for tourism.

As a part of the project, October 5th has been designated as "National Dolphin Day" by the environment ministry. As a part of the project, a dolphin breeding center for the Gangetic river dolphin is planned in the Bengal region in the stretch of the Ganges river between Farakka and Gangasagar.

== See also ==
- Indus river dolphin
- Makara
- Project Cheetah
- Project Elephant
- Project Tiger
- South Asian river dolphin
